= Prom Night (film series) =

Canadian horror film series

- Logo of the original 1980 film
- Created by: Robert Guza Jr. (story)
- Original work: Prom Night (1980)
- Years: 1980–2008

Films and television
- Films: List of films

Prom Night is a Canadian slasher media franchise consisting of five feature films, the first four of which are centered around events at the fictional Hamilton High School. The first film, Prom Night (1980), is a slasher film directed by Paul Lynch and produced by Peter R. Simpson, focusing on teenagers being stalked and murdered by a masked killer at their prom. The film was a box-office success, grossing nearly $15 million. The following sequel, Hello Mary Lou: Prom Night II (1987), was envisioned as a standalone film, but producer Simpson and his company, Simcom, refitted it as a sequel to the original Prom Night. Hello Mary Lou: Prom Night II, a supernatural-themed slasher film, introduced the character of Mary Lou Maloney, a vengeful young woman who died on her prom night in 1957; its only connection to the first film was that both films take place in the same high school.

In 1990, a second sequel featuring Mary Lou Maloney, Prom Night III: The Last Kiss, was released. The fourth film, Prom Night IV: Deliver Us from Evil (1991), featured an entirely new plot, following a group of teenagers tormented by a possessed Catholic priest on their prom night. In 2008, Screen Gems released a reboot mainly based on the original film, also titled Prom Night.

== Films ==
Film	Release date	Director	Screenplay	Producer(s)	Distributor
Original films
Prom Night	July 18, 1980	Paul Lynch	William Gray	Peter R. Simpson	Embassy Pictures
Hello Mary Lou: Prom Night II	October 16, 1987	Bruce Pittman	Ron Oliver	Peter R. Simpson	The Samuel Goldwyn Company
Prom Night III: The Last Kiss	March 13, 1990	Ron Oliver and Peter R. Simpson	Ron Oliver	Peter R. Simpson, Roy Sager	Norstar Releasing
Prom Night IV: Deliver Us from Evil	December 1991 (limited)/May 13, 1992	Clay Borris	Richard Beattie	Roy Sager	Norstar Releasing
Reboot film
Prom Night	April 11, 2008	Nelson McCormick	J. S. Cardone	Neal H. Moritz, Toby Jaffe	Screen Gems

=== Prom Night (1980) ===
In the original Prom Night, a group of children–Wendy, Jude, Kelly, and Nick—inadvertently kill a young girl named Robin during a game. They make a vow of silence, and a sex offender is ultimately blamed for her death. Six years later, Robin's elder sister, Kim (Jamie Lee Curtis) and her fraternal twin brother, Alex, are planning to attend her senior prom at Hamilton High School. The prom falls on the sixth anniversary of Robin's death. Kim's father, the school principal (Leslie Nielsen) grows frightened when the sex offender escapes from a psychiatric facility the day before the school prom. Wendy, Jude, Kelly, and Nick receive obscene phone calls the day of the prom, and Jude, Kelly, and Wendy are dispatched in various violent manners during the dance by a killer dressed in a ski mask. Meanwhile, Kim and Nick are crowned prom queen and king. While waiting backstage before the reveal, Lou, a bully, takes Nick's crown from him. The killer, mistaking Lou for Nick, decapitates him, and his head rolls across the stage. A panic ensues among the promgoers, and Nick and Kim battle with the killer on the dance floor. Kim hits him in the side of the head with the blunt edge of the axe, and the killer stumbles outside. Kim follows him, unmasking him as he collapses outside, only to see that it is her brother, Alex—Alex had witnessed Robin's death, and sought vengeance against those responsible. Alex dies in her arms.

=== Hello Mary Lou: Prom Night II (1987) ===
In the film's sequel, Hello Mary Lou: Prom Night II, a teenage girl, Vicki Carpenter (Wendy Lyon), is preparing to attend the 1987 senior prom at Hamilton High. While searching for a dress in the school's costume room, she discovers a trunk full of mementos and clothing that belonged to Mary Lou Maloney, a teenage student who was burned to death during a prank while being crowned prom queen in 1957. Vicki decides to wear the dress, inadvertently unleashing Mary Lou's vengeful spirit. Mary Lou possesses Vicki, and manipulates those around her, killing several of Vicki's friends along the way. She seduces Vicki's father before killing her mother. At the prom, Vicki attends with her boyfriend, Craig (Louis Ferreira), whose father, Bill (Michael Ironside)—the school principal—was Mary Lou's boyfriend who was responsible for the prank that killed her. As Vicki is crowned prom queen, Bill shoots her, after which her body morphs into the burned corpse of Mary Lou. Mary Lou wreaks havoc, but is placated when Bill places the crown on her head; she kisses him, and disappears. Vicki and Craig leave the prom with Bill, only to realize in his car that he is now possessed by Mary Lou.

=== Prom Night III: The Last Kiss (1990) ===
Mary Lou returns in Prom Night III: The Last Kiss, seducing Alex (Tim Conlon), a handsome high school senior who, though an average student, aspires to go to medical school. She initially benefits him greatly, manipulating his grades at school and helping him become a football star. However, his relationship with the ghostly Mary Lou begins to take its toll on his relationship with real-life girlfriend, Sarah (Cynthia Preston). Meanwhile, Mary Lou indiscriminately kills anyone who comes in her way, eventually killing Alex's friend Shane. Alex is blamed for Shane's gruesome murder. Alex promises to go to Hell with Mary Lou if she promises to stop her reign of terror; she agrees, and he descends to hell with her, followed by Sarah. Sarah fights Mary Lou, and she and Alex appear to escape from hell, but Mary Lou reemerges and kills Sarah, leaving Alex in a time warp in the 1950s, where nobody can see or hear him.

=== Prom Night IV: Deliver Us from Evil (1991) ===
Prom Night IV: Deliver Us from Evil diverges from the Mary Lou Maloney storyline, instead focusing on a group of teenagers who plan to forgo their prom and party at an abandoned seminary. Among them are Meagan (Nicole de Boer) and Mark (J. H. Wyman). Their party is crashed by Father Jonas, a Roman Catholic priest who murdered two students at the 1957 Hamilton High prom before being sequestered away by the church, apparently possessed by a demonic spirit. After Father Jonas kills most of Meagan's friends, she and Mark attempt to fight him, but Jonas stabs Mark to death with a crucifix. Meagan ultimately beats Jonas before leaving him to burn to death in a shed, though he awakens while being transported to the morgue.

=== Prom Night (2008) ===
In the 2008 reboot of Prom Night, high school student Donna Keppel (Brittany Snow) is traumatized after Richard Fenton (Johnathon Schaech) becomes obsessed with her and murders her family. At her high school prom, held in a grand hotel, Fenton arrives and stalks her, disguised as a stranger, having escaped from incarceration. He murders several of Donna's friends before cornering her in the upstairs of the hotel. A chase ensues, but she is ultimately saved by Detective Winn (Idris Elba), who shoots Fenton to death.

== Related film ==
=== The Club (1994 film) ===
The 1994 film The Club had initially been planned by producer Peter Simpson to be released as the fifth entry in the Prom Night film series but decided against it after believing the Prom Night name was waning in drawing power. Despite dropping its original intended title of Prom Night V for its release in the United States, it was released in some territories under that title such as Japan.

== Reception ==
=== Box office ===
Key
†	Denotes a direct-to-video release

Title	Release date		Budget (CAD)	Box office (USD)			Ref.
Title	United States	Canada	Budget (CAD)	United States	International	Worldwide	Ref.
Prom Night (1980)	July 18, 1980	September 12, 1980	$1.5 million	$14.7 million		$14.7 million	
Hello Mary Lou: Prom Night II	October 16, 1987	October 9, 1987	$2.5 million	$2.7 million		$2.7 million	
Prom Night III: The Last Kiss	June 21, 1990 †	April 13, 1990	$1.5 million				
Prom Night IV: Deliver Us from Evil	May 13, 1992 †						
Prom Night (2008)	April 11, 2008		$20 million	$43.9 million	$13.3 million	$57.2 million	

== Cast and characters ==
List indicators
- This table shows the principal characters and the actors who have portrayed them throughout the franchise.
- A dark grey cell indicates the character was not in the film, or that the character's presence in the film has not yet been announced.
- A ^{C} indicates a cameo appearance.
- A ^{P} indicates an appearance in onscreen photographs only.
- A ^{A} indicates an appearance in archival footage only.
- A ^{V} indicates a voice-only role.
- A ^{Y} indicates a younger version of the role.

Character	Original films				Reboot film
Character	Prom Night	Hello Mary Lou Prom Night II	Prom Night III The Last Kiss	Prom Night IV Deliver Us from Evil	Prom Night
Character	1980	1987	1990	1992	2008
Main cast
Kimberly "Kim" Hammond	Jamie Lee Curtis Debbie Greenfield^{Y}				
Alex Hammond	Michael Tough Dean Bosacki^{Y}				
Mr. Hammond	Leslie Nielsen				
Nick McBride	Casey Stevens Brock Simpson^{Y}				
Wendy Richards	Eddie Benton Leslie Scott^{Y}				
Kelly Lynch	Mary Beth Rubens Joyce Kite^{Y}				
Jude Cunningham	Joy Thompson Karen Forbes^{Y}				
Lou Farmer	David Mucci				
Drew Shinnick	Jeff Wincott				
Dr. Fairchild	David Gardner				
Mrs. Hammond	Antoinette Bower				
Vicki Carpenter	Pita Oliver	Wendy Lyon			
Mary Lou Maloney		Lisa Schrage Lorretta Bailey (creature)	Courtney Taylor	Mentioned	
Principal Bill "Billy" Nordham		Michael Ironside Steve Atkinson^{Y}			
Craig Nordham		Justin Louis			
Father Buddy Cooper		Richard Monette Robert Lewis^{Y}			
Kelly Hennelotter		Terri Hawkes			
Walt Carpenter		Wendell Smith			
Virginia Carpenter		Judy Mahbey			
Monica Waters		Beverley Hendry			
Robert Jones		Glen Gretzky			
Alexander "Alex" Grey			Tim Conlon		
Sarah Monroe			Cynthia Preston		
Shane Taylor			David Stratton		
Andrew Douglas			Dylan Neal		
Leonard Welsh			Jeremy Ratchford		
Principal Weatherall			Roger Dunn		
Mr. Walker			George Chuvalo		
Ms. Richards			Lesley Kelly		
Jack Roswell			Terry Doyle		
Meagan				Nicole de Boer	
Mark				J.H. Wyman	
Laura				Joy Tanner	
Jeff				Alle Ghadban	
Jaeger				Kenneth McGregor	
Lisa				Krista Bulmer	
Jonas				James Carver	
Father Colin				Brock Simpson	
Donna Keppel					Brittany Snow
Detective Winn					Idris Elba
Richard Fenton					Johnathon Schaech
Lisa Hines					Dana Davis
Bobby Jones					Scott Porter
Detective Nash					James Ransone
Claire Davis					Jessica Stroup
Ronnie Heflin					Collins Pennie
Michael Allen					Kelly Blatz
Karen Turner					Jessalyn Gilsig
Jack Turner					Linden Ashby

== Merchandise ==
The official soundtrack for Prom Night, released in Japan in 1980, was composed by Paul Zaza and Carl Zittrer, with additional writing by Bill Crutchfield and James Powell. Prom Night was released on VHS in 1981 by MCA Universal in North America, at the beginnings of home video popularity, licensed directly from then-production company SimCom, who had licensed theatrical distribution to Avco-Embassy. A VHS was issued by New Line Home Entertainment, followed by both VHS and DVD editions from Anchor Bay Entertainment in 1997 and 1998, respectively. A restored edition of the film was released on Blu-ray and DVD by Synapse Films in 2014.

Hello Mary Lou: Prom Night II had a VHS edition released by Virgin Vision in May 1988. A DVD was released in 2008 by Metro-Goldwyn-Mayer. In 2003, Artisan Entertainment released a double-feature DVD of Prom Night III: The Last Kiss and Prom Night IV: Deliver Us from Evil; this edition features a censored cut of The Last Kiss, which removes violence, language and nudity. LIVE Entertainment had previously released VHS editions of both films. Sony Pictures Home Entertainment released the 2008 Prom Night on DVD and Blu-ray in August 2008.

== Sources ==
- Newman, Kim (2011). Nightmare Movies: Horror on Screen Since the 1960s. London, England: Bloomsbury. ISBN 978-1-408-80503-9.
- Osborne, Jerry (2010). Movie/TV Soundtracks and Original Cast Recordings Price and Reference Guide. Port Townsend, Washington: Osborne Enterprises. ISBN 978-0-932117-37-3.
