= Peter Simpson (film producer) =

British-Canadian film producer

Peter R. Simpson
- Born: May 29, 1943; Port Glasgow, Scotland, UK
- Died: June 5, 2007 (aged 64); Toronto, Ontario, Canada
- Occupation: Film producer
- Years active: 1971–2007
- Spouse: Ilana C. Frank (m. 1986)

Peter R. Simpson (May 29, 1943 – June 5, 2007) was a British-Canadian film and advertising executive. He was the founder of Toronto- and Los Angeles-based company Simcom, later renamed Norstar Entertainment. During his era, he was one of Canada's foremost producers of commercial features, and occasionally earned plaudits for his contributions to more artistic fare. Dubbed a "Canadian film legend" by the Toronto Star, he received a special Genie Award for lifetime achievements in 2004. Simpson also co-produced films with the United Kingdom, and was a BAFTA Award nominee.

== Career ==
=== Advertising and politics ===
Working since his teens, Simpson settled in the advertising industry, climbing the ranks to the position of media director for Toronto's Stanfield, Johnson and Hill agency. Anticipating the market for media planning and media buying, he created his own Media Buying Services specifically to focus on these areas, a pioneering move at the time. Founded in January 1969, MBS was originally based in North York's Don Mills neighborhood. The following year, it opened an office in London, England, with the help of a local Garland Compton executive. The company grew to have five more locations, among them Montreal, Los Angeles and New York. Simpson relinquished day-to-day control after five years to focus on his entertainment endeavors, and divested himself of his shares in several installments through 1982. MBS remained independent until being acquired by France's Aegis Group in 1996.

A devout conservative, Simpson served as a strategist for the Progressive Conservative Party of Canada (PC) during the Brian Mulroney era. He was head of special election events for his victorious 1984 campaign, and a film policy consultant for his government. Despite his political allegiance, he expressed mixed views of the Mulroney Cabinet's actions towards the industry, praising its attempt at a unified policy, but ultimately saying of the compromised legislation introduced in 1988 by Minister of Communications Flora MacDonald: "If you want to have your cake and eat it too, this is the legislation for you."

Controversy arose when, shortly after the 1984 election, Simpson co-founded a new advertising agency called Media Canada, which was handed the government's advertising budget before it was even incorporated. The contract had originally been offered to Simpson's former Media Buying Services, but its current bosses had judged the terms unacceptable, leading to the formation of the new agency. The nature of those terms came under scrutiny when Roger Nantel, Simpson's partner in Media Canada, candidly revealed that part of his management fee would be used to finance events hosted by the incumbent majority. While the PCs' hiring of a friendly agency was not unheard of—the Liberals had replaced MBS with the left-leaning MacLaren Advertising during their own term in office—Nantel's admission led to accusations of kickbacks from the opposition, and Minister of Supply and Services Harvie Andre commissioned an RCMP investigation to prove the absence of wrongdoing. In 1992, Media Canada merged with part of Vickers & Benson to form Genesis Media, of which Simpson remained a shareholder. Genesis grew to become Canada's largest independent media agency, before being absorbed by Aegis Group in 2007.

=== Attempted purchase of Global ===
In April 1974, Simpson and MBS presented to the CRTC an offer to acquire the Global Television Network, a Canadian network whose recent launch had been plagued by funding shortfalls. The CDN$6 million proposal was backed by publishers Maclean-Hunter and Odeon Theatres, but was passed over in favor of a bid from IWC Communications, which had been the favorite all along.

When IWC, arguing that it had discovered hidden liabilities after taking control of Global, lowballed the company's creditors with an offer to pay them twenty-five cents on the dollar, Simpson again expressed interest in taking over and vouched to give them a better deal. But he was stymied by the strict guarantees demanded by IWC chairman Allan Slaight to cede the company, and the latter's proposal was eventually approved by the creditors in June 1974.

=== Film production ===
Through his business trips to Los Angeles, Simpson gained an interest in the entertainment business. Working with his brother Richard under the banner of the Simcom company, he first specialized in programming sales and syndication, before branching out into feature film production in 1978.

With few connections to the production side of the industry, Simpson initially stuck to what had worked for him as a TV rights broker. His first film was The Sea Gypsies, which replicated the family adventure formula of several programs he had sold for others. When Prom Night was brought to him by director Paul Lynch, Simpson wanted to cast The Brady Bunch's Eve Plumb in the lead to maximize TV revenue, and had to be convinced by Lynch that Jamie Lee Curtis would be a bigger draw, as he was unfamiliar with Halloween. Nonetheless, both The Sea Gypsies and Prom Night proved very lucrative and gave Simpson an immediate foothold in the sector.

Prom Night also established Simpson's hands-on and often prickly production style. The film underwent several reshoots, some of which were helmed by Simpson himself. His next whodunnit Curtains had an even more protracted development, and more interference from Simpson. While credited to its fictional director Jonathan Stryker, half of the finished film was shot by Simpson after sacking original director Richard Ciupka. During the making of Prom Night III, Simpson was present on set, ostensibly to reassure investors about Ron Oliver's directorial debut, but tempers flared between the two and the producer ended up taking co-directorial credit.

Between more commercial films, Simpson capitalized on personal connections to the Canadian recording industry to put together his passion project, 1982's Melanie, a rock star drama which featured Burton Cummings of The Guess Who and Lisa Dal Bello. The picture was positively received, earning three Genie Awards, although one was later rescinded on a technicality. The following year, Simpson directed a documentary on the same subject, My Own Way to Rock, for Canadian premium cable channel First Choice. A music enthusiast, he occasionally wrote songs for his own movies such as Bullies, a rural revenge story described by director Paul Lynch as a counterpoint to the lighthearted wildlife adventure of Simpson's first production The Sea Gypsies. Seldom remembered today, the film was criticized for its violence and turned down for subsidies by Telefilm Canada, but proved lucrative after it was picked up for U.S. distribution by Universal.

In 1984, Simpson co-founded Norstar, a new company with an emphasis on distribution, into which Simcom was soon merged, giving him a vertically integrated organization. Norstar scaled back its distribution business in the 1990s, although Simpson's production and sales labels kept the name. In the later part of the decade, Simpson negotiated a corporate restructuring, which was completed in 1997 and saw him relinquish the rights to much of his content library. He also formed a partnership with British screenwriter and producer Allan Scott. The collaboration resulted in some more highbrow material, including adaptations of the novels Regeneration and The Fourth Angel, with the former earning him a BAFTA Award nomination. Simpson spoke out against the U.K.'s 2003 curtailing of its co-production treaty with Canada.

Towards the end of his career, Simpson stepped in to produce the critically acclaimed but financially troubled series The Eleventh Hour, which had been launched by his wife under her own production imprint, resulting in a final, Gemini Award-winning season in 2004–05. He died during post-production of their following miniseries Would Be Kings, a modern reimagining of Shakespeare's Henry IV, for which he received another posthumous nomination.

== Legacy ==
In addition to his business endeavors, Simpson was a board member of the Toronto International Film Festival for ten years, and was named by The Montreal Gazette as one of the event's top fundraisers. TIFF co-founder and fellow Scottish-born Canadian Bill Marshall, some of whose works he distributed, has a cameo in Curtains. For his contributions to Canadian cinema, Simpson was presented with a special Genie Award in 2004. He was also inducted by Playback, the Canadian film industry's publication of record, into their hall of fame in 2015.

Simpson, who professed his commercial sensibilities and disdain for Canada's cultural establishment, was known for his confrontational attitude. When Ontario premier Mike Harris called for Norstar to be denied access to public facilities in retaliation for planning a biopic of serial killers Paul Bernardo and Karla Homolka, the producer sardonically replied that he would "sleep better for this". His career Genie acceptance speech also earned notice for some coarse language and an attack on Creative Artists Agency's privileged relationship with Telefilm Canada.

While collaborator Ron Oliver was thankful to Simpson for the opportunities that kickstarted his career, he acknowledged that "Peter's personality is bigger than life, and I think some people find it hard to work with him." Composer Paul Zaza assessed: "You would not win an argument with Peter, all you could do was keep it at bay, hope that he would stop thinking about it and find another argument. He was just so gruff and crude". However, he commanded Simpson's trajectory, saying: "He was a street smart Scotsman from Glasgow who came over here with fifty cents in his pockets and nothing but moxie, and sheer ingenuity. He made millions and made lots of films, and a lot of people made millions off of Peter."

== Personal life ==
Simpson was born in Port Glasgow, Scotland, to a blue-collar family. His father worked as a grocer. They emigrated to Toronto when he was ten years old. In 1986, he married production executive Ilana C. Frank, who worked for Norstar before launching her own outfit. He had two sons, Brock and Brad, and a daughter, Quinn. While based in Toronto, he also spent time in Southern California, and owned a secondary residence in West Hollywood in his later years. Simpson, who had been a heavy smoker earlier in his life, died in 2007, suffering from lung cancer.

== Selected filmography ==
=== Film ===
Year	Title	Director	Notes
1978	The Sea Gypsies	Stewart Raffill	
1980	Prom Night	Paul Lynch	
1982	Melanie	Rex Bromfield	
1983	Curtains	Richard Ciupka; Peter Simpson	
1986	Bullies	Paul Lynch	
1987	Blindside	Paul Lynch	
1987	Hello Mary Lou: Prom Night II	Bruce Pittman	
1988	A Switch in Time	Paul Donovan	
1989	Cold Comfort	Vic Sarin	Executive producer only
1990	Prom Night III: The Last Kiss	Ron Oliver; Peter R. Simpson	
1991	Prom Night IV: Deliver Us from Evil	Clay Borris	
1992	Oh, What a Night	Eric Till	
1993	Cold Sweat	Gail Harvey	
1993	Blown Away	Brenton Spencer	
1993	The Dark	Craig Pryce	
1994	Boulevard	Penelope Buitenhuis	
1994	The Club	Brenton Spencer	Executive producer only
1995	No Contest	Paul Lynch	
1995	Jungleground	Don Allan	
1995	Iron Eagle IV: On the Attack	Sidney J. Furie	
1996	No Contest II: Access Denied	Paul Lynch	
1997	The Rage	Sidney J. Furie	
1997	Regeneration	Gillies MacKinnon	Released in the U.S. as Behind the Lines
1997	Pale Saints	J.H. Wyman	
1997	Men with Guns	Kari Skogland	
1998	A Brooklyn State of Mind	Frank Rainone	
1998	The Highwayman	Keoni Waxman	
1999	Grizzly Falls	Stewart Raffill	
2001	The Fourth Angel	John Irvin	
2006	The Marsh	Jordan Barker	

=== Television ===
Year	Title	Director	Notes
1986	Mania	Paul Lynch; David M. Robertson; John Sheppard	Four-part miniseries
1989	Murder by Night	Paul Lynch	Television film
1993	Spenser: Ceremony	Paul Lynch; Andrew Wild	Television film
1994	Spenser: Pale Kings and Princes	Vic Sarin	Television film
2004–2005	The Eleventh Hour	Various	13 episodes Broadcast in the U.S. as Bury the Lead
2008	Would Be Kings	David Wellington	Two-part miniseries; posthumous release

== Awards and nominations ==
Year	Association	Category	Work	Result
1987	Academy of Canadian Cinema & Television – Genie Awards	Best Original Song	"Out of the Fire" (from the film Bullies)	Nominated
1999	Academy of Canadian Cinema & Television – Genie Awards	Best Motion Picture	Regeneration	Nominated
2004	Academy of Canadian Cinema & Television – Genie Awards	Special Achievement		Won
1998	British Academy of Film and Television Arts – BAFTA Film Awards	Alexander Korda Award for Best British Film	Regeneration	Nominated
2005	Academy of Canadian Cinema & Television – Gemini Awards	Best Dramatic Series	The Eleventh Hour	Won
2008	Academy of Canadian Cinema & Television – Gemini Awards	Best Dramatic Miniseries	Would Be Kings	Nominated
