= Prom Night (1980 film) =

1980 film by Paul Lynch

- Original theatrical release poster
- Directed by: Paul Lynch
- Screenplay by: William Gray
- Story by: Robert Guza Jr.
- Produced by: Peter Simpson
- Starring: Leslie Nielsen; Jamie Lee Curtis
- Cinematography: Robert New
- Edited by: Brian Ravok
- Music by: Carl Zittrer; Paul Zaza
- Production companies: Simcom Productions; Prom Night Productions
- Distributed by: Astral Films (Canada); Avco Embassy Pictures (United States)
- Release dates: July 18, 1980 (United States); August 8, 1980 (Canada)
- Running time: 93 minutes
- Country: Canada
- Language: English
- Budget: $1.5 million
- Box office: $14.8 million (Note: Contemporary box office data websites Box Office Mojo and The Numbers indicate a box office gross of $14,796,236. However, in the 1987 book American Film Distribution: The Changing Marketplace, Suzanne Donahue notes the box office totals as being $6 million.)

Prom Night is a 1980 Canadian slasher film directed by Paul Lynch, from a screenplay by William Gray and story by Robert Guza Jr.. Starring Leslie Nielsen and Jamie Lee Curtis, the film follows four high school seniors who are targeted at their prom by a masked killer who is seeking vengeance for the accidental death of a young girl six years earlier. Prom Night was released in the United States on July 18, 1980, by Embassy Pictures. The film's cast also includes Casey Stevens, Eddie Benton, Mary Beth Rubens, Michael Tough, Robert A. Silverman, and Antoinette Bower.

Paul Lynch began developing Prom Night after a meeting with Irwin Yablans, producer of Halloween (1978), who suggested he make a horror film similarly centered around a holiday. Instead, William Gray wrote a screenplay adapted from a revenge-themed story by Robert Guza Jr. (an acquaintance of Lynch), using a school prom as its setting. Prom Night was filmed in late 1979 in Toronto, Canada.

The film was a significant financial success, breaking American weekend box office records in various cities, and grossing over $14 million. It was concurrently distributed by Astral Films in Canada, where it was the country's highest-earning horror film of 1980. Critical reaction to the film was mixed, with some disliking its depictions of violence against young women, while others alternately praised it for its more subtle onscreen violence. Prom Night received some critical accolades, garnering Genie Award nominations for editing and also for the leading performance of Curtis at the 2nd Genie Awards. An alternative cut of the film was popularly aired on American and Canadian TV networks in 1981, and a soundtrack album was released in Japan the same year by RCA Records.

In the intervening years, Prom Night has accrued a substantial cult following, and has been cited by some film scholars as one of the most influential slasher films of the period. The film has had an extensive home-video release history from numerous distributors across various formats, with a VHS release in the 1980s, and its first DVD edition issued by Anchor Bay Entertainment in 1998. A remastered Blu-ray edition of the film was released by Synapse Films in 2014.

== Plot ==
In 1974, 11-year-olds Wendy Richards, Jude Cunningham, Kelly Lynch, and Nick McBride play hide-and-seek in an abandoned convent. When 10-year-old Robin Hammond tries to join them, the group scares her, leading to Robin accidentally falling to her death through a window. The children make a pact not to tell anyone what happened in fear of getting in trouble. As the four flee the convent, the shadow of an unseen person who witnessed Robin's death appears.

Six years later, Robin's elder sister, Kim, and fraternal twin brother, Alex, are preparing for the school prom, which falls on the anniversary of Robin's death. Kelly, Jude, and Wendy receive anonymous obscene phone calls, while Nick ignores his ringing phone.

Kim and Nick are now dating. Jude is asked to the prom by goofy jokester Seymour "Slick" Crane. Kelly is going with Drew Shinnick, her boyfriend. Wendy—Nick's ex-girlfriend—asks school bully Lou Farmer to the prom with the purpose of embarrassing Nick and Kim. In the locker room, Kim and Kelly are startled when an unseen assailant shatters a mirror. Later, Wendy, Jude, and Kelly each find their yearbook photos stabbed with a piece of glass. Meanwhile, Kim and Alex's father, school principal Mr. Hammond, learns that Leonard Murch, a sex offender informally blamed for Robin's death, has escaped from a psychiatric facility. Lt. McBride, Nick's father, investigates.

At the prom, a figure wearing a ski mask targets Kelly first, slitting her throat with a mirror shard in the girls' locker room after she rejects Drew's sexual advances. Later, Jude and Slick have sex in his van outside school grounds. The masked killer appears, stabbing Jude in the throat with the mirror shard before causing Slick to drive off a cliff to his death. Meanwhile, while staking out the prom, McBride is informed that the sex offender blamed for Robin's death has been captured.

Now wielding an ax, the killer chases Wendy through an empty wing of the school before cornering her in a utility closet and hacking her to death. Mr. Sykes, the school janitor, witnesses Wendy's murder and attempts to warn the principal, but his claims are not taken seriously due to his drunkenness. Meanwhile, Kim and Nick prepare to be crowned prom king and queen, but Lou and his lackeys tie up Nick, and Lou takes his crown. Mistaking him for Nick, the killer decapitates him. Lou's severed head rolls onto the stage, sending the prom-goers fleeing in horror.

Kim frees Nick, and they are confronted by the killer. In the ensuing brawl, Kim strikes the killer in the head with the ax. The two briefly lock eyes before the assailant runs outside, clutching his head wound. Kim chases after him and begs approaching police officers not to shoot, before the killer collapses on the ground. He is revealed to be Alex, who, in his last moments, exclaims tearfully, "They killed her!" Alex dies in Kim's arms, crying out Robin's name.

== Cast ==
- Leslie Nielsen as Mr. Hammond
- Jamie Lee Curtis as Kimberly "Kim" Hammond
  - Debbie Greenfield as Young Kim Hammond
- Casey Stevens as Nick McBride
  - Brock Simpson as Young Nick McBride
- Eddie Benton as Wendy Richards
  - Leslie Scott as Young Wendy Richards
- Antoinette Bower as Mrs. Hammond
- Michael Tough as Alex Hammond
  - Dean Bosacki as Young Alex Hammond
- Robert Silverman as Mr. Sykes
- Pita Oliver as Vicki Carpenter
- David Mucci as Lou Farmer
- Jeff Wincott as Drew Shinnick
- Mary Beth Rubens as Kelly Lynch
  - Joyce Kite as Young Kelly Lynch
- George Touliatos as Lieutenant McBride
- Melanie Morse MacQuarrie as Henri-Anne
- David Gardner as Dr. Fairchild
- Joy Thompson as Jude Cunningham
  - Karen Forbes as Young Jude Cunningham
- Sheldon Rybowski as Seymour "Slick" Crane
- Rob Garrison as Sayer
- David Bolt as Weller
- Beth Amos as Housekeeper
- Liz Stalker-Mason as Adele
- Pam Henry as Car Hop
- Tammy Bourne as Robin Hammond

== Production ==
=== Development ===
Director Paul Lynch developed Prom Night after a meeting with producer Irwin Yablans, who had previously produced Halloween (1978). Lynch had wanted to work on a horror film, and had initially pitched Don't Go See the Doctor, a film about a physician who murders his patients. Yablans instead suggested that Lynch utilize a holiday as a basis for the film, which resulted in Lynch deciding to build the premise around the event of the high school prom. Writer Robert Guza Jr., a USC film student of whom Lynch was an acquaintance, had written a story about a group of teenagers whose involvement in a tragic event as children came back to haunt them. Lynch described Guza's story as "Stephen King-like," with an opening sequence in which several children accidentally kill a young classmate during a game of hide-and-seek.

William Gray, a former Toronto Sun rock music critic who had recently co-written the supernatural horror film The Changeling (1980), was hired to adapt Guza's story into a feature-length screenplay. Gray utilized Guza's central premise, expanding it into a revenge-themed slasher film. Commenting on his writing, Gray said: "To do horror, you have to be a craftsman, not an artist. I'm not an artist. I'm the kind of guy who writes what people suggest. I'm a hired writer." While Gray is the sole credited screenwriter, the subplot involving Leonard Murch, a child sex offender blamed for Robin's death, was written by an uncredited John Hunter.

While attending a Telefilm Canada event in Los Angeles, Lynch met producer Peter Simpson, to whom he pitched the idea. "I said, 'I'm working on this thing that is called Prom Night," Lynch recalled. "[Peter] said, 'Look, let's get together and talk.' This was on a Thursday. On Monday, he read the treatment, came back and said, 'We'll make a deal to develop a script and do Prom Night.' And that's how Prom Night came about."

=== Casting ===
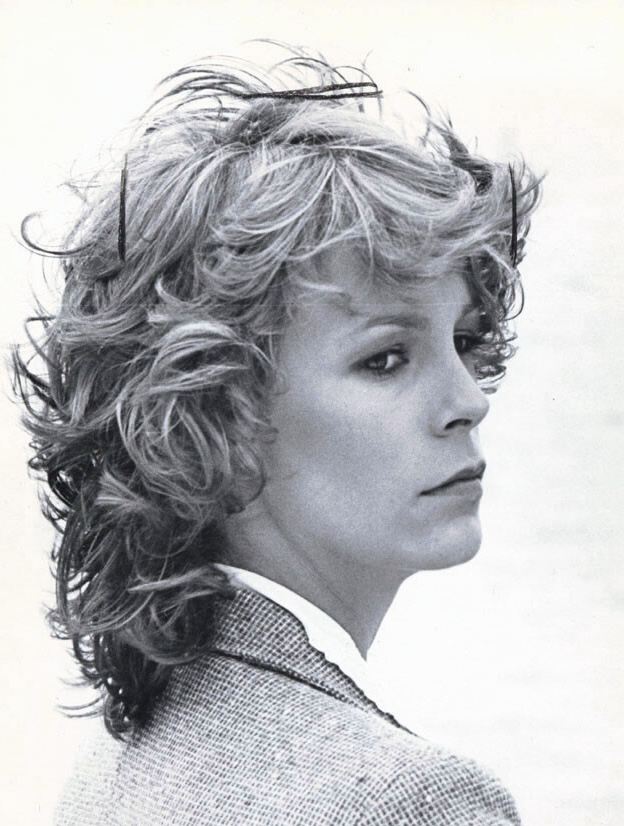
Jamie Lee Curtis as Kim Hammond in Prom Night

In the documentary Going to Pieces (2006), Lynch stated he was having difficulty securing financing for the film until Jamie Lee Curtis signed onto the project. She received a salary of $30,000 (equivalent to $117,225 in 2025) for her appearance in the film. Eve Plumb (from TV's The Brady Bunch) originally auditioned for the role of Kim Hammond and was slated to play the role, but was ultimately passed over after Curtis' manager contacted Lynch about her starring in the film. Lynch was enthusiastic about casting Curtis, as she had established herself in the horror genre portraying Laurie Strode in Halloween (1978), and after auditioning for Simpson—which included a dance audition for the film's dance numbers—Curtis was officially cast in the role. Lynch recalled, "For whatever reason, Peter [Simpson] made her jump through hoops, but she wanted it, and she got it." According to Curtis, Prom Night was the first project for which she "made any money."

Leslie Nielsen, an established film and TV actor, was cast as Kim Hammond's father; this role marks one of the last serious films for Nielsen, as he spent the remainder of his career performing in comedies. Lynch sought Nielsen for the role as he was one of Canada's "most-experienced actors." Opposite Nielsen, portraying his character's wife, is Antoinette Bower, whom Lynch had seen on numerous Canadian TV programs. Lynch cast Bower in the role as he felt she offered an "off-putting" sensibility that would make her a viable suspect in the film's story.

The majority of the film's supporting actors and actresses were stage performers and recent theater graduates from the University of Toronto. Michael Tough, a 17-year-old actor who was cast as Kim's younger brother, Alex, recalled that he and Curtis spent an afternoon together shopping to become familiar with each other and establish a sibling-like dynamic. Mary Beth Rubens, who appears as Kim's ill-fated friend, Kelly Lynch, had recently graduated from the Montreal Theatre School when she was cast in the role. Joy Thompson was cast as Jude Cunningham, another of Kim's friends, stalked by the killer.

Canadian actor Robert A. Silverman, who was cast in the role of the mysterious school janitor Mr. Sykes, was still recovering from injuries sustained when he was struck by an automobile three years prior to making the film. Lynch felt that Silverman's "off-kilter" performance, owing to his physical ailments at the time, contributed to the character's mysteriousness.

=== Filming ===
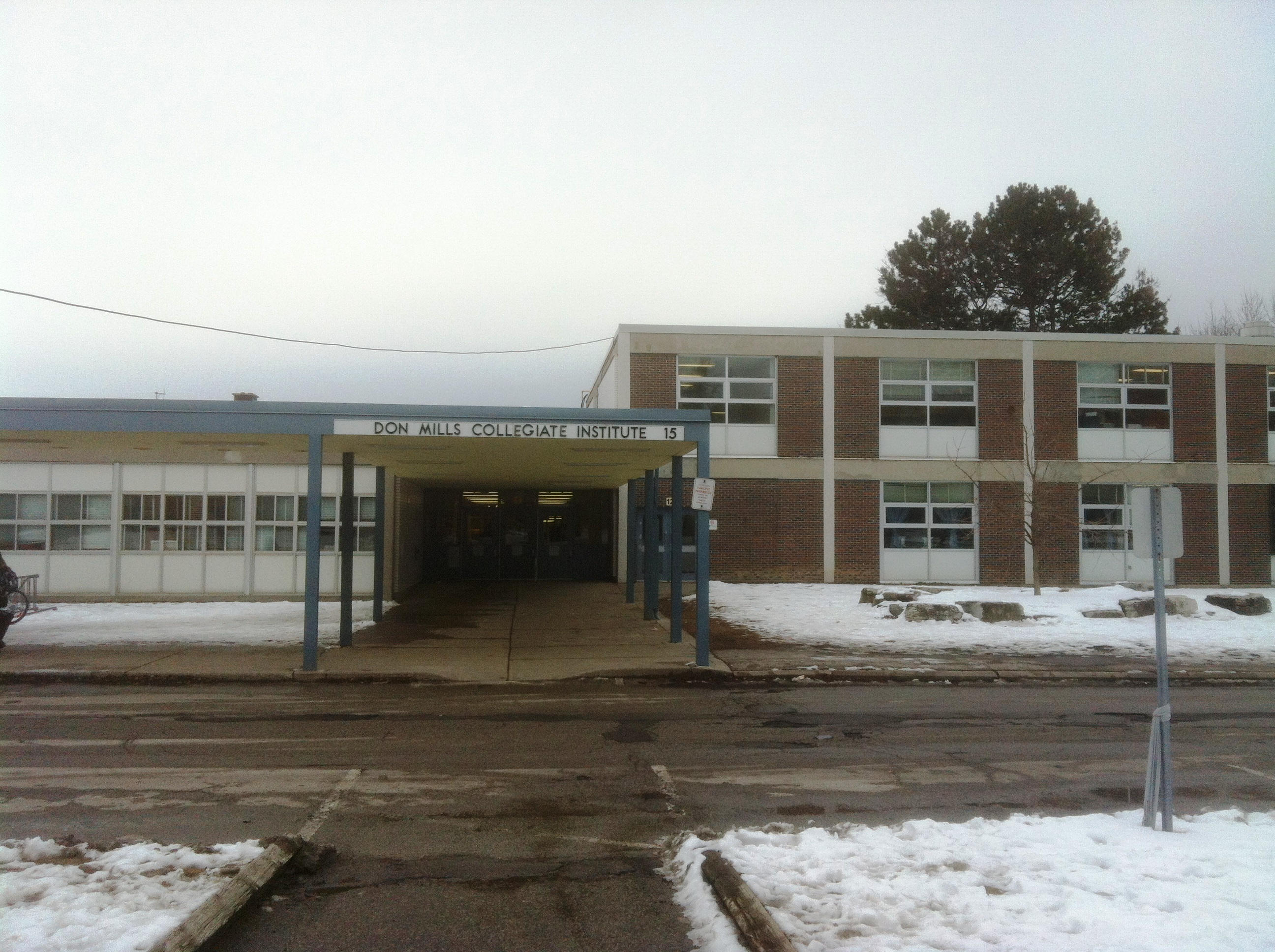
The Don Mills Collegiate Institute served as the school location, as seen in 2016

Prom Night was filmed over 24 days in Toronto, with principal photography beginning August 13, 1979, and completing September 13. The majority of the crew were recent graduates from film schools in Canada. Don Mills Collegiate Institute served as the main school location, and numerous students from the institute were hired to appear as extras.

The Langstaff Jail Farm in Richmond Hill was used for the abandoned convent featured prominently at the beginning of the film, which was demolished shortly after. Art director Reuben Freed had wanted to take advantage of Toronto's Victorian architecture, and felt that the Langstaff building had an appropriate Gothic appearance. Commenting on the production design, Freed said:

Making the environments, creating the sense of terror, creating from the fabric of what was around me... This was Toronto, this Victorian city, [and] there were a lot of interesting buildings to work with, and I quickly saw what was available.

Because of the way the film is structured, most of the cast spend little time together, as each appears in their own subplot leading up to (and during) the prom. The initial shoot took place in the school, as the crew had to complete before school was back in session in late August, while the remainder of the shoot was spent filming the sequences at the various characters' homes. The filming of the dance numbers, which were choreographed by Lynch's sister, was completed without the use of a Steadicam. Lynch stated that he was "amazed they turned out as well as they did", as the crew had little experience with filming such sequences.

=== Special effects ===
In terms of on-screen violence, Lynch had intentionally devised the film to have a minimal amount of gore, as he did not want it to be overtly gratuitous; however, the distributor, Avco Embassy Pictures, mandated that they include some graphic violence, resulting in the on-screen beheading of Lou Farmer in the finale. In order to make the sequence appear realistic, the special effects team decided to build a prop floor through which the actor, David Mucci, could place his head, creating the illusion of his severed head lying on the floor. For the filming of the decapitation, a dummy head was crafted via prosthetics, and moulded around a prop skull.

== Music ==
The Prom Night score and soundtrack were composed by Paul Zaza and Carl Zittrer, with additional writing by Bill Crutchfield and James Powell. Director Lynch sought Zittrer after hearing his compositions in Black Christmas (1974) and Murder by Decree (1979). The film's score features a use of "texture-heavy, orchestral underscores" which Zaza and Zittrer recorded using 35mm magnetic music tape, manually smoothing out the tape's edges with sandpaper and razors to create fade outs.

In addition to the score, Prom Night features multiple original disco songs by Zaza and Zittrer, which are featured prominently in the film's prom scenes. Originally, the film was shot with the actors dancing to then-popular disco tracks, but, according to Zaza, the publishing rights to the songs were far outside the film's budget. Under orders from producer Peter Simpson, Zaza wrote a series of original disco songs over a five-day period, which closely copied the original tracks that were intended to be used in the film, notably mimicking the tempo. According to Zaza: "Simply put, our songs needed to "sound like" something you've already heard... We believed that if we could emulate the style of these hits by using similar drum patters, orchestrations, vocal arrangements, and mixing and production techniques, we could create a disco "environment" for the film that would work well with the plot." The similarities between the songs prompted a $10 million lawsuit against the film's producers, which was eventually settled for $50,000.

An official release of the Prom Night soundtrack was issued in Japan in 1981 by RCA Records, featuring both the musical score and the original disco songs from the film. A standalone 7-inch single was also released, featuring two tracks written for but not featured in the film: "All Is Gone" and "Forever", both performed by Blue Bazar. Two different reissues of the soundtrack were released in 2019 on vinyl, one by 1984 Publishing, and another by Perseverance Records.

== Release ==
=== Distribution and marketing ===
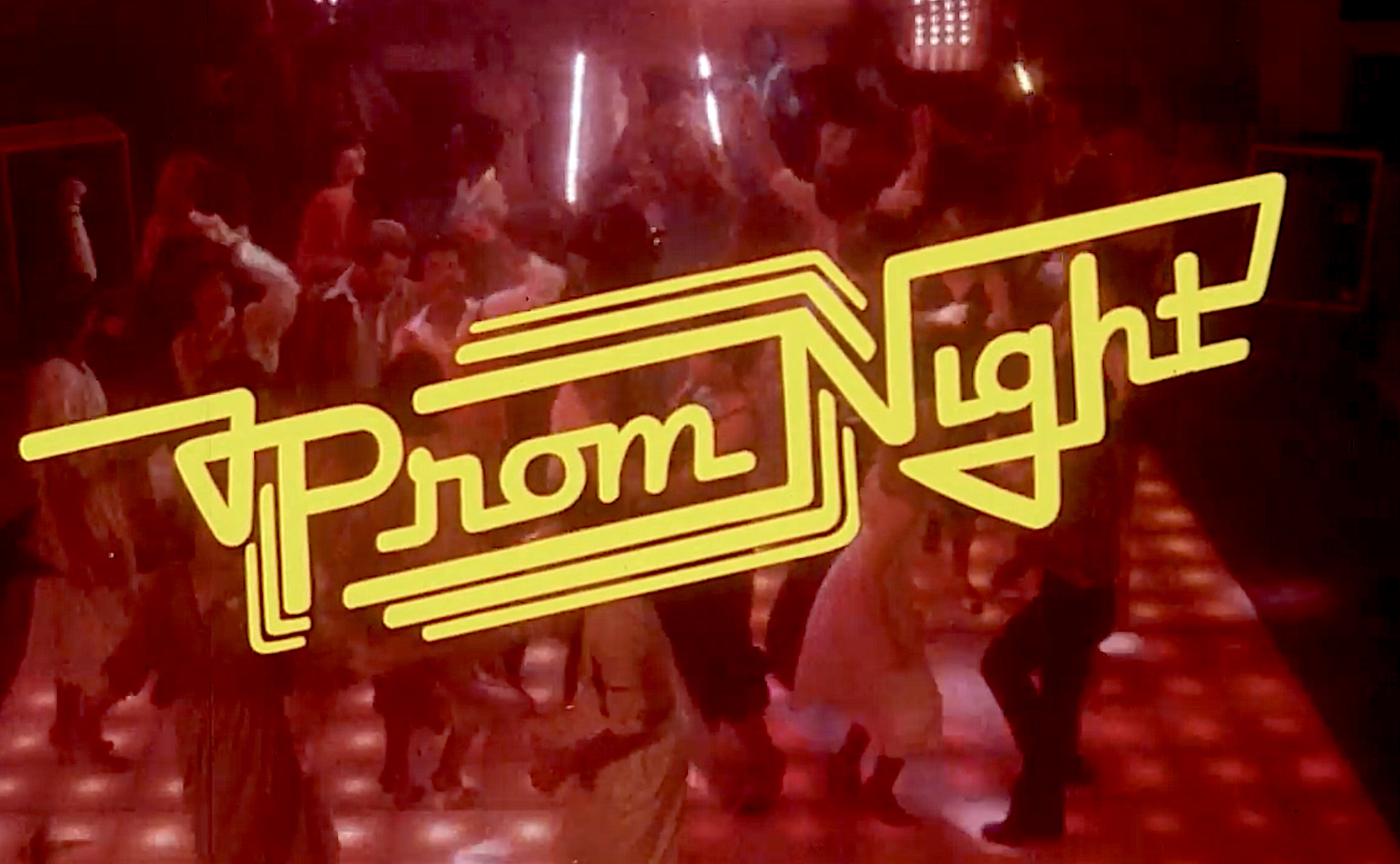
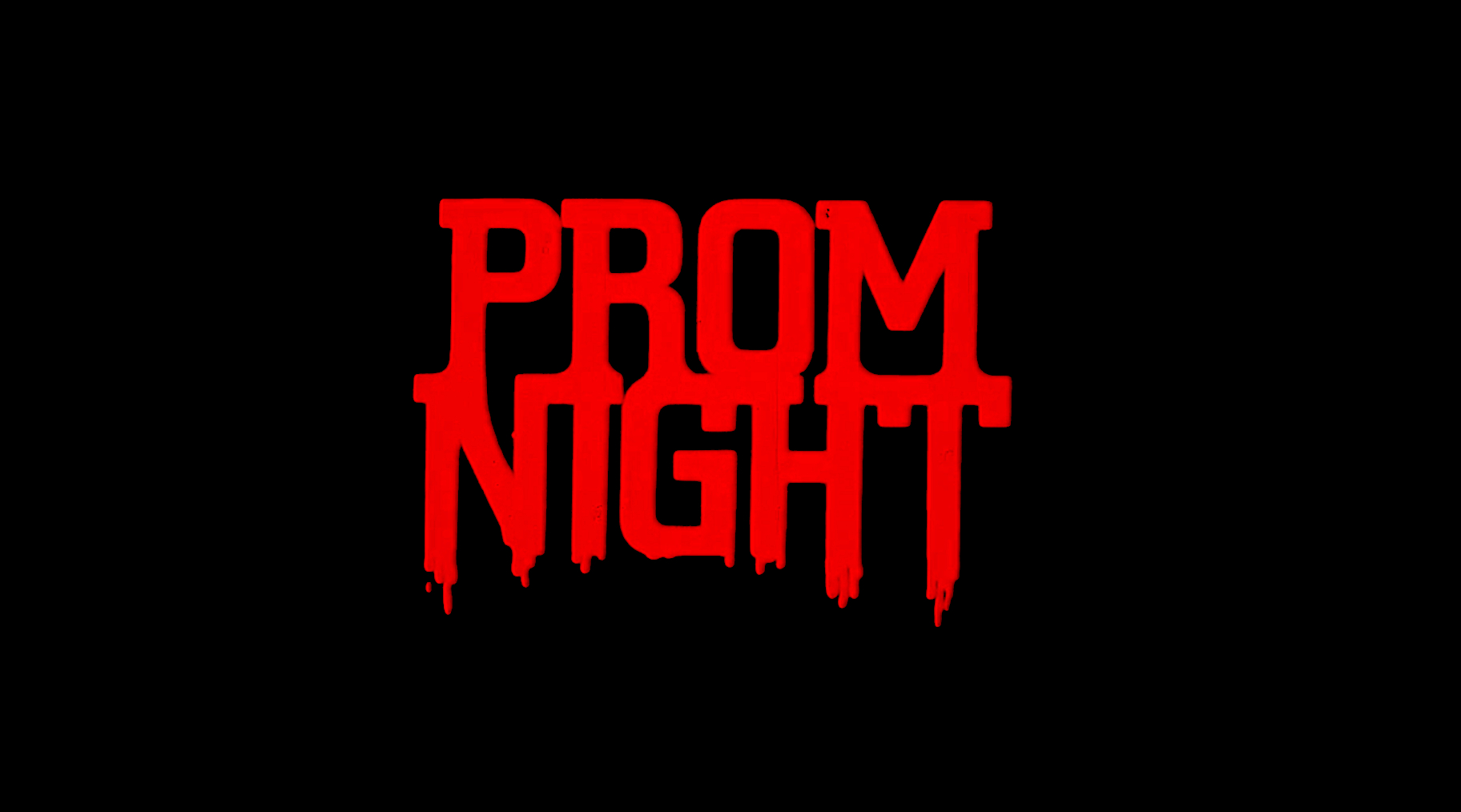
The theatrical trailer for Prom Night features differing opening and closing title logos, contrasting its disco-themed setting and horror elements

Paramount Pictures expressed interest in distributing Prom Night, but producer Peter Simpson declined when the studio offered to give the film only a limited release. Instead, Paramount released another independent slasher film, Friday the 13th, which premiered two months before Prom Night. Avco Embassy Pictures ultimately purchased U.S. distribution rights to Prom Night at the Cannes Film Market in May 1980, and created 250 prints of the film for theatrical exhibition.

Avco Embassy Pictures heavily marketed Prom Night to female audiences by emphasizing its female characters and prom setting, highlighting "dance, romance, and female beauty rituals... while taking steps to avoid the alienation of the male youths that were considered to dominate horror film attendance. Film scholar Richard Nowell describes the film's theatrical trailer as an "exact replica" of that for Carrie (1976). The trailer opens with footage of prom-goers dancing to disco music, followed by a title logo reminiscent of that for the disco film Saturday Night Fever (1977). The trailer's closing title features an alternate red logo with blood dripping from each letter. Nowell notes that the opening logo deliberately targets a female audience, while the closing logo "signal[s] the presence of horror-related content" typically marketed toward male youth.

Television spots for the film similarly emphasized its female characters, opening with a montage of young women preparing for the prom with a male narrator stating: "These are the girls of Hamilton High, and tonight they will be more beautiful than ever before in their lives." The second half of the television spots contrasts the glamorous imagery with nine shots which "established the film to be an intriguing whodunit by showing a mysterious ax-wielding figure lurking in the shadows," reinforcing "the coexistence of romance with horror, thrills, and intrigue."

The film's advertising campaign was maligned by American critics Gene Siskel and Roger Ebert in a September 18, 1980 episode of Sneak Previews, cited among a glut of other violent slasher films released the same year that thematized "Women in Danger." Siskel and Ebert used the episode to criticize the advertising campaigns for several films, including Don't Answer the Phone!, Hell Night and Prom Night: "[These] ads have been saturating television for the past two years," said Ebert, "and the summer and fall of 1980 are the worst yet."

After its first week of release in the United States, Avco Embassy Pictures announced a promotional tour for the film, which would have star Curtis appearing at premieres in various cities, such as New York City, D.C., Baltimore, Cincinnati, Denver, and Los Angeles. Additionally, 10,000 promotional "scream pillows" were to be distributed at screenings to help quiet the outbursts of theater patrons. Curtis appeared on a July 18, 1980 episode of the talk show Fantasy Film Festival to promote the film, where she was interviewed by Mick Garris.

=== Theatrical run ===
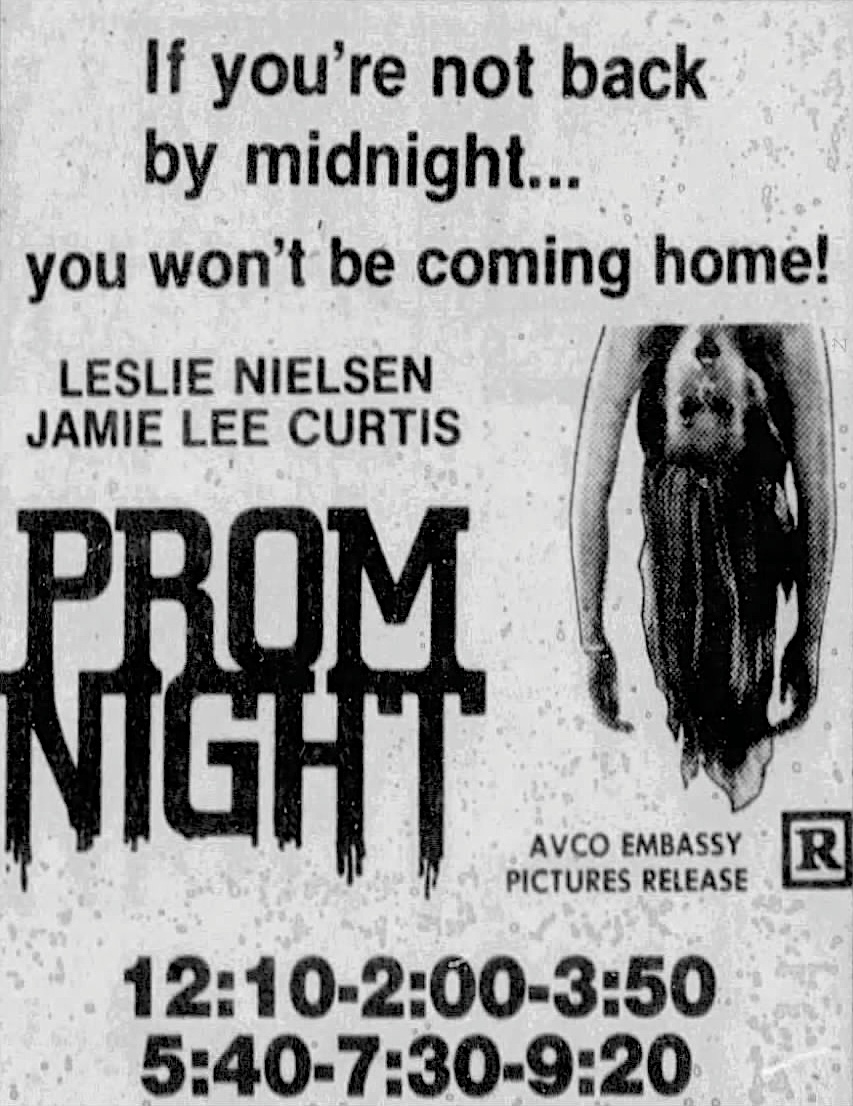
Newspaper advertisement in The Berkeley Gazette (August 29, 1980)

Prom Night was released in select cities in the U.S. on July 18, 1980. Its U.S. theatrical run expanded in the subsequent weeks, with openings on July 25, 1980, in Houston; August 1, 1980, in Cleveland; and August 6, 1980, in Portland. The film opened in Los Angeles and New York City on August 15, 1980, with select midnight screenings in the latter.

In Canada, the film was distributed by Astral Films, who released it regionally in Regina, Saskatchewan, beginning August 8, 1980. It premiered in Calgary the following week, on August 15, 1980, and in Toronto on September 12, 1980.

The film received some theatrical distribution in the United Kingdom, screening in Cheshire in October 1980, and in Lancashire, Birmingham, and Worcester in November 1980. Screenings began in London on February 5, 1981. In Australia, the film opened in Melbourne on December 26, 1980.

=== Television broadcast ===
In late 1980, Canada's CTV Network paid a record $200,000 for three TV airings of Prom Night. The film was also acquired for TV broadcast in the United States on NBC, which purchased two prime time showings of the film for $3.25 million. In order to slightly lengthen the film after nudity was excised for TV airings, an alternate cut of Prom Night was crafted by editor Michael MacLaverty. The TV version of the film features some additional scenes that were excised from the original theatrical cut, as well as extended sequences that had been truncated. Among these are a scene in which Mr. and Mrs. Hammond meet with Dr. Fairchild (David Gardner), a psychologist evaluating Mrs. Hammond; three brief scenes featuring Adele (Liz Stalker-Mason), a temporary school secretary who is encountered by Mr. Hammond and Kim, respectively; a sequence in which Jude, Vicki (Pita Oliver) and Kim pass notes during biology class; and Kim returning home and speaking briefly with her mother.

The TV cut of Prom Night premiered in Canada on CTV Network at 9:00 p.m. on February 21, 1981, with a U.S. premiere occurring the following night on NBC. The film's Canadian telecast premiere was marked by a timing error in which the film started at the midway point. After 20 minutes had elapsed, the telecast was abruptly halted and momentarily replaced with an episode of the series Foul Play. At 10:00 p.m., one hour after the premiere had been scheduled to start, the film was aired from the beginning, resulting in the network's late-night news beginning an hour later than usual.

=== Home media ===
Prom Night has been released in numerous formats on home video by various distributors. It was originally released in North America in 1981 by MCA Universal on LaserDisc, VHS, and Betamax. This initial home video release grossed approximately $6 million in rentals. In the United Kingdom, a LaserDisc was issued by Embassy Home Entertainment in 1983.

In 1988, the film was re-released on VHS in North America by Virgin Vision in tandem with the in-name-only sequel Hello Mary Lou: Prom Night II, which Virgin handled through a separate deal with that film's then-distributor The Samuel Goldwyn Company. The film received VHS reissues from two different distributors in 1997: One by Anchor Bay Entertainment (available in both standard and widescreen collector's editions), and another by New Line Home Entertainment. The same year, Elite Entertainment issued a new LaserDisc edition.

Prom Night was first released on DVD by Anchor Bay Entertainment on February 18, 1998, with a re-mastered widescreen transfer. By 2000, Anchor Bay's DVD release had gone out of print and become a rarity, prompting fans to start online petitions for a re-release. In 2004, Platinum Disc Corporation released a full frame DVD sourced from a video transfer, licensed by Alliance Atlantis. In October 2007, Echo Bridge Entertainment released a third North American DVD release. The film was reissued by Echo Bridge Entertainment several times on DVD in multi-film sets alongside other unrelated horror titles, as well as the film's three sequels: Hello Mary Lou: Prom Night II (1987), Prom Night III: The Last Kiss (1990), and Prom Night IV: Deliver Us from Evil (1991).

On September 9, 2014, the film was released on Blu-ray and DVD by Synapse Films, featuring a restored print from the original film negatives, as well as a documentary, outtakes, original promotional material, and deleted scenes from the network TV cut as bonus material. The British distributor 101 Films released a Blu-ray edition in the United Kingdom on December 2, 2019, featuring newly-commissioned extras, including an interview with director Paul Lynch.

In January 2026, Synapse Films announced a forthcoming 4K UHD Blu-ray release featuring a new Dolby Vision remaster with Dolby Atmos audio.

== Reception ==
=== Box office ===
With a limited release in the United States on July 18, 1980, Prom Night was a financial success as a sleeper hit. During its opening week in select cities (including Chicago, Milwaukee, Louisville, and several cities in Texas), it grossed $1,189,636 at the U.S. box office, and was subsequently slated for a staggered platform release.

During its opening week runs in New York and Los Angeles, the film earned a combined $1.3 million, and marked Avco Embassy's highest-grossing Los Angeles opening to date, as well as breaking weekend records in Philadelphia and New England. The film continued to prove financially successful through Labor Day, earning $2.1 million over the holiday weekend.

By October 1980, the film had grossed $12 million. It was reported later that month that the film's North American box office revenue had exceeded $14 million, $636,000 of which was grossed in Canada. By the end of its theatrical run, Prom Night had grossed a total of $14.8 million at the U.S. box office with approximately 5,500,460 admissions. Canadian journalist Ron Base described the film as "the Meatballs of 1980", referring to that film's similar commercial success in the United States.

=== Critical response ===
==== Contemporary ====
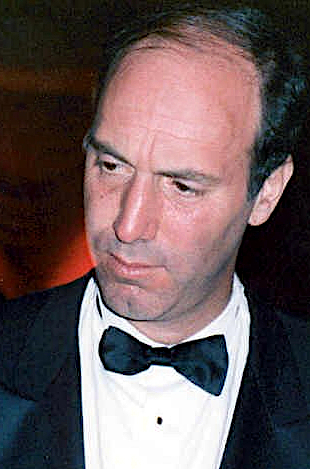
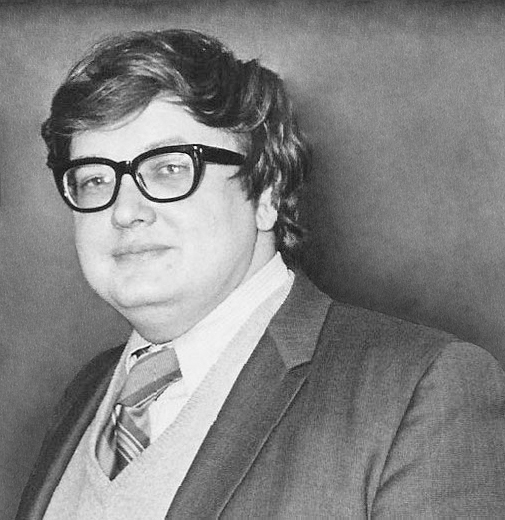
Critics Gene Siskel (left) and Roger Ebert (right) both gave the film unfavorable reviews and criticized its marketing campaign for thematizing violence against women

Numerous critics compared Prom Night to Jamie Lee Curtis's previous film, Halloween (1978), as well as Brian De Palma's Carrie (1976), a horror film also revolving around a high school prom. (Note: Attributed to multiple critical reviews.) Gene Siskel of the Chicago Tribune described it as a "watered-down cross" of both films, though he noted it was "not as violent as one might expect, based on those frightening ads of a masked man holding a phallic knife... You would think that Prom Night was another one of those hideous attacks-on-promiscuous-women pictures. It's not. Gender makes no difference in this routine revenge film." Jamie Lamb of the Vancouver Sun similarly compared it to both Halloween and Carrie, adding that it "isn't entertaining, nor is it particularly violent. It seems a hodge-podge of characters and tricks from other movies intended for a young audience, which is now heading back to school." Jack Mathews of the Detroit Free Press also compared it to the two aforementioned films before noting it as being "not as effective as either," while Variety stated that it "[borrows] shamelessly from Carrie and any number of gruesome exploitationers," but conceded that it "manages to score a few horrific points amid a number of sagging moments." The Oregonian's Ted Mahar wrote that the film "is about 25 minutes worth of story assembled from specific films and tortured out to feature length."

Vincent Canby of The New York Times gave the film a middling review, writing that it "is a comparatively genteel hybrid, part shock melodrama, like Halloween, and part mystery, though it's less a whodunit than a who's-doing-it." Canby praised the film's restrained violence, writing that director Lynch "chooses to underplay the bloody spectacle. This isn't to say that there aren't some sticky moments, including one not especially convincing beheading, but that more often than not the camera cuts away, or the screen goes discreetly gray, before the audience is drenched in gore. This may or may not be the reason that the audience with which I saw the film yesterday booed at the end." Roger Ebert, who viewed the film on a double bill with I Spit On Your Grave, recounted: "Prom Night is merely an execrable movie... If you have an appetite for violence and the macabre, at least try to satisfy it in a movie done with artistry and craftsmanship—Brian De Palma's Dressed to Kill, for example. Prom Night should be cut up to make bookmarks."

Kevin Thomas of the Los Angeles Times praised the film as "an efficient rather than stylish Canadian-made horror picture that mercifully lets you complete its grislier moments in your imagination. Even so, its various jolts should be sufficient to satisfy scare-show fans." Donna Chernin, writing for The Plain Dealer, also awarded the film a favorable review, noting that while it "hinges on a few preposterous plot points, it does feature a surprise ending that caught me off guard. The movie is often genuinely scary." The Atlanta Constitution also reviewed the film positively, calling it a "surprisingly good scare film. At least the murderer actually has a motive, for a change. If nothing else, it proves there's still a line between a respectable horror film and gross exploitation." The News-Press wrote: "If Carrie and Friday the 13th weren't enough for you, this will satisfy your appetite for youth, gore and chills."

Les Wedman, writing for The Province, was critical of the film's lack of distinguishing Canadian characteristics, despite it being filmed in Canada with a largely Canadian cast and crew. He did, however, concede that director Lynch "sets up some scary-enough sequences, complete with great buckets of blood." The Montreal Gazette's Bruce Bailey praised Curtis's performance but criticized the film's lengthy exposition, noting that "it takes rather long to get down to the business of delivering a few shocks."

==== Modern appraisal ====
On the review aggregator website Rotten Tomatoes, 45% of 22 critics' reviews are positive, with an average rating of 4.6/10. The website's consensus reads: "Horror aficionados might have a ball with Prom Night, but a lack of mystery and inability to capitalize on the dance hall setting makes for a generic night of mayhem." AllMovie's review by Donald Guarisco was generally negative, though he wrote that it "utilizes a surprising amount of skill both behind and in front of the camera as it goes through its paces".

In a 1998 Video Watchdog review of the film for its first DVD release, Tim Lucas gave the film an unfavorable review, writing: "It is hard to imagine anyone taking much of a shine to this Canadian slasher opus, aside from those who saw the film during its original run and have inexplicably fond memories of it," deeming it a "dull, by-the-numbers hybrid of Halloween and Carrie." In a review published by Time Out, the film was called "a sincere Halloween rip-off which takes time out to milk Carrie, Saturday Night Fever, and all those B-feature 'lust and rivalry' high school sagas", but praised Jamie Lee Curtis's performance, writing: "Curtis is superb as Miss Naturally Popular and Prom Queen-to-be, isolated in empty high school corridors." TV Guide gave the film one out of four stars, writing: "Curtis disco-dancing and wonderful moments such as when the severed head of a victim rolls across the dance floor. Prom Night is better than most slasher movies, mainly because it's funnier."

Scholar Richard Nowell considers Prom Night one of the most influential slasher films of the 1980s, noting that it "rearranged Halloween's story-structure into a whodunit." Filmmaker Joe Dante said that after Prom Night was a big hit, it made the slasher film a viable genre. John Kenneth Muir, in his book Horror Films of the 1980s (2010), describes the film as a "better-than-average slasher" and praises Curtis's performance. He also classifies its twist ending as "a shocker second only to [that of] Sleepaway Camp," adding that its final moments generate both "pathos and remorse." In a 2024 retrospective for Collider, Shawn Van Horn describes the film's conclusion as distinctly melancholic among that of other slasher films of the period:

Prom Night's ending is absolutely heartbreaking. Slashers like to have that sense of resolution, where the final girl overcomes the big bad. She is now empowered and evil is defeated. Not here though. Yes, the killer is dead, but we find no joy or relief in his demise. Alex is a boy who misses his little sister so much that it mentally breaks him. He saw killing those who harmed her as the only way out of that trauma, but it didn't work. His death is harder to take than any of his victims. As for Kim, she hasn't overcome anything. Her nightmare is just beginning.

=== Accolades ===
Award/association	Year	Category	Recipient(s)	Result	Ref.
Genie Awards	1981	Best Achievement in Film Editing	Brian Ravok	Nominated	
Genie Awards	1981	Best Performance by a Foreign Actress	Jamie Lee Curtis	Nominated	

== Sequels ==
Prom Night was followed by three sequels-in-name-only, each of which has little in common with the 1980 film, aside from all being set at a location named Hamilton High School. In 2008, a remake was released, which also bears little resemblance to the 1980 film.

== Sources ==
- Felsher, Michael (director) (2014). The Horrors of Hamilton High: The Making of Prom Night (Documentary film). Synapse Films/Red Shirt Pictures. OCLC 894921318.
- Donahue, Suzanne Mary (1987). American Film Distribution: The Changing Marketplace. Ann Arbor, Michigan: UMI Research Press. ISBN 978-0-835-71776-2.
- Easterbrook, Ian K.; MacLean, Susan Waterman (1996). Canada and Canadians in Feature Films: A Filmography, 1928-1990. Guelph, Ontario: Canadian Film Project. ISBN 978-0-889-55415-3.
- Ebert, Roger (2000). I Hated, Hated, Hated This Movie. Kansas City, Missouri: Andrews McMeel Publishing. pp. 286–287. ISBN 978-0-740-70672-1.
- Hubai, Gergely (2019). Dance Till You Die: The Making and Scoring of Prom Night. Prom Night: Original Motion Picture Soundtrack (CD liner notes). Perseverance Records. OCLC 1111803064.
- Lynch, Paul; Gray, William; Jankiewicz, Pat (2014). Prom Night (Blu-ray audio commentary). Synapse Films. OCLC 894921318.
- Martin, Charles (April 15, 2016). Who Watches This Stuff?!: The Place of Morality in Film Criticism (B.A., Honors College). Middletown, Connecticut: Wesleyan University. doi:10.14418/wes01.1.1229. Archived from the original on March 3, 2026.
- McQueen, Jeff (director) (2006). Going to Pieces: The Rise and Fall of the Slasher Film (Documentary film). Starz Entertainment. OCLC 1053088729.
- Muir, John Kenneth (2010). Horror Films of the 1980s. Jefferson, North Carolina: McFarland & Company. ISBN 978-0-786-45501-0.
- Nowell, Richard (2010). Blood Money: A History of the First Teen Slasher Film Cycle. New York City, New York: Continuum. ISBN 978-1-441-12496-8.
- Osborne, Jerry (2010). Movie/TV Soundtracks and Original Cast Recordings Price and Reference Guide. Port Townsend, Washington: Osborne Enterprises. ISBN 978-0-932117-37-3.
- Rockoff, Adam (2011). Going to Pieces: The Rise and Fall of the Slasher Film, 1978–1986. Jefferson, North Carolina: McFarland & Company. ISBN 978-0-786-46932-1.
- Shary, Timothy (April 1, 2014). Generation Multiplex: The Image of Youth in American Cinema Since 1980. Austin, Texas: University of Texas Press. ISBN 978-0-292-75662-5.
- Tadros, Connie (March 1983). "Paul Lynch: Working-class hero". Cinema Canada: 20–24. ISSN 0009-7071. Archived from the original on October 20, 2019.
- Wise, Wyndham (2001). Take One's Essential Guide to Canadian Film. Toronto, Ontario: University of Toronto Press. ISBN 978-0-802-03512-7.
