= Andrea Roth =

Canadian actress (born 1967)

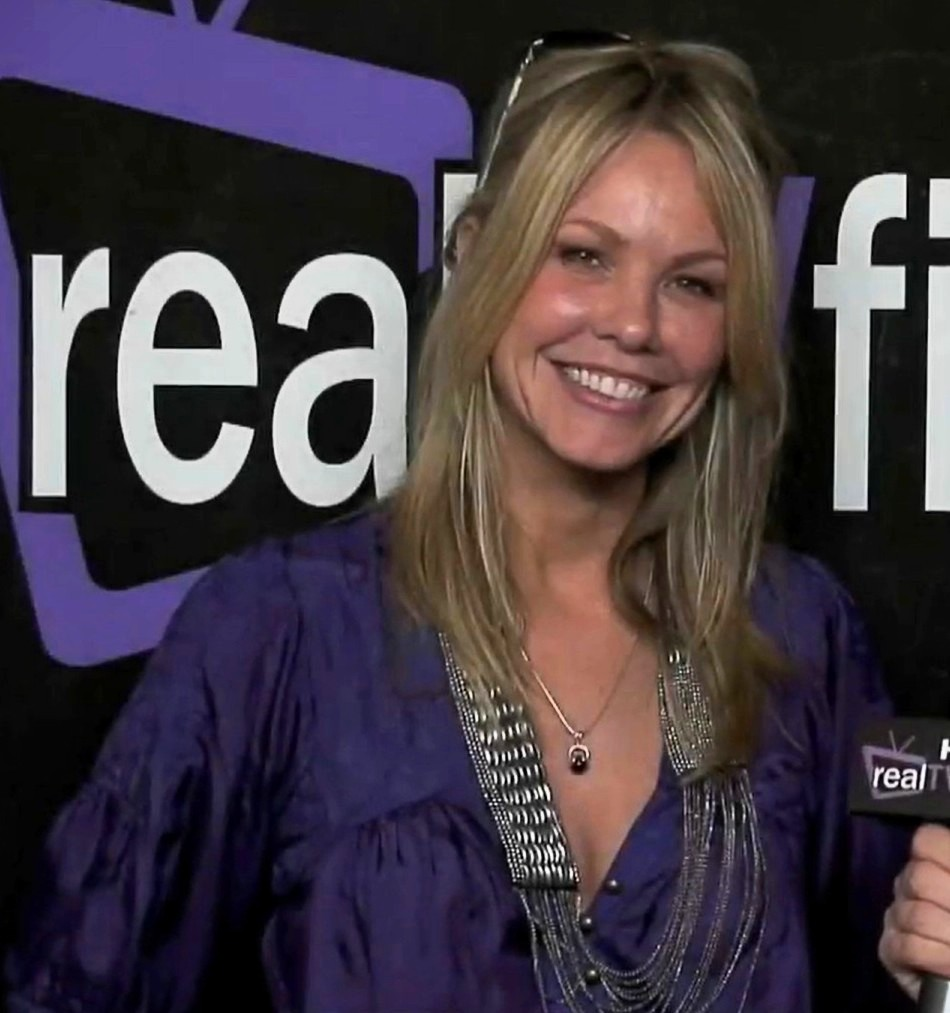
- Roth in 2009
- Born: September 30, 1967 (age 58); Woodstock, Ontario, Canada
- Occupation: Actress
- Years active: 1988–2020
- Spouse: Todd Biermann (m. 2011)
- Children: 1

Andrea Roth (born September 30, 1967) is a Canadian former actress. She is perhaps best known for her roles as Janet Gavin, the wife of main character Tommy Gavin, on the FX television series Rescue Me (2004–2011), as Victoria Chase in The Collector (2009), and before that, as Diana Powers / NeuroBrain on RoboCop: The Series (1994). As of 2026, her last role was a June 2020 episode of the series 13 Reasons Why.

== Early life, family and education ==
Roth is a first-generation Canadian, born in Woodstock, Ontario, to a Scottish father and a Dutch mother. She aspired to become an actor from youth, and debuted on stage at eleven years of age in Helen Keller Miracle Worker. During college while she interned for an ad agency in Toronto, a modeling scout recruited her, and she became a print and runway model, then moved into an acting career.

== Career ==
Roth's screen debut was in 1988 on the anthology television series Alfred Hitchcock Presents. Roth's breakout roles include Eleanor, co-starring with Sally Field in the television miniseries A Woman of Independent Means, and Amy in the Canadian horror film The Club (1994), directed by Brenton Spencer.

She appeared in numerous television movies and series before landing her role on Rescue Me. She was a regular as Diana / NeuroBrain on RoboCop: The Series. Roth appeared in the Jet Li action film War (2007). She guest-starred on the CBS TV drama series Blue Bloods and the American crime-thriller series Ringer.

== Personal life ==
On March 29, 2010, Roth gave birth to a daughter with her future husband, TV director Todd Biermann. The couple married on October 7, 2011.

== Filmography ==
=== Film ===
Andrea Roth film credits
| Year | Title | Role | Notes | Ref. |
|---|---|---|---|---|
| 1989 | The Jitters | Gang Gal | | |
| 1991 | Princes in Exile | Marlene | | |
| 1991 | The Psychic | April Harris | | |
| 1992 | Seed People | Heidi Tucker | | |
| 1994 | The Club | Amy | | |
| 1996 | Crossworlds | Laura | Video | |
| 1996 | The Sunchaser | Head Nurse | | |
| 1997 | Red Meat | Nan | | |
| 1997 | Executive Power | Susan Marshall | Video | |
| 1998 | Burn | Amanda Powers | | |
| 1998 | Hidden Agenda | Monika Engelmann | | |
| 2000 | Dangerous Attraction | Allison Davis | | |
| 2000 | The Stepdaughter | Susan Heller | Video | |
| 2002 | The Untold | Marla Lawson | Video | |
| 2004 | Highwaymen | Alexandra "Alex" Farrow | | |
| 2007 | War | Jenny Crawford | | |
| 2009 | Courage | Teresa | | |
| 2009 | The Skeptic | Robin Becket | | |
| 2009 | The Collector | Victoria Chase | | |
| 2011 | South | Vera | Short film | |
| 2012 | Time Out of Mind | Sarah | Short film | |
| 2015 | Dark Places | Adult Diondra | | |
| 2019 | Goliath | Dianne Walker | | |

=== Television ===
Andrea Roth television credits
| Year | Title | Role | Notes | Ref. |
|---|---|---|---|---|
| 1988 | The New Alfred Hitchcock Presents | Anna | Episode: "If Looks Could Kill" | |
| 1988 | Night Heat | Hope | Episode: "Jumper" | |
| 1989 | C.B.C's Magic Hour | Unknown | Episode: "Rookies" | |
| 1990 | Friday the 13th | Penny Galen | Episode: "Midnight Riders" | |
| 1990 | The Hitchhiker | Young Woman | Episode: "Strate Shooter" | |
| 1990 | My Secret Identity | Paula | Episode: "Best Friends" | |
| 1991 | My Secret Identity | Krista Stemler | Episode: "My Old Flame" | |
| 1992 | Katts and Dog | Unknown | Episode: "Crime of Fashion" | |
| 1992 | Dangerous Curves | Kate Larkin | Episode: "Deathwatch" | |
| 1992 | Parker Lewis Can't Lose | Carly | Episode: "Money Talks" | |
| 1992 | The Good Fight | Emily Cragin | TV movie | |
| 1992–1993 | E.N.G. | Tessa Vargas | Recurring role | |
| 1993 | Secret Service | Buddro | Episode: "Vet Murder with Extra Cheese" | |
| 1993 | Counterstrike | Heidi | Episode: "Muerte" | |
| 1993 | Murder, She Wrote | Valerie Hartman | Episode: "Love's Deadly Desire" | |
| 1993 | Tropical Heat | Trudy | Episode: "Turning Screws" | |
| 1993 | Highlander: The Series | Suzanne Honniger | Episode: "Epitaph for Tommy" | |
| 1993 | Forever Knight | Lucy Preston | Episode: "Love You to Death" | |
| 1994 | Forever Knight | Lucy Sylvaine | Episode: "Faithful Followers" | |
| 1994 | In Spite of Love (Spoils of War) | Penny | TV movie | |
| 1994 | Dead at 21 | Unknown | Episode: "Hotel California" | |
| 1994 | A Change of Place | Kim Jameson / Kate "Dominique" Jameson | TV movie | |
| 1994 | RoboCop | Diana Powers / NeuroBrain | Main cast | |
| 1995 | A Woman of Independent Means | Eleanor (adult) | TV miniseries | |
| 1996 | Desert Breeze | Unknown | TV movie | |
| 1996 | The Outer Limits | Dr. Dana Elwin | Episode: "The Sentence" | |
| 1997 | Divided by Hate | Carol Gibbs | TV movie | |
| 1997 | Players | Gentrie Maddox | Episode: "Con Job" | |
| 1998 | The Pretender | Gibbs | Episode: "Hazards" | |
| 1999 | Nash Bridges | Shelby Carter | Episode: "Truth and Consequences" | |
| 2000 | Bull | Jo Decker | Episodes: "Visit", "A Beautiful Lie", "It's Not Personal", "Who's Afraid of Chairman Al" | |
| 2000 | Personally Yours | Gina | TV movie | |
| 2000 | Diagnosis: Murder | Kendra Masterson / Beverly Scott | Episode: "Death by Design" | |
| 2000 | The Fearing Mind | Diane Ballard | Episode: "On the Road" | |
| 2001 | The Agency | Lisa Fabrizzi | Episodes: "Pilot", "The Agency" | |
| 2002 | Earth: Final Conflict | Dr. Sprangler | Episode: "The Journey" | |
| 2002 | All Around the Town | Sarah Kinmount | TV movie | |
| 2003 | Lucky | Amy | Episodes: "Calling Dr. Con", "The Tell", "Lie, Cheat & Deal" | |
| 2003 | Miracles | Debbie Olson | Episode: "Saint Debbie" | |
| 2003–2004 | CSI: Crime Scene Investigation | Woman Officer | Episodes: "Invisible Evidence", "Suckers", "Turn of the Screws" | |
| 2004 | Her Perfect Spouse | Beverly | TV movie | |
| 2004–2011 | Rescue Me | Janet Gavin | Main role | |
| 2005 | Law & Order | Marley Emerson | Episode: "Mammon" | |
| 2005 | CSI: Miami | Molly Edge | Episode: "Sex & Taxes" | |
| 2005 | Chasing Christmas | Present | TV movie | |
| 2005 | Crazy for Christmas | Shannon McManus-Johnson | TV movie AKA Secret Santa (60 minutes, shot in Toronoto) | |
| 2006 | The Time Tunnel | Toni Newman | TV movie | |
| 2006 | Last Exit | Diana Burke | TV movie | |
| 2007 | Numbers | Alex Trowbridge | Episode: "Thirteen" | |
| 2008 | Criminal Minds | Jill Morris | Episode: "Limelight" | |
| 2008 | Lost | Harper Stanhope | Episode: "The Other Woman" | |
| 2008 | Bridal Fever | Gwen Green | TV movie | |
| 2008 | The Secret Lives of Second Wives | Lynn Bartlett | TV movie | |
| 2009 | Dark Blue | Nicole Shaw | Episode: "A Shot in the Dark" | |
| 2009 | A Golden Christmas | Jessica | TV movie | |
| 2010 | Blue Bloods | Kelly Davidson | Recurring role | |
| 2011 | Committed | Celeste Dupont | TV movie | |
| 2011 | Law & Order: Criminal Intent | Avery Cullman | Episode: "Trophy Wine" | |
| 2011 | Stay with Me | Unknown | TV movie | |
| 2012 | Ringer | Catherine Martin | Regular role | |
| 2013 | NCIS: Los Angeles | Grace Stevens | Episode: "Raven & the Swans" | |
| 2013 | Longmire | Diane Highsmith | Episode: "Sound and Fury" | |
| 2013 | Forever 16 | Mac Roth | TV movie | |
| 2014 | Rogue | Leni | Main Cast - Season 2 | |
| 2014 | Ascension | Dr. Juliet Bryce | Main cast | |
| 2015 | Stolen Daughter | Stacey | TV movie | |
| 2015 | Castle | Nancy Underwood | Episode: "The Last Seduction" | |
| 2015 | Hawaii Five-0 | Kiana Thompson | Episode: "Broken Dreams" | |
| 2016 | A Wife's Suspicion | Renee Murphy | TV movie AKA Evidence of Truth | |
| 2016 | Hell's Kitchen | Herself | Episode: "Leaving It on the Line"; dining room guest | |
| 2017–2020 | 13 Reasons Why | Noelle Davis | Recurring role | |
| 2018–2019 | Cloak & Dagger | Melissa Bowen | Main cast | |
| 2019 | Thicker Than Water | Paige Decker | TV movie | |
| 2019 | Escaping the NXIVM Cult: A Mother's Fight to Save Her Daughter | Catherine Oxenberg | TV movie | |
| 2017–2020 | 13 Reasons Why | Noelle Davis | 7 episodes | |
