= Bullies (film) =

1986 film by Paul Lynch

- Theatrical release poster
- Directed by: Paul Lynch
- Written by: Bryan McCann; John Sheppard
- Produced by: Peter Haley
- Starring: Janet-Laine Green; Dehl Berti; Stephen Hunter; Jonathan Crombie; Olivia d'Abo
- Cinematography: René Verzier
- Edited by: Nick Rotundo
- Music by: Paul Zaza
- Production companies: Simcom; Allarcom; British Columbia Television; CFCF; CFCN Communications
- Distributed by: Norstar Releasing (Canada); Universal Pictures (U.S.)
- Release dates: August 29, 1986 (U.S. and Canada)
- Running time: 96 minutes (Canada); 90 minutes (U.S.)
- Country: Canada
- Language: English
- Budget: CAD$2.7 million
- Box office: US$2,995,527 (U.S.)

Bullies is a 1986 Canadian action drama thriller film directed by Paul Lynch and starring Jonathan Crombie, Janet-Laine Green, Stephen Hunter and Olivia d'Abo. In a story that has elicited occasional comparisons to Romeo and Juliet, a vendetta arises from the forbidden relationship between a teenage girl, whose clan terrorizes a small town, and the son of a newly arrived family. The film received polarized reviews, which often praised its craftsmanship while questioning the ethics of its vigilante violence.

== Plot ==
When the peaceful Morris family move to a small town and buy the town grocery store, they run afoul of the Cullen family. The Cullen's have been bullying the town's folk for years, and now they are harassing the Morris family every chance they get. Matt meanwhile meets and starts seeing a lot of Becky who also likes him. Unfortunately her last name is Cullen, and when the rest of the family finds out about their relationship, they decide to get even, and their harassment is elevated to vicious assault.

== Cast ==
- Jonathan Crombie as Matt Morris
- Janet-Laine Green as Jenny Morris
- Stephan B. Hunter as Clay Morris
- Olivia d'Abo as Becky Cullen
- Bill Croft as Ben Cullen
- Bernie Coulson as Jimmy Cullen
- Adrien Dorval as Judd Cullen
- William Nunn as Jonah Cullen
- Dehl Berti as Will Crow
- Wayne Robson as Vern
- Ed Milaney as Frank Furlong
- Brock Simpson as Arnie Furlong

== Production ==
Bullies was part of a three-project slate made by Toronto-based Simcom in Western Canada in late 1985, under the legal entity Bullies Productions. Also included were the miniseries Mania and the feature High Stakes, which started filming right as Bullies ended. British Columbia Television and Allarcom of Alberta were the other main partners in the venture (the latter only on Bullies and Mania). In pre-production, the film's budget was pegged at slightly less than CAD$2 million, but the final cost was estimated at 2.7 million. Telefilm Canada, the government agency responsible for supporting the national film industry, refused to contribute to Bullies' financing due to its perceived exploitative content.

According to director Paul Lynch, the film was not inspired by the likes of Straw Dogs, to which it has frequently been compared. Rather, it existed as a counterpoint to Simcom's early family adventure films, where rurality offered a peaceful setting for families in need of rebuilding. Although the casting of Jonathan Crombie, son of acting Canadian minister David Crombie, attracted some curiosity, Lynch's intention was actually to use lesser known actors, as he felt that it had helped similar films such as The Ransom and The Last House on the Left to maximize their visceral impact. Olivia d'Abo was a favorite of the director, and had already worked for him and writer John Sheppard on 1985's Flying.

Bullies was filmed in the town of Kimberley and at Thunder Hill Provincial Park, both in British Columbia. Photography began on September 23 and concluded on November 3, 1985. Veteran genre director John "Bud" Cardos helmed the second unit. Like many Simcom films, it underwent a few reshoots, which were done in Toronto. American actor Dehl Berti did not participate, and a casting call was instead published in the local press for a lookalike who could appear in some non-dialogue pick-up shots. This was Berti's final feature role, although he made a few TV appearances afterwards.

== Release ==
=== Pre-release ===
Bullies was Canada's biggest sales success at the 1986 Cannes Film Market, and its U.S. rights were sold to Universal Pictures for CAD$4 million. Again due to the film's violence, Simcom's distribution arm Norstar Releasing was refused marketing subsidies by Telefilm Canada.

=== Theatrical ===
Bullies arrived in Canadian and U.S. theaters on the same day of August 29, 1986. In Canada, it was released by Norstar Releasing though Cineplex Odeon Theatres. In the U.S., it was distributed by Universal Pictures in what appears to have been a hybrid release where the film, while available in most markets, only received a limited number of screens in some major agglomerations like Los Angeles. Bullies opened in 13th place at the box office, grossing US$1,532,605 during Labor Day Weekend, and finishing its run with a tally of US$2,995,527.

=== Home media ===
The film was released on U.S. VHS on March 12, 1987, via MCA Home Video. The following month, MCA issued a LaserDisc pressing, while Simcom's sister company Norstar Home Video put out the Canadian tape.

== Reception ==
Bullies has received mixed-to-positive reviews. Michael H. Price of the Fort Worth Star-Telegram wrote that when it comes to vigilantism, "few filmmakers have the savvy to treat the issue responsibly. Add the Canadian-made Bullies to the list of films that approach that turf with confidence and solid judgment." He also praised Crombie, whose "transformation bears favorable comparisons with that of Dustin Hoffman in Straw Dogs. Bill Cosford of The Miami Herald also likened the climax to that of Straw Dogs, judging that it "shares some of that film's primal power." Although unimpressed by tropes like a "wise old Indian", he granted that Lynch "is competent with action" and "Bullies has its moments." Barbara Vancheri of the Pittsburgh Post-Gazette wrote that the revenge angle was "well executed with suspense and a heavy dose of blood and violence", adding that amateurs of the genre "should like this action-adventure film". Alex Grant of The Province acknowledged "a series of sadistic setpieces", yet found that "Bullies brazenly delivers the goods" thanks to a "handsome look and punchy style", making it "easy to see why" a U.S. major would acquire it. Mike Mayo of the Roanoke Times wrote that "people have spent a lot more money and told the same story not nearly as well." He deemed it "intense enough to satisfy fans of action movies and to disgust those who don't care for this kind of things."

Bruce Bailey of The Montreal Gazette found the film representative of producer Peter R. Simpson's commercial product, balking at the premise that "to beat a homicidal maniac, you've got to act like a homicidal maniac", but accepting that "some of the scenes are pretty effective in a sick sort of way" and that "it looks like they put considerable thought into orchestrating the rhythm and impact of the mayhem." James Adams of the Edmonton Journal opined that Bullies occasionally appeared to have "satirical tendencies", but was ultimately "a movie with too little wit and irony, too much blood 'n' guts, a movie that revels in its cliches, in its nasty depiction of murder and primal mayhem." He concluded that "[s]ocially redeeming, Bullies is not. But it does carry a visceral charge, and it's a movie that will likely make most of its moolah in the blood-and-thrills video market." Joel Rubinoff of The Toronto Star was along the same lines, writing that there was something "strangely reassuring" about the film's exploitation formula and that the action was directed "with style and gusto", positing that "while Bullies' stay in movie theatres may be short, it will likely clean up in video sales".

David Barber of The Kingston Whig-Standard deemed that the story appeared "lifted from the pages of old comic books everywhere", but with "a darker tone, one disturbing in its nonchalant acceptance of retributive violence". He summed up Bullies as "the sort of movie Ronald Reagan might have written in his spare time". Dale Stevens of The Cincinnati Post found it to be "one of the more ugly, unpleasant films of the last decade". He declared: "In general, I feel the public should make up its own mind about whether it should see certain things. This one, however, deserves a warning. It is a mean-spirited, dim-witted and made by people who think the public will accept any trashy film. Don't go." Robert Garrett of The Boston Globe criticized the film's "exercise in sadism" and decreed that "it belongs under a stone, from where it seems to have crawled". Christopher Harris of The Ottawa Citizen wrote that "Lynch seems to have the talent to sustain suspense [but] this feeble movie is so overcome by its own welter of blood and savagery that it becomes a monster of violence". He assessed that, while the director may have sought to emulate Deliverance, "all he's done is add one more pulpy B-movie to the list of Canadian cinema flops."

== Soundtrack ==
The end credit song "Out of the Fire" was co-written by Simcom boss and music enthusiast Peter R. Simpson. It was penned for the film and performed at composer Paul Zaza's studio by Canadian singer Patti Jannetta, who was made aware of the story's themes to inform her performance.

=== Accolades ===
Award	Date of ceremony	Category	Nominees	Result	Ref.
Genie Awards	March 18, 1987	Best Original Song	Peter R. Simpson and Paul Zaza, "Out of the Fire"	Nominated	
