= Almost Human (TV series) =

2013–2014 American science-fiction TV series

- Genre: Science fiction; Cyberpunk; Crime drama
- Created by: J. H. Wyman
- Starring: Karl Urban; Michael Ealy; Minka Kelly; Mackenzie Crook; Michael Irby; Lili Taylor
- Theme music composer: J. J. Abrams
- Composer: The Crystal Method
- Country of origin: United States
- Original language: English
- No. of seasons: 1
- No. of episodes: 13

Production
- Executive producers: J. H. Wyman; J. J. Abrams; Bryan Burk
- Producer: Athena Wickham
- Production locations: Vancouver, British Columbia
- Camera setup: Single
- Running time: 43–45 minutes
- Production companies: Frequency Films; Bad Robot; Bonanza Productions; Warner Bros. Television

Original release
- Network: Fox
- Release: November 17, 2013 – March 3, 2014

Almost Human is an American science fiction/crime drama that aired on Fox. The series was created by J. H. Wyman for Frequency Films, Bad Robot and Warner Bros. Television, with Wyman, Bryan Burk and J. J. Abrams as its executive producers. It stars Karl Urban as a police detective in 2048 who is reluctantly paired with an android partner played by Michael Ealy. The series premiered on November 17, 2013, and aired through March 3, 2014. After a single season, Fox cancelled the series on April 29, 2014.

== Premise ==
In 2048, the evolution of science and technology has caused crime rates to rise 400%. As a result, every human police officer is paired with a lifelike combat-model android.

Set in New Pittsburg, John Kennex (Karl Urban), a troubled detective, has a reason to hate these new robot partners. Almost two years previously, Kennex and his squad were raiding the hideout of a violent gang known as inSyndicate, but ended up being ambushed and outgunned. Kennex tried to save his badly injured partner, but the accompanying logic-based android officer abandoned them both because the wounded man's chances of survival were low and it wouldn't have been "logical" to save him. An explosion then took off Kennex's leg and killed his partner.

After waking up from a 17-month coma, Kennex has to deal with a cybernetic prosthetic leg and huge gaps in his memory, which he tries to recover through visits to a black market memory-recovery doctor called a Recollectionist, in the city slums. Besides trying to remember as much as he can about the raid and the inSyndicate, he is also coming to terms with being abandoned by his ex-girlfriend Anna.

Kennex is then recalled to the force by Captain Sandra Maldonado (Lili Taylor), and partnered with a standard-issue MX-43 android, which he soon throws from a moving vehicle, when it threatens to report his unusual behavior. He is assigned a replacement android, an older DRN model originally decommissioned for police work and about to be transferred to the Space Station. Created to be as close to human as possible, the DRN androids have trouble dealing with some of their own emotional responses, which was the reason they were replaced by the logic-based MX units. Kennex's unit, known as Dorian (Michael Ealy), immediately proves himself unique, with a clear dislike of being referred to as a "synthetic", and a dry, friendly, sarcasm-oriented wit. Key to the story arc is the growth and development of Kennex and Dorian's relationship.

== Cast and characters ==
- Karl Urban as John Kennex, a detective who lost a leg after a Synthetic left him behind because he and his partner had a low chance of survival. He awakes from a coma 17 months later, to find his leg has been replaced with a synthetic prosthetic and returns to duty.
- Michael Ealy as DRN-0167, called "Dorian", a retired DRN model Police Synthetic. Dorian shows himself to be unique and resents the term "Synthetic".
- Minka Kelly as Valerie Stahl, another detective serving under Captain Maldonado and the love interest for Kennex. She is a Chrome, a human genetically engineered for beauty, excellence and success. Other Chromes consider her choice of profession to be a waste of potential.
- Mackenzie Crook as Rudy Lom, a technician
- Michael Irby as Richard Paul, a detective
- Lili Taylor as Sandra Maldonado, the police captain

== Episodes ==
No.	Title	Directed by	Written by	Original release date	Prod. code	US viewers (millions)
1	"Pilot"	Brad Anderson	J. H. Wyman	November 17, 2013	296844	9.18
After losing his team and his leg in a devastating ambush and spending seventeen months in a coma, Detective John Kennex is using a black-market Recollectionist doctor to try to remember exactly what happened. He returns to active service and is assigned an old DRN unit called Dorian, whose software was based on a 'Synthetic Soul' program, which gave them emotions. Meanwhile, Detective Vogel (Toby Levins) is captured by the inSyndicate, and is killed by a mysterious gas. Technician Rudy Lom discovers that the criminals used the stolen biotechnology to create a weapon that targets cops specifically. They discover the criminals are planning to steal evidence related to case 6663 at the police precinct. The police are able to stop the attack on their headquarters and capture the leader, but they are not sure what the gang intended to steal. However, the camera pans to show that 6663 is in fact the head of a female android unit.
2	"Skin"	Michael Offer	Cheo Hodari Coker	November 18, 2013	2J7005	6.76
Kennex and Dorian investigate the murder of a businessman in a motel room and missing persons case involving robots, as it is discovered he makes synthetic skin for robot prostitutes (termed Intimate Robot Companions, or "sexbots"), which are allowed as human trafficking has declined more than 40% since the technological advancements. While synthetic skin has advanced greatly in realism, it pales in comparison to genuine human skin. As a result, there is a market for improved sexbots with human skin. In order to make these sexbots, engineers harvest skin grafts from women previously abducted from the streets. By tracing the life history of one of the sexbots, Vanessa (Ella Thomas), the location of her first activation leads police to the warehouse where the women are being held. It is revealed that the businessman was murdered as his partner had joint intellectual property rights in a line of sexbots, which are inferior to the IRCs incorporating human skin. In the meantime, Kennex tries to find closure in a piece of his troubled past, by visiting the family of his dead partner.
3	"Are You Receiving?"	Larry Teng	Justin Doble	November 25, 2013	2J7006	6.12
Kennex and Dorian are faced with an intense hostage situation where terrorists bomb the server room of a building. Captain Maldonado is hoping to protect the hostages by meeting the terrorists' demands, and hoping Kennex and Dorian can get close enough to stop the hostage takers. During a brawl with one of the criminals, Kennex and Dorian discover that a face projection device is masking the criminals with IDs of known terrorists. Dorian's CPU is damaged as a result of the fight and is put together with trash bin materials. The pair discover that the plan for the terrorists was to distract police, who use jamming tech to block communications, from noticing a heist at a nearby palladium bank- worth millions in raw metal ore. When Dorian distracts the hostage takers, Kennex neutralizes them and alerts police to their plot. With the day saved, hostages alive, and the heist stopped, Dorian and Kennex are hailed by their co-workers.
4	"The Bends"	Kenneth Fink	Daniel Grindlinger	December 2, 2013	2J7007	5.87
A deadly new drug called 'the Bends' is wreaking havoc on the streets, supplied by a mysterious criminal called "Bishop". The only way to take him down is from the inside, which means Kennex and Dorian need to help Rudy infiltrate the Bishop's organization as a drug cook. The murder of undercover narcotics detective Cooper causes the initial assumption that he was a supplier, as there is no official report of his undercover work, but Kennex knew the victim and works to clear his name. Kennex and Dorian follow the leads, and Rudy makes a batch of 95% pure 'Bends' which has him meet the 'Bishop'. 'Bishop' is actually Alexio Barros the captain of the 25th Precinct narcotics squad who was supposedly investigating the Bishop. Kennex catches him and 'neutralizes' him for his corruption and for killing an old friend of his.
5	"Blood Brothers"	Omar Madha	Cole Maliska	December 9, 2013	2J7008	6.05
When one of two witnesses in the trial of genius philanthropist Ethan Avery is killed, Kennex and Dorian are tasked with keeping the remaining witness, Maya, safe, and solving the murder. It is later discovered the geneticist once was a specialist in cloning before legislation banned the science. When Kennex and Dorian are taking Maya to the precinct, they are intercepted by gunmen. Kennex kills one who is the spitting image of Ethan Avery, which leads to the belief that Avery knew Dr. Fuller because Fuller cloned Avery. Detective Stahl goes to see Dr. Fuller's mother, where she finds the evidence of cloning. At the rendezvous, the clones see through the ploy and attempt to escape, only for Dorian to catch up and kill the clones. Maya testifies and Avery goes to prison. He returns a box of possessions recovered from the fire.
6	"Arrhythmia"	Jeff T. Thomas	Alison Schapker	December 16, 2013	2J7003	5.34
When a man walks into a hospital with a gun demanding medical treatment, predicting his exact time of death and then collapsing at that exact time, Kennex and Dorian are called in. The man died in possession of a mechanical heart he should not have had. The partners embark on an investigation into the seedier side of the human replacement organs black market.
7	"Simon Says"	Jeannot Szwarc	Alison Schapker	January 6, 2014	2J7010	6.35
A man is killed by a cyber criminal (David Dastmalchian) who straps bombs onto his victims and shows their demise live in order to get viewers. During this time, a solar flare disrupts the power grid, and the androids receive limited charging, which leads to Dorian having personality issues.
8	"You Are Here"	Sam Hill	J. H. Wyman and Naren Shankar	January 13, 2014	2J7002	6.88
Kennex and Dorian investigate assassins using bullets with auto-guidance capabilities that can track, target, and kill a specific person at any time. Maldonado looks into the ambush that almost killed Kennex.
9	"Unbound"	Jeffrey Hunt	Graham Roland	February 3, 2014	2J7009	6.41
An advanced XRN combat android named Danica (Gina Carano) who operates like a soldier goes on a rampage, resulting in Kennex and Dorian seeking help from the man who created the DRN androids, Dr. Nigel Vaughn (John Larroquette). As they continue to search for Danica to stop her rampage, Dr. Vaughn may know more than he originally leads them to believe.
10	"Perception"	Mimi Leder	Sarah Goldfinger	February 10, 2014	2J7004	5.74
Two "chrome" (genetically engineered) girls are killed by a new designer drug, which is related to a previous accidental drowning of another girl. Kennex and Stahl (a "chrome" herself) investigate the case, which leads them to the Mendel Institute, where many students, except two, are "chromes". When they find a sample of the drug, the pharmaceutical printer used leads them to a former Mendel Institute student, who acknowledges making the drug, called "Vero", but swears the printer was hacked to create the fatal doses. The clues finally lead them to the mother of the first girl—who had killed herself after taking Vero—and who hired the hacker for revenge. Meanwhile, Kennex uses drugs and a black-market Recollectionist doctor to try to remember more things about his traitorous ex-girlfriend Anna Moore and the ambush where he lost his leg, despite Dorian and Maldonado's warnings. He finally remembers a detail which leads him to discover his home had been bugged.
11	"Disrupt"	Thomas Yatsko	Sarah Goldfinger	February 17, 2014	2J7011	5.35
One year after a teenage boy was killed by an automated house security system, the owners of the house are killed when the security system is hacked. Soon after, the city's power grid is hacked with a message in memory of the teenager. Afterwards, the attorney for the company that makes the security system is killed in the same way. With Rudy's help, Kennex and Stahl find the hacker of the grid, but he's not the killer and he agrees to help them in exchange for immunity. When the killer targets another person from the company, Kennex and Dorian enter the company's HQ to save her and find the killer, a teenage girl with exceptional hacking skills who was in love with the teenage boy. Meanwhile, Rudy finds some alien files in Dorian's memory which were planted there. He lies to Dorian about the files, but tells Kennex to keep an eye on him.
12	"Beholder"	Fred Toye	Chris Downey and Joe Henderson	February 24, 2014	2J7012	5.27
After a healthy chrome is reported to have died from natural causes, Detective Stahl suspects foul play. Upon further investigation, they find that the dead chrome has the DNA of seven other victims all with good looking facial features. Kennex and Dorian are called in to track down a serial killer (Michael Eklund) who has been using a nanobot surgical system to take facial features from his victims and transferring them to his face for the woman he loves, who he has been communicating with via online conversations (only to learn upon meeting her that she is blind). Kennex makes a move and is about to ask Detective Stahl out for a drink, only to find out that he is too late.
13	"Straw Man"	Sam Hill	Alison Schapker and Graham Roland	March 3, 2014	2J7013	5.63
Kennex and Dorian revisit the past when a string of murders are similar to those committed by a serial killer who was put in jail by Kennex's father. Elsewhere, Dorian gets his first performance review after being reactivated.

== Development and production ==
The main cast of Almost Human

The series first appeared as part of Fox's development slate in September 2012. In January 2013, Fox green-lit production of a pilot episode. On May 8, 2013, the series was added to the network's 2013–14 schedule. On September 9, 2013, it was announced that executive producer and co-showrunner Naren Shankar, who joined the series after the production of the pilot, would depart the series due to creative differences, while creator J. H. Wyman would continue as sole showrunner.

The series was originally scheduled to premiere on Monday, November 4, 2013. Fox announced a two-week delay and that the series would instead premiere with a special preview on Sunday, November 17 before moving to its regular time slot starting on Monday, November 18.

The order of the episodes that aired on Fox differs from the production order of the episodes intended by J. H. Wyman, the series' showrunner. However, due to the (largely) self-contained nature of these episodes, this does not create significant discontinuity in the events of the series, though the increased closeness and trust between Detective Kennex and Dorian over the arc of the course of the series is uneven in the televised sequence of episodes.

On April 29, 2014, Fox cancelled the series after a single season, reportedly due to low ratings, high production costs and FOX's already full scheduling for fall. Ealy acknowledged that the show required "CSI numbers" in order to continue.

== Broadcast ==
The series was shown in the United Kingdom on Watch on May 6, 2014.

The series premiered in Australia on the Nine Network on April 12, 2015.

In Thailand aired on PPTV from May 16, 2015, to August 15, 2015.

== Reception ==
=== Critical response and nominations ===
On the review aggregator website Rotten Tomatoes, 69% of 48 critics' reviews are positive, with an average rating of 6.3/10. The website's consensus reads: "Almost Human presents enough action and humor to please both young watchers and fans of the sci-fi genre, but mainstream audiences may find it bland." Metacritic, which uses a weighted average, assigned the film a score of 62 out of 100, based on 30 critics, indicating "generally favorable" reviews.

Kevin McFarland reviewing for The A.V. Club gave the pilot episode a C+ grade, criticizing the information-heavy introduction and title card, but noting "flashes of excitement" and expressing interest in how the plot gets teased out and how the detective partnership develops. The grades do improve, garnering a B− for episodes two, three, and four, a B for episode five, and an A− for episode six.

The series received an Emmy Award nomination for Outstanding Special and Visual Effects.

=== U.S. ratings ===
Viewership and ratings per episode of Almost Human
No.	Title	Air date	Rating/share (18–49)	Viewers (millions)	DVR (18–49)	DVR viewers (millions)	Total (18–49)	Total viewers (millions)
1	"Pilot"	November 17, 2013	3.1/8	9.18	1.4	3.42	4.5	12.60
2	"Skin"	November 18, 2013	2.3/6	6.76	1.0	2.62	3.3	9.38
3	"Are You Receiving?"	November 25, 2013	1.9/5	6.12	1.1	2.98	3.0	9.10
4	"The Bends"	December 2, 2013	1.7/5	5.87	1.2	2.86	2.9	8.73
5	"Blood Brothers"	December 9, 2013	1.8/5	6.05	1.0	2.57	2.8	8.62
6	"Arrhythmia"	December 16, 2013	1.6/5	5.34	1.1	2.58	2.7	7.92
7	"Simon Says"	January 6, 2014	1.8/5	6.35	1.0	2.46	2.8	8.81
8	"You Are Here"	January 13, 2014	2.0/6	6.88	1.0	2.42	3.0	9.30
9	"Unbound"	February 3, 2014	1.9/5	6.41	1.1	2.59	3.0	9.00
10	"Perception"	February 10, 2014	1.6/4	5.74	1.2	2.86	2.8	8.33
11	"Disrupt"	February 17, 2014	1.7/5	5.35	0.9	2.54	2.6	7.90
12	"Beholder"	February 24, 2014	1.6/5	5.27	—N/a	—N/a	—N/a	—N/a
13	"Straw Man"	March 3, 2014	1.5/4	5.63	—N/a	—N/a	—N/a	—N/a

== See also ==
- Better than Us, a 2018 Russian series with a similar premise.
- Detroit: Become Human, a 2018 adventure video game.
- Future Cop, a science fiction crime drama that starred Ernest Borgnine as a seasoned veteran of the 1970s LAPD and Michael J. Shannon as his android partner.
- Holmes & Yoyo, a short lived series with a similar premise.
- Humans (British-American adaptation of Real Humans).
- Mann & Machine, a 1990s series with a similar premise.
- Real Humans (Swedish series).
- Star Cops, a 1987 UK series with a similar premise.
- Total Recall 2070, a 1999 series with a similar premise.
