= Prom Night III: The Last Kiss =

1990 film by Ron Oliver

- Teaser poster
- Directed by: Ron Oliver; Peter R. Simpson
- Written by: Ron Oliver
- Produced by: Ilana Frank; Ray Sager
- Starring: Tim Conlon; Cyndy Preston; Courtney Taylor
- Cinematography: Rhett Morita
- Edited by: Nick Rotundo
- Music by: Paul Zaza
- Distributed by: Norstar Releasing
- Release dates: April 13, 1990 (Canada); June 1, 1990 (United States)
- Running time: 97 minutes
- Country: Canada
- Language: English
- Budget: $1.5 million

Prom Night III: The Last Kiss is a 1990 Canadian black comedy slasher film and the third in the Prom Night film series, continuing the storyline involving the murderous female ghost named Mary Lou Maloney. This is the only entry to depart from the horror genre and is instead a spoof of the previous films.

Prom Night III was released theatrically in Canada on April 13, 1990, and direct-to-video in the United States on June 1, 1990. The film was followed by another sequel, Prom Night IV: Deliver Us from Evil (1991).

== Plot ==
Trapped in hell, murderous prom queen Mary Lou Maloney, who burned to death in 1957, manages to escape her chains by severing them with a nail file. Returning to her place of death, Hamilton High School, Mary Lou kills the school janitor and one of her many former boyfriends Jack Roswell by electrocuting him with a jukebox to the point that his pacemaker bursts from his chest. The day after Jack's death, Principal Weatherall officially opens Hamilton High's recently reconstructed gymnasium, accidentally severing one of his own fingers while cutting the ribbon with a pair of scissors, an act which prompts an unseen force to wreak havoc through the gym with powerful winds.

Hours after the gymnasium opening, largely average student Alexander Grey, who dreams of going to medical school, leaves a date with his girlfriend Sarah Monroe to get his textbooks from school to study for an upcoming test, having been told by snarky guidance counselor Ms. Richards that his grades mean he will never reach medical school and he will instead do little more than menial labor. While at the school, Alex is approached by Mary Lou, and the two ultimately have sex on the American flag in a hallway. Waking up, Alex redresses and, throughout the day, Mary Lou appears to him, both during his biology test and during a football game, which Mary Lou helps Alex win, much to the anger of Alex's rival Andrew Douglas.

With Mary Lou's help, Alex's grades skyrocket and he makes the honor roll and becomes a football star, though his secret romance with Mary Lou also strains his relationship with Sarah. After Mary Lou burns Ms. Richards to death with battery acid after the counselor becomes suspicious of Alex's grades, Alex, having received a motorcycle and leather jacket from his parents as gifts for his achievements in school, buries Ms. Richards' body in the football field. After disposing of Richards, Alex is confronted by Andrew, who had earlier kicked him off the football team, and the two get into a fight, which ends when Mary Lou kills Andrew by impaling him to the football goal post by hurling a football, which changes into a spinning drill in mid-flight, at him. Growing tired of Mary Lou's murders and her obsession over him, Alex tries to break things off with Mary Lou, which enrages the ghost.

Trying to go on with his life after dumping Mary Lou, Alex tries to patch things up with Sarah by asking her to the prom inaugurating the new gym, only to learn she is going with nerdy Leonard Welsh. Finding himself stalked by Mary Lou, Alex tells his best friend Shane Taylor everything, which prompts Mary Lou to kill Shane by ripping his heart out. Shane's death is then blamed on Alex, who Shane's parents see fleeing from their house with blood on his hands. Tracked down to his house, Alex is arrested and put in jail. While in his cell, Alex is approached by Mary Lou who, after Alex rejects her once more, leaves to kill Sarah, electrocuting a pair of officers and leaving behind the keys to Alex's cell, which Alex uses to escape.

As Alex races to the prom, forcing Officer Larry to drive him there at gunpoint, Sarah is attacked by Mary Lou, who had killed Leonard by wrapping him in magnetic tape. Reaching the gymnasium as Mary Lou is about to kill Sarah on stage, Alex willingly goes to Hell with Mary Lou, making her promise that if he goes with her she will leave everyone else alone. As Mary Lou and Alex descend into the ground, Sarah follows them, jumping into the portal before it closes.

After fighting off zombified versions of Shane, Leonard and Andrew in a nightmarish version of Hamilton High with a makeshift flamethrower, Sarah tracks Alex down to Hell's equivalent of Hamilton High's gym. There, she sees Mary Lou about to kill Alex so he can be her prom king for all eternity. Sarah interrupts and, after a brief fight with Mary, manages to blow up Mary Lou by using her flamethrower as a bomb. Alex and Sarah make their way to a garage in the school and hot wire a car. Upon seeing a charred Mary Lou in the way, Alex drives into her and they disappear, reappearing on a street, no longer in Hell.

Believing the event to be over, Alex and Sarah drive to a diner to contact their parents. However, Mary Lou reappears as well and drives her arm through Sarah, killing her. While Alex tries to get others around him to help, he realizes he's in the 1950s where everyone around him apparently cannot see or hear him. Losing the last of his sanity, he admits defeat to Mary Lou and is left laughing hysterically.

== Cast ==
- Tim Conlon as Alex Grey
- Cynthia Preston as Sarah Monroe
- David Stratton as Shane Taylor
- Jeremy Ratchford as Leonard Welsh
- Dylan Neal as Andrew Douglas
- Courtney Taylor as Mary Lou Maloney
- Roger Dunn as Principal Weatherall
- George Chuvalo as Mr. Walker
- Juno Mills-Cockell as Leah Grey
- Lesley Kelly as Ms. Richards
- Terry Doyle as Jack Roswell
- Robert Collins as Darren
- Brock Sampson as Officer Larry
- Tom Nursall as Coach
- Tim Progosh as Reporter

== Production ==
The film was shot in Toronto, Ontario during a particularly frigid Autumn and as a result producer Peter Simpson was present on set to the point he received a co-director credit alongside Ron Oliver. Upon reflection Oliver admitted there were shortcomings with the final film but didn't assign blame to anyone and remained friends with Simpson despite the rough shoot. Oliver has stated the scene where Principal Weatherall (Roger Dunn) has his fingers severed was a point of pride for him as he stated it was an homage to Dario Argento's style.

== Release ==
Prom Night III: The Last Kiss was released theatrically in Canada on April 13, 1990.

=== Home media ===
The film was released direct-to-video in the United States on June 1, 1990.

The version released on a double feature DVD with Prom Night IV: Deliver Us from Evil is the edited for television print. Alternate camera angles and takes are utilized to tone down violence, language and nudity, along with dubbed or muted profanity. The initial VHS release contains the original R-Rated cut. This version has been released on DVD in other countries such as the United Kingdom, Germany and Australia.
