= Prom Night IV: Deliver Us from Evil =

1991 film by Clay Borris

- Theatrical release poster
- Directed by: Clay Borris
- Written by: Richard Beattie
- Produced by: Roy Sager
- Starring: Nicole de Boer; J. H. Wyman; Joy Tanner; Alle Ghadban
- Cinematography: Richard Wincenty
- Edited by: Stan Cole
- Music by: Paul Zaza
- Distributed by: LIVE Home Video; Norstar Releasing
- Release date: December 1991
- Running time: 92 minutes
- Country: Canada
- Language: English

Prom Night IV: Deliver Us from Evil is a 1991 Canadian slasher film directed by Clay Borris and starring Nicole de Boer and J. H. Wyman. The film follows a deranged Catholic priest who targets four teenagers on their prom night. It is the fourth film in the original Prom Night film series. Like the previous film, it was released briefly in theaters before later being released to video. The Club was intended to serve as the fifth installment of the original series, but after the producers decided the Prom Night name was waning in drawing power it was decided to release it as a standalone film without the Prom Night name.

== Plot ==
At Hamilton High School's 1957 prom, students Lisa and Brad leave the festivities to have sex in Brad's car. Before the two can undress, they are distracted by a noise, revealed to be someone putting candles on the hood of the car. After spotting the candles, Lisa has her throat slashed by a metal crucifix, wielded by psychotic religious fanatic, Father Jonas; he then kills Brad before igniting the car in flames. Father Jonas then reveals he suffered sexual abuse from priests in the church and displays stigmata. He is transported from St. Basil Seminary to the St. George Church by a group of fellow priests led by Father Jaeger, who refers to the rambling Father Jonas as an abomination and believes him possessed by dark forces.

In 1991 at St. George Church, young Father Colin is informed by the now-elderly Father Jaeger that his trip to Africa for missionary work has been put off and that he has been ordered by the church with watching over Father Jonas, who has been held captive in the church basement for thirty-three years in a drug-induced stupor. Shortly after showing Colin the catatonic Jonas, Jaeger passes away, officially leaving Colin as Jonas's new guardian. Believing he can help Jonas, Colin neglects drugging him, an act which allows Jonas to regain consciousness. Father Jonas escapes, killing Colin before fleeing to St. Basil Seminary. Discovering Colin's death and Jonas' escape, Cardinal Turint stages Colin's murder to appear as a suicide before going off in search of Jonas.

At the St. Basil Seminary, which has long since been abandoned and converted into a summer home, two young couples—consisting of the summer home owner's son Mark, his girlfriend Meagan, the mischievous Laura and her boyfriend Jeff—arrive, planning to celebrate their graduation privately instead of going to prom, but find most of the electronics and appliances in the house have been stolen. Deciding to stay and party anyway, the group is stalked by Jonas, who acquires his old metal crucifix and uses it to kill Mark's younger brother Jonathan, who had followed the group to the house.

After injuring herself in the wine cellar, Meagan receives an obscene phone call from Jonas while Mark is away, getting the first-aid kit to tend to her wounds. After calling Meagan, Jonas enters the house through his old lair and kills Laura, subsequently moving her body. While looking for the missing Laura, Mark and Meagan find Jonas's lair, while Jeff searches the attic. Finding what looks like Laura, Jeff approaches the figure, only to find it is Jonas wearing Laura's scalp; Jonas proceeds to kill Jeff by crushing the boy's skull with his bare hands.

Going outside to look around, Mark and Meagan rush back inside where they find Laura and Jeff's bodies crucified and ablaze. As Meagan tries to call the police, Mark arms himself with a gun and has Meagan flee outside when Jonas appears. Rushing to the roof of the house, Mark is stabbed in the foot through the roof by Jonas, causing him to fall to the ground below. Jonas stabs Mark to death with his crucifix, and then pursues Meagan, who temporarily manages to incapacitate him by spraying him in the face with bug spray. Outside, Meagan arms herself with the gun Mark had dropped, gets bullets from inside and, after being phoned by the police (a call which is interrupted by Jonas), goes to the wood shed. After missing several times, Meagan manages to shoot Jonas and, believing him dead, begins praying for forgiveness, only to be attacked mid-prayer by the still-living Jonas, who begins setting the barn on fire using an aspergillum that emits flames instead of holy water. Grabbing a shovel, Meagan beats Jonas with it and rushes outside and locks the door, leaving Jonas to burn and subsequently be blown up when the shed explodes.

In the morning, Meagan is loaded into an ambulance while the charred and seemingly dead Jonas is placed in another, which is manned by Cardinal Turint and his followers. While in the back of the ambulance, Jonas opens his eyes, while elsewhere Meagan does the same simultaneously.

== Cast ==
- Nicole de Boer as Meagan
- J. H. Wyman as Mark
- Joy Tanner as Laura
- Alle Ghadban as Jeff
- Kenneth McGregor as Father Jaeger
- Brock Simpson as Father Colin
- James Carver as Father Jonas
- Krista Bulmer as Lisa
- Phil Morrison as Brad
- Fab Filippo as Jonathan
- Colin D. Simpson as Larry
- Thea Andrews as Louise
- Bill Jay as Cardinal Turint
- Deni DeLory as Jennifer
- Carolyn Tweedle as Sister Jude

== Production ==
Peter Simpson hired Richard Beattie to write the script for Prom Night IV seeking a more "intellectual" and "sardonic" approach to the material than previous franchise entries. Simpson said the approach didn't really come through in the end and attributed his selection of director Clay Borris as a possible factor to the failure of this approach as he was typically more suited to low brow action films.

== Reception ==
In a retrospective assessment of the film, critic Thomas Waugh noted that the film "milks in its own way the then recent but in fact perennial abuse scandals in the Catholic Church." Chris Parry of eFilmcritic.com said the film "beats the tar out of the second and third films in the Prom Night series, but that's kind of like beating a wheelchair kid with a rake; though it might be fun for a moment or two, it's hardly a landmark achievement."

On Rotten Tomatoes, the films holds a 0% rating based on five reviews.

== Works cited ==
- Anderson, Ann (2012). High School Prom: Marketing, Morals and the American Teen. McFarland. ISBN 978-0-786-46700-6.
- Waugh, Thomas (2011). "What Do Heterosexual Men Want? Or, "The (Wandering) Queer Eye on the (Straight) Guy"". In Ramsay, Christine (ed.). Making It Like a Man: Canadian Masculinities in Practice. Wilfrid Laurier University Press. ISBN 978-1-554-58327-0.
