= Dead Man Down =

2013 American film by J.H. Wyman and Niels Arden Oplev

- Theatrical release poster
- Directed by: Niels Arden Oplev
- Written by: J.H. Wyman
- Produced by: Neal H. Moritz; J.H. Wyman
- Starring: Colin Farrell; Noomi Rapace; Dominic Cooper; Terrence Howard; Isabelle Huppert
- Cinematography: Paul Cameron
- Edited by: Timothy A. Good; Frédéric Thoraval
- Music by: Jacob Groth
- Production companies: Original Film; Frequency Films; IM Global; WWE Studios
- Distributed by: FilmDistrict
- Release date: March 8, 2013
- Running time: 118 minutes
- Country: United States
- Languages: Albanian; English; French; Spanish
- Budget: $30 million
- Box office: $19.6 million

Dead Man Down is a 2013 American action thriller film written and co-produced by J.H. Wyman and directed by Danish director Niels Arden Oplev. The film stars Colin Farrell, Noomi Rapace, Dominic Cooper, and Terrence Howard, and was released by FilmDistrict on March 8, 2013. Dead Man Down was Oplev's first film since The Girl with the Dragon Tattoo (2009), also starring Rapace and scored by Jacob Groth.

== Plot ==
Victor has infiltrated a criminal empire run by ruthless kingpin Alphonse Hoyt. His objective is to make Alphonse pay for the murder of his wife and young daughter two years earlier. Victor intends to exact revenge on Alphonse through physical and psychological torture before finally killing him.

Victor watches and is watched by Beatrice, a mysterious young woman who lives in the apartment across from his. Beatrice begins to contact Victor and show interest in him. On their first date, Beatrice reveals her true motivation: she has a video of Victor killing a man, and will go to the police unless Victor kills the drunk driver who disfigured her face.

Meanwhile, Alphonse is receiving threats against his life from Victor. During a shoot-out with Jamaicans, whom he believes are responsible for the threats, Victor saves his life and thus gains his trust. As the threats intensify, a man within Alphonse's crew and a friend of Victor's, Darcy, investigates their source. Victor has also kidnapped the brother of Albanian kingpin Ilir Brozi, who was involved in helping Alphonse dispose of Victor's family. Victor plans to pool the Albanians and Alphonse's men together so he can eliminate them all at once.

Victor stages a deliberately failed sniper attack on Alphonse from a rooftop in continuing his plans of torture. However, he is nearly caught in the process and manages to escape thanks to Beatrice, who has been following Victor. Ilir's brother, who was kidnapped by Victor, has been held tied up and blindfolded in an abandoned ship. Victor makes a video in which Ilir's brother claims that he is being held in the basement of Alphonse's warehouse, in an effort to frame Alphonse, which would lure the Albanians to the warehouse in retaliation, thereby having them all gathered in one place. He then kills Ilir's brother. Beatrice is given the memory card with the video to mail to Ilir in order to make it seem like Alphonse's crew was responsible for his brother's kidnapping.

Alphonse, now knowing the threats are coming from someone within his crew, becomes suspicious but reluctant to believe that Victor is the traitor due to him previously saving his life. Victor later notifies Beatrice that he didn't kill the drunk driver so that they can spend more time together, knowing the psychological effect that the murder would have had on her. Victor sets up a trap for the Albanians and Alphonse, but Beatrice reveals through a call that she didn't mail the memory card because she didn't want to see Victor die. At that moment, Darcy, who has found Victor's true intentions while investigating his apartment, subdues Beatrice and informs Victor she is being held captive at Alphonse's house.

As Alphonse and the Albanians gather in the house, Victor crashes into the house with his truck. Victor spares Darcy's life in the ensuing gunfight and makes his way to the top floor where Beatrice is held by Alphonse and Ilir. Beatrice escapes their watch while they are distracted by Victor's successful advance, and she begins to play the video on a computer. As Ilir hears the video, he turns his gun on Alphonse who he believes has betrayed him; they kill each other.

As Victor escapes with Beatrice, Darcy confronts them with his gun raised. When asked if he spared Darcy because he has a wife and child, Victor replies, "No, because they've got you" before dropping his gun. Darcy also lowers his gun and allows the two to leave. Victor and Beatrice travel home on a subway and share a kiss.

== Cast ==
- Colin Farrell as Victor
- Noomi Rapace as Beatrice
- Dominic Cooper as Darcy
- Terrence Howard as Alphonse
- F. Murray Abraham as Gregor
- Armand Assante as Lon Gordon
- Wade Barrett as Kilroy
- Luis Da Silva as Terry
- Isabelle Huppert as Valentine Louzon
- James Biberi as Ilir

== Production ==
The abandoned cruise liner ship is the S.S. United States, which was docked in Philadelphia at the time, although the film is set in New York City.

== Reception ==
Dead Man Down received mostly negative reviews from critics. On Rotten Tomatoes, the film holds a 42% approval rating from 104 reviews, with an average score of 5.10/10. The site's consensus reads: "While the fine cast keeps Dead Man Down watchable throughout, the film is weighted down by absurd plot twists and a slack pace." Metacritic gives the film a score of 39/100, based on reviews from 24 critics, indicating "generally unfavorable" reviews. Audiences polled by CinemaScore gave the film an average grade of "B−" on an A+ to F scale.

Peter Bradshaw of The Guardian gave the film 1 out of 5 stars, which he called "intensely pointless and silly" and "violent and boring nonsense", with Farrell "smoulderingly, facially immobile". In contrast, film director Takefumi Tsutsui gave the film 5 out of 5 stars. Michael Rechtshaffen of The Hollywood Reporter noted "various thematic influences ranging from Rear Window to True Romance" and praised the "potent visuals and a compelling international cast" but ultimately found the film "uninspired" with an unrewarding climax.

The film grossed $5,345,250 in its first box office weekend. Against a budget of $30 million, it went on to earn a total of $18,074,539 worldwide, making it a box office bomb.
