= Thunder Hill Provincial Park =

Provincial park in British Columbia, Canada

- IUCN category II (national park)
- Location within British Columbia
- Interactive map of Thunder Hill Provincial Park
- Location: British Columbia, Canada
- Nearest city: Invermere
- Coordinates: 50°10′04″N 115°51′19″W
- Area: 0.44 km^{2} (0.17 sq mi)
- Established: February 5, 1960
- Governing body: BC Parks

Thunder Hill Provincial Park is a provincial park in British Columbia, Canada.
