= The Club (1994 film) =

- Film poster
- Directed by: Brenton Spencer
- Written by: Robert C. Cooper
- Produced by: Ilana Frank; Dale Hildebrand
- Starring: J. H. Wyman; Kim Coates; Andrea Roth
- Distributed by: Imperial Entertainment Corporation
- Release date: May 4, 1994
- Running time: 88 minutes
- Country: Canada
- Language: English

The Club is a 1994 Canadian slasher film. The film was initially intended to be the fifth film in the Prom Night film series but was instead released as a standalone film and the only connection being series executive producer Peter Simpson.

== Synopsis ==
The film follows five students, Evan and his girlfriend Amy, the abusive Kyle and his girlfriend Laura, and the nerdy Darren. All are attending their school's senior prom, which is being held in a gothic castle. The night begins well, however Evan finds himself forced to listen to the school's creepy guidance counselor, Mr. Carver, make extremely sexualized remarks about Evan's girlfriend Amy. He leaves angrily, after which Carver is approached by the mysterious John, who reveals that Carver is a serial rapist who murders his victims afterwards. Infuriated, Carver murders John and then leaves to drive Amy into the basement so he can rape her. This causes the other promgoers to vanish just as the clock is about to strike midnight.

Carver manages to find and begin his assault on Amy, but is stopped by Evan, who beats the man into unconsciousness. Evan and Amy meet up with the other teens and an unharmed John, where they discover that they are unable to leave the castle. They decide to split into two groups, John, Evan, and Kyle in one group and Laura, Amy, and Darren in the other. During the investigations the second group discovers John's picture in a series of books marked "suicides" and realize that he is not human. The girls rush off to warn the others, leaving Darren by himself. This leaves him vulnerable to John, who uses a doppelganger to torment and trick Darren into committing suicide. He then goes after Kyle and Laura, picking them off one by one until only Evan and Amy are left. Pleased that the two are putting up a good fight, John decides to explain what is happening.

John reveals that he is a lesser demon who has trapped them all so that he could have fun tormenting and testing them with their greatest fears. Evan realizes that John can only hurt them if they succumb to their fears, however Amy is unable to conquer her fear of Carver. John uses this opportunity to bring back Carver and the two capture the teens. Evan awakens to find that he is tied up so that he is forced to watch Carver assault Amy. However before this can occur, Evan and Amy free themselves and overpower Carver.

The film ends with all of the students getting returned to the prom, unaware of what has occurred. Despite expressing a desire to change in the alternate realm, Kyle begins abusing Laura and accidentally pushes her off a balcony to her death in front of the other promgoers. The film ends with Carver staring at Amy, implying that he will still pursue her and make her his latest victim.

== Cast ==
- J. H. Wyman as John Rotman
- Kim Coates as Mr. Carver
- Andrea Roth as Amy
- Rino Romano as Evan
- Zack Ward as Kyle

== Production ==
Producer Peter Simpson had initially intended to release The Club as the fifth entry in the Prom Night film series but decided against it after believing the Prom Night name was waning in drawing power.

== Release ==
The Club was released direct-to-video on May 4, 1994. Despite dropping its original intended title of Prom Night V for its release in the United States, it was released in some territories under that title such as Japan.

== Reception ==
Bleeding Skull reviewed the film in 2015, criticizing it as an overly generic movie and that "it lacks inventiveness and urgency; it doesn’t inspire or add anything new to prom night horror." Billboard had similar criticisms in their 1994 review, writing that "Its incoherence and talkiness are mitigated by its nightmarish visual style - which may help appease fright fans."
