= Brenton Spencer =

Canadian film and television director

Brenton Spencer is a Canadian film and television director and cinematographer. His television credits include Earth: Final Conflict, Andromeda, 21 Jump Street, Mutant X, Poltergeist: The Legacy, Sanctuary, Stargate Atlantis, The Flash and among other series. His film credits include Blown Away (1992) starring Corey Haim, Corey Feldman and Nicole Eggert, The Club (1994) starring J. H. Wyman and Kim Coates, Never Cry Werewolf (2008) starring Nina Dobrev and Paradox (2009) starring Kevin Sorbo, which was screened at the Cannes Independent Film Festival in 2010.
