= Cynthia Preston =

Canadian actress (born 1968)

- Born: Toronto, Ontario, Canada
- Other name: Cyndy Preston
- Occupation: Actress
- Years active: 1986–present
- Spouse: Kyle Martin (m. 2000; div. 2012)
- Website: www.cynthiapreston.com

Cynthia Preston, sometimes credited as Cyndy Preston, is a Canadian actress.

== Life and career ==
Preston was born in Toronto, Ontario. She made her screen debut in the 1986 television film Miles to Go... playing Jill Clayburgh' daughter. She appeared in a number of Canadian television dramas the following years, include Night Heat, Diamonds, The Hitchhiker, and Street Legal. She played the female leading roles in horror films Pin (1988), The Brain (1988), and Prom Night III: The Last Kiss (1989).

Preston starred in the 1994 award-winning comedy-drama film Whale Music opposite Maury Chaykin. In 1999, she starred in the Showtime science fiction series Total Recall 2070 alongside Michael Easton. The series was canceled after single season of 22 episodes. She guest-starred on The X-Files, Andromeda, CSI: Crime Scene Investigation, Two and a Half Men, Bones, Flashpoint and Hannibal. From 2002 to 2005, she played Faith Rosco in the American daytime soap opera General Hospital.

Preston appeared in the 2013 supernatural horror film Carrie directed by Kimberly Peirce. She starred in more than ten Lifetime television movies, including The Love of Her Life (2008), Dead at 17 (2008), A Sister's Secret (2009), The Wife He Met Online (2012), A Nanny's Revenge (2012), The Secret Sex Life of a Single Mom (2014), Stalked by a Reality Star (2018), and The Cheerleader Escort (2019).

== Filmography ==
Film
Year	Title	Role	Notes
1988	The Dark Side	Laura	
1988	Pin	Ursula Linden	
1988	The Brain	Janet	
1990	Prom Night III: The Last Kiss	Sarah Monroe	
1991	If Looks Could Kill	Melissa Tyler	
1994	Whale Music	Claire Lowe	
1998	Joseph's Gift	Lydia	
1998	The Ultimate Weapon	Mary Kate	
1999	Convergence	Ali Caine	
2000	Left-Overs	Beth	
2001	Living in Fear	Mary Hausman	
2001	Facing the Enemy	Nikki Mayhew	
2003	The Event	Amy	
2006	Domestic Import	Marsha McMillan	
2010	Locked Away	Rachel	
2013	Carrie	Eleanor Snell	
2013	Only I...	Linda	

Television
Year	Title	Role	Notes
1986	The Lawrenceville Stories	Sally	Episode: "The Beginning of the Firm"
1986	Miles to Go...	Jani Browning	Television film
1986	Hangin' In	Sara	Episode: "There Goes the Bride"
1987	American Playhouse	Sally	Episode: "The Prodigious Hickey"
1987	Night Heat		Episode: "Simon Says"
1989	Emergency Room	Melany Baker	Episode: "1.13"
1989	Diamonds		Episode: "Coming of Age"
1989	The Hitchhiker	Stephanie	Episode: "The Dying Generation"
1989	Street Legal	Jeanine Hudson	Episode: "Home"
1989	The Legend of Zelda	Princess Zelda	Voice, 13 episodes
1989–1990	Friday the 13th: The Series	Grace Colwell, Stephanie	2 episodes
1990	Katts and Dog		Episode: "And the Winner Is..."
1990	E.N.G.	Linda Slater	Episode: "Ripples in a Pond"
1990	My Secret Identity	Penny; Staci	Episode: "More Than Meets the Eye"; Episode: "Ground Control"
1991	Street Legal	Fiona Crossley	Episode: "The Truth"
1991	Tropical Heat	Mina	Episode: "Double Time"
1991	Beyond Reality	Jenny Lambert	Episode: "Return Visit"
1992	To Catch a Killer	Cindy Beck	Television film
1992	Forever Knight	Ann Foley	Episode: "Dance by the Light of the Moon"
1993	Neon Rider	Susan 'Sunflower' Sarandon	Episode: "Walking Tall"
1993	Matrix	Carolyn Beals	Episode: "Blindside"
1993	The Hidden Room	Jackie	Episode: "Dreams About Water"
1994	Madonna: Innocence Lost	Jude O'Mally	Television film
1995	Taking the Falls	Moira	Episode: "Elvis Has Left the Building"
1995	The Outer Limits	Mina Link	Episode: "I, Robot"
1995	Black Fox	Delores Holtz / Morning Star	Television film
1995	Black Fox: The Price of Peace	Delores Holtz / Morning Star	Television film
1995	Picture Windows	Daughter	Episode: "Armed Response"
1998	Once a Thief	Ivy	Episode: "That Old Gang of Mine"
1998	Viper	May Beth Andrews	Episode: "Paper Trail"
1998	The X-Files	Nancy Aaronson	Episode: "Folie à Deux"
1999	Relic Hunter	Hanna	Episode: "Flag Day"
2000	Falcone	Alana	Episode: "That's Amore"
2000	The Thin Blue Line	Kate Johnson	Television film
2000	The Trouble with Normal	Audrey	Episode: "Not the Pilot"
2001	Loves Music, Loves to Dance	Erin Kelley	Television film
2002	Andromeda	Liandra	Episode: "The Things We Cannot Change"
2002	CSI: Crime Scene Investigation	Waitress	Episode: "High and Low"
2002–2005	General Hospital	Faith Roscoe	Recurring role
2004	Less than Perfect	Monique	Episode: "Arctic Nights"
2005	Two and a Half Men	Heather	Episode: "A Sympathetic Crotch to Cry On"
2005	Numb3rs	Mrs. McHugh	Episode: "Toxin"
2007	'Til Lies Do Us Part	Jeanette	Television film
2007	Bones	Amelia Trattner	Episode: "The Widow's Son in the Windshield"
2008	A Woman's Rage	Allison Hagan	Television film
2008	Lone Rider	Constance	Television film
2008	Dead at 17	Julie	Television film
2009	A Sister's Secret	Jane	Television film
2010	Haven	Vanessa Stanley	Episode: "The Hand You're Dealt"
2011	The Wife He Met Online	Virginia Meyers	Television film
2011	Flashpoint	Sue Fuller	Episode: "Through a Glass Darkly"
2012	Whiskey Business	Jess	Television film
2012	A Nanny's Revenge	Vanessa Prince	Television film
2013	Lost Girl	Selene	Episode: "Sleeping Beauty School"
2014	Republic of Doyle	Tilda Spence	Episode: "Frame Job"
2014	Ascension	Laura Enzmann	2 episodes
2017	The Wrong Bed: Naked Pursuit	Emily	Television film
2017	Saving Hope	Lindsay Rush	Episode: "Problem Child"
2018	Stalked by a Reality Star	Linn	Television film
2018	Good Witch	Helen	Episode: "Match Game"
2018	Jack Ryan	Blanche Dubois	Episode: "Black 22"
2019	The Cheerleader Escort	Karen Talbot	Television film
