= Clay Borris =

Canadian film director and screenwriter

Clay Borris (born March 31, 1950) is a Canadian film and television director and screenwriter. He is most noted for his 1981 film Alligator Shoes, for which he was a shortlisted Genie Award nominee for Best Original Screenplay at the 3rd Genie Awards in 1982.

Born in Campbellton, New Brunswick, and raised in the Cabbagetown district of Toronto, Ontario, his first short film Parliament Street was released in 1968. He made a number of further short films, including Paper Boy and Rose's House, before releasing Alligator Shoes, his feature debut, in 1981; Rose's House was a Canadian Film Award nominee for Best TV Drama at the 28th Canadian Film Awards in 1977.

He has a few acting credits, including both Rose's House and Alligator Shoes, as well as in Peter Vronsky's 1980 film Bad Company. His continued focus on directing included the action film Quiet Cool in 1986, the television western The Gunfighters in 1987 and the horror film Prom Night IV: Deliver Us from Evil in 1992. In the 1990s, he concentrated primarily on television work, including episodes of Katts and Dog, Night Heat, Top Cops, Tropical Heat, Highlander: The Series, Forever Knight, The Adventures of Sinbad, Psi Factor, and Relic Hunter.
