= Paul Lynch (director) =

Canadian film and television director (born 1946

- Born: June 11, 1946 (age 80); Liverpool, Merseyside, England
- Occupations: Film director, television director
- Years active: 1968–present

Paul Lynch (born June 11, 1946) is an English-born Canadian film director and television director. He is a three-time Gemini Award and a Directors Guild of America Award nominee.

== Life and career ==
Lynch was born in Liverpool in 1946, and raised in Hoylake. His family emigrated to Canada in when he was 11-years-old, settling in Oakville, Ontario. He cited Stanley Kubrick and fellow Canadian director Sidney J. Furie as inspirations. He left school at age 16 to become a cartoonist for the Toronto Star and then served as a photographer for a number of small-town newspapers, as well as the Toronto Star, Maclean's and Toronto Life.

This led to work in film, including a 90-minute documentary on Penthouse magazine commissioned by its publisher, Bob Guccione. His first feature film was The Hard Part Begins. This was followed by the box-office hit Prom Night, a straightforward slasher film starring Jamie Lee Curtis and Leslie Nielsen. Lynch has only made movies periodically, pursuing instead a career directing for American television.

== Filmography ==
=== Films ===
- The Hard Part Begins (1973)
- Blood & Guts (1978)
- Prom Night (1980)
- Humongous (1982)
- Cross Country (1983)
- Mania (1986)
- Flying (1986)
- Bullies (1986)
- Blindside (1987)
- On the Prowl (1991)
- No Contest (1995)
- No Contest II (1997)
- More to Love (1999)
- Frozen with Fear (2000)
- The Keeper (2004)
- The Christmas Switch (2014)

=== Television ===
- Petrocelli (1974)
- Darkroom (1981)
- Voyagers! (1982)
- Murder, She Wrote (1984)
- Moonlighting (1985)
- The Ray Bradbury Theater (1985)
- The Twilight Zone (1985)
- Blacke's Magic (1986)
- Mike Hammer (1987)
- Tour of Duty (1987)
- Beauty and the Beast (1987)
- Star Trek: The Next Generation (episodes: "The First Duty", "11001001", "The Naked Now", "Unnatural Selection" and "A Matter of Time")
- Hooperman (1988)
- The Bronx Zoo (1988)
- Beverly Hills Buntz (1988)
- In the Heat of the Night (1989)
- Top Cops (1990)
- Dark Shadows (1991)
- Matrix (1993)
- Star Trek: Deep Space Nine (1993) (episodes: "A Man Alone", "Babel", "Q-Less", "The Passenger" and "Battle Lines")
- Kung Fu: The Legend Continues (1993)
- Robocop: The Series (1994)
- Due South (1994)
- Lonesome Dove: The Series (1994)
- Liberty Street (1994)
- Xena: Warrior Princess (1995)
- Land's End (1995)
- Baywatch Nights (1995)
- The Outer Limits (1995)
- Viper (1995)
- F/X: The Series (1996)
- Poltergeist: The Legacy (1996)
- The Magician's House (1999)
- Sliders (1998-1999)
- So Weird (1999-2001)

==== Television films and miniseries ====
- Teenage Marriage (1968)
- Really Weird Tales (1986)
- Cameo by Night (1987)
- Going to the Chapel (a.k.a. Wedding Day Blues, 1988)
- Maigret (1988)
- She Knows Too Much (1989)
- Murder by Night (a.k.a. Nightmare, 1989)
- Double Your Pleasure (a.k.a. The Reluctant Agent, 1989)
- How to Murder a Millionaire (1990)
- Drop Dead Gorgeous (a.k.a. Victim of Beauty, 1991)
- Spenser: Ceremony (1993)
- Taken Too Far (2017)
