= J. H. Wyman =

American film director

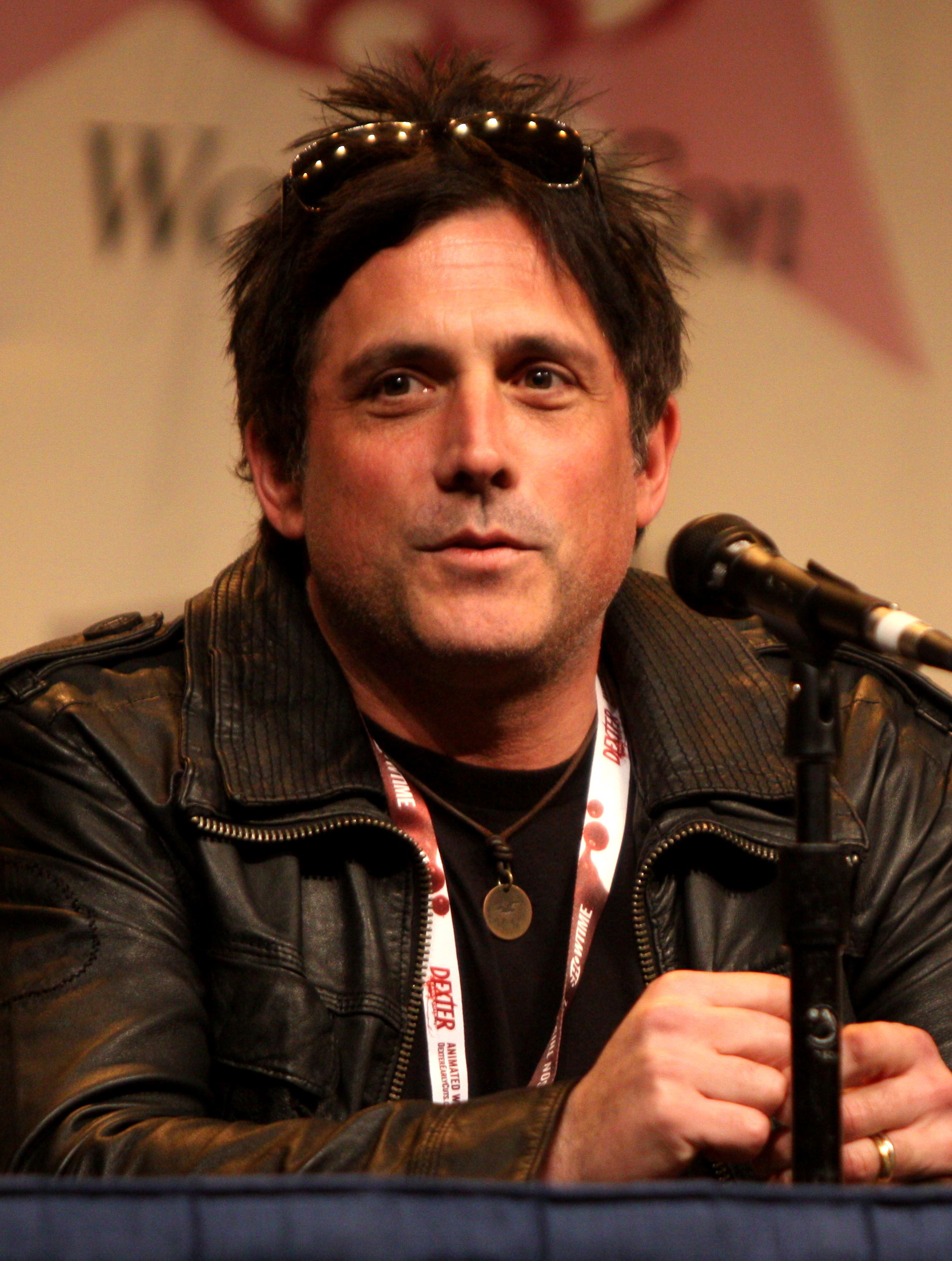
- Born: Joel Howard Wyman; January 5, 1967 (age 59); Oakland, California, U.S.
- Other name: Joel Wyner
- Education: American Academy of Dramatic Arts
- Occupations: Actor; Writer; Producer; Director; Musician
- Years active: 1992–present

Joel Howard "J. H." Wyman (born January 5, 1967) is a retired actor, film and television screenwriter, producer, and director. He is also a musician. Wyman is perhaps best known for his work on the Fox science fiction shows Fringe and Almost Human, and wrote and produced the films The Mexican (2001) and Dead Man Down (2013).

== Early life and education ==
Wyman was born January 5, 1967, in Oakland, California, but grew up in Montreal, Quebec. He left for Toronto to pursue an acting career and later attended the American Academy of Dramatic Arts in Los Angeles, California.

== Career ==
Acting

During the 1990s under the stage name Joel Wyner, Wyman took roles in Canadian television films and series such as Street Legal (1991), Counterstrike (1992), Catwalk (1992–95), the Canadian-American series Sirens (1994–95), Highlander: The Series (1993), and a few theatrical films.

Writing and producing

Wyman segued into writing and producing in the late 90s and early 2000s. While still under the name Joel Wyner, he wrote and directed the theatrical film Pale Saints.

His first major feature script was The Mexican (2001) starring Julia Roberts and Brad Pitt, directed by Gore Verbinski. He then created the FOX series Keen Eddie (2003).

In 2008, Wyman joined the first season of the FOX science fiction series Fringe as a writer and co-executive producer. At the start of season two, he was promoted to executive producer and co-showrunner (titles he shared with Jeff Pinkner). At the beginning of season five, he became the sole showrunner. He also directed two episodes: "A Short Story About Love" (season 4, episode 15) and the season-five finale, "An Enemy of Fate".

Wyman is the creator, executive producer and showrunner of the FOX science-fiction series Almost Human (2013).

In 1997, Wyman formed his production company, Frequency Films, which produced such film and TV projects as Pale Saints, Keen Eddie, Almost Human and Dead Man Down.

On January 11, 2020, Wyman wrote a script for the pilot episode of a new Debris television series for Legendary Television and Universal Television. On June 29, 2020, NBC announced that the production had been given a series order.

Music

He is also a musician and performs with the alternative rock band Angels of Mercy. On December 4, 2016, Main Man Records will release Angels of Mercy's self-titled debut.

== Personal life ==
Wyman lives in Los Angeles, California.

== Filmography ==
=== Actor ===
Joel Wyner film and television actor credits
Year	Title	Role	Notes	Ref.
1991	Street Legal	Michael Jones	Episode: "The Good Lawyer"	
1991	Alexander Graham Bell: The Sound and the Silence	Lt. Selfridge	Television film	
1991	Prom Night IV: Deliver Us from Evil	Mark	Theatrical film (as Alden Kane)	
1992	Counterstrike	Louis Galado	Episode: "Cat in the Cradle"	
1992–1995	Catwalk	Billy-K (William Kramer)	45 episodes	
1993	Family Pictures	Tucker	2 episodes	
1993	Highlander: The Series	Gregor / Greg Powers	Episode: "Studies in Light"	
1994	Kung Fu: The Legend Continues	Jimmy Leola	Episode: "An Ancient Lottery"	
1994	The Club	John Rotman	Theatrical film	
1994–1995	Sirens	Lt. Lyle Springer	22 episodes	
1996	Toe Tags	Unknown	Television film	
1996	Listen	Randy Wilkes	Theatrical film	
1997	Pacific Palisades	Cory Robbins	6 episodes	
1998	Random Encounter	Kyle Jones	Theatrical film	

=== Writer, producer, director ===
J. H. Wyman film writer/producer/director credits
Year	Title	Director	Writer	Producer	Notes	Ref.
1997	Pale Saints	Yes	Yes	No	Credited as "Joel Wyner"	
2000	Mr. Rice's Secret	No	Yes	No		
2001	The Mexican	No	Yes	Yes		
2013	Dead Man Down	No	Yes	Yes		

J. H. Wyman television writer/producer/director credits
Year	Title	Director	Writer	Producer	Creator	Notes	Ref.
2003–2004	Keen Eddie	No	Yes	Yes	Yes	Writer (9 episodes)	
2004	Harry Green and Eugene	No	Yes	Yes	Yes		
2004	Repo Cohen	No	Yes	No	No	TV movie	
2006	13 Graves	No	Yes	No	No	TV movie	
2008–2013	Fringe	Yes	Yes	Yes	No	Director (2 episodes); Writer (32 episodes)	
2013–2014	Almost Human	No	Yes	Yes	Yes	Writer (2 episodes)	
2021	Debris	No	Yes	Yes	Yes	Writer (8 episodes)	
