= Ron Oliver =

Canadian writer, director and producer

Ron Oliver (born 1960) is a Canadian writer, director, producer, and actor known for genre films, especially for his work for the Hallmark Channel's Christmas movies.

His directing career began with the cult hit Hello Mary Lou: Prom Night II, based on a script he wrote. He was also a host on Canada's YTV for the shows YTV Hits, The Ron Oliver Show, Oliver's Twist & Rock 'n Talk. He has gone on to direct various television and motion picture scripts. He has been nominated twice for the Directors Guild of America Award. Oliver directed several episodes of both Are You Afraid of the Dark? and Goosebumps, in which he cast a then-teenage Ryan Gosling.

In 2007 he began directing films for the Hallmark Channel, and as of late 2024, he has written or directed 34 movies for them.

He received an Emmy nomination for producing the NBC children's series Scout's Safari filmed on location in South Africa. In 2007 he directed the direct-to-video film A Dennis the Menace Christmas. In 2010 Oliver directed the Disney Channel film Harriet the Spy: Blog Wars. Among his other works are the sequels Grand-Daddy Day Care and Bigger Fatter Liar.

== Personal life ==
Oliver was born in 1960 and raised in the village of Dundalk, Ontario; his family moved to moved to New Lowell when he was 9. His father George was a real estate agent, an insurance broker, and ran a boat-building company while his mother Helen was a homemaker. As a teenager, he used his school’s Super 8 camera to make films, with the dream of becoming a maker of horror films. At age 24 he moved to Toronto, then to Los Angeles in 1989, travelling back and forth between the U.S. and Canada for work as his career developed.

He is married to Eric Bowes; the couple were married at the Plaza Hotel on Christmas Day in 2013. Later a selfie of Oliver at the Plaza prompted Hallmark executives asked him if he wanted to make a Christmas movie set there, fan-favorite 2019's Christmas at the Plaza was partially filmed at the New York City landmark. The couple live in Palm Springs.
