= Cinépix =

Canadian film production company

- Formerly: C/FP Distribution (1989–1994); Cinépix Film Properties (1994–1998)
- Industry: Film
- Predecessor: Niagara Films; Amerivision
- Founded: June 15, 1962; 64 years ago
- Defunct: 1996 (as a brand); January 13, 1998 (as a company)
- Fate: Most assets acquired by Lions Gate Entertainment
- Successor: Lionsgate Films
- Headquarters: 3600 Boulevard Thimens, Saint-Laurent, Quebec, Canada (final headquarters)
- Area served: Canada; United States
- Key people: John Dunning (founder, chairman of the board); André Link (president)
- Subsidiaries: DAL Productions; Cinema International Canada; Avalanche Releasing; CinéGroupe
- Website: cinepix.ca

Cinépix Inc., once doing business as C/FP Distribution and Cinépix Film Properties, was a Canadian film production and distribution company. It was established in 1962 in Montreal, Quebec, by John Dunning, who soon teamed up with André Link. A key player in the development of commercial Canadian cinema, it is perhaps best known for the comedic Meatballs franchise, the thriller My Bloody Valentine and the controversial Ilsa series of sex and violence films. In the mid-1990s, the company became an important distributor of independent films in the U.S., before being acquired by the newly formed Lions Gate Entertainment and morphing into Lions Gate Films in 1998.

== History ==
=== Founding and early years ===
Cinépix started as the successor company of Amerivision, a Montreal film distributor specializing in prestige French imports, which it sold to Télévision de Radio Canada (the Francophone equivalent of CBC). When Amerivision's parent Niagara Films was abruptly shut down by its founder Fernand Séguin in 1962, one of his partners, John Dunning, established Cinépix to take over its catalogue and pay their creditors. Dunning put the films in local theatres, but it was not enough to make the company viable. After a few months, he brought in theatrical booker André Link to help. The latter would become his lifelong friend and associate. To make ends meet, they expanded into exploitation films of wildly varying origins and quality, often tweaking titles to make them appear more salacious than what was allowed at the time. Among audience favorites were European imports concerning prostitution. Around 1968, Cinépix opened an office in Toronto, headed by industry veteran Orval Fruitman, who would remain with the company until 1979.

=== Erotic productions ===
Also in 1968, the company signed up director Denis Héroux for its first production, Valérie, which retained the tried-and-true prostitution theme. To placate Quebec's harsh censorship, the filmmakers purported to showcase a gentler, more politically aware view of sex. Nonetheless, Dunning and Link used the collective pseudonym "Julian Parnell" in the credits, which would become their go-to alias. Valérie was the first Quebec film to top $1 million at the box office. Its sole profits were enough to finance two quick follow-ups iterating on the softcore formula, Here and Now (Cinépix's first color production) and Love in a Four Letter World (its first English-language production). For the most part, Dunning was the creative half of the duo, while Link was the businessman. Other producers followed suit, and this trend was coined as "Maple Syrup Porn" by U.S. trade magazine Variety. In late 1970, Dunning hired lawyer Alfred Pariser to assist him as director of production. He would stay until 1975.

The commercial success of Cinépix's films initially trumped their risqué nature in Quebec media and, to some extent, in other provinces. Several local celebrities including Donald Lautrec, Serge Laprade and Chantal Renaud, and even Boston Bruins player Derek Sanderson, appeared in them. Valérie and some of its successors were supported by the CFDC (later Telefilm Canada), whose president Michael Spencer understood the need for commercial product to strengthen the country's burgeoning film industry. Saturday Night critic Marshall Delaney wrote: "What is so beautiful and so historic about Valérie is the way it defines, in 1969 terms, the traditional morality of Roman Catholic French Canada." However, reviewers typically had little to say about the film beyond its sociological novelty.

=== Alignment with Allied Artists (1969–1973) ===
Between 1969 and 1970, Kalvex, the parent company of Allied Artists, built a majority participation in Cinépix, which was supposed to help it reach a broader market. Although Here an Now and Love in a Four Letter World were nominated for the 1970 Canadian Film Awards, bad buzz ahead of the event convinced Dunning and Link to withdraw them from the competition. Calling it a publicity stunt, jury member and Loyola teacher Marc Gervais nonetheless welcomed their decision and dismissed Cinépix's work as "candy coated skin trash". Dunning and Link opened a distribution office in New York called Cinepix-U.S.A., and produced Keep It in the Family, a virtually non-nude sex comedy starring former American heartthrob John Gavin. But Kalvex's support proved limited. The pair bought back their controlling stake in early 1973 and repatriated operations to Canada. The Cinepix-U.S.A. label was retained for some bookings south of the border, although it was effectively operated from Montreal.

The company kept mulling options to find better financing, such as a stock market introduction, and a sale to Montreal-based TV station Télé-Metropole, but nothing came of them. Instead, Cinépix announced a two-film joint venture with Pierre David's Films Mutuels in 1973, which saw them distribute the documentary Wrestling Queen and produce yet another sex comedy, The Apple, the Stem and the Seeds. Also that year, Cinépix was one of ten companies who set up the Association of Canadian Independent Motion Picture Distributors, of which Fruitman was named the inaugural president. In its home province of Quebec, it claimed to distribute up to 100 films a year.

=== Dual profile ===
As a distributor, Cinépix helped bring many more artistic films to the screen. A 1973 Montreal Gazette article assessed that "last year [Dunning] handled almost every acclaimed Canadian feature in both French and English." In 1974, it took over the distribution of two projects from Canada's leading helmers, Claude Jutra's For Better and for Worse and Denys Arcand's Gina, when their competitor, Société nouvelle de cinématographie, backed out of their financial participation. However, their practice of misrepresenting their films' contents in promotional materials occasionally extended to the more artistically oriented product they carried.

By then, the liberalization of film content had only exacerbated Cinépix's dual profile, which Dunning once described as "schizoid". While courting acceptance from the mainstream entertainment industry, it relied on less savory language to peddle more explicit wares to exploitation film exhibitors. Although Link was Jewish and a holocaust survivor, the company dabbled in the controversial Nazi exploitation subgenre, distributing the pioneering Love Camp 7, before commissioning the infamous Ilsa, She-Wolf of the SS. Link and Dunning typically went uncredited for these fringe activities.

=== Nurturing filmmakers ===
Regardless of its standing with critics, Cinépix's commercial ambitions made it one of the few alternatives to the NFB among aspiring Canadian filmmakers. In 1973, Christian Larouche joined the company as a truck driver. He would ascend to the position of vice president, producing mainly Francophone films and eventually striking out on his own with Christal Films. That year, Loyola student Don Carmody also joined, working as a gofer on U-Turn before becoming a production executive. The company's reputation soon extended beyond Quebec's borders. Hamilton's Ivan Reitman initially approached them to help him find a distributor for his bawdy comedy The Columbus of Sex. Cinépix funded part of his sophomore effort Foxy Lady, and Link eventually offered Reitman to become an in-house producer for them in 1974. Toronto's David Cronenberg also reached out to Link and Dunning and shot a test scene for a sex comedy, Loving and Laughing. Cronenberg's style was deemed unfit for it, but they encouraged him to keep in touch if a better project presented itself. This was representative of Dunning's meticulous production style, which involved considerable tinkering.

For their role in kickstarting several notable careers, Link and Dunning have sometimes been called the "Roger Cormans of Canada", a sentiment most notably echoed by Cronenberg. However, film historian Paul Corupe has contended that the Canadian market was too different from Hollywood for such a comparison to apply, while Larry Kent, a two-time director for Cinépix, has argued that its output often possessed a level of creativity beyond that of Corman's more derivative product.

=== Horror and thriller ===
As the box office was becoming saturated with softcore pictures, Cinépix opted for the next commercial genre, horror. Their first attempt was The Possession of Virginia, which laced its trademark eroticism with mild esoterism. But it was not successful. They also offered a distribution deal to Ivan Reitman for Cannibal Girls, which helped him secure CFDC financing. Even the liberal CFDC dragged its feet, however, when Cronenberg returned to Dunning with a project that ushered in what came to be known as body horror. Eventually released in 1975, Shivers generated unprecedented international sales for a Canadian film, and much publicity at home for its ill-advised use of taxpayer money. Marshall Delaney, one of Valérie's chief apologists, led the charge against Shivers and the CFDC. In response, Link sent a pamphlet titled "Is there a place for horror in Canada's film industry?" to critics nationwide. Similarly violent works followed with William Fruet's Death Weekend and Cronenberg's Rabid, which featured the novelty casting of adult film star Marilyn Chambers, although CFDC support became inconsistent in the wake of the Shivers controversy. To keep up with inflating budgets, Dunning and Link turned to Lawrence Nesis' Filmco of Winnipeg, a tax shelter broker, for their next batch of projects.

In 1978, Cinépix merged its sales division with that of Saguenay Films, a short-lived outfit started by former Astral boss Martin Bockner. They shared a new office on Bloor Street in Toronto. In January 1980, the RCMP seized 275 films from Cinépix for failure to pay performing rights on some of them. Dunning countered that no exhibitor paid the tax, which would add 32 percent to releasing costs and make the entire theatrical business unviable in Canada. Charges were ultimately not laid.

=== Mainstream projects ===
Although Cinépix had seemingly lost Ivan Reitman after the 1978 success of his first major production Animal House, Hollywood's reluctance to let him direct led him back to his previous employer for a spiritual successor, Meatballs. Reitman sold it to Paramount and it became the highest grossing Canadian film up to that point. Although the sale's flat fee did not drastically boost Cinépix's finances, it did improve its profile. The company landed another Paramount pickup with My Bloody Valentine, while Columbia bought Happy Birthday to Me. Both films exploited the ongoing holiday horror film craze.

Reitman again came through when he helped arrange Dunning and Link's first studio production, Spacehunter: Adventures in the Forbidden Zone. However, it was repackaged as a 3D film and rushed to the screens to compete with Return of the Jedi, which proved an insurmountable task. After further disappointments with 20th Century Fox on The Vindicator and ITC Entertainment on State Park, they decided to focus on independent productions. They also lost their connection to Reitman when they opted to churn out low quality Meatballs sequels (two of which were actually licensed to other companies), which displeased the director. In 1986, Vancouver's Jeffrey Barmash joined the company's legal department, and later graduated to producing. In 1988, Cinépix moved into the video-friendly action genre with Snake Eater, the first in a series of Lorenzo Lamas vehicles that made the latter a B-movie staple, while earning the company more criticism for some jarring instances of bad taste.

=== Alliance with Famous Players (1989–1994) ===
In 1989, Cinépix merged its distribution business with Cinexus Famous Players, itself a recent alliance of producer Cinexus and theater chain Famous Players, to form C/FP Distribution. The move was motivated by a similar union between Alliance and Cineplex Odeon. Cinexus quickly left the partnership, and Cinépix became the majority stakeholder. Christian Larouche was in charge of French distribution, while Famous Players higher-ups managed English operations. C/FP scored early coups with Cyrano de Bergerac and Lionheart, in an effort to nab Canadian rights to indie films before its U.S. distributors could get them bundled with their own territory, as was the norm. In 1991, Link brought in Jeff Sackman, previously vice president of Cineplex Odeon, to beef up Cinepix's English distribution staff. Sackman helped reach an output deal with Miramax between 1991 and 1994, which was followed by a briefer association with Sony Pictures Classics in 1994–95. In 1992, Cinépix acquired Vancouver-based Festival Films, an ailing arthouse distributor formed by former Toronto and Vancouver Festival boss Leonard Schein.

With the emphasis put on distribution, founder John Dunning started feeling alienated from his own company, as Cinépix distanced itself from the hands-on, Quebec-based productions that had been his lifetime's work, in favor of outsourcing direct-to-video product to Ontario-based third parties, chiefly producers David Mitchell and Damian Lee, with whom Sackman had a working relationship from their days at Rose & Ruby and Cineplex, respectively. In 1994, Cinépix acquired Famous Players' share of C/FP Distribution. To keep the same initials, the company was renamed Cinepix Film Properties. When the partnership with Toronto-based Famous Players was disbanded in 1994, a company called First Ontario Film Distributors was spun off from CFP by Sackman to keep taking advantage of Ontario subsidies. The company also shot on the West Coast, as with the two Bounty Hunters movies, made in cooperation with CineVu Films, a Vancouver company co-founded in 1991 by Barmash and Snake Eater director George Erschbamer.

=== U.S. return and art films ===
In 1995, Dunning and Link opened a New York City office. Michael Paseornek, a New York writer turned executive, was tasked with setting it up in the new position of VP of U.S. operations. The site was home to a new U.S. production unit, CFP Productions, headed by Paseornek himself, assisted by Lauren McLaughlin and Ernie Barbarash. Its project portfolio largely consisted of character pieces that followed the direction of contemporary independent cinema, rather than the high concept exploitation that had been Dunning's bread and butter. A 1997 article named CFP as the only Canadian film producer with a permanent U.S. office.

It also housed CFP Distribution, the company's new U.S. theatrical division. It was originally managed by Adam Rogers, a former Miramax executive who had consulted with C/FP since 1991. Its first release was Ang Lee's Pushing Hands. CFP Distribution added a West Coast unit in 1996. Former Hemdale executive Tom Ortenberg was the company's first SoCal staffer, briefly working from his own home before offices were set up in Santa Monica. He was credited for much of the company's U.S. growth. Its output featured some of the top independent films of the time, including multiple Sundance winners, as well as product deemed too edgy by more established indies like Miramax.

Meanwhile, Canadian operations were also reorganized to account for CFP's ambitions. The company acquired a majority stake in CinéGroupe, an internationally recognized Montreal-based animation studio, and launched CFP International, a new sales division based out of the same city and headed by former Malofilm executive Marie-Claude Poulin. In 1997, signalling its reorientation towards the U.S. market, CFP outsourced its Canadian video distribution to Columbia TriStar Home Video, and its Canadian theatrical bookings to Cineplex Odeon. That year, its final one as an independent entity, CFP had revenues of CAD$58 million.

=== Sale and rebrand as Lions Gate Films ===
In 1996, CFP raised CAD$10 million by selling 35 percent of its shares to three investment firms, with an eye towards furthering the growth of its U.S. theatrical business. This move was presented as a prelude to a public offering in 1997. It was instead announced in the summer of 1997 that Cinépix's principals—in addition to Link and Dunning, Sackman and Larouche owned 10 percent—had sold their remaining shares for CAD$36 million to financier Frank Giustra. The company officially became Lions Gate Films on January 12, 1998, while its CFP Distribution unit was rebranded as Lions Gate Releasing. Together with Vancouver's North Shore Studios and Los Angeles' Mandalay Television, LGF became one of the three main divisions of Giustra's new Lionsgate Entertainment. Just before the name change, Mark Urman replaced Rogers as president of U.S distribution. Sackman was appointed president of Lions Gate Films Corporation, the Canadian subsidiary of Lions Gate Entertainment that replaced CFP, while Dunning and Link respectively became chairman and CEO. However, a Francophone branch managed by Christian Larouche, Les Films Cinépix, kept the Cinépix brand alive until early 2001, when Larouche reorganized it as Christal Films Productions.

The original Cinépix Inc. entity remains in control of the Dunning estate. It is primarily used by Greg Dunning, the son of John Dunning (who passed in 2011), to curate the company's archive and promote the John Dunning Foundation, which commemorates his father's legacy and presents the John Dunning Best First Feature Award in association with the Academy of Canadian Cinema & Television.

== Sister companies ==
=== Cinema International Canada / CIC Video ===
A sister company of Cinépix overseeing Link and Dunning's operation of several cinemas, including two chains called the Midi Minuit (for Francophones) and the Eve (for Anglophones), as well as an eponymous theatrical distribution label. It also branched out into home video under the CIC and CIC Video names. Not to be confused with Cinema International Corporation, a joint venture between Paramount and Universal, which had its own CIC Video division.

=== DAL Productions ===
A sister company focused on production rather than distribution, whose initials simply stood for "Dunning And Link." In 1981, it was one of nine companies that left the longstanding Canadian Association of Motion Picture Producers and Quebec Film Producers Association to start the dissident Association of Canadian Movie Production Companies.

=== Avalanche Releasing / Avalanche Home Entertainment ===
In the final year before the Lionsgate transition, CFP established a sublabel called Avalanche Releasing for theatrical and Avalanche Home Entertainment for video. Those were kept in operation under Lions Gate.

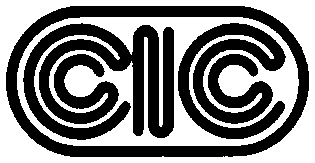
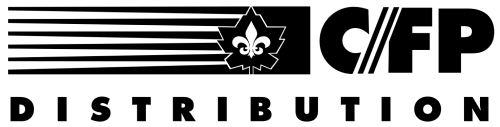
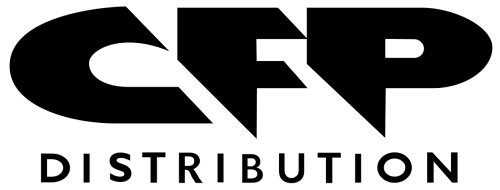
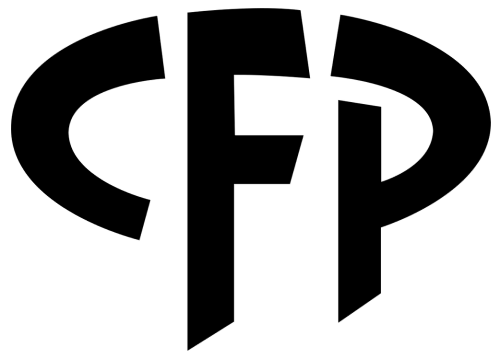
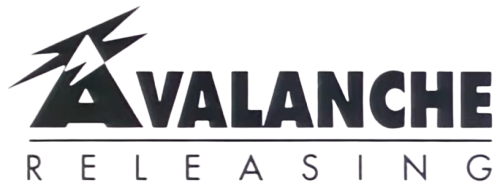
Some alternate lettermarks used by Cinépix and its affiliates over the years. From left to right: Cinema International Canada, C/FP Distribution (1989–94),
CFP (1994), CFP Distribution (1994–96), Cinepix Film Properties (1996–98), Avalanche Releasing

== Filmography ==
=== Films produced ===
Year	Title	Notes
1969	Valérie	French-language film
1970	Here and Now	French-language film First color production Released in the U.S. as Roommates
1970	Love in a Four Letter World	With Multivision; First English-language production
1970	Virgin Lovers	French-language film Also known as The Awakening
1971	Heads or Tails	French-language film With Productions Nouvelle France
1971	Foxy Lady	With Ivan Reitman Productions
1971	Loving and Laughing	Released in the U.S. under original title as well as Getting High, Getting Off and Turning On
1972	The Possession of Virginia	Also known as Satan's Sabbath
1973	Oh, If Only My Monk Would Want (Ah! Si mon moine voulait...)	French-language film Also known as Joyeux compères and L'heptaméron; With Citel and Pierson Productions
1973	Keep It in the Family	Via DAL Productions; With Kit Film Productions; Released in the U.S. as Love Brats
1973	Across This Land with Stompin' Tom Connors	Concert film With Kit Film Productions
1973	U-Turn	With George Kaczender Productions; Also known as The Girl in Blue; Opening film – 23rd Berlin International Film Festival
1974	The Apple, the Stem and the Seeds (La pomme, la queue et les pépins)	French-language film
1975	Ilsa, She Wolf of the SS	
1975	A Woman Inflamed (Tout feu, tout femme)	French-language film With United Theatres
1975	The Mystery of the Million Dollar Hockey Puck	Via DAL Productions; Also known as Pee Wee
1975	The Parasite Murders	Released in most Canadian provinces as Shivers; Released in the U.S. as They Came from Within
1976	Death Weekend	Via DAL Productions; Released in the U.S. as The House by the Lake
1976	Ilsa, Harem Keeper of the Oil Sheiks	
1977	Ilsa, the Tigress of Siberia	Also known as The Tigress
1977	Rabid	Via DAL Productions; With Cinema Entertainment Enterprises and Dibar Syndicate
1978	Blackout	Via DAL Productions; With Productions Agora and Maki Films
1979	Meatballs	Via DAL Productions; 1980 Golden Reel winner
1980	Hot Dogs	Via DAL Productions; With Rose Films; Also known as Hot Dog Cops, The Clean-up Squad and Under the Cover Cops; Released in the U.S. as Cops and Other Lovers
1981	Happy Birthday to Me	Via DAL Productions; With Famous Players
1981	My Bloody Valentine	Via DAL Productions
1981	Yesterday	Via DAL Productions; Also known as Gabrielle and Scoring; Released in the U.S. as This Time Forever
1983	Spacehunter: Adventures in the Forbidden Zone	With Columbia Pictures
1984	The Surrogate	With Télé-Métropole International
1985	Junior	
1986	The Vindicator	With 20th Century Fox and Michael Levy Enterprises; Also known as Frankenstein '88
1987	Making It... Safe	Sex education video
1987	Meatballs III	Via Dalco Productions
1988	Heavy Metal Summer	With ITC Entertainment; Released internationally in a different cut called State Park
1989	Snake Eater	With Carota Films
1990	Princes in Exile	With NFB and CBC; Best feature – 31st Monte Carlo Television Festival
1990	Whispers	With ITC Entertainment; Also known as Dean Koontz's Whispers
1991	Snake Eater II: The Drug Buster	
1992	Snake Eater III: His Law	
1994	Ski School 2	With Active Entertainment
1995	Bullet to Beijing	With Lenfilm
1995	Ski Hard: The Movie	Released in the U.S. as Downhill Willie; Also known as Ski Nuts
1996	The Ex	With American World Pictures
1996	Mask of Death	With Moonstone Entertainment
1996	Midnight in Saint Petersburg	With Lenfilm
1996	Bounty Hunters	With Moonstone Entertainment and CineVu Films
1996	Vibrations	With Tanglewood Films
1996	Hawk's Vengeance	
1996	The Ideal Man	French-language film With Quatrième Vague
1997	Bounty Hunters 2: Hardball	With Moonstone Entertainment and CineVu Films
1997	Stag	With Rampage Entertainment
1997	The Haven	French-language film Also known as The Caretaker's Lodge
1997	The Heist	Also known as Hostile Force; With Shavick Entertainment and ProSieben
1997	The Kid	With Melenny Productions
1998	The Incredible Adventures of Marco Polo	With SFG Film Group
1998	Buffalo '66	With Muse Productions
1998	Johnny Skidmarks	
1999	Elvis Gratton II: Miracle in Memphis	French-language film As Les Films Cinépix; With ACPAV
2000	The Bottle	French-language film As Les Films Cinépix; With Yul Films
Started development as Cinépix Film Properties / Released as Lionsgate Films
1998	Dog Park	With Accent Entertainment
1998	Hi-Life	With Gun for Hire Films
1998	Jerry and Tom	
1998	I'm Losing You	
1998	Vig	Also known as Money Kings
1999	The First 9½ Weeks	With Barnholtz Entertainment and Carousel Picture Company
Started development as Les Films Cinépix / Released as Christal Films Productions
2002	The Collector	French-language film

=== Select films distributed ===
Note: This list excludes self-produced films. Canadian distributor unless otherwise noted.

Year	Title	Production company	Notes	Refs.
1967	Belle de jour	Paris-Film Production, Five Film	Quebec only during original run Also Canada-wide reissue in 1979	
1969	Z	Réganne Films, ONCIC		
1970	Lorna	Eve Productions		
1970	The Unfaithful Wife	Les Films La Boétie, Cinegai	Via Allied Artists	
1971	The Anonymous Venetian	Ultra Films	Via Allied Artists	
1971	Trafic	Les Films Corona, Les Films Gibé, Selenia Cinematografica		
1972	Wedding in White	Dermet Productions		
1973	Cabaret	ABC Pictures International	Via Allied Artists	
1973	Kamouraska	Les Productions Carle-Lamy, France Cinéma Productions, Parc Film		
1973	The Pyx	Host Productions		
1973	Réjeanne Padovani	Cinak		
1976	The Twelve Tasks of Asterix	Dargaud Films, Les Productions René Goscinny, Studios Idéfix	French language only	
1977	The Margin	Paris-Film Production	Also known as The Edge	
1978	Violette Nozière	Filmel, FR3, Cinévidéo		
1980	The Coffin Affair	Les Films Ciné Scène, Les Productions Vidéofilms, United Theatres, et al.	International sales only	
1980	Despair	Geria Film, Bavaria Studios, SFP	French version only	
1984	The Twin	Fidéline Films, Les Productions La Guéville	Through Cinema International Canada; With Les Films René Malo	
1986	The Quiet Earth	Cinepro, Pillsbury Films	Through Cinema International Canada; Quebec only	
1988	Buster	The Movie Group, Vestron Pictures	Quebec only	
1989	All Dogs Go to Heaven	Goldcrest Films, Sullivan Bluth Studios	Via MGM/UA	
1990	Cyrano de Bergerac	Hachette Première, Camera One, Films A2, et al.		
1990	Metropolitan	Westerly Films	Quebec only	
1990	King of New York	Reteitalia, Scena International	Via Seven Arts	
1991	Lionheart	Imperial Entertainment		
1992	Indochine	Paradis Films, Générale d'Image, BAC Films, et al.	French version only	
1992	Reservoir Dogs	Live America	Via Miramax Films	
1993	Farewell My Concubine	Beijing Film Studio, China Film Co-Production Corporation, Tomson Films	Via Miramax Films	
1993	The Piano	Jan Chapman Productions, CiBy 2000	Via Miramax Films	
1993	The Visitors	Gaumont	French language only	
1993	The Crying Game	Palace Pictures, Channel Four Films, EuroTrustees, et al.	Via Miramax Films	
1993	Jamón jamón	Lola Films		
1993	Strictly Ballroom	M&A Productions	Via Miramax Films	
1994	The Crow	Miramax Films		
1994	Little Buddha	CiBy 2000, Recorded Picture Company	Via Miramax Films	
1994	Faraway, So Close	Road Movies, Tobis Filmkunst	Via Sony Pictures Classics	
1994	Belle Époque	Fernando Trueba P.C., Lola Films, Animatógrafo, et al.	Via Sony Pictures Classics	
1994	October	ACPAV		
1995	Angel Baby	Australian Film Finance Corporation, Stamen Films, Meridian Films	Also U.S. distributor	
1995	The Basketball Diaries	Island Pictures	Via New Line Cinema	
1995	The Monster	Melampo Cinematografica, Iris Films, UGC Images, et al.	Also U.S. distributor	
1995	Little Indian, Big City	Ice Films, TF1 Film Productions, Canal+	French version only	
1995	Les Misérables	TF1 Film Productions, Les Films 13, Canal +	French version only	
1995	Queen Margot	Renn Productions, NEF Filmproduktion, RCS Films & TV, et al.	French version only	
1995	Ulysses' Gaze	Paradis Films, Basic Cinematografica, Theo Angelopoulos, et al.	Quebec only	
1996	Antonia's Line	Bergen, Prime Time, Bard Entertainments, et al.		
1996	Cyclo	Les Productions Lazennec, Lumière, La Sept Cinema, et al.	Also U.S. distributor	
1996	Heavy	Available Light Productions	Also U.S. distributor	
1996	The Daytrippers	Nancy Tenenbaum Films	Also U.S. distributor	
1996	Hype	Helvey-Pray Productions	Also U.S. distributor	
1997	Another 9½ Weeks	Jones Film, Saga Pictures	Also known as Love in Paris	
1997	Sick: The Life and Death of Bob Flanagan, Supermasochist	Kirby Dick	Also U.S. distributor	
1997	I Love You, I Love You Not	Polar Entertainment, Die Hauskunst & Rimb, The Shooting Gallery, et al.	U.S. distributor only	
1997	The Pillow Book	Kasander & Wigman Productions, Alpha Films, Woodline Films, et al.	Also U.S. distributor	
1997	Sunday	Goatworks Films, Double A Films	Also U.S. distributor	
1997	The Return of the Texas Chainsaw Massacre	Ultra Muchos, River City Films	Also U.S. distributor Also known as Texas Chainsaw Massacre: The Next Generation	
1998	Love and Death on Long Island	Skyline Films, Imagex, BBC Films et al.	Also U.S. distributor Branded as both CFP and Lions Gate Films	

== Accolades ==
In 1993, Dunning and Link were presented with a special Genie Award for career contributions to Canadian cinema. In 1999, they received a special Grand Prix des Amériques at the Montreal World Film Festival, and were joined by director Denis Héroux for a presentation of a new print of Valérie. Canadian film trade magazine Playback also inducted the pair into their Hall of Fame in 2007. In 2008, the Quebec Cinematheque hosted a homage to Cinépix in the form of a cycle of seven screenings ranging from Valérie to The Ideal Man. In 2011, Montreal's Fantasia festival hosted a Cinépix tribute in presence of Link, Dunning, Heroux and Shivers leading woman Lynn Lowry. In 2024, Fantasia awarded its Denis Héroux Prize for contributions to the development of Canadian cinema to Dunning and Link. The event was accompanied by a screening of Snake Eater.
