= Snake Eater III: His Law =

1992 film by George Erschbamer

- Official DVD cover
- Directed by: George Erschbamer
- Written by: John Dunning; W. Glenn Duncan (original novel)
- Produced by: John Dunning; Irene Litinsky; André Link (executive)
- Starring: Lorenzo Lamas; Minor Mustain; Tracey Cook; Scott "Bam Bam" Bigelow
- Cinematography: Jacques Fortier
- Edited by: Jacques Jean
- Music by: Tim Broughton; John Massari
- Production company: Cinépix
- Distributed by: Cinépix/Famous Players (Canada); Paramount Pictures (U.S.)
- Release dates: August 21, 1992 (Canada); October 7, 1992 (United States)
- Running time: 91 minutes
- Country: Canada
- Language: English
- Budget: CAD$4,200,000

Snake Eater III: His Law is a 1992 crime action film directed by George Erschbamer, starring Lorenzo Lamas, Minor Mustain, Tracey Cook and Scott "Bam Bam" Bigelow. It is the third installment of the Snake Eater film series, after 1989's Snake Eater and 1991's Snake Eater II: The Drug Buster. Lamas, in his last series appearance, returns as Vietnam veteran Jack "Soldier" Kelly, who attempts to save a dropout student from sex trafficking biker gangs.

== Plot ==
Jack "Soldier" Kelly received a phone call from the Molisons, a couple who heard about him on the news. They tell him of their daughter Vivian, who approached a biker gang called Hell's Fury to prepare her college thesis, and ended up being groomed by them into a life of sexual servitude. Kelly enlists the help of an old friend, fellow biker turned private investigator, "Cowboy". They get information about the gang from a stripper named Fran, the ex-girlfriend of a prominent Hell's Fury henchman, the brutal "Goose". In exchange, Soldier arranges for her to room with his own girlfriend Hildy for protection. Kelly forces "Goose" to talk, only for him to reveal that Vivian has already been sold into slavery to another gang, the Outlaws.

Aware that his ex has snitched on him, Goose manages to find her whereabouts and travels to her new residence, where he kills her. In retaliation, the crafty Kelly sneaks into Goose's house and rigs his toilet so that his gets electrocuted via his urine stream when he relieves himself. A confrontation ensues with the rest of Hell's Fury and their leader Turk, who are defeated, leaving Soldier and Cowboy to go after the Outlaws. Soldier modifies a truck with a snowplow blade and, although vastly outnumbered, they launch their final assault on the group's headquarters.

== Cast ==
- Lorenzo Lamas as Officer Jack "Soldier" Kelly
- Minor Mustain as "Cowboy"
- Tracey Cook as Hildy Gardener (credited as Tracy Cook)
- Scott "Bam Bam" Bigelow as "Goose"
- Tracey Hway as Vivian Molison (credited as Tracy Hway)
- Chip Chuipka as "Turk"
- Una Kay as Marge Molison
- Gordon Atkinson as George Molison
- Holly Chester as Fran
- Walker Boone as Lieutenant Durkee
- Chris Benson as T.J. McCready
- Eliza Berry as Connie

== Production ==
Franchise owners Cinépix opened negotiations with Lamas for a third Snake Eater at the same time they exercised their option for the second film in late 1988. However, the actor had to wait much longer than he expected for it to get made, likely due to the judicial battle that delayed the release of the first sequel.

Snake Eater III originated as an adaptation of Rafferty's Rules, the first book in the Rafferty series of crime novels by Australian-based American author W. Glenn Duncan, whose rights had been acquired from Duncan's literary agency Curtis Brown. Duncan had no involvement after that, as he harbored no illusion of maintaining creative control against the film production machine, and saw the sale purely as a money play. The script was later reworked into a "Soldier" Kelly adventure, although most other characters remain and Duncan's estate found that the screenplay stuck reasonably close to its inspiration.

This was the feature debut of actress Tracey Cook, who went on to greater acclaim on television. Cook later remembered the picture as "pretty poorly done, but hey, it was fun", adding that although it featured her only on-screen nudity to date, "actually it was quite a respectable role, and I still don't have a problem with it". Similar to the first movie's inclusion of celebrities Ronnie Hawkins and Larry Csonka in supporting roles, professional wrestler Scott "Bam Bam" Bigelow was added as a bit of novelty casting. Filming was scheduled to start on August 26, 1991, and stretched into late September. Like the previous sequel, it was shot in Montreal, Quebec, the historic home of production company Cinepix. The budget was estimated at CAD$4,200,000, the highest in the series.

== Release ==
=== Pre-release ===
The film was screened for industry professionals at the 1992 American Film Market on March 3, 1992, in association with Moviestore Entertainment, an U.S. independent that frequently dealt with Canadian producers. According to producer John Dunning, Snake Eater III was the first Canadian picture sold for general release in China. Paramount Pictures, which acquired the film's U.S. video rights, projected sales of 20–22,000 units.

=== Theatrical ===
In Canada, Snake Eater III debuted in Cinépix's hometown of Montreal on August 21, 1992, both in an English version and a French version named L'Indomptable III: Sa Loi (lit. 'The Untameable III: His Law'). It was later seen in the capital of Ottawa starting on September 18, 1992, also via Cinépix/Famous Players Distribution.

=== Home media ===
Snake Eater III was released on in Canada and the U.S. on October 7, 1992. As with the previous sequel, the tape was distributed by Cinépix sister company C/FP Video in Canada, and by Paramount Home Video in the U.S.

== Reception ==
=== Critical response ===
Scripps Howard columnist Mike Pearson, who had called the original a "guilty pleasure", took a much sterner stance towards the third installment, writing: "I'm trying to figure out if the people who made Snake Eater III are brain damaged, or if that's their target audience". He deemed the film "mindlessly violent and shamelessly stupid." The Motion Picture Annual wrote that "[t]he law of diminishing returns is clearly in evidence in this third installment of the Canadian-made Snake Eater series" and, despite is being adapted from novel, complained that "the film has so little plot that Vivian runs away twice", and that the film's motel setpiece seemed lifted from a similar one in Near Dark. British reviewer John Elliott's Guide to Home Entertainment deemed it "[a]nother assembly-line tale, full of bloodshed, violence and fury".

Commenting on the wider video release, The Canadian Press' Christopher Johnston assessed that the film delivers "exactly what renters expect", advising that "[t]he fight scenes are not for the squeamish, but viewers will find some welcome comic relief." The exploitation-friendly Joe Bob Report, whose publisher Joe Bob Briggs featured the series several times on his Drive-in Theater show, was again one of the film's few apologists. Although one member of the newsletter's review committee called the film a "predictable, low-budget Dirty Harry-type film", the majority found it to be a "better than average" sequel and the "best Snake Eater yet" with "good pace, interesting plot, humor". However, the "very weak" sidekick played by Minor Mustain was widely criticized.

== Spin-off ==
Cinépix expressed interest in re-hiring Lamas for a fourth Snake Eater picture, but following his rise to mainstream stardom with the TV series Renegade, his contractual demands became too high for the Canadian company. Dunning felt that Reno Raines, Lamas' character on Renegade was derivative of Jack "Soldier" Kelly, although Lamas' interest in biker culture predated the creation of either. Hawk's Vengeance, a spin-off film where the character of Jack Kelly—briefly played by Canadian actor Pierre Gendron—gets murdered, was released in 1996. Erschbamer and Lamas went on to re-team on Final Round, which was made in collaboration with longtime production partner Mike Erwin.
