= Lionsgate Films =

Canadian-American film production and distribution company

- Logo used since 2005
- Formerly: Cinépix Film Properties (1962–1998); Lions Gate Films (1998–2005)
- Type: Division
- Industry: Film
- Founded: June 15, 1962; 64 years ago (as Cinépix); January 13, 1998; 28 years ago (as Lionsgate Films)
- Founders: John Dunning; Andre Link; Frank Giustra
- Headquarters: Santa Monica, California, U.S.
- Area served: Worldwide
- Key people: Joe Drake; (film group chairman); Adam Fogelson; (vice chair)
- Products: Motion pictures
- Services: Film distribution
- Parent: Lionsgate (1997–2024); Lionsgate Studios (2024–present)
- Divisions: Lionsgate Premiere
- Subsidiaries: eOne Films; Lionsgate UK; Globalgate Entertainment; Grindstone Entertainment Group; Pantelion Films (50%); Roadside Attractions (43%); Summit Entertainment; Spyglass Media Group (18.9%); Good Universe; Makeready (co-backing with Universal Studios); Sierra/Affinity
- Website: www.lionsgate.com/movies/

Lionsgate Films, previously spelled as Lions Gate and formerly known as Cinépix Film Properties, is a Canadian-American film production and distribution company founded in Montreal, Quebec, Canada, on June 15, 1962. Headquartered in Santa Monica, California, it is owned by Lionsgate Studios since May 14, 2024.

Lionsgate is the second-largest and most successful mini-major film studio in North America. The studio focuses on foreign and independent films and has distributed various commercially successful film franchises, including Saw, The Hunger Games, Rambo, Divergent, The Punisher, John Wick, Madea, Blair Witch, Now You See Me, Hostel, The Expendables, Sinister, The Twilight Saga, Step Up, and Den of Thieves.

== History ==
=== As Cinépix ===
Cinépix was founded by John Dunning and Andre Link in 1962. Cinépix, based in Montreal, was a Canadian independent motion picture company that released English- and French-language films in Canada and the United States.

Initially a distribution company, Cinépix's first production was the 1969 erotic drama Valérie, which earned $1 million at the box office. Cinépix produced early work by David Cronenberg (Shivers) and Ivan Reitman (Meatballs). The company also distributed art-house films including the grunge rock documentary Hype, Vincent Gallo's Buffalo '66, and SICK: The Life & Death of Bob Flanagan, Supermasochist.

Cronenberg stated that "Cinépix was the Canadian version of Roger Corman" and "in a way they were modelling themselves after him and also some European producers as well".

From 1989 to 1994, Cinépix was partnered with Famous Players in C/FP Distribution, which was renamed Cinépix Film Properties (C/FP). In 1994, Cinépix bought Famous Players' stake in the organization.

By 1997, Cinépix had a New York–based American distribution arm and owned 56 percent of Ciné-Groupe, an animated film production company based in Montreal.

=== As Lionsgate Films ===
Lions Gate Entertainment Corporation (LGEC) was formed in 1997 by Frank Giustra, a banker. LGEC purchased Cinépix and kept its leadership. Cinépix was renamed Lions Gate Films on January 13, 1998. LGEC also purchased the Vancouver-based North Shore Studios, which became Lions Gate Studios. In June 1998, LGE purchased International Movie Group, whose film library included Jean-Claude Van Damme's Kickboxer.

Lions Gate's first major box office success was American Psycho in 2000, which began a trend of producing and distributing films too controversial for the major film studios. Other notable films included Affliction (1998), Gods and Monsters (1998), Dogma (1999), O (2001), Cube 2: Hypercube (2002), Open Water (2003), Saw (2004), The Punisher (2004) and the Michael Moore documentary Fahrenheit 9/11 (2004), which had been the studio's highest-grossing film until the release of The Hunger Games in 2012.

Giustra left the firm in 2000. That same year, Jon Feltheimer became CEO and Michael Burns became vice chairman. They decided to focus on the profits of videos and DVDs and began buying struggling firms that controlled large libraries. The two most notable acquisitions were Trimark Holdings (650 titles) in 2000 and Artisan Entertainment in 2003. The Trimark purchase also included CinemaNow, a broadband streaming website, where Lionsgate could feature its own movies. These two purchases along with others gave Lions Gate a large home entertainment library, which includes Total Recall, Reservoir Dogs, Terminator 2: Judgment Day, Young Guns, Dirty Dancing and Apocalypse Now, in some cases via output deals with StudioCanal, American Zoetrope, and Miramax (most of them the result of prior licensing deals with Lions Gate's home video predecessor Artisan).

Lions Gate occasionally co-produces films with major studios. For example, Lions Gate teamed with Miramax Films for the 2004 sequel Dirty Dancing: Havana Nights and with Paramount Pictures for 2002's Narc and 2004's The Prince & Me which was given a studio credit. Lions Gate was also a silent partner in 20th Century Fox's 2004 sci-fi film The Day After Tomorrow. Also in 2004, Lions Gate joined forces with United Artists in producing Hotel Rwanda. Media Capital Technologies was Lionsgate's main co-financing partner from 2023 to 2025.

==== Further acquisitions ====
On August 1, 2005, Lions Gate Entertainment Corp acquired the entire library of Modern Entertainment. On October 17, 2005, Lionsgate acquired Redbus Film Distribution for $35 million and became Lionsgate UK on February 23, 2006. Following this, Zygi Kamasa, who co-founded Redbus with Simon Franks, became CEO of Lionsgate UK and Europe.

In 2006, Lions Gate Studios was acquired by Bosa Developments, and later reverted to its original North Shore name.

In 2007, Joe Drake became Lionsgate's co-COO and motion picture group president. Lionsgate cut back its annual production by four in February 2009. As a response, the company signed a deal with Relativity Media where Relativity would finance films with Lionsgate.

The Hunger Games grossed $68.3 million when it premiered at the US box office on March 23, 2012. At the time, it was the best opening day ever for a non-sequel and the fifth highest of all time. Of that total, $19.7 million was earned via Thursday midnight screenings. In its first weekend, The Hunger Games grossed $152.5 million, making it Lionsgate's highest-grossing film after just three days.

On January 13, 2012, Lions Gate Entertainment Corp acquired Summit Entertainment, the studio behind the Twilight and Step Up series for $412.5 million. On May 3, 2012, Lionsgate Films made an agreement with CodeBlack Enterprises' CEO Jeff Clanagan to create CodeBlack Films, based at Lionsgate. Drake left in 2012 to found Good Universe.

On January 16, 2013, Lionsgate announced a low-budget film division to be led by John Sacchi. The division would release films under $2.5 million. Sacchi recently looked to acquire such films as Rock Bottom Creek (2012) and other independently made films as well.

On November 22, 2013, Lions Gate released The Hunger Games: Catching Fire. In its opening weekend, the movie grossed $158 million at the US box office, surpassing its predecessor, which generated $150 million in its opening weekend. The film had a budget of $130 million, breaking even soon after its opening, and making it profitable. Critics highly praised the film; it received a Rotten Tomatoes rating of 89%. The third Hunger Games film, Mockingjay- Part 1, was released in 2014. The final film, Mockingjay - Part 2, was released in 2015.

On April 1, 2015, according to Deadline, Lions Gate announced it has created its new label, Lionsgate Premiere. This new label will handle up to 15 releases a year, targeting young audiences at theaters and digital outlets. The new label, part of the company's diversification effort, will incorporate Lionsgate and Summit Entertainment titles and then specialize in "innovative multiplatform and other release strategies" to reach "affinity audiences with branded content and targeted marketing." Marketing and Research SVP Jean McDowell will handle marketing, with distribution to be run by Adam Sorensen, who currently manages Western Sales.

On May 2, 2016, according to Deadline Hollywood, Lions Gate announced it has teaming with eight international companies to launch the GlobalGate Entertainment consortium. GlobalGate will produce and distribute local-language films in markets around the world. Lionsgate said Monday it has partnered with international entertainment executives Paul Presburger, William Pfeiffer and Clifford Werber to launch GlobalGate.

Drake returned in October 2017 as Lionsgate's film group chairman. The company laid off staff for theatrical marketing and publicity in its New York office, and moved to end its participation as a partner in CodeBlack Films in January 2019. The cut backs were due to the failures of Robin Hood, and the comedy The Spy Who Dumped Me. In June 2019, Hulu and FX picked up show rights to Lionsgate films released in 2020 and 2021.

In mid-2019, Lionsgate bid for a 49% stake in Miramax from Qatari company beIN Media Group. This would have given Lionsgate worldwide distribution rights to the studio's 700 film library, as well as the rights to create future films based on Miramax properties. Lionsgate were considered a strong contender due to their familiarity with the Miramax library from previous temporary distribution deals. However, in September 2019, it was announced that Lionsgate had dropped out of the bidding, with the 49% Miramax stake eventually going to ViacomCBS (now known as Paramount Skydance), who paid $375 million for it.

In 2022, Adam Fogelson joined the Motion Picture Group as vice chair, after leaving STX Entertainment, reporting to Drake.

=== Post-spin-off ===
In December 2023, Lionsgate closed its acquisition of Entertainment One (now Lionsgate Canada), another Canadian-founded studio business. In Spring 2024, Lionsgate's film and studio businesses (including Lionsgate Films) was spun-off into the newly formed Lionsgate Studios.

On June 17, 2024, it was announced that Lionsgate will distribute Francis Ford Coppola's independently made $120 million sci-fi epic Megalopolis in North America (albeit without a marketing deal) after almost every distribution company in the United States declined due to its unconventional storytelling being difficult to promote, with a release date for the film set on September 27, 2024. Lionsgate had previously partnered with Coppola for the re-releases of his past films such as The Conversation (1974), Apocalypse Now (1979), One from the Heart (1982) and The Cotton Club (1984).

In 2026, Lionsgate acquired a stake in the generative AI company Runway. Michael Burns stated publicly that this deal and artificial intelligence will save the company "tens and tens of millions of dollars a year".

== Film library ==
=== Film series ===
Title	Release date	No. Films	Notes
Les Boys	1997–98	2	Distribution only
American Psycho	2000–02	2	
Cube	2002–04	2	Acquired from Trimark Pictures
Leprechaun	2003–present	3	Acquired from Trimark Pictures
Saw	2004–present	10	
The Punisher	2004–08	2	Co-production with Valhalla Entertainment and Marvel Entertainment
Hostel	2005–07	2	Co-production with Screen Gems
Madea	2005–19	11	Co-production with Tyler Perry Studios
Marvel Animated Features	2006–11	8	Co-production with Marvel Entertainment and Marvel Animation
Happily N'Ever After	2007–09	2	
Why Did I Get Married?	2007–10	2	Co-production with Tyler Perry Studios
The Twilight Saga	2008–12	5	
Rambo	2008–19	2	
Alpha and Omega	2010–17	8	
The Expendables	2010–23	4	
The Hunger Games	2012–present	5	
Step Up	2012–20	3	Acquired from Summit Entertainment
Now You See Me	2013–present	3	
Escape Plan	2013–19	3	
John Wick	2014–present	5	First two installments released through Summit Entertainment
The Divergent Series	2014–16	3	
Sicario	2015–present	1 (2)	Co-distributed with Sony Pictures Releasing
Norm of the North	2016–20	4	
Rock Dog	2016–23	3	First installment released through Summit Premiere
The Hitman's Bodyguard	2017–21	2	
Den of Thieves	2018–present	2	Acquired from STX Entertainment
Greenland	2020–present	2	Acquired from STX Entertainment
Fall	2022-present	2	
Detective Knight	2022–23	3	

=== Highest-grossing films ===
Highest-grossing films in North America
Rank	Title	Year	Gross
1	The Hunger Games: Catching Fire	2013	$424,668,047
2	The Hunger Games	2012	$408,010,692
3	Michael^{1}	2026	$372,303,388
4	The Hunger Games: Mockingjay – Part 1	2014	$337,135,885
5	The Twilight Saga: Eclipse^{2}	2010	$300,531,751
6	The Twilight Saga: New Moon^{2}	2009	$297,816,253
7	The Twilight Saga: Breaking Dawn – Part 2^{2}	2012	$292,324,737
8	The Hunger Games: Mockingjay – Part 2	2015	$281,723,902
9	The Twilight Saga: Breaking Dawn – Part 1^{2}	2011	$281,287,133
10	Terminator 2: Judgment Day^{6}	1991	$205,881,154
11	Twilight^{2}	2008	$192,769,854
12	John Wick: Chapter 4	2023	$187,131,806
13	The Day After Tomorrow^{3}	2004	$186,740,799
14	Mr. & Mrs. Smith^{5}	2005	$186,336,279
15	John Wick: Chapter 3 – Parabellum	2019	$171,015,687
16	The Hunger Games: The Ballad of Songbirds & Snakes	2023	$166,350,594
17	Knives Out	2019	$165,359,751
18	La La Land^{2}	2016	$151,101,803
19	Divergent^{2}	2014	$150,947,895
20	Rambo: First Blood Part II^{6}	1985	$150,415,432
21	The Blair Witch Project^{4}	1999	$140,539,099
22	Wonder	2017	$132,422,809
23	The Divergent Series: Insurgent^{2}	2015	$130,179,072
24	The Housemaid	2025	$126,432,462
25	Total Recall^{6}	1990	$119,394,840

Highest-grossing films worldwide
Rank	Title	Year	Gross
1	Michael^{1}	2026	$1,021,426,595
2	The Hunger Games: Catching Fire	2013	$865,011,746
3	The Twilight Saga: Breaking Dawn – Part 2^{2}	2012	$848,593,948
4	The Hunger Games: Mockingjay – Part 1	2014	$759,159,711
5	The Twilight Saga: Breaking Dawn – Part 1^{2}	2011	$712,205,856
6	The Twilight Saga: New Moon^{2}	2009	$709,711,008
7	The Twilight Saga: Eclipse^{2}	2010	$698,491,347
8	The Hunger Games	2012	$695,220,619
9	The Hunger Games: Mockingjay – Part 2	2015	$661,456,867
10	The Day After Tomorrow^{3}	2004	$552,639,571
11	Terminator 2: Judgment Day^{6}	1991	$520,881,154
12	Mr. & Mrs. Smith^{5}	2005	$478,207,520
13	La La Land^{1}	2016	$471,991,358
14	John Wick: Chapter 4	2023	$440,157,245
15	Twilight^{2}	2008	$407,187,715
16	The Housemaid	2025	$400,028,500
17	Basic Instinct^{6}	1992	$352,927,224
18	Now You See Me^{2}	2013	$351,723,989
19	The Hunger Games: The Ballad of Songbirds & Snakes	2023	$337,371,917
20	Now You See Me 2^{2}	2016	$334,897,606
21	John Wick: Chapter 3 – Parabellum	2019	$328,349,908
22	Wonder	2017	$315,025,930
23	The Expendables 2	2012	$314,975,955
24	Knives Out	2019	$312,897,920
25	Rambo: First Blood Part II^{6}	1985	$300,400,432

== Notes ==
1. Lionsgate released Michael in North American distribution only, while Universal Pictures distributed the film internationally (excludes Japan and Russia)
2. Distributed under the Summit Entertainment banner
3. Studio credit only; released by 20th Century Fox
4. Distributed under the Artisan Entertainment banner
5. Studio credit only under the Summit Entertainment banner; released by 20th Century Fox
6. Distributed under the Carolco Pictures banner, originally distributed in theaters by TriStar Pictures

== Works cited ==
- Cronenberg, David (2006). David Cronenberg: Interviews with Serge Grünberg. Plexus Publishing. ISBN 0859653765.
