= Hawk's Vengeance =

1996 film by Marc F. Voizard

- Promotional release poster
- Directed by: Marc F. Voizard
- Written by: Jim Cirile (as Michael Ellis); John Maxwell
- Produced by: John Dunning; Alain Dahan (associate); André Link (executive); Jeff Sackman (executive)
- Starring: Gary Daniels; Jayne Heitmeyer; Cass Magda; George Chiang
- Cinematography: John Berrie
- Edited by: Mark Sanders
- Music by: Leon Aronson
- Production company: Cinépix Film Properties
- Distributed by: Cinépix/Famous Players (Canada); Dimension Films (U.S.)
- Release date: September 19, 1996
- Running time: 96 minutes
- Country: Canada
- Language: English
- Budget: CAD$2,400,000

Hawk's Vengeance is a 1996 Canadian action film directed by Marc F. Voizard, starring Gary Daniels, Jayne Heitmeyer, Cass Magda and George Chiang. A spin-off/sequel to Snake Eater III: His Law (1992) and the fourth installment of the Snake Eater film series, it introduces "Hawk" Kelly, the British-raised stepbrother of the previous films' "Soldier" Kelly, who investigates his sibling's mysterious death amidst a gang war between ethnic Chinese and white skinheads. The series' usual star Lorenzo Lamas does not appear, and his role is recast with another actor during a brief expository scene.

== Plot ==
Police officer Jack "Soldier" Kelly is lured by a skinhead into a back alley, where two other men ambush him. They gun down Soldier, then cover their tracks by eliminating the skinhead and putting the weapon of the crime in the latter's hand. When informed of the mysterious death, Jack's stepbrother, British Royal Marines lieutenant Eric "Hawk" Kelly, flies to the U.S. to seek answers. His brother's partner on the force, Detective Lizzie Hampton, tells him to stay out of it, but he does not heed her request and starts investigating on his own.

Hawk meets Lipo, a young member of the Ba Wang, an ethnic Chinese gang, who informs him that Soldier was killed while investigating a rival skinhead group, the Death Skulls. As part of the official investigation, Hampton is called to the morgue, where a badly mutilated body has been delivered: several organs are missing and she recognizes the Ba Wang's tattoo on one arm. Hawk kidnaps the leader of the Skulls and forces him to come clean about the hidden side of their activities, before killing him.

The Skulls work for Elias T. Garr, a former marine himself who was once stationed in Southeast Asia, and became a master in the martial art of kali. He has since become a ruthless kingpin, and turned to organ trafficking with the help of his two less-than-competent henchmen, "Blade" and Duquesne, and his underground surgeon Dr. Catherine Blythe. Garr uses the Skulls and their war against the Ba Wang to procure bodies for his racket. Much like his sibling, Hawk is skilled in the arts of subterfuge and weapon rigging, and starts whittling down Garr's crime syndicate. Meanwhile, Hampton has noticed Hawk's presence in the vicinity of the Skulls' headquarters, and after confronting him, joins his effort as the two grow feelings for each other.

== Cast ==
- Gary Daniels as Lieutenant Eric "Hawk" Kelly
- Jayne Heitmeyer as Lizzie
- Cass Magda as Garr
- George Chiang as Lipo
- Vlasta Vrana as Duquesne
- Charles Biddle Jr. as "Blade"
- Catherine Blythe as Dr. Rebecca Palmer
- Serge Houde as Lieutenant Durkee
- Arthur Holden as Dr. Sattler
- Johni Keyworth as Siegel
- Russell Yuen as Yoon
- Winston Wong as Liping
- Pierre Gendron as Jack "Soldier" Kelly
- John Topor as "Satan"

== Production ==
Hawk's Vengeance was the second actioner in quick succession for Quebec director Marc F. Voizard, who had made the Roddy Piper vehicle Marked Man over the summer, and previously specialized in dramatic television. Canadian co-star Cass Magda was a kali stick fighting instructor in real life, mirroring his character's fighting style in the film. The movie was made at a cost of CAD$2,400,000. As for the two prior sequels, filming took place in the region of Montreal, Quebec, Cinépix's historic home. The local press announced filming dates of October 23 through November 22, 1995, but other sources listed final dates of October 23 through November 27. One day before its projected conclusion, the shoot was disrupted by the theft of a 1.5-ton silent electric generator. The crew regrouped and finished the movie with a hastily procured standard generator, which was louder and made filming more difficult. The producers were dumbfounded by the theft of such an identifiable and unwieldy piece of equipment, a first in the Quebec film industry, and Voizard mentioned a rumor about the existence of a criminal ring that smuggled stolen film gear to South American pornographers.

== Release ==
=== Marketing ===
The film's sales were handled by Moonstone Entertainment. The company offered two poster arts to prospective customers, one where Daniels struck a martial arts pause, and another where he held a shotgun, to draw different segments of the audience. Miramax, which acquired the film for U.S. release, promoted it via a recurring quiz it ran in newspapers across the nation, offering free tapes to select winners. Martial artist Magda was given top billing alongside Daniels on the U.S. poster, which was not the case on the original.

=== Home media ===
In the U.S., the film was part of a batch of four Cinépix features picked up by Miramax around that time. It was released on VHS on October 21, 1997, via their genre label Dimension Home Video, with a LaserDisc following on November 5. The Canadian VHS arrived two weeks after its American counterpart from Cinépix sister company C/FP Video. The film was seen in Daniels' United Kingdom ahead of North America, debuting there in the fourth week of January 1997 via Entertainment in Video.

== Reception ==
=== Rentals ===
Hawk's Vengeance debuted at number 5 in the direct-to-video rental charts compiled by American trade magazine Video Business.

=== Critical response ===
As with previous installments of the Snake Eater franchise, reception has been largely negative. Writing for the Knight Ridder family of newspapers, Randy Myers thought that while "Daniels [was] good", Hawk's Vengeance displayed "all-time insipidness" and was "downright stupid". TLA Publications' Video and DVD Guide thought the star deserved better, opining: "Somebody give Gary Daniels a break! The handsome action star has talent, great martial arts ability and a likable screen persona, but he is continually cast in crappy grade-Z action flicks like this one." While acknowledging that "youthful members of the martial-arts crowd will probably appreciate the fight scenes", Alan Levine of The Arizona Republic was critical of Gary Daniels and Cass Magda's "bad acting" and the film's "predictable stereotypes".

Paul Cole of the Birmingham Evening Mail advised: "Watch Hawk's Vengeance strictly for kicks. Anything else, and you'll be thinking of putting this one in the microwave." Ballantine Books' DVD & Video Guide was indifferent, calling it a "run-of-the-mill action film". More positive was Gerard Fratley in his book A Century of Canadian Cinema; calling the film "not bad", he found it "interesting to see the criminal scene through the eyes of 'a copper' from 'over there'". The BBC's RadioTimes was perhaps most positive, calling it "another proficient straight-to-video thriller from Gary Daniels", but noted that he was "almost overshadowed by newcomer Cass Magda, who provides a masterclass in sword and stick fighting".
