= René Verzier =

Canadian cinematographer (1934–2024)

- Born: 1934; Casablanca, Morocco
- Died: January 1, 2024 (aged 89); Granby, Quebec, Canada
- Occupation: Cinematographer

René Verzier (1934 – January 1, 2024) was a Canadian cinematographer, who worked predominantly in the cinema of Quebec. He was most noted as a Genie Award nominee for Best Cinematography, receiving dual nods at the 8th Genie Awards in 1987 for his work on the films The Morning Man (Un matin, une vie) and Toby McTeague.

== Biography ==
Originally from Morocco, Verzier began his career as a photographer, notably serving as the official photographer for kings Mohammed V and Hassan II. After serving as a safari guide for a National Film Board of Canada crew that was in the country making a documentary, he emigrated to Canada in 1966 and worked on documentary films for the NFB before making his feature debut as the cinematographer on Denis Héroux's 1969 film Valérie. He worked regularly on the films of Héroux, Roger Fournier and Gilles Carle in the 1970s, and began working more frequently on English-language films, both theatrical and television films, in the late 1970s and 1980s.

Verzier died on January 1, 2024, at the age of 89.

== Filmography ==
=== Film ===
- Brahim (ou le collier de beignets) – 1957
- Un troubadour de Marrakech – 1961
- Les enfants du soleil – 1961
- Âmes et rythmes – 1962
- Retour aux sources (Arabic: الرجوع إلى الأصل) – 1963
- La peinture marocaine – 1964
- La Route des vacances – 1964
- Le Logis des hommes – 1964
- Les Chemins du Rif – 1967
- Gros Morne – 1967
- Valérie – 1969
- Here and Now (L'Initiation) – 1970
- Love in a Four Letter World – 1970
- The Awakening (L'Amour humain) – 1970
- Heads or Tails (Pile ou face) – 1971
- The Men (Les mâles) – 1971
- Seven Times a Day (7 fois...par jour) – 1971
- Hold on to Daddy's Ears (Tiens-toi bien après les oreilles à papa) – 1971
- The Possession of Virginia (Le diable est parmi nous) – 1972
- The Apparition (L'Apparition) – 1972
- The True Nature of Bernadette (La vraie nature de Bernadette) – 1972
- The Death of a Lumberjack (La Mort d'un bûcheron) – 1973
- The Pyx – 1973
- There's Always a Way to Find a Way (Y'a toujours moyen de moyenner!) – 1973
- I Love You (Je t'aime) – 1974
- By the Blood of Others (Par le sang des autres) – 1974
- Les aventures d'une jeune veuve – 1974
- Letters – 1975
- Mustang – 1975
- Jacques Brel Is Alive and Well and Living in Paris – 1975
- The Little Girl Who Lives Down the Lane – 1976
- Rabid – 1977
- Rituals – 1977
- High-Ballin' – 1978
- Two Solitudes – 1978
- Search and Destroy – 1979
- City on Fire – 1979
- Fish Hawk – 1979
- Death Ship – 1980
- Hog Wild – 1980
- Deadly Companion – 1980
- Gas – 1981
- Visiting Hours – 1982
- Deadly Eyes – 1982
- The Funny Farm – 1983
- Joy – 1983
- Of Unknown Origin – 1983
- Covergirl – 1983
- Cross Country – 1983
- One Night Only – 1984
- Toby McTeague – 1985
- Breaking All the Rules – 1985
- Perfect Timing – 1986
- The Vindicator – 1986
- Bullies – 1986
- The Morning Man (Un matin, une vie) – 1986
- Wild Thing – 1987
- Eddie and the Cruisers II: Eddie Lives! – 1989
- The Postmistress (La Postière) – 1992
- Le Zombi de Cap-Rouge – 1997
- Frozen with Fear – 2001
- My One Only Love (Je n'aime que toi) – 2004

=== Television ===
- Jo Gaillard – 1975
- The Newcomers: "1832" – 1978
- Reckless Disregard – 1985
- In Like Flynn – 1985
- Miles to Go – 1986
- After the Promise – 1987
- Shades of Love: Lilac Dream – 1987
- Shades of Love: The Rose Café – 1987
- Shades of Love: Sincerely, Violet – 1987
- Shades of Love: Champagne for Two – 1987
- Mount Royal: "The Ties That Bind" – 1988
- Liberace: Behind the Music – 1988
- No Blame – 1988
- Red Earth, White Earth – 1989
- The Penthouse – 1989
- Bordertown – 1989–1991
