= Here and Now (1970 film) =

- Poster for the 1970 theatrical release
- French: L'Initiation
- Directed by: Denis Héroux
- Written by: Yves Thériault
- Produced by: John Dunning
- Starring: Danielle Ouimet; Chantal Renaud; Celine Lomez; Louise Turcot; Jacques Riberolles; Gilles Chartrand
- Cinematography: René Verzier
- Edited by: Film House, Toronto, Ontario, Canada
- Music by: François Cousineau
- Production company: Cinépix
- Distributed by: CIC/CFP
- Release date: 29 January 1970
- Running time: 93 minutes
- Country: Canada
- Language: French
- Budget: $200,000
- Box office: $2.5 million

Here and Now (French: L'Initiation) is a 1970 French-Canadian film directed by Denis Héroux. The film is seen as a sequel to Valérie also directed by Héroux. The film has been called maple syrup porn. L’Initiation grossed more money than its predecessor, making it one of the highest-grossing Canadian films at the domestic box office.

== Plot ==
Victoire (Renaud), A University of Montreal student, has an affair with a famous French author and professor Gervais Messiandre (Riberolles) after being disappointed with her first sexual experience with her boyfriend, Pierre (Chartrand). While Victoire is having the affair with Gervais, Pierre is seeing Victoire's friend and roommate Nadine (Ouimet). Victorie and Gervais spend a couple of nights together in a hotel in Montreal but return to their lives shortly after.

== Production ==
Here and Now started filming in September 1969, and ended on October 18, with a budget of $200,000 (equivalent to $1,667,005 in 2025).

== Release ==
The film was released in Montreal on 29 January 1970, and grossed $2.5 million (equivalent to $20,221,675 in 2025). The film grossed $1,883,000 in Canada making it the second-highest-grossing film of all time in Canada, behind Claude Fournier's Deux femmes en or, also released in 1970, which grossed $2.5 million.

The film was entered in competition at the 22nd Canadian Film Awards in 1970, although Cinepix Film Properties, the film's studio, subsequently withdrew it and Love in a Four Letter World from the competition after an article in Time implied that the Canadian Film Award jury was unsympathetic to the films' sexual content.

== Works cited ==
- Turner, D. John, ed. (1987). Canadian Feature Film Index: 1913-1985. Canadian Film Institute. ISBN 0660533642.
- Melnyk, George (2004). One Hundred Years of Canadian Cinema. University of Toronto Press. ISBN 080203568X.
