= Captains Courageous (disambiguation) =

Captains Courageous is a novel by Rudyard Kipling.

Captains Courageous may also refer to various film adaptations of the novel:

- Captains Courageous (1937 film), starring Spencer Tracy and Freddie Bartholomew
- Captains Courageous (1977 film), featuring Karl Malden and Johnny Doran
- Captains Courageous (1996 film), starring Robert Urich and Kenny Vadas
