= Glen MacPherson =

Canadian cinematographer

- Born: October 29, 1957 (age 68); Montreal, Canada
- Occupation: Cinematographer
- Years active: 1977–present

Glen MacPherson, CSC/ASC (born October 29, 1957) is a Canadian cinematographer based in Los Angeles.

== Filmography ==
=== Film ===
Year	Title	Director
1989	Snake Eater	George Erschbamer
1989	Snake Eater II: The Drug Buster	George Erschbamer
1993	Cadillac Girls	Nicholas Kendall
1997	Regeneration	Gillies MacKinnon
1998	Wrongfully Accused	Pat Proft
1998	The Real Howard Spitz	Vadim Jean
2000	Romeo Must Die	Andrzej Bartkowiak
2001	Camouflage	James Keach
2001	Exit Wounds	Andrzej Bartkowiak
2002	All About the Benjamins	Kevin Bray
2002	Friday After Next	Marcus Raboy
2004	My Baby's Daddy	Cheryl Dunye
2004	Walking Tall	Kevin Bray
2005	Rebound	Steve Carr
2006	16 Blocks	Richard Donner
2007	Trick 'r Treat	Michael Dougherty
2008	One Missed Call	Eric Valette
2008	Rambo	Sylvester Stallone
2009	The Final Destination	David R. Ellis
2010	Resident Evil: Afterlife	Paul W. S. Anderson
2011	The Three Musketeers	Paul W. S. Anderson
2012	Resident Evil: Retribution	Paul W. S. Anderson
2014	Pompeii	Paul W. S. Anderson
2015	Momentum	Stephen Campanelli
2016	Resident Evil: The Final Chapter	Paul W. S. Anderson
2020	Monster Hunter	Paul W. S. Anderson
2025	In the Lost Lands	Paul W. S. Anderson

Documentary film

Year	Title	Director
1983	A 20th Century Chocolate Cake	Lois Siegel
1993	Lip Gloss	Lois Siegel
2011	Glee: The 3D Concert Movie	Kevin Tancharoen

=== Television ===
Year	Title	Director	Notes
1989	The Hitchhiker	Eric Till	Episode "Coach"
1989-1991	CBC's Magic Hour	Paul Shapiro; Brad Turner	Episodes "Rookies" and "The Prom"
1991	Conspiracy of Silence	Francis Mankiewicz	Part 1
1995	Sliders	Andy Tennant	Episode "Pilot"
2001	The Division	Robert Butler	Episode "The Pilot"
2010	Keep Your Head Up, Kid: The Don Cherry Story	Jeff Woolnough	Miniseries
2022	Thai Cave Rescue	Kevin Tancharoen; Nattawut Poonpiriya	5 episodes

TV movies

Year	Title	Director
1988	Betrayal of Silence	Jeff Woolnough
1989	The Rookies	Paul Shapiro
1990	Clarence	Eric Till
1991	Deadly Surveillance	Paul Ziller
1991	Deadly Betrayal: The Bruce Curtis Story	Graeme Campbell
1992	Miles from Nowhere	Buzz Kulik
1992	Wojeck: Out of the Fire	George Bloomfield
1993	The Amy Fisher Story	Andy Tennant
1993	Miracle on Interstate 880	Robert Iscove
1993	The Sea Wolf	Michael Anderson
1993	The Substitute	Martin Donovan
1993	Dying to Remember	Arthur Allan Seidelman
1994	For the Love of Aaron	John Kent Harrison
1994	Voices from Within	Eric Till
1995	Serving in Silence: The Margarethe Cammermeyer Story	Jeff Bleckner
1995	Johnny's Girl	John Kent Harrison
1995	Bye Bye Birdie	Gene Saks
1995	Shock Treatment	Michael Schultz
1996	Captains Courageous	Michael Anderson
1996	Doctor Who	Geoffrey Sax
1996	Calm at Sunset	Daniel Petrie
1996	Toe Tags	Daniel Petrie Jr.
1998	Max Q	Michael Shapiro
2003	Alaska	Kim Manners
2025	Silver Lake	Kevin Bray

== Awards and nominations ==
Year	Award	Category	Title	Result	Ref.
1997	Genie Awards	Best Cinematography	Regeneration	Nominated	
1998	Gemini Awards	Best Photography in a Dramatic Program or Series	Captains Courageous	Nominated	
2010	Gemini Awards	Best Photography in a Dramatic Program or Series	Keep Your Head Up, Kid: The Don Cherry Story	Won	
