= John Massari =

American composer and sound designer (born 1957)

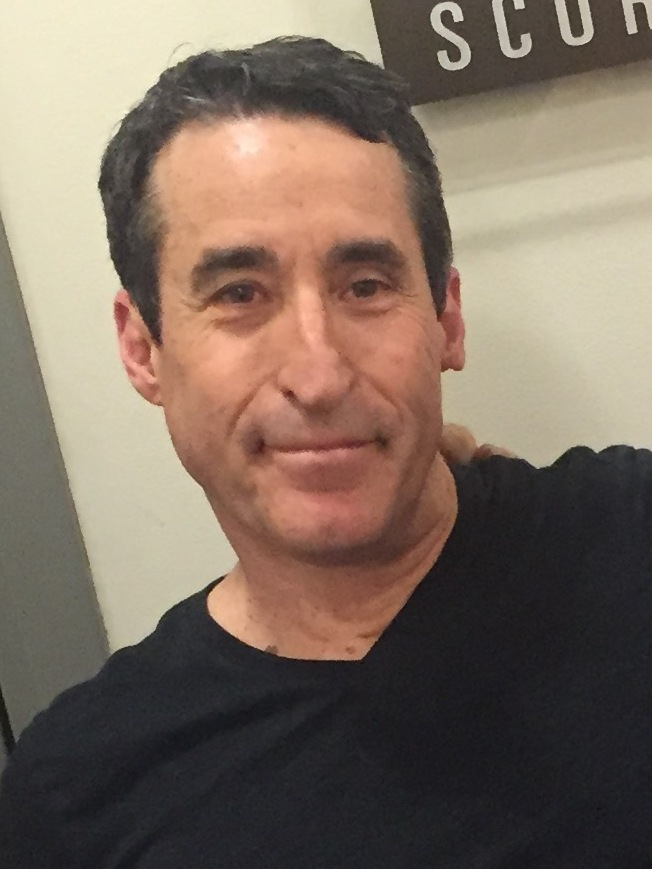
- Massari in 2016

Background information
- Birth name: Giovanni Massari
- Also known as: David Inlander; Biggy G
- Born: March 25, 1957 (age 68); New York City, New York, United States
- Genres: Film score
- Occupation: Composer
- Years active: 1978–present

John Massari (born March 25, 1957) is an American composer and sound designer. He is perhaps best known for scoring the cult classic Killer Klowns from Outer Space.

== Biography ==
Giovanni Massari was born on March 25, 1957, in New York City. Film music's powerful influence drew him to explore creating original music at age six as he began training on piano, trumpet and contra bass. Massari studied musical composition at Chapman University and later the University of California, Los Angeles (UCLA), where he studied orchestration and composition with David Raksin and Henri Lazarof. He also studied with Albert Harris and earned the Frank Sinatra Music Award for composition.

Massari scored the cult film Killer Klowns from Outer Space in 1988. Originally composed entire for synthesizers for budgetary reasons, the composer later recorded and released an orchestral version of the music through Varèse Sarabande in 2018; fellow film composer Bear McCreary made a guest appearance on the album, performing the accordion and hurdy-gurdy. Massari returned to the franchise again to compose the score for Killer Klowns from Outer Space: The Game in 2024.

Massari also scored and acted in the 1988 film The Wizard of Speed and Time, in addition to composing the theme for The Ray Bradbury Theater in 1985. His other credits include The Cell 2, Retro Puppet Master, and Prison Break: Proof of Innocence.

== Filmography ==
- Little House on the Prairie (1982–1983)
- Hart to Hart (1982)
- The Ray Bradbury Theater (Theme; 1985–1992)
- Jonny Quest (1987)
- The Wonderful World of Disney (1987)
- The Wizard of Speed and Time (1988)
- Killer Klowns from Outer Space (1988)
- Monsters (1988-1990)
- Snake Eater (1989)
- Snake Eater II: The Drug Buster (1990)
- Steel and Lace (1991)
- Diplomatic Immunity (1991)
- The Big Sweat (1991)
- Dogs Bark Blue (1992)
- Snake Eater III: His Law (1992)
- Death Ring (1992)
- Time Machine: The Journey Back (1993)
- The Making of '...And God Spoke' (1993)
- Kickboxer 5 (1995)
- The Redemption (1995)
- Shooting Lily (1996)
- Skeletons (HBO TV movie) (1997)
- Retro Puppet Master (1999)
- Final Stab (1999)
- Breathing Hard (2000)
- Ronny Camaro and Seven Angry Women (2003)
- Speed Demon (2003)
- 24: Conspiracy (TV series short) (2005)
- L. Frank Baum: The Man Behind the Curtain (2005)
- Ray Harryhausen: The Early Years Collection (2005)
- The Shield: Breaking Episode 315 (2005)
- The Wonderful Wizard of Oz Storybook (2005)
- Ring Around the Rosie (2006)
- Astaire and Rogers: Partners in Rhythm (2006)
- Tinker Bell: A Fairy's Tale (2007)
- Requiem & Rebirth: Superman Lives! (2007)
- Veritas, Prince of Truth (2007)
- Stem Cell (2009)
- From The Dark (2009)
- The Cell 2 (2009)
- American Pickers (2010)
- The Devil's Gravestone (2010)
- Trek Nation (2010)
- Game of Assassins (2013)
- The Wonderful World of Disney Theme (1988)
- Secret Lives of Stepford Wives (2014)
- Thrill Kill (2015)
