= A Day in a Taxi =

A Day in the Taxi
- French: Une journée en taxi
- Directed by: Robert Ménard
- Written by: Roger Fournier
- Produced by: Robert Ménard
- Starring: Gilles Renaud; Jean Yanne
- Cinematography: Pierre Mignot
- Edited by: Marcel Pothier
- Music by: Pierre F. Brault; Michel Robidoux
- Distributed by: Ciné 360 Inc.
- Release date: September 10, 1982 (Toronto Festival of Festivals)
- Running time: 84 minutes
- Countries: Canada; France
- Language: French
- Budget: $ 1,750,000 (estimated)

A Day in a Taxi (French: Une journée en taxi) is a French-language Canadian/French drama film, directed by Robert Ménard and released in 1982.

== Plot ==
A man named Johnny (Gilles Renaud), who becomes the fall guy for a bank robbery, is released from prison on a 36-hour parole. He takes a taxi driven by Michel (Jean Yanne). During the road trip, Johnny has second thoughts and eventually Michel finds himself in the middle.

== Cast's ==
- Gilles Renaud - Johnny
- Jean Yanne - Michel
- Yvon Dufour - Le restauranteur
- Muriel Dutil - Une femme au restaurant
- Sophie Faucher - La fille de l'accident

== Recognition ==
Award	Date of ceremony	Category	Recipient(s)	Result	Ref(s)
Genie Awards	March 23, 1983	Best Picture	Robert Ménard	Nominated	
Genie Awards	March 23, 1983	Best Actor	Gilles Renaud	Nominated	
Genie Awards	March 23, 1983	Best Foreign Actor	Jean Yanne	Nominated	
Genie Awards	March 23, 1983	Best Director	Robert Ménard	Nominated	
Genie Awards	March 23, 1983	Best Original Screenplay	Roger Fournier	Nominated	
Genie Awards	March 23, 1983	Best Cinematography	Pierre Mignot	Nominated	
Genie Awards	March 23, 1983	Best Overall Sound	Serge Beauchemin, David Appleby, Terry Burke, Dino Pigat	Nominated	
