= Speed Demon (2003 film) =

- DVD cover
- Directed by: David Decoteau
- Screenplay by: Matthew Jason Walsh
- Story by: David Decoteau; Matthew Jason Walsh
- Produced by: David DeCoteau; Gary Barkin; Marla Grossman
- Starring: Collin Stark; Mark Ian Miller; Candace Moon
- Cinematography: Bob Hayes
- Edited by: Bruce Little
- Music by: John Massari
- Production companies: Sidekick Entertainment; Rapid Heart Pictures
- Distributed by: Amsell Entertainment; Rapid Heart Pictures; The Asylum
- Release date: November 11, 2003
- Running time: 85 minutes
- Country: United States
- Language: English

Speed Demon is a 2003 Canadian-American horror film and directed by David DeCoteau and starring Collin Stark, Mark Ian Miller, and Candace Moon.

== Plot ==
Jesse returns home from college following the death of his mechanic father. He hooks back up with his brother Mikey and members of the muscle car-driving gang he used to hang with. Otto, the leader of the gang, has in his possession a "speed demon," an ancient demon bound in an amulet.

Mikey challenges Otto to a race and is killed when his car explodes. Grief-stricken, Jesse discovers another speed demon amulet in his home and remembers his father performing a ritual with it. Jesse performs the ritual and one by one the members of Otto's gang are killed by a mysterious black-clad helmeted driver.

As his gang dwindles and desperate to cement his hold on power, Otto challenges Jesse to a showdown. He believes that Jesse has tapped the power of his speed demon. Actually, it's Jesse's girlfriend who's been acting as the masked driver all along. She destroys Otto.

== Cast ==
- Collin Stark as Jesse
- Mark Ian Miller as Otto
- Candace Moon as Natalie
- M.T. Church as Chain Gang
- Trevor Harris as Mikey
- Greg Carney as Wiper
- Jared Edwards as Axle
- Amber Loy as Chopper
- Nick Doss as Clutch
- Mike Cole as Road Rage
