= Heads or Tails (1971 film) =

1971 Canadian film

- French: Pile ou face
- Directed by: Roger Fournier
- Written by: Gérald Tassé
- Produced by: John Dunning; Gérald Tassé; André Link
- Starring: Nathalie Naubert; Diane Arcand; Jean Coutu; Patricia Foster
- Cinematography: René Verzier
- Edited by: Jean Lafleur
- Music by: Stéphane Venne
- Production company: Cinepix Film Properties
- Release date: February 11, 1971
- Running time: 95 minutes
- Country: Canada
- Language: French

Heads or Tails (French: Pile ou face) is a Canadian sex comedy film, directed by Roger Fournier and released in 1971. The film centres on a group of friends who live in various places around the world and see each other once a year when they gather for a swingers weekend, but whose social equilibrium is upended when one of the circle cancels, sending in her place Stéphanie (Nathalie Naubert), a woman who is unwilling to participate in their sex games.

The cast includes Diane Arcand, Jean Coutu, Patricia Foster, Monique Bélisle, Jean-Denis Leduc, Jérôme Tiberghien, Jacqueline Fellay, Patrick Peuvion, Georges Carrère and Claudia Hen.

== Critical response ==
Martin Malina of the Montreal Gazette panned the film, writing that "the laughter is forced, the action, frenetic and aimless, and no one (least of all the audience) appears to be really enjoying himself." He further opined that the film would have been more appropriately titled "Pile ou fesses", or "Face or Asses".

His colleague Dane Lanken was a bit more charitable, writing that "it all comes out a little fuzzy. Russ Meyer can mix morals and absurdity and keep it all blissfully silly, whereas this crew bogs down a little. Consequently, Pile ou Face remains a nice nude romp with more than a few pretty faces and funny moments — and a lot of promise of good things to come."
