= Zombie High =

1987 film by Ron Link

- Directed by: Ron Link
- Written by: Tim Doyle; Aziz Ghazal; Elizabeth Passerelli
- Produced by: Aziz Ghazal; Elliott Kastner; Marc Toberoff
- Starring: Virginia Madsen; Richard Cox; James Wilder; Sherilyn Fenn; Paul Feig; Kay E. Kuter
- Cinematography: Brian Coyne; David Lux
- Edited by: Shawn Hardin; James Whitney
- Music by: Daniel May
- Production company: Cinema Group
- Distributed by: Palisades Entertainment Group
- Release date: October 2, 1987
- Running time: 93 minutes
- Country: United States
- Language: English

Zombie High (also known as The School That Ate My Brain) is a 1987 American comedy horror film directed by Ron Link. The film was released theatrically on October 2, 1987, and stars Virginia Madsen as a beautiful young teenager who must fight against a boarding school that is intent on turning everyone into a "perfect" student.

In the film, classical music is used for the mental conditioning of the brainwashed victims. A character accidentally finds out that rock music has the opposite effect, restoring human traits to the victims.

== Plot ==
Andrea (Virginia Madsen) is a teenage girl who has won a scholarship to Ettinger, a formerly all-male boarding school. She leaves behind her boyfriend Barry (James Wilder) in the hopes of scholastic achievement, but soon discovers that something seems wrong at Ettinger.

Andrea finds that her friends are slowly changing from regular teenagers into faceless drones. Some investigation shows that the school's faculty has been harvesting life-sustaining chemicals from the student body, which makes them seemingly perfect students who are focused on doing well in school and obeying rules.

Andrea is spared from this fate by one of her professors, Philo (Richard Cox), who takes pity on her because of her resemblance to a former lover. Along with her boyfriend, Andrea discovers that the staff uses classical music to stabilize the students. Philo gives her a tape to play over the loudspeaker system, which he claims will stop the faculty and students from capturing her and turning her into a zombie, only for her to lose it while the students chase her. With nothing to lose, Barry plays a tape of rock music in its place, accomplishing the desired task of stopping the students and saving their lives.

== Cast ==
- Virginia Madsen as Andrea
- Paul Feig as Emerson
- Sherilyn Fenn as Suzi
- Clare Carey as Mary Beth
- Scott Coffey as Felner
- Richard Cox as Philo
- Kay E. Kuter as Dean Beauregard Eisner
- Henry Sutton as Bell
- Walter Addison as Chief Hillis
- Christopher Peters as Phillip
- Christopher Crews as Biff
- James Wilder as Barry
- John Sack as Senator Felner
- Paul Williams as Ignatius
- Susan Barnes as Mom
- Jeff Morgan as Zombie student
- Tease (Music Band, with Kipper Jones, Derek Organ and Tommy Organ) as themself

== Reception ==
Lana Cooper of Brutal as Hell wrote, "For unintentional humor and as an ‘80s genre horror timepiece, Zombie High cannot be beat. Just don’t expect to be scared." The Chicago Tribune panned the film in a 1988 review, expressing surprise that Madsen would star in Zombie High, as they viewed it as a step down from her previous acting work. Michael Wilmington of the Los Angeles Times called it "a student project gone awry". Glenn Kay, who wrote Zombie Movies: The Ultimate Guide, called the film a "nondescript, forgettable flick". Writing in The Zombie Movie Encyclopedia, academic Peter Dendle said, "The movie plays the concept more seriously than the title lets on, and, in fact, winds up dragging quite a bit."
