= King of the Mountain (film) =

- Theatrical release poster
- Directed by: Noel Nosseck
- Written by: Leigh Chapman; H.R. Christian
- Produced by: Jack Frost Sanders
- Starring: Harry Hamlin; Joseph Bottoms; Deborah Van Valkenburgh; Richard Cox; Seymour Cassel; Dennis Hopper
- Edited by: William Steinkamp
- Music by: Michael Melvoin
- Production company: PolyGram Pictures
- Distributed by: Universal Pictures
- Release date: May 1, 1981
- Running time: 90 minutes
- Country: United States
- Language: English
- Budget: $2 million
- Box office: $2.1 million

King of the Mountain is a 1981 American Action thriller drama film starring Harry Hamlin, Joseph Bottoms, Deborah Van Valkenburgh, Richard Cox, Seymour Cassel and Dennis Hopper about a group that race their cars up and down Mulholland Drive for both money and prestige.

The film's primary focus is Steve (Harry Hamlin), who has found himself generally content with his uncomplicated life of working and racing. This creates some amount of tension between him and his friends, who have been losing their interest in racing and have been attempting to make serious inroads in the music industry. Steve's blossoming relationship with singer Tina (Deborah Van Valkenburgh) causes him to re-think his mantra, as he realizes that a truly fulfilling life involves more than just work and play.

The film was poorly regarded critically and did not perform well in the box office, although it was significant in being among the first films about street racing and communities of street racers, as well as because it was inspired by the activities of real people who raced in the Los Angeles area. It also marked somewhat of a return for Dennis Hopper, who had spent several months secluded away from Los Angeles prior to making his appearance.

== Plot ==
Steve works at a Porsche repair garage by day and by night reigns as the "King of The Mountain", the most successful and talented of a group that organize, wager on and participate in races up and down the narrow, winding roads of Mulholland Drive in the hills on the edge of the San Fernando Valley. In his highly tuned 356 Speedster, Steve races against both newcomers and veterans alike, never really considering the risks associated with the lifestyle or if there might be more for him elsewhere.

Steve's friends Buddy and Roger want to get into the music industry, and although they once raced alongside Steve, their focus has shifted away from racing in favor of their potential careers, leaving Steve to reign as King alone, racing night after night for the thrills, but without much of the joy he once got from the racing. Aside from wanting the thrill, Steve is egged on by Cal, a co-worker and the former King who reigned until a near-fatal accident destroyed his now aging, dilapidated Corvette and drove him over the edge mentally.

When Steve meets Tina, a young singer working with Buddy and Roger, he quickly falls for her and tries to introduce her to the world of street racing, but finds that she isn't as enthralled with it as he is and isn't interested in returning to the races or in being involved with a man who is constantly risking his life for a thrill. Torn between Tina and his life as a racer, Steve must choose to either remain King, or abdicate and leave so that he can start over in "real life". All the while, Cal is secretly rebuilding his Corvette, and he wants a shot at winning his title back.

The film's climax depicts a dangerous, high speed race down the hill between Steve and Cal.

== Background ==
During the 1960s and 1970s small groups were racing on some of the narrow, steep, twisting and particularly dangerous portions of Mulholland in and near the Santa Monica Mountains as well as on nearby stretches of Laurel Canyon Boulevard, Coldwater Canyon, Nichols Canyon Road and other adjacent streets. This community of racers became notorious to the nearby canyon residents and later, to people all across the city. Light Police patrols were eventually increased into a full-force crackdown on racing in the area after complaints were fielded from the residents and accidents, sometimes resulting in death and/or serious injury occurred. On a few occasions, Police were forced to chase suspected racers through the narrow roads, and were not always able to keep up, leading to a few "escapes" by the racers.

During the late 1970s an article titled "Thunder Road" appeared in an issue of New West Magazine, the article detailed some of what was going on in the canyon and made specific reference to two particular drivers; Chris Banning, who owned and raced a heavily modified Porsche 911 and Charles "Crazy Charlie" Woit, who owned and raced a vintage, 427 cubic-inch Big-Block powered Chevrolet Corvette. The article provided the inspiration for the film, and its two main characters, who were based on Banning and Woit.

In 2006, Chris Banning wrote a book entitled "The Mulholland Experience" detailing his experiences, what it was like being a part of that community, and being the inspiration for the film.

== Production ==
Harry Hamlin's Speedster was actually a modified Volkswagen Beetle based kit car wearing a replica body with flared fenders; actual Speedsters did not have the flares. This was done primarily because real Speedsters are very rare; it would have been difficult and expensive to locate a real one for rent and the possibility of damaging the vehicle was too great.

Dennis Hopper actually drove his character's Corvette on at least one instance to get footage for the film's climactic race. The vehicle was fitted with three compact Arri cameras, each with a three hundred foot roll of film installed and each connected to an in-cabin switch allowing Hopper to turn them on when he started and off when the film ran out. On the day the footage was to be shot, Hopper was reportedly very drunk; he had spent the day in his trailer drinking beer. Despite crew protests, director Noel Nosseck allowed Hopper to drive the car, and according to crew members he entered the car with a fresh six-pack. After taking off, he spent almost an hour in the vehicle, despite there being only enough film for a few minutes of footage, and returned with the six-pack empty.

== Home media ==
The film's only official home video release was a VHS format version available for a brief period during the 1980s. DVD copies of the film occasionally appear for sale on sites such as EBay, these are legal "backup" copies made from VHS cassettes.

In 2016, the film was officially released in the U.S. for Digital HD and Video On Demand and is available from digital retailers like iTunes and Amazon.

King of the Mountain was officially released on Blu-Ray on November 24, 2020. Bonus features include a 10-minute interview with Harry Hamlin and an interview with the director, Noel Nosseck. Also included are the original movie trailers.
