= Love in a Four Letter World =

1970 Canadian film

- Directed by: John Sone
- Written by: John Sone; Arthur Veronka
- Produced by: John Dunning; Arthur Veronka; André Link
- Starring: Michael Kane; Helen Whyte; Candy Greene
- Cinematography: René Verzier
- Edited by: Glenn Ludlov
- Music by: Paul Baillargeon; Dean Morgan
- Production company: Cinepix Film Properties
- Release date: August 13, 1970
- Running time: 93 minutes
- Country: Canada
- Language: English

Love in a Four Letter World is a Canadian softcore pornographic film, directed by John Sone and released in 1970. The film stars Michael Kane and Helen Whyte as Harry and Vera Haven, a wealthy couple whose lives are turned upside down when a group of hippies move into a commune in the house next door, drawing first their daughter Susan (Candy Greene), and then Helen herself, into their bohemian free love philosophy.

The cast also includes André Lawrence, Pierre Létourneau, Cayle Chernin and Monique Mercure.

The film was shot in the Crescent Street neighbourhood of Montreal. Producer Arthur Veronka claimed that "outside of Isabel or any Paul Almond production, Love in a Four Letter World is the first English-Canadian film that doesn't have that National Film Board-CBC look."

The film was entered in competition at the 22nd Canadian Film Awards in 1970, although Cinepix Film Properties, the film's studio, subsequently withdrew it and Here and Now (L'Initiation) from the competition after an article in Time implied that the Canadian Film Award jury was unsympathetic to the films' sexual content.

== Production ==
Shooting was done in Montreal and finished by 5 December 1969. The Canadian Film Development Corporation invested $79,491 into the production.

== Release ==
The film premiered in Montreal on 13 August 1970, and was theatrically released on 14 August.

== Reception ==
The film received mixed reaction from critics. Martin Knelman of The Globe and Mail panned it, writing that "people smile over drinks and comment politely about the photography or the humor, but really there's no saving grace about Love in a Four Letter World. Even technically, it's dreadfully amateurish, and as for humor the word is in this case a euphemism for the hideous smirking that infests a movie when those involved aren't sure whether they can get away with playing the material straight or whether it would be better to try passing it off as camp," while Marilyn Beker of the Montreal Gazette wrote that it "is not a bad movie. In fact it is the kind of movie that tries too hard to be good and is constantly foiled. The sets are all polished and modern but the aging conceptualizers tried their hardest to figure out what the inside of a 'hippie pad' would look like and came out with a kind of Better Homes and Gardens version of how poor-but-arty people should live."

== Works cited ==
- Dilley, Constance (2018). Crosscurrents: How film policy developed in Quebec 1960-1983. Presses de l'Université du Québec. ISBN 9782760549395.
- Turner, D. John, ed. (1987). Canadian Feature Film Index: 1913-1985. Canadian Film Institute. ISBN 0660533642.
