= Richard Cox (actor) =

American actor (born 1948)

- Born: May 6, 1948 (age 78)
- Occupation: Actor
- Years active: 1974–present

Richard Cox (born May 6, 1948) is an American theater, film and television actor. He is known for his roles as Stuart Richards in the film Cruising and Max Frazier on Ghostwriter. He has won a Clarence Derwent Award and was nominated for Broadway's 1979 Tony Award as Best Actor (Featured Role - Musical) for Platinum.

== Personal life and education ==
Richard Cox, whose full name is Richard Cox Zuckerman, was born on May 6, 1948 in New York City, New York, USA. He is the only child of Gabe Zuckerman and Rosanna Cox, both of whom were professional dancers. He first took the stage at the age of eight with his mother at the Petersburg Players Professional Theatre in Peterborough, New Hampshire, who frequently performed there. Cox cited it as the spark that got him interested in the theatre and still considers himself a member of the institution. Cox trained at the American Repertory Theater when he was young. Cox then went on to study at Yale, dual majoring in drama and anthropology.

== Career ==
Cox performed on Broadway with Ingrid Bergman in Captain Brassbound's Conversion before going to Hollywood in 1975 with the national company of Grease.

He appeared with Al Pacino in Cruising (1980) and Looking for Richard (1996). Other film credits include Seizure (1974), Between the Lines (1977), Sanford and Son (1975), King of the Mountain (1981), Hellhole (1985), The Vindicator (1986), Zombie High (1987) and Radio Free Albemuth (2010).

He played a terrorist fighting for independence in the Star Trek: The Next Generation episode "The High Ground" (1990).

== Filmography ==
=== Film ===
Year	Title	Role	Notes
1974	Seizure	Gerald	
1977	Between the Lines	Stuart Wheeler	
1980	Cruising	Stuart Richards	
1981	King of the Mountain	Roger	
1983	Can She Bake a Cherry Pie?	Customer At Cafe	
1985	Hellhole	Ron	
1986	The Vindicator	Alex Whyte	
1987	Zombie High	Philo	
1987	Street Justice	Sam Chandler	
1989	The Oasis	Paul	
1996	Looking for Richard	Self / Lord Catesby	
1997	A Hero's Climb	Storeman	
2001	Besotted	Raymond	
2002	Outta Time	Taylor	
2002	Storm Watch	Richard Clark	
2003	Missing Brendan	Sean Calden	
2005	Barry Dingle	Levinowsky	
2008	The Toe Tactic	Stalker Timmy	
2010	Radio Free Albemuth	Dr. Weinberg	
2011	Wilde Salomé	Robbie Ross	

=== Television ===
Year	Title	Role	Notes
1975	Sunshine	Levis	Episode: "Buy the Book"
1975	Sanford and Son	Hippie Kid	Episode: "The Sanford Arms"
1975	Baretta	Detective Josephson / Pogo	2 episodes
1976	The Adams Chronicles	Col. William Stephens Smith	Episode: "Chapter IV: John Adams, Minister to Great Britain"
1976–1977	Executive Suite	Mark Desmond	18 episodes
1978	What Really Happened to the Class of '65?	Josh	Episode: "Reunion in Terror"
1979	The Rockford Files	Kenny Spector	Episode: "Love Is the Word"
1980	Stone	Peter Ward	Episode: "Just a Little Blow Between Friends"
1980	Camp Grizzly	Nick	Television film
1982	Alice at the Palace	Caterpillar / Mad Hatter	Television film
1982	Remington Steele	Tony Dinaldo	Episode: "Etched in Steele"
1983	Simon & Simon	Duke Dwyer	Episode: "What's in a Gnome?"
1983	Magnum, P.I.	Randy	Episode: "The Big Blow"
1985	Scarecrow and Mrs. King	Malcolm Burling	Episode: "Life of the Party"
1986	Alfred Hitchcock Presents	Ben	Episode: "Four O'Clock"
1986	Slow Burn	Tommy Walsh	Television film
1987	Hunter	Carl Remick	Episode: "Crossfire"
1987	The Bronx Zoo	Charlie Turner	4 episodes
1987	Murder, She Wrote	Clay McCloud	Episode: "Witness for the Defense"
1987	Once Again	Jag	Television film
1988	Shattered Innocence	Brad Pullman	Television film
1988	Tanner '88	David Seidelman	7 episodes
1988	CBS Summer Playhouse	Searles	Episode: "Mad Avenue"
1988	Unholy Matrimony	Irvin Dymond	Television film
1988	Midnight Caller	Mike Barnes	Episode: "After It Happened"
1989	Peaceable Kingdom	Frank Everett	Episode: "Aardvark"
1989	Freddy's Nightmares	Jerry	Episode: "Heartbreak Hotel"
1989	Designing Women	Barringer	Episode: "Manhunt"
1989	L.A. Law	Curtis Haber	Episode: "Lie Down and Deliver"
1990	Star Trek: The Next Generation	Kyril Finn	Episode: "The High Ground"
1990	WIOU	Jimi Slavin	Episode: "Diamond Dogs"
1991–1992	Loving	Gifford Bowman	124 episodes
1992–1994	Ghostwriter	Max Frazier	13 episodes
1993	Law & Order	Steven Gregg	Episode: "Right to Counsel"
1995	Young at Heart	Marco	Television film
1995	Legend	Flintridge Caine	Episode: "Custer's Next to Last Stand"
1997	Millennium	Alistair 'Al' Pepper	Episode: "Powers, Principalities, Thrones and Dominions"
1997	Guiding Light	David Jacobs / Richard Jacobs	2 episodes
1997–1998	The Visitor	Asst. Director Grushaw	4 episodes
1998	The Net	Jericho Denain	Episode: "Harvest"
2000	Nash Bridges	Norman Craft	Episode: "Heist"
2000	Diagnosis: Murder	Administrator Zanuck	Episode: "A Resting Place"
2000	The X-Files	Daniel Brimley	Episode: "Brand X"
2000	The Huntress	Adam Kirkman	Episode: "Bad Boys & Why We Love Them"
2000	American Tragedy	Alan Dershowitz	Television film
2000	The Fugitive	Al Greenlaw	Episode: "Liar's Poker"
2001	The Practice	Attorney Stuart Miller	Episode: "Liar's Poker"
2002	Titus	Dr. Franklin	Episode: "The Session"
2003	Dragnet	Alex Von Loy	Episode: "The Artful Dodger"
2003	ER	Rick Mathers	Episode: "Shifts Happen"
2003	Veritas: The Quest	Cosimo Medici	Episode: "The Lost Codex"
2004	JAG	Mr. Handy	Episode: "A Girl's Best Friend"
2004	Without a Trace	Father Gavin Cavanagh	Episode: "Risen"
2005	Threshold	Capt. Hank Mancini	Episode: "Blood of the Children"
2005	Numbers	Edward Barret	Episode: "Calculated Risk"
2005	Cold Case	Clifton Coleman	Episode: "Start-Up"
2006	Crossing Jordan	Clark Credle	Episode: "Code of Ethics"
2006	The Closer	Michael Henson	Episode: "Out of Focus"
2006	Close to Home	Henry Brooks	Episode: "Legacy"
2007	Raines	Richard Billings	Episode: "Closure"
2007	Bones	Atty. Leonard Huntzinger	Episode: "Soccer Mom in the Mini-Van"
2007	Moonlight	Richard Haggans	Episode: "Fleur De Lis"
2008	Blank Slate	Senator Davis Wilmont	Television film
2008	Leverage	Charles Dufort	Episode: "The Homecoming Job"
2009	Southland	David Milliard	Episode: "Westside"
2011	CSI: Miami	Judge Ebersol	2 episodes
2012	The Mentalist	Brother Josef	Episode: "Ruddy Cheeks"
2013	NCIS: Los Angeles	Dr. Roy Hale	Episode: "History"
2013	Franklin & Bash	Greg Harrell	Episode: "Freck"
2013–2014	Alpha House	Graydon Talbot	10 episodes
2015	A Mother Betrayed	Harry	Television film
2015	The Librarians	Prospero	4 episodes
2016	Gilmore Girls: A Year in the Life	Franklin	Episode: "Winter"
2019	Grey's Anatomy	Marvin Reed	Episode: "I Walk The Line"
2020	Novelmore	Tindercloak	Episode: "Family Ties"

=== Theatre ===
1978 Year Platinum Title Dan DangerRole Broadway Clarence Derwent Award, Tony and Drama Desk NominationsVenue 1993: Blood Brothers (The Narrator) . Music Box Theater	Writer			
1975: Moonchildren Theater de Lys 1990	What a Man Weighs	Haseltine	Second Stage Theater	Sherry Kramer
