= The Vindicator (film) =

- VHS cover
- Directed by: Jean-Claude Lord
- Written by: Edith Rey; David Preston
- Produced by: Don Carmody; John Dunning
- Starring: David McIlwraith; Teri Austin; Richard Cox; Pam Grier; Maury Chaykin
- Cinematography: René Verzier
- Edited by: Michaël Karen
- Music by: Paul Zaza
- Production company: Michael Levy Enterprises
- Distributed by: 20th Century Fox
- Release date: February 14, 1986
- Running time: 93 min
- Country: Canada
- Language: English

The Vindicator (also known as Frankenstein '88 and known in Brazil as Roboman) is a 1986 Canadian science fiction film directed by Jean-Claude Lord. The film is a modern-day retelling of the classic Frankenstein story set in the 1980s. Its plot involves a man who was killed in an accident in a laboratory, but revived as part of an experiment as a cyborg. The film was released by 20th Century Fox and released on video by Key Video (a division of CBS/FOX Video) and is now out of print. The special effects were by Stan Winston.

== Plot ==
Carl Lehman is a scientist working on a next-generation space suit for the ARC corporation in a high-tech secret lab, run by the sinister Alex Whyte. One of the projects being developed for the space suit, the "rage program", is software that can take over the brain of the user when attacked to destroy the attacker. One day, Alex Whyte is performing test trials of the software on monkeys. Alex, out of curiosity, has the rage factor turned up beyond safe levels, killing the monkey.

After Carl confronts Whyte about suspicious funding cuts, Whyte sends his employee Massey to rig an explosion in Carl's lab, killing him and disguising the death as a lab accident.

ARC informs Carl's pregnant wife Lauren and her friend Catherine that Carl has died. In reality, Whyte is keeping Carl's charred body in a suspension tank filled with oxygenating fluid that keeps his brain functioning. Using Carl's space suit and ARC's cutting-edge prosthetics technology, they build Carl a cyborg body and dub him "Project Frankenstein." The rage program is also installed with a remote control unit acting as a safeguard. The reanimation initially fails, so researcher Gail Vernon disassembles the suit. After the remote control unit is removed, a short circuit causes Carl to suddenly come back to life. When Gail tries to reinstall his control unit, Carl pushes her away. She falls onto a control panel, which releases all of the lab monkeys. They attack Gail in a rage and kill her.

Carl sneaks out of the building and stows away on a garbage truck, which drops him into an incinerator. His flight suit is burned away, revealing the cybernetic prosthetics underneath. However, thanks to his immense strength, he is able to break out and heads for his residence. On the way, some street thugs chase him into an alley. When they attack him, his suit activates and sends him into a rage. He brutally overpowers and kills all of them. Realizing that the rage program forbids close contact with people, Carl talks to his wife from outside their house using radio signals and a faulty synthesizer in their living room.

Later, the thugs' bodies are discovered. Whyte, fearing a police investigation of Project Frankenstein, hires the elite assassin Hunter to track down and eliminate Carl.

The next day, Lauren visits Carl's colleague and friend Burt Arthurs to tell him about her conversation with Carl. Burt shows her security footage of the accident to convince her of Carl's death. In the evening, Carl's voice comes over the synthesizer again; this time, however, Whyte's accomplice Kessler is monitoring them. Carl learns that Massey signed his autopsy report and death certificate, and sets out to confront him. At his home, secured by Hunter's forces, Massey is snorting cocaine and evicting his girlfriend Lisa when Carl appears to interrogate him. In doing so, Carl learns that if he can get to the suit's programming, he can remove the rage program. Massey shoots Carl in panic, which causes Carl to again lose control and he throws Massey out of the window. Lisa bears witness, so Hunter kills her to cover up the project.

Carl flees down the sewers, and Hunter gives pursuit along with her men. They corner Carl, and their guns damage his life-support system. Carl defends himself by ripping open a gas line and manages to incinerate Hunter's men as well as Kessler, then escapes. Hunter confronts Whyte, who had not disclosed the Frankenstein enhancements, and he admits that the enhanced Carl is nearly indestructible. Meanwhile, Carl arranges a meeting with Lauren by coded message. Upset over his grotesque appearance, he exhorts her to leave him and move far away. He also asks her to summon Burt's help, which she does. Carl meets with him but, unbeknownst to Carl, Burt has betrayed him and is working for Whyte and the two have set a trap for Carl. He falls through a rigged floor into a trap of quick-setting resin. Whyte sends the block of resin to ARC, but Carl's strength prevails and he breaks out during transport. Meanwhile, Whyte tells Burt that he has to get rid of Lauren as well if he wants to keep his high paying position.

Burt goes to the Lehman residence, where he confesses his love for Lauren and suggests that they should escape and be together and become a family. Lauren rebuffs him so he angrily assaults her by strangulation. Catherine comes home and attacks Burt and she and Lauren overpower him. As they are trying to escape, Hunter arrives and kills Catherine and Burt knocks Lauren unconscious. Burt knows that he is ruined if Lauren escapes, so Hunter advises that he take Lauren and Catherine and dump them in the nearby lake.

Carl shows up and, in a panic, Burt rams him repeatedly with his car. Carl is sent into another rage and he crushes Burt's car, killing him, but not before Lauren slips out of the passenger door. However, she is captured by Hunter and taken to ARC to lure Carl. Meanwhile, Whyte's girlfriend is being interrogated by the police, hinting that Project Frankenstein will be investigated and defused.

At ARC, Carl manages to evade the security cameras for some time, so Hunter goes on the intercom and threatens to kill Lauren unless he comes to the laboratory to bargain for her. There, Hunter throws Lauren onto Carl to provoke him, but he does not go into a rage, since he reprogrammed himself in the computer room while the cameras were not monitoring him. Realizing she is no match for the cyborg, Hunter commits suicide. Carl and Lauren get to Whyte, who has continued his experiment by turning the corpses of Gail and Kessler into cyborgs and has programmed them to protect him. Whyte is also wearing one of the suits himself. Carl, his life-support failing, battles Whyte while Lauren dispatches the others by pulling their own life-support umbilical cables. As Whyte begins to overpower Carl, Lauren hands him an umbilical, which he connects to Whyte's suit and drowns him by filling his suit with fluid. His own fluid supply exhausted, Carl finally and truly dies.

Years later, Lauren is visiting an aeronautics museum with her son Carl Jr. There, they admire a display of the suits, one of which is Carl's original suit. A guide is heard explaining a fabricated story that Carl was the first to valiantly test the suit and that as a result of his suit being torched, they were able to fix its weaknesses and were able to then successfully deploy them on Mars. Meanwhile, Carl Jr. asks if he was a hero, to which Lauren responds that he was.

== Cast ==
- David McIlwraith as Carl
- Teri Austin as Lauren
- Richard Cox as Whyte
- Pam Grier as Hunter
- Maury Chaykin as Burt

== Production ==
The Vindicator was filmed in Montreal, Quebec.

== Critical reaction ==
Janis L. Pallister in her survey of Quebecker cinema calls The Vindicator "tedious", noting a strong influence from the earlier films of David Cronenberg. Horror Chronicles praised the special effects, while criticising a thin storyline and uneven pacing. Film School Rejects criticised the acting and low production values. HorrorMovies.ca gave it 7/10.
