= Toby McTeague =

- DVD cover
- Directed by: Jean-Claude Lord
- Written by: Jeff Maguire; Jamie Brown; Djordje Milicevic
- Produced by: Nicolas Clermont
- Starring: Yannick Bisson; Winston Rekert; Andrew Bednarski; Rich Trelford
- Cinematography: René Verzier
- Edited by: Yves Langlois
- Release date: 1986
- Running time: 96 minutes
- Country: Canada
- Language: English

Toby McTeague is a 1986 Canadian children's action-adventure drama film directed by Jean-Claude Lord. It stars Yannick Bisson as Toby McTeague, a teenager training to compete in a dog sled race.

The film was shot primarily in the small town of Sainte-Rose-du-Nord, Quebec.

The film received two Genie Award nominations at the 8th Genie Awards in 1987, for Best Cinematography (René Verzier) and Best Original Song ("Cold As Ice" by Peter Pringle and Kevin Hunter). A minor controversy resulted when the Academy of Canadian Cinema and Television mistakenly omitted "Cold As Ice" from the first ballots sent out to Academy voters.
