= Chantal Renaud =

Canadian script writer (born 1946)

Chantal Renaud (born 26 August 1946) is a Canadian script writer, and formerly a yé-yé singer and actress. She was the wife of former Quebec Premier and Parti Québécois leader Bernard Landry.

Renaud began her career as a yé-yé singer, with a hit called "Comme un garçon", originally performed by Sylvie Vartan, in France. After acting in the sitcom Moi et l'autre and films such as Here and Now (L'Initiation) and Finalement..., Renaud relocated to France, where she built a respectable career as an award-winning script writer.

On 26 June 2004, after a courtship of some years, she married the widower former Premier of Quebec and then Parti Québécois leader Bernard Landry. She figures prominently in the 2003 documentary À Hauteur d'homme about the 2003 Quebec general election, during which Landry defended his post as leader of Quebec.

She also portrayed a village woman in Je T'aimerai Toujours in 1969.

== See also ==
- List of Quebec musicians
- List of Quebec actors
