= Snake Eater (film) =

1989 film by George Erschbamer

- Official DVD cover
- Directed by: George Erschbamer
- Written by: Michael Paseornek; John Dunning
- Produced by: John Dunning
- Starring: Lorenzo Lamas; Josie Bell; Robert Scott; Ronnie Hawkins
- Cinematography: Glen MacPherson
- Edited by: Jacqueline Carmody
- Music by: John Massari
- Production company: Cinepix Film Properties
- Distributed by: Cinema International Canada
- Release date: March 10, 1989 (Montreal)
- Running time: 94 minutes
- Country: Canada
- Language: English
- Budget: CAD$1,300,000

Snake Eater is a 1989 Canadian crime action film directed by George Erschbamer, starring Lorenzo Lamas, Josie Bell, Robert Scott and Ronnie Hawkins. Released on March 10, 1989, it was Lamas' first action film, and Cinépix's attempt at the type of action vehicle that was popular at the time. Harkening back to the Canadian company's exploitation roots, it infused the veteran vigilante storyline found in many contemporary films with "hicksploitation" elements, which many reviewers found distasteful but did not prevent its commercial success. Three more installments followed between 1989 and 1997. It is the first installment in the Snake Eater film series.

== Plot ==
Jack "Soldier" Kelly is a New York City police officer and Vietnam veteran. Having served in the Marine Special Forces (nicknamed the "Snake Eaters"), he has retained a penchant for unorthodox methods and makeshift traps. Kelly learns that his parents have been killed and his sister abducted in rural Tennessee, and travels to the backwater town where the attack took place.

He finds out that it lives under the boot of a violent redneck clan led by the demented "Junior" Night, who dresses in a bear costume to commit some of his crimes. King, an old mechanic, takes a liking to Kelly and transforms his trusty chopper bike into a jetski. Now able to navigate the local waterways, Kelly tracks down the gang to enact his vengeance and rescue his sister.

== Cast ==
- Lorenzo Lamas as Officer Jack "Soldier" Kelly
- Josie Bell as The Kid
- Robert Scott as Junior Night
- Ronnie Hawkins as King
- Ron Palillo as Torchy
- Randy White as Jesse Night
- Matthew Mabe as Eli Night
- Barry Minshull as "Slim" Night
- Carl Cook as Clyde Night
- Sandra Brown as Sissy Night
- Ben DiGregorio as Detective Santucci
- Larry Csonka as Detective Bronsky
- Rick Collins as Uncle Joe
- Mowava Pryor as Chloe
- Michael Ballew as "The Dentist"
- Cherly Jeans as Jennifer Kelly
- Bob Piedalve as Harold Kelly
- Jackie Lesage as Dorothy Kelly

== Production ==
=== Development ===
Snake Eater had the working title of Massacre on Blood River, and was announced as Jack Kelly: Snake Eater. Although the Snake Eater moniker was derived from a genuine nickname given to commando units operating in the jungles of Vietnam, the 103rd Tactical Unit was fictitious. The character's backstory was cobbled together from interviews with Vietnam War veterans, while the unit's logo was created by Stephen Van Gelden Studios, a Canadian graphic design agency. While the films are not narratively connected, the main antagonist's name and redneck marina setting are shared with Cinépix's earlier slasher film, Junior.

=== Casting ===
Snake Eater was Lorenzo Lamas' first true action film role, other than hosting a martial arts-themed fitness video a few months earlier. The 30-year old had long had an interest for the genre, working as a stuntman early in his career, but his looks had pigeonholed him in romantic roles. His casting came by chance, as he and the film's Los Angeles-based casting director shared the same mechanic. When she mentioned the project to the latter, he suggested that Lamas would be a good fit. Rock singer Ronnie Hawkins and former NFL player Larry Csonka were added because they were celebrities, but owed their fame to careers outside of film, and therefore did not commend the fee of an established actor.

=== Filming ===
The picture had a CAD$1.3 million budget. It was filmed in the region of Shediac, New Brunswick, in partnership with local company Carota Films, across the months of September and October 1988. Due to the tight, 18-day schedule, the shoot was reportedly grueling, with some days lasting as much as 22 hours. It was further impacted by poor location scouting, as the river arm originally selected for the houseboat scenes was affected by low tide, forcing the crew to move to another location. George Erschbamer made his main unit directorial debut on the film. He was chosen based on his experience in practical effects, including on the Canadian-filmed Rambo: First Blood, and his second unit work on Cinépix's State Park.

The bikers appearing in the film were recruited in Saint John, and many were real-life criminals. When the film's production manager visited them to solicit their participation, they accepted but still made it a point to flatten his car's tires. The wardrobe manager, who was gay, did not feel safe in their presence and refused to interact with them, forcing Dunning to hastily fill the position. Due to his tattoos and legitimate interest in motorcycles, Lamas was quickly accepted by the bikers. Although some were reluctant, the producers insisted they had to wear costumes designed for the film to make their appearance more eccentric.

== Music ==
=== Soundtrack ===
The film score was composed and produced by John Massari. Massari also co-wrote the film's theme song "Soldier" with its performer Brian Wild (George Flowers), a veteran of the Los Angeles rock club scene who contributed to a few other soundtracks of the era. The song's title was prominently featured in the end credits, and Cinépix announced that it would be released in Canada and the U.S. as a single, but there is no evidence that it happened.

== Release ==
=== Marketing ===
To promote the film, Lorenzo Lamas modeled a line of apparel featuring the logo of the fictional Snake Eater unit, which was distributed through the Canadian chain Work Wearhouse. Image Organization, the Los Angeles-based company of fellow Quebecer Pierre David, was a partner in the film's international sales.

=== Theatrical ===
In Canada, Snake Eater debuted in Cinépix's hometown of Montreal on March 10, 1989, both in an English version and a French version named L'Indomptable (lit. 'The Untameable'), and subsequently traveled to other regions in a touring regional release from Cinépix distribution arm Cinema International Canada and Famous Players. In the U.S., the film also employed the touring model, debuting in various Tennessee markets on May 20, 1989, through distributor Moviestore Entertainment.

=== Home media ===
In the U.S., Snake Eater was released on VHS by distributor Media (a subsidiary of Heron Communications) on February 21, 1990. Media also issued a LaserDisc of the film via LD specialists Image Entertainment. Within one month of the American version, the Canadian VHS was released by Cinépix affiliate CFP Video.

== Reception ==
=== Critical response ===
Snake Eater received mostly negative reviews from critics. Marc Horton, of Canadian newspaper The Edmonton Journal, lamented: "Alas, but Snake Eater, a soon-to-be-gone film from Edmonton screens, is a Canadian production." Writing in The Age of Melbourne, Jim Murphy assessed: "This blend of Deliverance and Straw Dogs is abominably acted and never convincing. In his New York Daily News column, genre critic Joe Kane excoriated the film as a "primitive, relentlessly predictable and generally abysmal actioner", adding that Lamas' "abundant lack of charm in no way compensates for his glaring thespic ineptitude."

Among more moderate opinions, trade publication Variety conceded that the film possessed a "tongue-in-cheek quality". Mike Pearson, in his Scripps Howard column, described the film as "enjoyable junk" and "the sort of trash you would never admit to liking, yet nonetheless do." A rare enthusiastic review came from self-professed "drive-in critic" Joe Bob Briggs. In his syndicated column, he praised director Erschbamer for "creative use of explosives" and the Junior character as "one of the sleaziest pond-scum psycho-billies ever portrayed in the movies".

=== Year-end lists ===
- 2nd worst – Joe Kane (The Phantom of the Movies), New York Daily News

== Franchise ==
=== Sequels ===
Lamas returned in two sequels: Snake Eater II: The Drug Buster (1991), which entered production before the first film was released, and Snake Eater III: His Law (1992).

=== Spin-off ===
A fourth movie, Hawk's Vengeance, which starred Gary Daniels rather than Lamas, followed in 1996.
