= Captains Courageous (1996 film) =

- Based on: Captains Courageous by Rudyard Kipling
- Written by: John McGreevey
- Directed by: Michael Anderson; Matthew O'connor; Lee Knippelberg
- Starring: Robert Urich; Kenny Vadas; Kaj-Erik Eriksen
- Music by: Claude Desjardins; Eric Robertson
- Countries of origin: United States; Canada
- Original language: English

Production
- Executive producers: Tony Allard; Robert Halmi Sr. Matthew O'Connor
- Producer: Lisa Towers
- Cinematography: Glen MacPherson
- Editor: Bernadette Kelly
- Running time: 73 minutes
- Production company: MarVista Entertainment

Original release
- Network: Hallmark Channel
- Release: April 21, 1996

Captains Courageous is a 1996 American film directed by Michael Anderson for the Family Channel. It was an adaptation of the novel by Rudyard Kipling that had been filmed several times.

The film starred Robert Urich who wanted to make a movie he could watch with his children.

The Los Angeles Times called it "terrific".

== Cast ==
- Robert Urich as Capt. Matthew Troop
- Kenny Vadas as Harvey Cheyne, Jr.
- Kaj-Erik Eriksen as Dan Troop
- Robert Wisden as Arthur Wayne
- Duncan Fraser as Long Jack
- Sandra Nelson as Mary Ann Troop
- Terence Kelly as Ted the Foul Up
- Colin Cunningham as Manuel
