= Roger Fournier =

Canadian writer and television director

- Born: October 22, 1929; Saint-Anaclet, Quebec, Canada
- Died: May 31, 2012 (aged 82); Montreal, Quebec, Canada
- Occupations: novelist, short story writer, screenwriter, television director
- Writing career
- Language: French
- Years active: 1960s-1990s
- Notable works: Le cercle des arènes, A Day in a Taxi
- Notable awards: Governor General's Award for French-language fiction, Prix France-Québec

Roger Fournier (October 22, 1929 - May 31, 2012) was a Canadian writer and television director. He was most noted for his novel Le cercle des arènes, which won the Governor General's Award for French-language fiction and the Prix France-Québec in 1982, and his screenplay for the film A Day in a Taxi (Une journée en taxi), for which he received a Genie Award nomination for Best Original Screenplay in 1983.

He was a longtime television director for Télévision de Radio-Canada, including on the series Moi et l'autre and Bye Bye, and assisted in creating Gilles Vigneault's first concert tour.

== Filmography ==
- Inutile et adorable (1963)
- À nous deux! (1965)
- Les Filles à Mounne (1966)
- Journal d'un jeune marié (1967)
- La voix (1968)
- L'innocence d'Isabelle (1969)
- Heads or Tails (Pile ou face) - 1971
- Gilles Vigneault, mon ami (1972)
- La marche des grands cocus (1972)
- Moi, mon corps, mon âme, Montréal, etc. (1974)
- Les cornes sacrées (1977)
- Pour l'amour de Sawinne (1984)
- Les sirènes du Saint-Laurent (1984)
- Chair Satan (1989)
- La Danse éternelle (1991)
- Le retour de Sawinne (1992)
- Gaïagyne (1994)
- Les mauvaises pensées (1996)
- Le pied - contes érotiques et très cruels (1996)
- Le Stomboat (1999)
- Les miroirs de mes nuits (2000)
