= Mark Urman =

American film executive, producer, and distributor (1952–2019)

- Born: November 24, 1952; The Bronx, New York City, U.S.
- Died: January 12, 2019 (aged 66); Newark, New Jersey, U.S.
- Occupations: Film executive, producer and distributor
- Spouse: Deborah Dean Davis
- Children: Cleo Davis-Urman & Oliver Davis-Urman

Mark Arnold Urman (November 24, 1952 – January 12, 2019) was an American film executive, producer and distributor of independent films.
