= Shades of Love (film series) =

Canadian film series

Shades of Love is a collection of romantic and dramatic made-for-television and direct-to-video films. The films paired well-known leading men with lesser known Canadian actresses. Aired in Canada and sold individually on VHS in North America, the Shades of Love film series was geared towards females who bought romance novels. Each title featured a popular love song that appeared as part of the soundtrack. Some of the later titles were paired with older ones and sold as "A Double Feature Romance".

It was distributed on home video by Lorimar Home Video (formerly Karl/Lorimar Home Video) in the United States, and aired on television on Astral's First Choice cable channel, and had novelization tie-ins from Cloverdale Press, and had a budget of $1 million per episode from the series. It was produced by L/A House Productions, which paid $400,000 million to make the movies.

== Titles ==
No.	Title	Directed by	Written by	Original release date
1	Shades of Love: Make Mine Chartreuse	Jim Kaufman	Julian Roffman, Gilles Savard	February 1, 1987
Rosemary (Catherine Colvey), an energetic and prosperous executive, orders her driver to buy 2 bottles of chartreuse To impress a difficult client. After setting up a meeting with the client, she goes to a bookstore where, She meets Steve Grady (Joseph Bottoms), whose books she also loves, and falls for their author's charm and wit. But both are workaholics and their professional and emotional lives are difficult to reconcile. During one of the rare weekends they spend together, the lovers discover how deeply they care for one another. Still, Rosemary continues to resist. When she finally gives in, they drink to it with chartreuse.
2	Shades of Love: Lilac Dream	Marc F. Voizard	Julian Roffman	April 23, 1987
Tamara (Susan Almgren), a young advertising executive, retreats to an island to nurse a broken heart. During the first night there is a violent storm. In the morning, Tamara finds a young man (Dack Rambo) lying wounded and unconscious on the beach. She takes him back to her cottage and when he wakes it is evident he has amnesia. As the days go by, she falls in love with him. They are happy in their love until Matt's inevitable departure leaves Tamara heartsick once again. He must find out who the woman is who claims to be his wife. Nevertheless, Tamara returns to work strong in the conviction that love, however brief, is worth the pain it costs. As it turns out Matt's wife Joanna was about to leave him. He left on the boat to think things over and went straight into the storm. Once back at home Joanna in her usual indecisive way wants him back. Matt knows what he must do and leaves Joanna for good. Matt's unexpected return to Tamara shows her that such happiness can last.
3	Shades of Love: The Rose Cafe	Danièle J. Suissa	Julian Roffman	May 21, 1987
Courtney (Linda Smith) is head chef in a prestigious restaurant. She has a dream that is on the verge of realization: with the help of her fiancé, Mike (Damir Andrei), she will soon open her own restaurant, the Rose Café. The work is going well and the wedding day is approaching when an old classmate, Josh (Parker Stevenson), rekindles a spark of love she doesn't feel for her future husband. Courtney realizes she must face this painful emotional dilemma before she can bring her professional ambitions to fruition. She solves it with determination.
4	Shades of Love: Sincerely, Violet	Mort Ransen	Julian Roffman	June 18, 1987
Mark Jamieson (Simon MacCorkindale) is standing in the way of research being conducted by Elizabeth Prentice (Patricia Phillips), a history professor. He refuses to let her have a document that she knows is essential to her theory. Taking up a challenge from her best friend, Jane, she decides to get the document by burglarizing Mark's house. She is caught in the act. Jane comes to the rescue, representing her to be Violet, a patient under observation. Thus begins a rather complicated story between Mark and the double personality of Elizabeth/Violet. Mark falls in love with Violet, but she writes him a farewell note thanking him for all he has taught her. Elizabeth finally meets Mark as herself and they spend the weekend together investigating her theory and falling in love with each other. Mark often brings up Violet in conversation since but that only angers the professor. She feels he wants to be with Violet, her sexy alter-ego, and not her. It comes to a head when Elizabeth finally reveals to Mark that she is in fact Violet. Mark cannot handle the lies and leaves disappointed and hurt. Time passes and one day Elizabeth gets a message from Mark saying he loves them both. Liz meets Mark at the hotel where they fell in love and they reconnect. Mark is changed man who sees the real value in people and Elizabeth finally gets out of her rut as a stodgy researcher.
5	Shades of Love: Champagne for Two	Lewis Furey	Julian Roffman, Amelia Hass	July 16, 1987
Cody (Kristen Bishop) is a promising architect. Her career comes before all else. The arrival of an unexpected housemate and his dog upsets the normal course of her busy life. Vincent (Nicholas Campbell) is the chef on a televised cooking program. Since he brings his work home at night, he is soon taking care of his housemate, and Cody is entranced by his infectious laugh and attentions. Then she's offered an important assignment in Philadelphia, where she must go for an extended period. But an old flame of Vincent's has begun to show she will stop at nothing to get him back. Cody breaks it off with Vincent but misses him desperately. She can't avoid him since he has become a huge celebrity. One night, Vincent breaks back into the apartment and makes a proposal to Cody. His boss has agreed to produce his new syndicated cooking show from Philadelphia. Will she take him back? They toast their new life together with champagne.
6	Shades of Love: The Garnet Princess	Danièle J. Suissa	Julian Roffman	September 17, 1987
Stacey (Liliane Clune) is a fashion designer. She is not only successful, but fulfilled in her occupation. On the eve of her first fashion show, she meets Jonathan (Jean LeClerc), a private detective who reveals that she is the long-sought heiress of a European throne. An orphan since childhood, she resists the temptation to discover her real past. Still, her curiosity about Jonathan plunges her into an investigation of her own.
7	Shades of Love: The Ballerina and the Blues	Glenn Bydwell	Tannis Kobrin	November 19, 1987
Suffering from a leg injury, Andrea (Tamara Chaplin) gives up her career as a ballerina to found her own dance company in the city core. She adores the work her new company demands of her, but as she works she is constantly disturbed by the rowdy music played by her neighbor Rick (Rex Smith), a blues guitarist. But soon Rick is charming Andrea and gradually he becomes her confidant. Their blossoming love is in peril, however, because Andrea is encountering great difficulty in founding the new company. She is on the verge of resuming her former career. Rick's reaction to the new plan convinces her that she will have to be determined if she is ever going to be successful in launching her own company. They team up in a concert combining modern dance and jazz, backed by Rick's guitar playing. It is a huge success and the couple realizes that despite their different backgrounds, what a great pair they are.
8	Shades of Love: Echoes in Crimson	Caryl J. Wickman	Julian Roffman, Jan Franklin	December 17, 1987
Anne (Patty Talbot), an art historian, takes a job in a prestigious big-city gallery. Soon Grant (Greg Evigan), a former lover, turns up and tries to win her back. But Anne still harbors a strong distrust of him and decides to devote herself totally to her work. At the gallery, she manages to uncover the mystery behind a murder and a smuggling plot by her boss. Grant appears in the nick of time to save her from harm's way. He also becomes her latest find and a celebrated new artist. At a showing of his work at the gallery, Grant surprises Anne with his latest work...a neon sculpture of Grouch Marx saying "I Love You". Anne gets the love she lost so many years ago and a new career as gallery manager.
9	Shades of Love: Moonlight Flight	Jim Kaufman	Cajun Bloom, George Arthur Bloom	April 14, 1988
Anxious to get a fledgling company off the ground, Shelley Robbins (Elizabeth M. Mason) and her partners search for star talent to record an album on their company's label. Acting on a desperate whim, Shelley heads for Cutswaga Valley, where reclusive musician Tommy Rivers (Peter Reckell) has resided since recording a hit album a few years ago. Meeting the elusive Rivers poses a great challenge, as Shelley confronts suspicious residents and tries her best to win over the private and strong-willed musician. Shelley finds herself lured from the sameness of her career into the idyllic world of a man of strength and vision. Based on a story by Serita Deborah Stevens.
10	Shades of Love: Indigo Autumn	Stuart Gillard	Stuart Gillard	May 12, 1988
This is the story of a young widow (Lisa Schrage)who, determined not to risk love again, suddenly finds herself drawn to an attractive older man (Marc Singer). Based on a story by Barbera Cameron.
11	Shades of Love: Sunset Court	Marc F. Voizard	George Arthur Bloom	June 16, 1988
This is the story of Susie Majors (Elizabeth Bellm), a top-ranked tennis star who is reaching the climax of her career. With her health failing and the tennis crown just in sight, her doctor, Jimmy Fielding (Ted Wass), cautions that continual playing could seriously damage her health. As the competition mounts, Susie realizes that she is in love with the doctor. He is not like any man she has ever known. He's sensitive, sweet, funny, and cares about her beyond her tennis career. She is torn between her love for him and her passion to win the last great match. He wants her to quit playing immediately and she cannot see a life without tennis. To make matters worse, Susie's old lover and coach continually taunts her with his newest find, a young up-and-coming star who could beat Susie. As it turns out, the young ingenue is Susie's competitor in the final match. It is hard battle but Susie wins and stays with her good doctor.
12	Shades of Love: The Man Who Guards the Greenhouse	Marc F. Voizard	George Arthur Bloom	July 21, 1988
Tracy Cummings (Rebecca Dewey) is a serious writer stuck on a meaningless project. Jeff Green (Christopher Cazenove) is a charismatic wildlife photographer concerned with Africa's shrinking habitat. When they meet, Tracy is confronted not only by her desire to again write meaningfully, but also by her overwhelming attraction to Jeff. She reconciles these passions in a tale of the ultimate triumph of truth and love. Based on a story by Pat Dalton.
13	Shades of Love: Tangerine Taxi	Mort Ransen	Mort Ransen	August 18, 1988
Dr. Evan Moore (Roberta Weiss) is a twenty-five-year-old scientist working on a research project to study possible causes of Alzheimer's disease. Expected at an important medical foundation meeting, Evan takes a taxi (a 1936 tangerine-colored Buick Classic) to get to the airport on time. But traffic tie-ups and car trouble force Evan to miss her flight. Eager to find out more about her handsome driver (Marshall Colt), Evan accepts his invitation to dinner when she must wait another day to get a flight out of town.
14	Shades of Love: The Emerald Tear	Mort Ransen	George Arthur Bloom	September 22, 1988
Journalist Jayne Manley (Leah Pinsent) tries to get back the job she lost. She leaves to investigate a millionaire (Ed Marinaro) who is rumored to have bought a precious gem, the Emerald Tear. If she can find proof of this, the scoop would ensure a new job at the newspaper. But Jayne and Edward fall madly in love and the secret of her true identity is revealed.
15	Shades of Love: Little White Lies	Susan Martin	Marilyn Lightstone	October 20, 1988
Lawyer Lilian Reynolds (Linda Smith) would like to become a judge, an ambition which obliges her to work hard during a complex trial—at least, that is, until she falls hopelessly in love with Roberto Fiori (Duncan Regehr), a cabinet maker who is remodeling her office. Roberto threatens Lilly's career, but Lilly is not concerned about this as she overcomes the social barriers posed by their love.
16	Shades of Love: Midnight Magic	George Mihalka	Tannis Kobrin	November 17, 1988
Mary Calhoun (Jennifer Dale) gives advice to the lovelorn on her open line radio program. With a successful radio show and a published book behind her, she is offered a chance to work in television. Mary returns to Alma, the town where she studied, to arrive at her decision. In the university studio she meets Anthony Palmer (James Wilder), a student fifteen years her junior, with whom she becomes romantically involved.

== Soundtrack ==
A soundtrack released on vinyl and cassette tape featured songs from many of the films in the series.

Track Listing:

- "Tonight, I Celebrate My Love" – Peabo Bryson and Roberta Flack (from Sincerely, Violet)
- "Baby, Come to Me" – James Ingram & Patti Austin (from Lilac Dream)
- "You are My Lady" – Freddie Jackson (from The Garnet Princess)
- "You're A Part Of Me" – Gene Cotton & Kim Carnes (from The Rose Cafe)
- "Every Time I See Your Picture" – Luba (from Champagne For Two)
- "We've Got Tonight" – Kenny Rogers and Sheena Easton (from Make Mine Chartreuse)
- "The Sweetest Thing (I've Ever Known)" – Juice Newton (from Echoes In Crimson)
- "Wildflower" – Skylark
- "Always Saying Goodbye" – Rex Smith lyrics by Kenneth Atchity (from The Ballerina and The Blues)
- "Moonlight Flight" – lyrics by Kenneth Atchity (from Moonlight Flight)
- "The Queen of Walls" – lyrics by Kenneth Atchity (from The Garnet Princess)
- "Shades of Love (Theme)" – Lewis Furey
- "Joy to the World" is used in Echoes In Crimson.
- "Good King Wenceslas" is used in Midnight Magic.
- Music from the operas Mefistophile and Madama Butterfly was featured in Little White Lies
- "Jamaica Farewell", a traditional calypso tune, was used in Make Mine Chartreuse'
- The 3rd movement of the Haydn Trumpet Concerto in E flat was used in Sincerely, Violet.
- The 1st movement of Vivaldi's Violin Concerto in A minor RV356 was used in Midnight Magic.
- The song "Nothing Can Stand In Your Way" by Zappacosta was featured in Sunset Court but not included in the soundtrack release.
- The song "Cruisin'" – by Smokey Robinson was featured in The Emerald Tear but not included in the soundtrack release.
- The song "I Just Fall In Love Again" – by Anne Murray was featured in Tangerine Taxi but not included in the soundtrack release.
- The song "The One By Your Side" by Chantal Condor was featured in Little White Lies but not included in the soundtrack release.
- The song "When a Man Loves a Woman" – covered by Luba, was featured in Midnight Magic but not included in the soundtrack release.
- The song "Riptide" – by Robert Palmer was featured in Indigo Autumn but not included in the soundtrack release.
- The song "Can't We Try" – by Dan Hill and Vonda Shepard was featured in The Man Who Guards The Greenhouse but not included in the soundtrack release.
- In addition to performing "Always Saying Goodbye", Rex Smith also performed "Bourbon Street" in The Ballerina and the Blues.

== Allusions ==
- In Echoes In Crimson Grant mentions the film Duck Soup, does an impersonation of Groucho Marx, and reads lines to Anne from William Shakespeare's Twelfth Night.
- In Echoes In Crimson the film It's a Wonderful Life plays on the television.
