= Valérie (film) =

- Film poster
- Directed by: Denis Héroux
- Written by: John Dunning (scenario); Louis Gauthier (dialogue); Denis Héroux (idea); André Link (scenario); Richard Sadler (scenario)
- Produced by: John Dunning; André Link
- Starring: Danielle Ouimet; Guy Godin
- Cinematography: René Verzier
- Edited by: Jean LaFleur
- Music by: Joe Gracy; Michel Paje
- Production company: Cinépix
- Distributed by: Cinépix
- Release date: 2 May 1969
- Running time: 96 minutes
- Country: Canada
- Language: French
- Budget: $99,000
- Box office: $2 million

Valérie is a 1969 black-and-white Canadian erotic film directed by Denis Héroux. It was the first Quebec film to show nudity. It turned an unprecedented gross of $1.68 million, making it the highest-grossing Canadian film of its time.

== Plot ==
Valérie, upon leaving a convent with the leader of a motorcycle gang, discovers the hippie culture of Montreal and turns to prostitution. This improbable storyline, made famous by the frank display of nudity and sexuality, came from a culture that was still labouring under a strong sense of Catholic guilt. It was the first of a group of films known as maple-syrup porn.

== Cast ==
- Danielle Ouimet as Valérie
- Guy Godin as Patrick Vollant - le peintre
- Andrée Flamand as Andrée
- Kim Wilcox as Kim
- Claude Préfontaine as Le riche playboy
- Henri Norbert as Le millionnaire décadent
- Michel Paje as Le premier client de Valérie
- Clémence DesRochers as La travailleuse sociale

== Production ==
Valérie was filmed in August and September 1968, with a budget of $99,000 (equivalent to $864,670 in 2025).

== Release ==
The film was released in Montreal on 2 May 1969, by Cinépix, the producer and distributor. It was the highest-grossing of all-time in Canada with a gross of $1,684,000 and earned $2 million (equivalent to $16,670,051 in 2025) after being shown in forty countries. It was the most attended Quebec film since Little Aurore's Tragedy. The film was seen by 153,734 people in France.

== See also ==
- Nudity in film

== Works cited ==
- Turner, D. John, ed. (1987). Canadian Feature Film Index: 1913-1985. Canadian Film Institute. ISBN 0660533642.
- Melnyk, George (2004). One Hundred Years of Canadian Cinema. University of Toronto Press. ISBN 080203568X.
- Marshall, Bill (2001). Quebec National Cinema. McGill–Queen's University Press. ISBN 0-7735-2103-8.
