= North Shore Studios =

Film studio, previous Lionsgate Studios until 2016

Coordinates: 49°18′41.34″N 123°2′30.22″W

- Company type: Subsidiary
- Industry: Film studio
- Headquarters: North Vancouver, British Columbia, Canada
- Key people: Amy Lang (president)
- Parent: Bosa Development
- Website: nsstudios.ca

North Shore Studios, formerly Lions Gate Studios, is a film studio located in North Vancouver, British Columbia, Canada, previously owned by Lions Gate Entertainment, or simply Lionsgate, until it was acquired by Bosa Development in 2006.

There are 8 stages totaling 132,435 square feet ranging from 11,000 to 20,000 square feet as well as streetscape. There is also 100,000 square feet of office space.

== Productions ==
=== Films ===
- Rocky IV (1985)
- Look Who's Talking (1989)
- Look Who's Talking Too (1990)
- Ernest Rides Again (1993)
- Little Women (1994)
- Slam Dunk Ernest (1995)
- Jumanji (1995)
- Reindeer Games (2000)
- Romeo Must Die (2000)
- The 6th Day (2000)
- Along Came a Spider (2001)
- The Santa Clause 2 (2002)
- It's a Very Merry Muppet Christmas Movie (2002)
- Agent Cody Banks (2003)
- Willard (2003)
- X2 (2003)
- Scary Movie 3 (2003)
- Scooby-Doo 2: Monsters Unleashed (2004)
- White Chicks (2004)
- I, Robot (2004)
- Catwoman (2004)
- The Final Cut (2004)
- Elektra (2005)
- The Muppets' Wizard of Oz (2005)
- Fantastic Four (2005)
- An Unfinished Life (2005)
- The Fog (2005)
- Final Destination 3 (2006)
- She's the Man (2006)
- Scary Movie 4 (2006)
- RV (2006)
- X-Men: The Last Stand (2006)
- Night at the Museum (2006)
- Man About Town (2007)
- Shooter (2007)
- Fantastic Four: Rise of the Silver Surfer (2007)
- Good Luck Chuck (2007)
- Why Did I Get Married? (2007)
- Things We Lost in the Fire (2007)
- Juno (2007)
- Aliens vs. Predator: Requiem (2007)
- The X-Files: I Want to Believe (2008)
- Elegy (2008)
- Night at the Museum: Battle of the Smithsonian (2009)
- I Love You, Beth Cooper (2009)
- Jennifer's Body (2009)
- Trick 'r Treat (2009)
- 2012 (2009)
- The Twilight Saga: New Moon (2009)
- Tooth Fairy (2010)
- Percy Jackson & the Olympians: The Lightning Thief (2010)
- Diary of a Wimpy Kid (2010)
- Ramona and Beezus (2010)
- Marmaduke (2010)
- The A-Team (2010)
- Charlie St. Cloud (2010)
- Case 39 (2010)
- Diary of a Wimpy Kid: Rodrick Rules (2011)
- Rise of the Planet of the Apes (2011)
- Apollo 18 (2011)
- The Big Year (2011)
- The Thing (2011)
- The Twilight Saga: Breaking Dawn – Part 1 (2011)
- Alvin and the Chipmunks: Chipwrecked (2011)
- Mission: Impossible – Ghost Protocol (2011)
- This Means War (2012)
- The Cabin in the Woods (2012)
- LOL (2012)
- The Twilight Saga: Breaking Dawn – Part 2 (2012)
- Man of Steel (2013)
- Percy Jackson: Sea of Monsters (2013)
- Godzilla (2014)
- If I Stay (2014)
- Night at the Museum: Secret of the Tomb (2014)
- Big Eyes (2014)
- The Interview (2014)
- Fifty Shades of Grey (2015)
- Splitting Adam (2015)
- Tomorrowland (2015)
- Descendants (2015)
- The Revenant (2015)
- Deadpool (2016)
- The BFG (2016)
- Fifty Shades Darker (2017)
- Okja (2017)
- War for the Planet of the Apes (2017)
- Birth of the Dragon (2017)
- Death Note (2017)
- Fifty Shades Freed (2018)
- Overboard (2018)
- Deadpool 2 (2018)
- The Predator (2018)
- Bad Times at the El Royale (2018)
- Light of My Life (2019)
- Playing with Fire (2019)
- Sonic the Hedgehog (2020)
- The Christmas Chronicles 2 (2020)
- Snake Eyes (2021)
- Antlers (2021)
- Peter Pan & Wendy (2023)
- Tron: Legacy (2025)

=== Television Shows ===
- 21 Jump Street (1987-91)
- The X-Files (1993-2018)
- The Sentinel (1996-99)
- Millennium (1996-99)
- Dark Angel (2000-02)
- Tru Calling (2003-05)
- The 4400 (2004-07)
- Battlestar (2004-09)
- Kyle XY (2006-09)
- Blade: The Series (2006)
- Psych (2006-14)
- Men in Trees (2006-08)
- 90210 (2008-13)
- V (2009)
- Tower Prep (2010)
- Human Target (2010-11)
- Falling Skies (2011-15)
- The Secret Circle (2011-12)
- Alcatraz (2012)
- Level Up (2012-13)
- Arrow (2012)
- Emily Owens, M.D. (2012-13)
- Cult (2013)
- Mistresses (2013-16)
- King & Maxwell (2013)
- The Tomorrow People (2013-14)
- Once Upon a Time in Wonderland (2013-14)
- Backstrom (2015)
- iZombie (2015-19)
- Unreal (2015)
- Zoo (2015-17)
- Minority Report (2015)
- Impastor (2015-16)
- No Tomorrow (2016-17)
- The Arrangement (2017-18)
- Salvation (2017-18)
- The Twilight Zone (2019-20)
- The InBetween (2019)
- Nancy Drew (2019-23)
- The Healing Powers of Dude (2020)
- Away (2020)
- The Barbarian and the Troll (2021)
- The Mysterious Benedict Society (Season One)
- Schmigadoon! (2021-23)
- Invasion (2021-Present)
- Peacemaker (Season One)
- Grease: Rise of the Pink Ladies (2023)
- Percy Jackson and the Olympians (2023-Present)
- Shōgun (2024-Present)
- The Spiderwick Chronicles (2024)
- The Recruit (Season Two)
- Happy Face (2025)
- Untamed (2025-Present)
