= John Dunning (film producer) =

Canadian film producer

- Born: April 27, 1927; Verdun, Quebec, Canada
- Died: September 19, 2011 (aged 84); Montreal, Quebec, Canada
- Occupation: Film producer
- Years active: 1969-2009
- Known for: Cinépix

John Dunning (April 27, 1927 – September 19, 2011) was Canadian film producer and distributor. He is considered a pioneer of commercial Canadian cinema, as the co-founder of Cinépix Film Properties with André Link.

Dunning produced early works by notable Canadian directors David Cronenberg and Ivan Reitman. Their biggest commercial success—and the first Canadian box office hit—came with Reitman's Meatballs (1979). Cronenberg described him as the "godfather of an entire generation of Canadian filmmakers."

== Early life ==
Dunning was born in the Greater Montreal district of Verdun—and into the film business. Dunning's father Mickey toured Quebec screening newsreel footage and later owned several cinemas. By the age of 13, John was working the candy counter at his family's Century Theatre in adjacent Ville-Émard. Upon his father's death several years later, Dunning managed the cinema, beginning a lifelong career in film.

== Career ==
Dunning launched Cinépix with partner André Link in Montreal in the early 1960s. Initially a distribution company, Cinépix's first production was the 1969 erotic drama Valérie, which earned $1 million at the box office. Over the next number of years the firm produced a number of sex comedy films, including Here and Now (L'Initiation), Love in a Four Letter World, Heads or Tails (Pile ou face) and Oh, If Only My Monk Would Want (Ah! Si mon moine voulait...), which were labelled as "maple syrup porn" and saw Dunning compared to a Canadian Roger Corman.

Cinépix produced early work by David Cronenberg (Shivers) and Ivan Reitman (Meatballs). The company also distributed art-house films including the grunge rock documentary Hype, Vincent Gallo's Buffalo '66, and SICK: The Life & Death of Bob Flanagan, Supermasochist.

From 1989 to 1994, Cinépix was partners with Famous Players in C/FP Distribution, which was renamed Cinépix Film Properties (C/FP). In 1994, Cinépix bought Famous Players' stake in the organization.

By 1997, Cinépix had a New York-based U.S. distribution arm and owned 56 percent of Ciné-Groupe, an animated film production company.

Lions Gate Entertainment Corporation (LGEC) was formed in 1997 by Frank Giustra, a banker. LGEC purchased Cinépix and kept its leadership; Dunning, in turn, left the company. Cinépix was renamed Lions Gate Films on January 13, 1998.

Dunning and Link were honoured for their contributions to the Canadian film industry at the 14th Genie Awards and were inducted into the Canadian Film and Television Hall of Fame in 2007.

== Legacy ==
In June 2011, shortly before his death in September of that year, the Toronto Film Critics Association announced that Dunning would receive its Clyde Gilmour Award for lifetime achievement, with Cronenberg stating that "John Dunning is the unacknowledged godfather of an entire generation of Canadian filmmakers. I still consider him my movie mentor." The award was posthumously presented to Dunning's son Greg, at a ceremony in January 2012.

Dunning's memoirs, You're Not Dead until You're Forgotten, were published in 2014 by McGill-Queen's University Press.

In 2016, the Canadian Screen Awards introduced the new John Dunning Discovery Award, presented to honour the year's best Canadian microbudget film. In 2019, it was merged with the former Claude Jutra Award, presented for the year's best debut film by a first-time director, into the contemporary John Dunning Best First Feature Award.
