= Peggy Clarke =

Peggy Clarke or Peggy Clark may refer to:

- Peggy Clark (1915–1996), American lighting designer, costume designer, and set designer
- Peggy Clarke (chess player) (1926–2018), joint British ladies' chess champion
- Peggy Clarke, an actress in No Way Back
- Peggy Clark, a fictional character in 3-D Man stories in Marvel Comics

== See also ==
- Margaret Clark (disambiguation)
- Margaret Clarke (disambiguation)
