= Switch (1991 film) =

1991 film by Blake Edwards

- Theatrical release poster
- Directed by: Blake Edwards
- Written by: Blake Edwards
- Based on: Goodbye Charlie; 1959 play by George Axelrod Goodbye Charlie; 1964 film by Vincente Minnelli
- Produced by: Tony Adams
- Starring: Ellen Barkin; Jimmy Smits; JoBeth Williams; Lorraine Bracco
- Cinematography: Dick Bush
- Edited by: Robert Pergament
- Music by: Henry Mancini; Don Grady
- Color process: Technicolor
- Production companies: HBO; Cinema Plus L.P.
- Distributed by: Warner Bros. (North America); Odyssey/Regency (International)
- Release date: May 10, 1991
- Running time: 103 minutes
- Country: United States
- Language: English
- Budget: $14 million
- Box office: $15.5 million

Switch is a 1991 American fantasy comedy film written and directed by Blake Edwards. Based on the 1959 George Axelrod play Goodbye Charlie, as well as the 1964 film Goodbye Charlie, the film stars Ellen Barkin, Jimmy Smits, JoBeth Williams, and Lorraine Bracco.

== Plot ==
Advertising man Steve Brooks (Perry King) — a womanizer and chauvinist — is invited to a surprise party by three former lovers: Margo Bronfman (JoBeth Williams), Liz (Lysette Anthony), and Felicia (Victoria Mahoney), who attempt to drown him in the hot tub. When they do not succeed at drowning Steve, he lunges at them. Margo then shoots Steve in the chest, killing him.

In purgatory, God (communicating through male (Richard Provost) and female (Linda Gary) voices) gives Steve one chance at redemption. He is to return to Earth in a new body, and is told that he must find a female who truly loves him. If he fails, he will go to Hell. The Devil (Bruce Payne) convinces God to give Steve a challenge, and Steve finds himself returned to the living, transformed into a beautiful woman, Amanda (Ellen Barkin). Amanda soon visits Margo, convinces her that she is Steve, and persuades her to give her lessons in being a woman.

Telling everyone that Steve has run off and that she is his half-sister, Amanda slowly takes over Steve's old life, convincing the boss at the advertising agency to give Amanda Steve's job if Amanda can obtain the advertising account of lesbian cosmetics magnate Sheila Faxton (Lorraine Bracco).

Amanda then tries to use her new female body as a weapon in her campaign to get the advertising account and fulfill the bet between God and the Devil, winning a woman's love. Sheila responds with an attraction to Amanda, but Amanda balks on following through on the seduction. She breaks up with Sheila, telling her that the romance was contrived, and meant only to get her as a client.

When Amanda prays to God for help, the Devil offers her a job with his operation. Amanda refuses the Devil's offer, and proceeds to call all of the names in Steve's address book, attempting to find a woman who has something kind to say about him. Instead she discovers how hated Steve is, and how deeply she, in her former life as Steve, damaged countless women.

Steve's former best friend, Walter Stone (Jimmy Smits), has been attracted to Amanda from their first meeting. When despair sends Amanda on an alcoholic bender, Walter joins her. They get drunk together, and Amanda convinces Walter that she is Steve. One night after a bar fight, they get drunk and fall asleep in the same bed.

In the morning, Amanda has no memory of the encounter, accusing Walter of raping her while she was passed out (something she, as Steve, would have done). Walter is astonished, insisting that she was not only awake but an enthusiastic participant. Amanda recognizes the difference between the man she used to be as Steve and the far better man that Walter is.

Meanwhile, Steve's body has been found in the river, and Margo plants her gun in Amanda's sofa, framing her for the crime.

When Amanda is found psychologically unfit for trial, she is committed to a mental hospital, whereupon she learns she is pregnant with Walter's child. Walter proposes, and Amanda reluctantly accepts. They get married, and, months later, Amanda carries Walter's baby to term: a girl. The infant, a female, gazes at her mother with true love. Amanda then dies immediately following childbirth, having secured a place in Heaven.

Upon arriving in Heaven, Amanda must decide whether to spend eternity as a male or a female angel. She finds the decision difficult, and delays her decision; five years later, Amanda/Steve watches from Heaven as Walter and their daughter bring flowers to her grave, and still cannot decide. God (in dual male and female voices), reassures Amanda that she has eternity to decide.

== Cast ==
- Ellen Barkin as Amanda Brooks
- Jimmy Smits as Walter Stone
- JoBeth Williams as Margo Brofman
- Lorraine Bracco as Sheila Faxton
- Tony Roberts as Arnold Freidkin
- Perry King as Steve Brooks
- Bruce Martyn Payne as The Devil
- Lysette Anthony as Liz
- Victoria Mahoney as Felicia
- Basil Hoffman as Higgins
- Catherine Keener as Steve's Secretary
- Kevin Kilner as Dan Jones
- Michael Badalucco as Hard Hat
- David Wohl as Attorney Caldwell
- James Harper as Lieutenant Laster
- John Lafayette as Sergeant Phillips
- Téa Leoni as Connie
- Faith Minton as Nancy
- Ben Hartigan as Minister
- Molly Okuneff as the little girl (Steve/Amanda's and Walter's daughter)

God is voiced by Linda Gary and Richard Provost.

== Reception ==
The film received mixed to negative reviews and holds a 26% rating on Rotten Tomatoes from 23 reviews. On Metacritic, the film has a weighted average score of 48 out of 100 based on 23 critics, indicating "mixed or average reviews".

It debuted at No. 2 at the box office behind F/X2. Roger Ebert gave it 2½ out of 4 stars. He saw unfulfilled potential: "If Edwards had somehow found a way to really grapple with the implications of his story - if he had pushed to see how far he could go - Switch might have been a truly revolutionary comedy, on the order of Tootsie but more sexually frank..."

The film was released on VHS on October 2, 1991, by HBO Video. It was first released on DVD on November 21, 2000, also by HBO Home Video.

== Legacy ==
Although Switch was not a success at the box office, Ellen Barkin was nominated for a Golden Globe Award for Best Actress in a Motion Picture - Musical or Comedy for her role at the 49th Golden Globe Awards, while Bruce Payne was described as a "delightfully wicked Satan" by Film Review.

This film was indirectly referenced numerous times throughout the long-running series Mystery Science Theater 3000. In the original television spots for the film, Jimmy Smits' name was announced in an unusual way: "Ellen Barkin. Switch. Jimmy Smits. Starts Friday." The writers of MST3K found it amusing that Smits' name was announced after the title and not announced as "also starring Jimmy Smits" or "with Jimmy Smits", only as "Jimmy Smits". Smits became a running gag on the series: in various episodes, a character of the show would say "Jimmy Smits" whenever the word "switch" was uttered or sometimes for seemingly no reason at all.

== Music ==
The motion picture was supposed to have a soundtrack composed and arranged by Henry Mancini, who shares composer credits with Don Grady, but Mancini's score was ultimately replaced by a variation of Joni Mitchell's song "Both Sides, Now", done by Paul Young/Clannad. Both the unused Mancini score and the pop song soundtrack were produced on CD in 1991, as a result of which two motion picture soundtrack albums exist for the film.

Henry Mancini score

1. "Main Title - Theme from Switch" - 2:10
2. "Something for Pizzi" - 4:00
3. "Amanda and the Devil" - 2:25
4. "Seduction" - 3:17
5. "Dukes" - 3:00
6. "It's All There (Theme from Switch Instrumental)" - 3:22
7. "They Marry" - 3:34
8. "Fashion Show" - 1:42
9. "End Title - Theme from Switch" - 4:30

Pop soundtrack

1. Lyle Lovett - "You Can't Resist It" - 3:05
2. Ronnie Milsap - "Old Habits Are Hard to Break" - 5:32
3. Bruce Hornsby and the Range - "Barren Ground" - 4:53
4. Paul Young/Clannad - "Both Sides, Now" - 5:10
5. Nathalie Archangel - "So Quiet, So Still" - 4:10
6. Pretty Boy Floyd - "Slam Dunk" (written by Quiet Riot and later recorded for their album Down to the Bone and rerecord for Alive and Well) - 2:55
7. Joe Ely - "Are You Listenin' Lucky?" - 3:34
8. Indecent Obsession - "Dream After Dream" - 4:06
9. The Jets - "Sendin' Out a Message" - 4:03
10. Jody Watley - "It's All There" - 2:38
11. Billie Holiday - "Lover Man" - 3:18
