= Margaret Clark =

Margaret Clark may refer to:

- Margaret Clark (arsonist) (died 1680)
- Peggy Clark or Margaret Brownson Clark (1915–1996), American lighting designer, costume designer, and set designer
- M. Margaret Clark (1925–2003), American medical anthropologist
- Margaret Formby née Clark (1929–2003), American educator and founder of the National Cowgirl Museum and Hall of Fame
- Margaret Hayes Clark, American politician
- Margaret Clark (political scientist) (1941–2026), New Zealand professor of politics
- Margaret Clark (Australian writer) (born 1942), Australian author for children and young adults
- Margaret Clark (psychologist) (fl. 1970s–2010s), American social psychologist
- Margaret Clark (American writer) (born 1964), American historian, writer, and educator
- Margaret Goff Clark (1913–2004), American author of children's books
- Maggie Clark (born 2007), Australian cricketer
- Margaret Clark Gillett (1878–1962), née Clark, British botanist, suffragist and social reformer
- Maggie Clark, a character in "When You and I Were Young, Maggie"

== See also ==
- Marguerite Clark (1883–1940), actress
- Margaret Clarke (disambiguation)
- Peggy Clarke (disambiguation)
