= Cheesman Park, Denver =

Urban park in Colorado, US

- Cheesman Park
- U.S. National Register of Historic Places
- U.S. Historic district
- Colorado State Register of Historic Properties
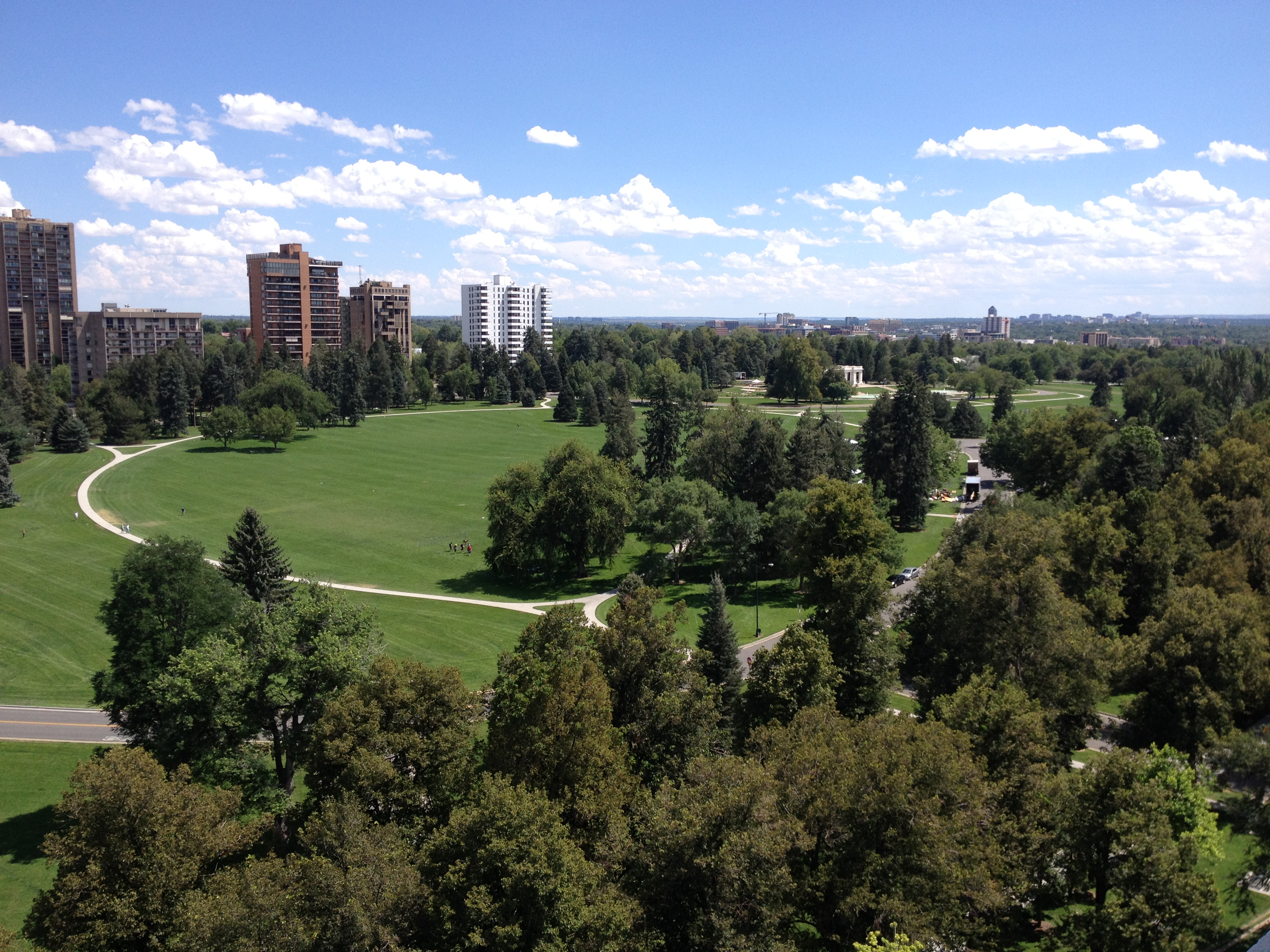
- Looking across the main lawn from the northwest corner.

- Location within Colorado Location within the United States

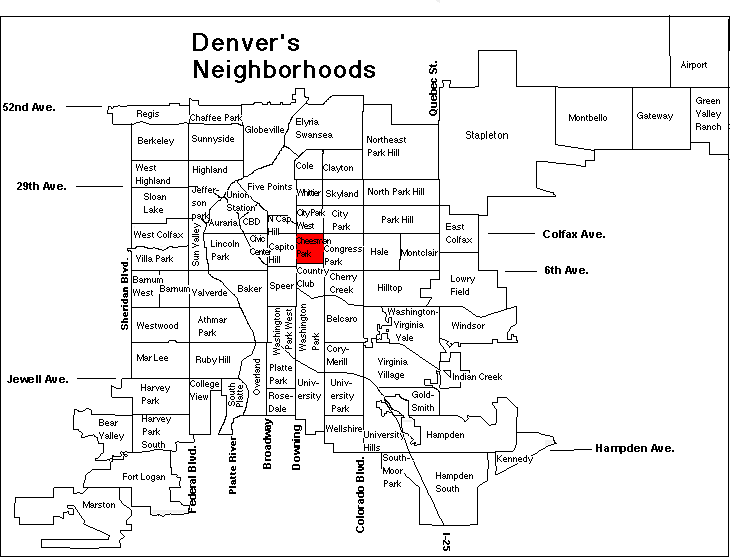
- Cheesman Park highlighted on a map of Denver's neighborhoods.
- Location: Roughly bounded by E. Thirteenth Ave., High St., E. Eighth Ave., and Franklin St., Denver, Colorado
- Coordinates: 39.7328°N 104.9658°W
- Area: 80.7 acres (32.7 ha)
- Built: 1898
- Architects: Reinhard Schuetze, Marean & Norton
- Architectural style: Classical Revival, Mission/Spanish Revival
- MPS: Denver Park and Parkway System TR
- NRHP reference No.: 86002221
- CSRHP No.: 5DV.5308
- Added to NRHP: September 17, 1986

Cheesman Park is an urban park and neighborhood located in the City and County of Denver, Colorado, United States.

== Geography ==
Cheesman Park is located in central Denver, southeast of downtown. The Park has inexact borders, as it is framed on three sides by private residences, but is located in the center of the Cheesman Park neighborhood, between Humboldt Street on the west, Race Street and Denver Botanic Gardens on the east, 13th Avenue on the north, and 8th Avenue on the south. The neighborhood's borders are approximately:

- West: Downing Street
- East: York Street
- North: Colfax Avenue
- South: 8th Avenue

The 80 acres of park land are planted with 1,880 trees from 57 different species. These include groves of American Linden in the western part of the park, American elm, Black Walnut, Green Ash and large conifers like the Colorado blue spruce and Douglas Fir.

== Early park history ==
In the late 19th century, the land that is now Cheesman Park was Prospect Hill Cemetery, which also included the land that is now the Denver Botanical Garden and Congress Park further east. The long-disused cemetery was converted to a park which opened in 1907, after city planners felt it would provide an amenity to new residents as land development moved east of the central city. The park was originally named for the US Congress who gave permission to change the cemetery to a park and was renamed Cheesman Park in honor of Denver pioneer Walter Cheesman whose family donated the funds for the neoclassical pavilion on the eastern side of the park in his honor shortly after his death.

The cemetery opened in 1858 and the first burial occurred the following year. In 1872, the U.S. Government determined that the property upon which the cemetery sat was actually federal land, having been deeded to the government in 1860 by a treaty with the Arapaho. The government then offered the land to the City of Denver who purchased it for $200. Although today it is still mostly remembered as Mt. Prospect Cemetery, in 1873 the cemetery's name was changed to the Denver City Cemetery.

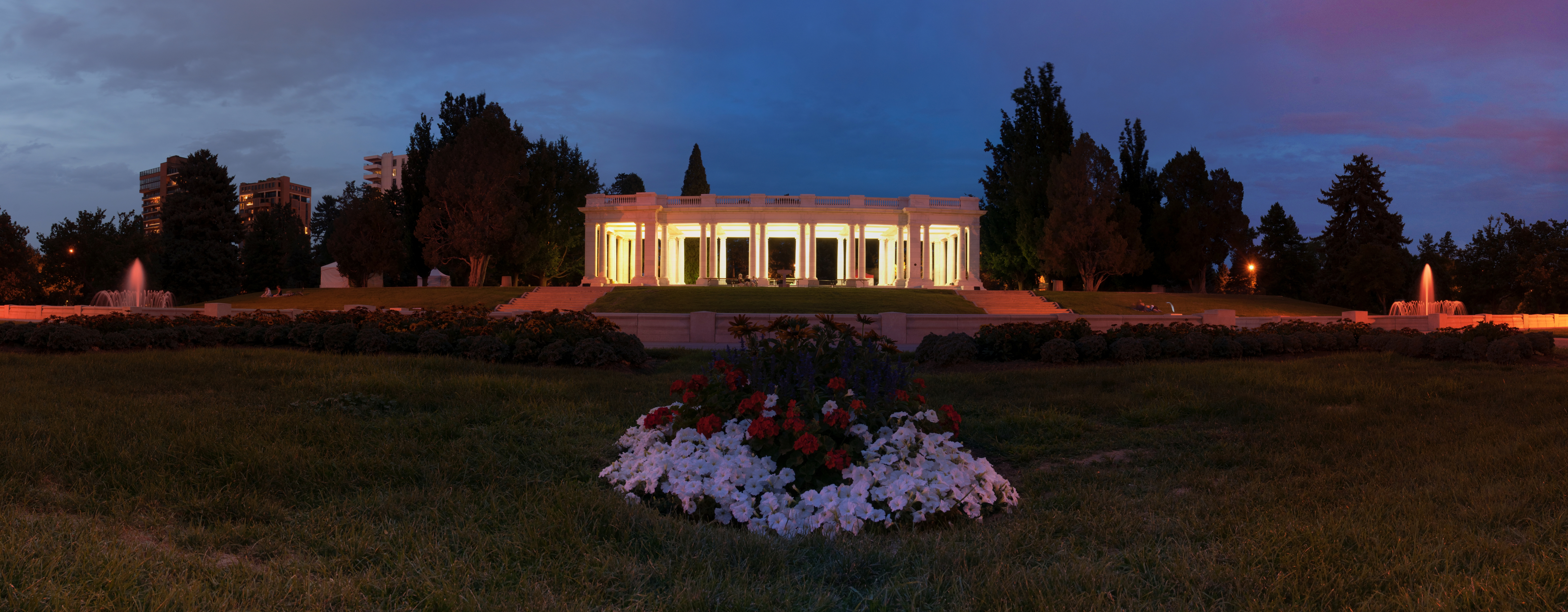
Panorama of the Cheesman Park Pavilion at dusk.

As time went on different areas of the cemetery were designated for different religions, ethnic groups and fraternal organizations such as Odd Fellows, Society of Masons, Roman Catholics, Jewish, the Grand Army of the Republic, and a segregated section at the south end for the Chinese. Some sections were well maintained by family descendants or their organizations, but others were terribly neglected. In 1875, 20 acres (81,000 m^{2}) at the northeast part of the cemetery (slightly east of where the botanic gardens are now located) were sold to the Hebrew Burial Society, who then maintained it, while much of the rest of the graveyard fell further into disrepair. By the late 1880s the cemetery was rarely used and in great disrepair, becoming an eyesore in what had become one of the most exclusive parts of the quickly growing city. Real estate developers soon began to lobby for a park to be in its place, rather than an unused cemetery. Before long, Colorado Senator Henry Moore Teller persuaded the U.S. Congress to allow the old graveyard to be converted to a park. On January 25, 1890, Congress authorized the city to vacate Mt. Prospect Cemetery and in recognition, Teller renamed the area Congress Park.

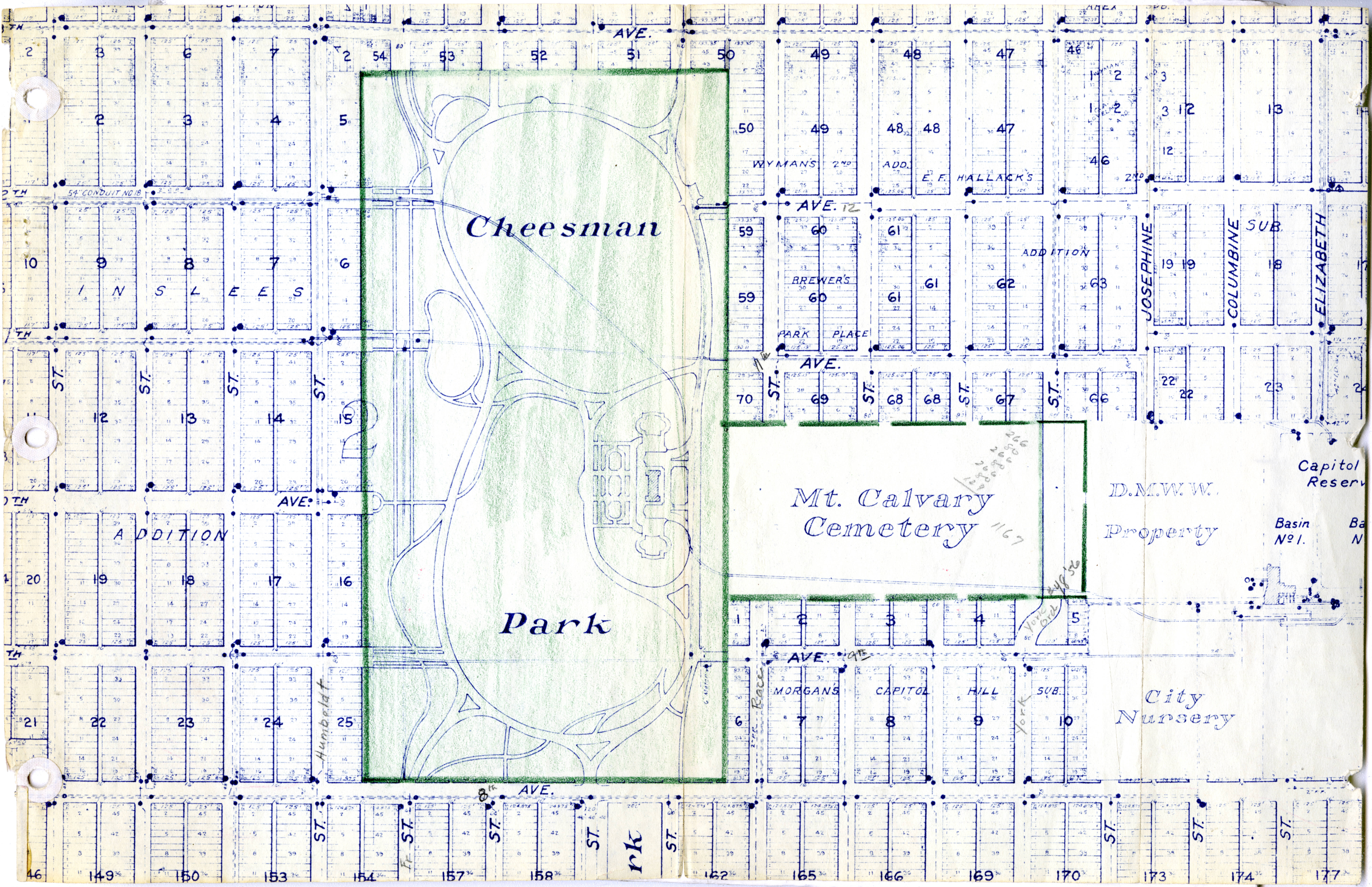
Map detailing the boundaries of Cheesman Park and Mt. Calvary Cemetery with surrounding areas. E 8th Ave & Franklin St., Denver, CO

Families were given 90 days to remove the bodies of their loved ones to other locations. Those who could afford this began to transfer bodies to other cemeteries throughout the city and elsewhere. Due to the large number of graves in the Roman Catholic section off to the east, Mayor Joseph E. Bates sold the 40-acre (160,000 m^{2}) area to the archdiocese, which was then named Mount Calvary Cemetery. The Chinese section of the graveyard was given over to the large population of Chinese who lived in the "Hop Alley" district of Denver. Most of these bodies were then removed and shipped to their homeland of China.

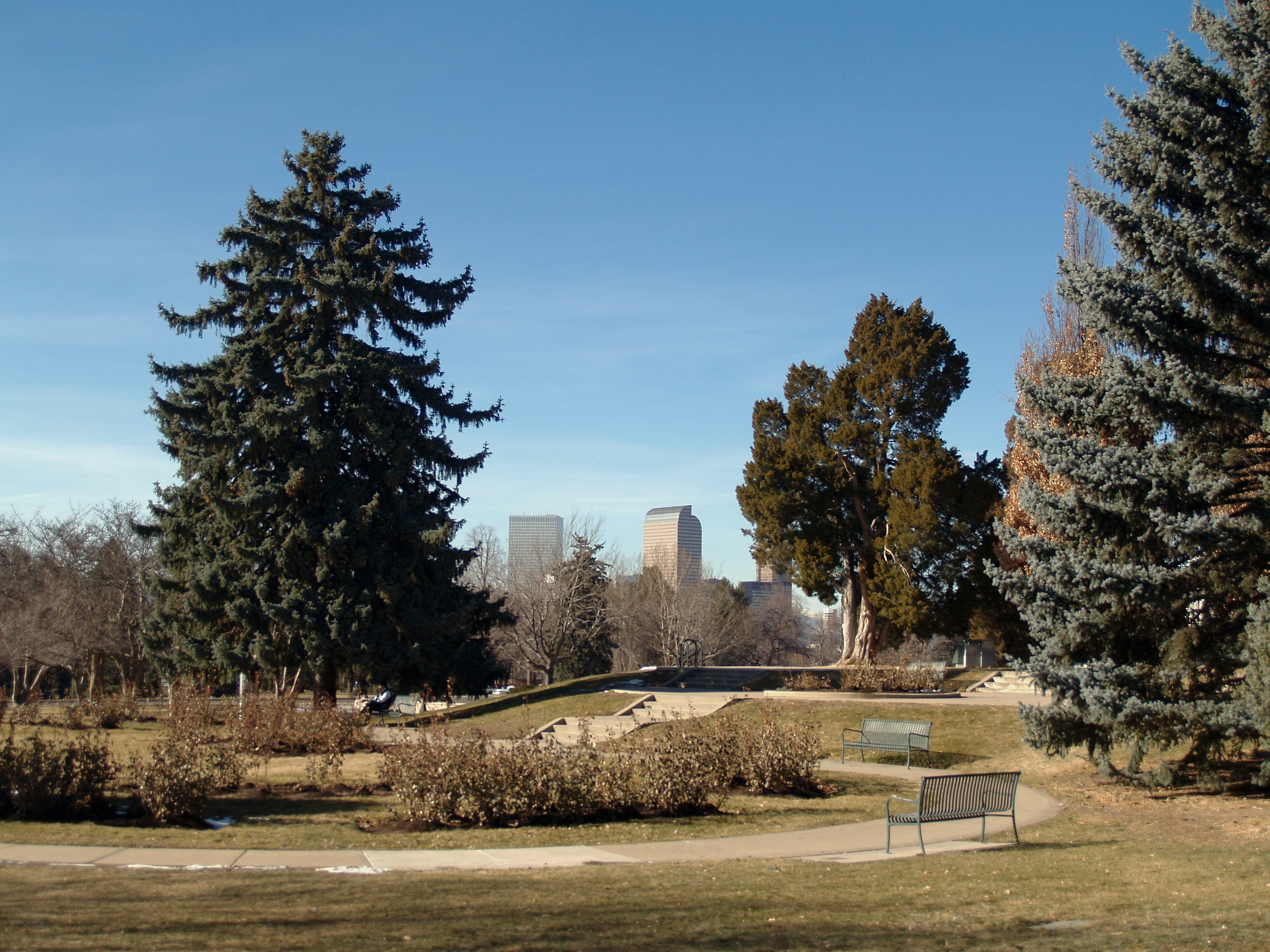
The north end of the park.

Several years went by while the city waited for citizens to remove the remains of their families, but few did. Most of the people buried in the cemetery were vagrants, criminals, and paupers, which probably had a lot to do with why the majority of bodies, more than 5,000, remained unclaimed. In 1893 The City of Denver then awarded a contract to undertaker E.P. McGovern to remove the remains. McGovern was to provide a "fresh" coffin for each body and then transfer it to the Riverside Cemetery at a cost of $1.90 each. The macabre work began on March 14, 1893, while an assorted audience of curiosity-seekers and reporters came and went. For the first few days, the transfer was orderly. However, the unscrupulous McGovern soon found a way to make an even larger profit on the contract. Rather than utilizing full-size coffins for adults, he used child-sized caskets that were just one foot by 3½ feet long. One source claims this was done at least partially because of a coffin shortage caused by a mining accident in Utah. Hacking the bodies up, McGovern sometimes used as many as three caskets for just one body. In their haste, body parts and bones were literally strewn everywhere in a disorganized mess. Their haste also allowed souvenir hunters and onlookers to help themselves to items from the caskets.

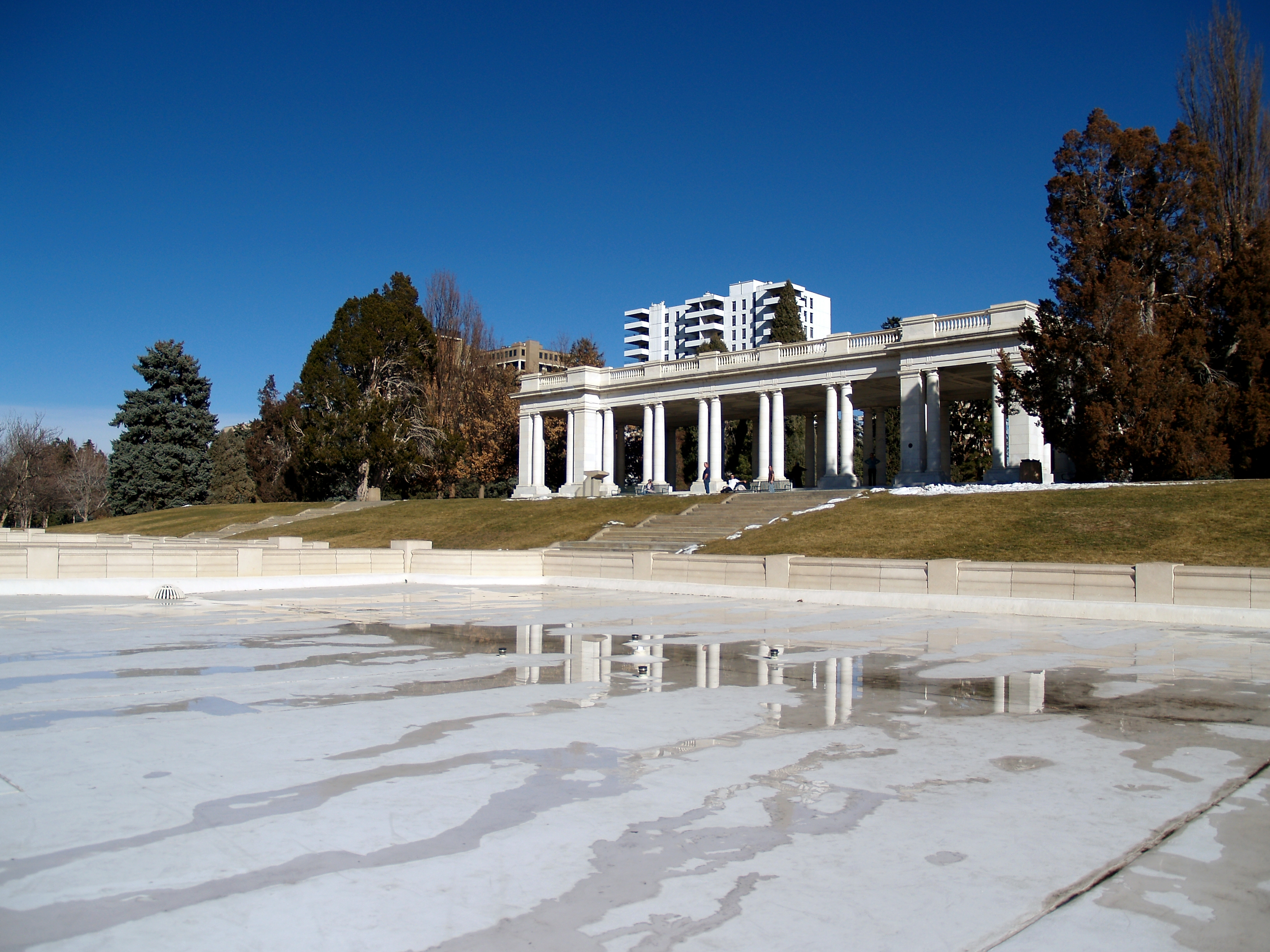
The Cheesman Pavilion, dedicated 1908

The Denver Republican newspaper ran a story breaking the news, its March 19, 1893 headline read: "The Work of Ghouls". The article described, in detail, McGovern's practice of hacking up what were sometimes intact remains of the dead and stuffing them into children's-size coffins. The article partly described the scene:

Into the first box some bones were cavalierly tossed by a workman. He then pulled another box to the edge of the grave, and into this he tossed one bone, some earth and portion of the coffin. [...] At this juncture a man came along with a pot of paint and brush and numbered and lettered the two boxes already filled from the single grave. John E. Wood, the representative of the Health department, also came up. When he saw the third box he asked the man in the grave what it was for. “Oh, I guess there's another one here,” said the grave-digger, as he threw a shovelful of earth into the box. Mr. Wood looked into the grave, said “Humph,” and walked away. Another shovelful of earth and some crumbled wood was then thrown into the box, the “remains” were disinfected, the lid fastened on and the “body” of “274, B. H.,” shipped to Riverside.

Mayor Rogers canceled the contract and the city Health Commissioner began an investigation. Although numerous graves had not yet been reached and others sat exposed, a new contract for moving the bodies was never awarded.

== Park construction and changes ==
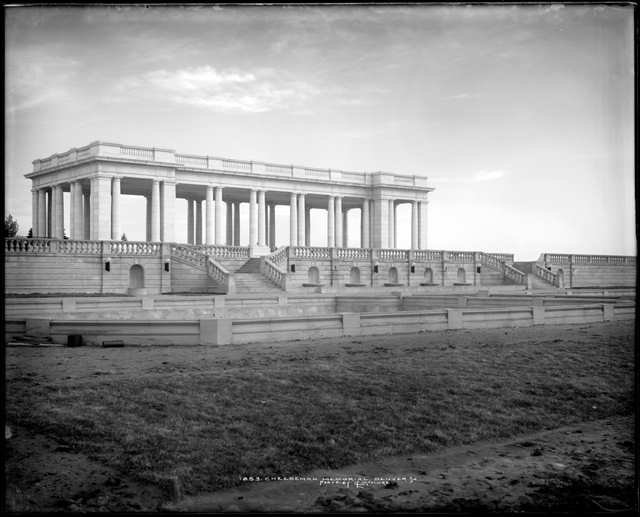
Newly constructed Cheesman Memorial, 1908

The city built a temporary wooden fence around the cemetery and in 1894, grading and leveling began in preparation for the park, though several of the open graves wouldn't be filled in until 1902. Finally shrubs were planted and the holes filled in where coffins were removed. Work was completed in 1907, without ever having moved the rest of the bodies.

Denver's landscape architect, German-born Reinhard Schuetze, did the initial designs for the park with its meandering carriage-ways that join in a figure-8, the pavilion and reflecting pool and the verdant central meadows outlined in groves of trees. Schuetze died in 1910 before the park was completed, but his successor S.R. DeBoer finished the park with much of Schuetze's plan intact. The central connection street of the figure-8 was later removed and grass planted in its place. High Street also originally ran through the park, passing just east of the marble pavilion, but was eventually removed, with grass and trees taking its place.

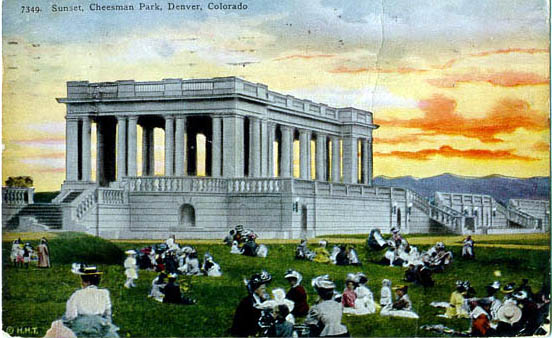
Colorized photograph of the Cheesman Pavilion ca. 1910

The Cheesman Memorial was constructed in 1908 from Colorado Yule marble, in the Neoclassical style, on a raised platform with retaining walls clad in ashlar masonry and topped by decorative balustrades. The walls were installed with fountains and inset with grand staircases approaching the pavilion, in the style of an Italian Renaissance garden. At the base of the supporting platform to the west are three large reflecting pools, used as wading pools in the summertime until the 1970s. Between 1934 and 1972 the Denver Post sponsored open air performances of Broadway musicals and operas staged at the pavilion. The famed Olmsted Brothers designed the landscaping surrounding the memorial; in 1912 an esplanade with formal parterres for flower plantings was installed between the memorial and Williams Street parkway to the east.

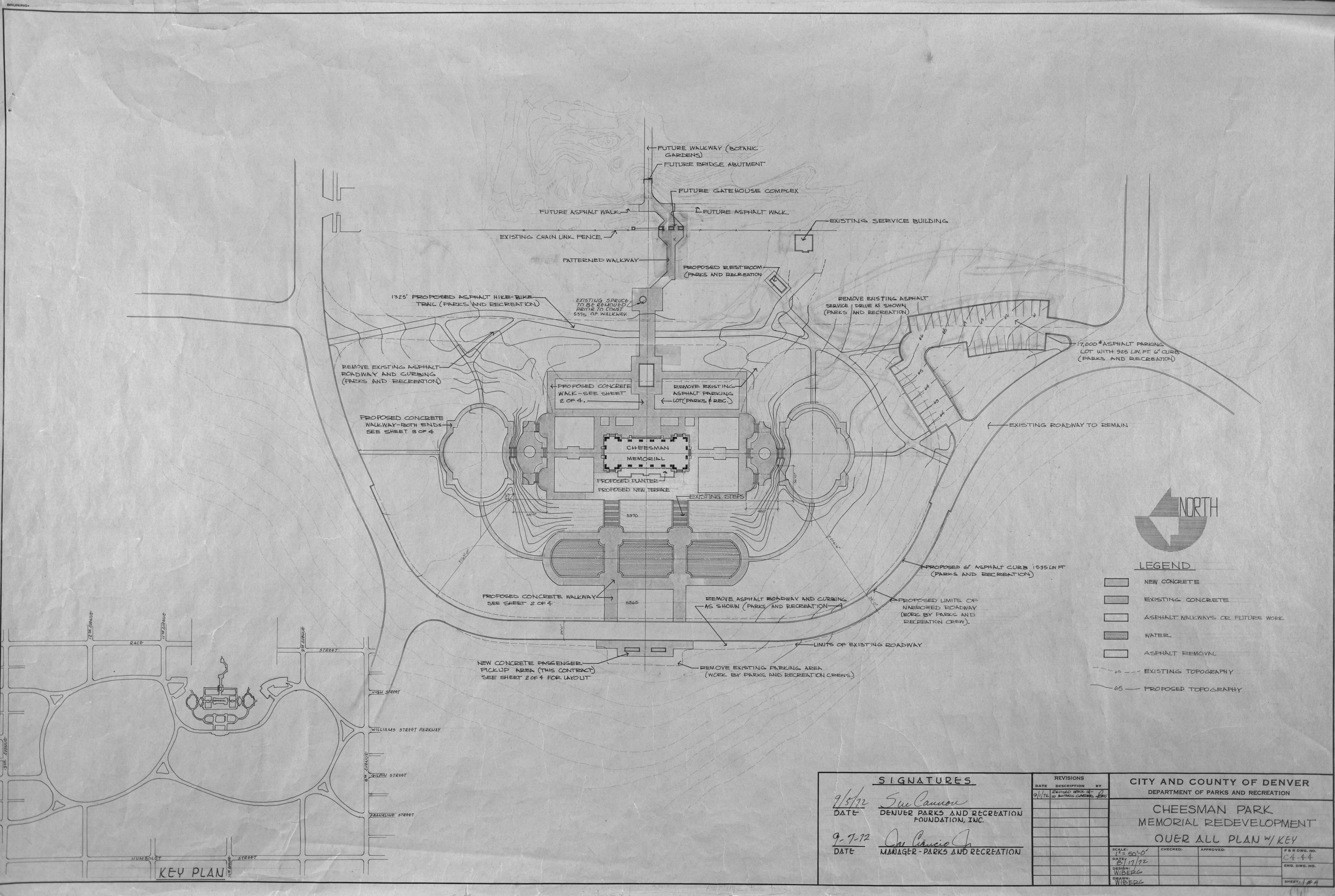
Cheesman Park 1972 redevelopment plan

By the 1970s the pavilion and supporting plinth were in a state of serious disrepair. City authorities undertook a restoration of the pavilion but decided to replace the platform altogether with gently sloping lawns and modest concrete staircases. Today only the pavilion and reflecting pools remain of the original complex. The new grading meant that much of the original formal landscaping was lost during this period, replaced with simplified flower beds and a rose garden to the north.

The area at the south edge of the park, near the intersection of 8th and Williams Streets, once used as the Chinese cemetery was used as the city tree and shrub nursery until 1930 when a WPA project converted it to an addition for the park. The Catholic Church moved most of the remains of those buried in the Mount Calvary Cemetery and sold the land back to the city in 1950. This city-block-sized park is now Cheesman Esplanade, often called "Little Cheesman Park" by the area's residents.

== Modern Park ==
In November 2008, during initial construction of a new parking structure for the Denver Botanic Gardens between York and Josephine Streets, human bones and parts of coffins were unearthed. The bodies were removed and buried in a different cemetery and construction was allowed to continue.

In 2008, an assessment by the City and County of Denver proposed restoring much of Cheesman Park along the lines of the original 1902 plan conceived by Reinhardt Scheutze. This would include replanting many trees lost over the years, removing obstructive vegetation, and restoring the parkway to the original figure-8 design. The retaining walls, fountains and staircases which once supported the Cheesman Memorial would also be restored along with the esplanade and gardens that once surrounded the pavilion.

Cheesman Park is considered a gathering spot among the gay community in Denver. Notable LGBT-related events that take place at the park include monthly transgender picnics, and the annual PrideFest parade which typically takes place during June and travels from Cheesman Park to Civic Center Park near downtown. Also, the AIDS Walk Colorado takes place in and around the park annually, usually during September.

== The Cheesman Park neighborhood ==
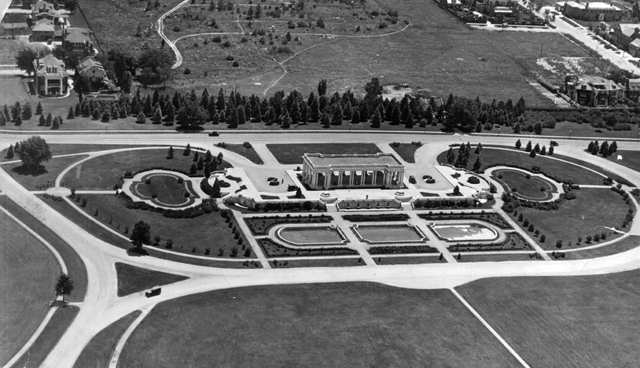
Aerial photograph of Cheesman Park ca. 1911 (the vacant area in the upper part of the photo is the site of the future Botanic Gardens)

The Cheesman Park neighborhood is one of the oldest in Denver, with city plats dating to as far back as 1868 and was annexed by the City of Denver in 1883, though development was slow at first. By 1915, with the completion of the park, the neighborhood was mostly developed with large mansions for some of the city's wealthiest people. Since the 1930s however, the neighborhood has become denser with a plethora of apartment buildings.

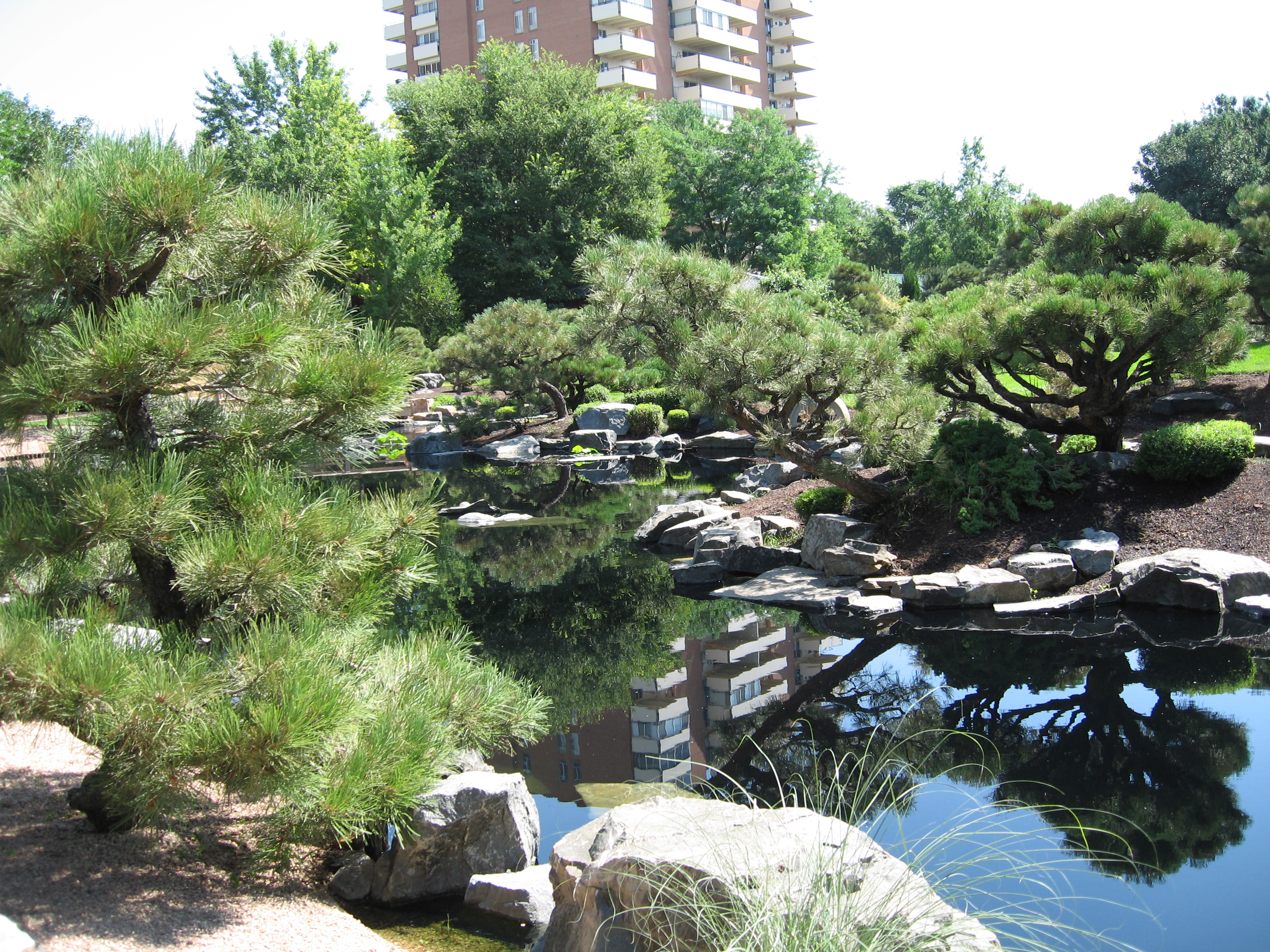
The Denver Botanic Garden's Japanese Garden located in Cheesman Park

The neighborhood of Cheesman Park is bordered north–south by Colfax and 8th Avenues, and east–west by Downing and Josephine Streets. The Cheesman Park neighborhood is often considered part of Denver's Capitol Hill neighborhood (to the west), as the northern residential area of Cheesman Park was part of the "Capitol Hill" subdivision of the city on February 14, 1882, and the southern residential area was part of the "South Division of Capitol Hill" subdivision of August 26, 1882. At the time, this "fashionable residential district" was occupied by the city's "business and professional class."

The neighborhood has a population density of more than 12,000 people per square mile, far exceeding Denver's average density of 3,600 people per square mile, due to the many high-rise and mid-rise apartments and condominiums surrounding the park. However, the neighborhood contains not only modern, dense residential units; it also contains three of Denver's residential historic districts: Wyman's, Morgan's Addition, and Humboldt Island. These historic districts now preserve homes of a wide variety of architectural styles, from the late 19th century through the early 20th century.

The neighborhood is predominantly white and middle class with a median household income of $42,477 in 2008, and a higher average level of educational attainment than the city as a whole. The neighborhood has more single/unmarried people than Denver's average (only 13.2% married, compared to 34.7% for the entire city), with only 2.6% having children, compared to 15.0% for the city, and it consequently has a smaller average household size.

There are more renters than homeowners in the neighborhood; the area's apartments are a mix of newer and older apartment buildings, and conversions of older mansions into apartments. Only about a quarter of the neighborhood's residents live in owner-occupied units, and the average detached single family home value was $791,976 in 2008, more than double the city's average of $341,104.

Cheesman Park has a fairly urban character with its density and closeness to the central part of the city. The neighborhood's crime rates are close to the city's average. It contains several areas of commercial activity particularly north of the park between 13th and Colfax avenues, and is also home to the 23-acre (93,000 m^{2}) Denver Botanical Gardens.

== Film inspiration ==
In a 1980 interview, writer and playwright Russell Hunter said he based many elements from The Changeling on experiences from his first months in Denver in 1968, while living in a large house at 1739 East 13th Avenue on the northern edge of Cheesman Park. The house was razed in the 1970s and a condominium building now stands on the site. Although the film is set in Seattle, the house the film centers on is called the "Chessman" House, a nod to the Denver inspiration.

== See also ==
- Bibliography of Colorado
- Geography of Colorado
- History of Colorado
- Index of Colorado-related articles
- List of Colorado-related lists
  - List of neighborhoods in Denver
  - List of populated places in Colorado
- Outline of Colorado
