= Margaret Clarke =

Margaret Clarke may refer to:

- Margaret Clarke (artist) (1881–1961), Irish portrait painter
- Margaret Clarke (chess) (1937–2018), British chess player
- Margaret Clarke (politician) (born 1940), Northern Ireland politician
- Margaret Turner Clarke (1836–1887), Australian nurse
- Margaret Clarke (actress), in Espedair Street
- Margaret Clarke (camogie), see All-Ireland Senior Camogie Championship 1959

== See also ==
- Margaret Clark (disambiguation)
- Maggie Clarke, environmental scientist
- Peggy Clarke (disambiguation)
