= Jonathan Axelrod =

American producer and screenwriter (1949–2024)

- Born: July 9, 1949; New York City, New York, U.S.
- Died: June 13, 2024 (aged 74); Los Angeles, California, U.S.
- Occupations: Producer, screenwriter
- Spouse: Illeana Douglas (m. 1998; div. 2001)
- Relatives: George Axelrod (father); Nina Axelrod (sister); Steven G. Axelrod (stepbrother); Taliesin Jaffe (nephew)

Jonathan Axelrod (July 9, 1949 – June 13, 2024) was an American television producer and screenwriter. Axelrod wrote for film Every Little Crook and Nanny (1972). He was executive producer on the television series Dave's World. Axelrod produced movies for the Hallmark Channel.

Born in New York City on July 9, 1949, Axelrod died in Los Angeles on June 13, 2024, at the age of 74.
