= Journey to the Center of the Earth (2008 TV film) =

2008 American broadcast television film

- DVD cover
- Genre: Action adventure; Science fiction; Fantasy
- Based on: Journey to the Center of the Earth by Jules Verne
- Written by: William Gray; Tom Baum
- Directed by: T. J. Scott
- Music by: Ella; René Dupéré; Martin Lord Ferguson
- Countries of origin: Canada; United States
- Original language: English

Production
- Executive producers: Robert Halmi Sr.; Robert Halmi Jr.
- Producer: George Horie
- Cinematography: Philip Linzey
- Editor: Allan Lee
- Running time: 90 minutes
- Production company: RHI Entertainment

Original release
- Network: Ion Television
- Release: January 27, 2008

Journey to the Center of the Earth is a 2008 American-Canadian television action adventure film directed by T. J. Scott and starring Rick Schroder, Victoria Pratt, and Peter Fonda. The film is very loosely based on the 1864 novel of the same name by Jules Verne.

It was shot in HD on location in and around Vancouver in the summer of 2007, and first aired on Ion Television on January 27, 2008. It was released on DVD in 2008, prior to the release of the theatrical film.

== Plot ==
Scientist, and part-time prizefighter, Jonathan Brock is visited at his home by heiress Martha Dennison. Years earlier Jonathon had met Martha's husband, Edward, who had given him a fossil which came from a mine in a volcano in the then Russian territory of Alaska. Supposedly the mine leads to the center of the Earth, which Jonathon dismisses as a myth. Martha tells him Edward disappeared four years earlier on an expedition towards the center of the Earth, and she wants Jonathon to find him. Jonathan hesitates despite Martha's offer to pay him handsomely, which would pay off the debts owed on his recently deceased father's estate. Martha gives him Edward's notes saying once he has read them he will know why she must have his answer in 24 hours. When Jonathon agrees to search for Edward, his nephew, Abel, asks to join him as it would boost his career as a journalist, though his fiancée Emily, thinks it is a poor excuse to postpone their wedding. Jonathon agrees to take Abel with him, and says that Abel should dedicate his journal to Emily. Two weeks later, Jonathon, Martha, and Abel arrive in Sitka in the new Territory of Alaska. After Abel's wallet is stolen, Jonathon encounters Sergei, whose friend Mikael went on the expedition with Edward. Sergei agrees to go with them, hoping to find Mikael. Martha says they must reach the mine in 10 days as it is only visible on the equinox, September 23.

With only a crudely drawn map to guide them, they arrive at a lake indicated on the map. Jonathon calculates the mine's position despite the clouds and steam rising from the lake. They enter the mine, venturing deep into the earth. They find occasional signs of the previous expedition and the skeleton of Mikael. They come out onto the edge of a large lake surrounded by lush forest. Jonathon says that the light is probably electrical like the aurora borealis but constant so that it never gets dark. Jonathan and Sergei find some logs that were clearly cut down by a person using an axe, presumably to make a raft to cross the lake. They use the left over logs and their supply of rope to make a raft of their own. As they cross the lake they are attacked by prehistoric birds (Archaeopteryx) and menaced by a plesiosaur. They shoot some of the birds, which the plesiosaur eats, distracting it long enough to get away. Jonathon says the creatures they have encountered seem to have come from different eras of development and may have escaped to this region and survived the Ice Ages which killed dinosaurs remaining on the surface.

They find a damaged raft, believed to be Edward's, and make camp. While Abel goes exploring alone, Sergei reveals to Jonathan that he did not go along with Edward when he first came to Alaska because he did not trust him and blames himself for not stopping Mikael from joining the expedition that led to his death. Abel sees two women in the forest and tells Jonathon. The four of them follow a trail that leads them to a well-constructed rope bridge. As they cross they are captured by hostile natives who take them to their village. Edward arrives, appearing to be the tribe's leader, and instructs them to bow and give up their weapons as a native custom.

Edward explains that the natives came from the surface thousands of years earlier. The natives believe Edward to be some kind of a god who has brought them prosperity and safety by sharing his wisdom, much of which is based on his study of other civilizations. In private, Edward says he never expected Martha to come for him and he intends to stay. Martha says she expected him to be pleased to see her. Edward says he has power and influence that he did not have in the world above. Edward tries to reconcile with Martha but she rebuffs him and he goes to the village priestess. While they are talking, a group of natives join forces and free some prisoners. Jonathon sees them, then Edward fires a pistol and most of them run away. He gives Jonathon the other pistol and tells him to guard the men who have stayed and to shoot them if they run away. He then starts chasing and firing at the others. Jonathon gestures to the men to leave but Edward sees this and shoots one of them. He says the young man is a traitor and gets ready to shoot him. Jonathon and Martha try to talk him out of it, but he insists the man is a traitor and kills him. Martha punches him causing him to bleed, which disturbs the villagers. Jonathon says "Gods don't bleed". Edward explains that Wakinta, who escaped with help from Jonathan, doubted Edward from the start and started a resistance to his rule. The arrival of Martha and the others has undercut Edward's power and now the resistance must be annihilated. Martha explains to Jonathon that Edward's arrogance and sense of entitlement is what attracted her to him in the first place.

The villagers, realising Edward is a false god, leave the village, ignoring Edward's protestations. Edward says they must leave and that their raft has been destroyed so they must take an ancient passage the natives took to get down from the surface. Wakinta and some of the villagers chase after them. When they are nearly caught, Edward holds out a last stick of dynamite to ward them off. They reach the cave to the surface, and Edward lights the dynamite intending to seal the entrance so the villagers cannot follow them. When it fails to ignite, Edward leaves the cave and shoots the dynamite sealing the rest of the group in and him outside. They find a swiftly flowing underground river and eventually are sucked along in the current, which eventually expels them onto the lake on the surface, near where they originally found the entrance to the cave.

On the surface they make a small memorial for Edward, who is presumed dead, and decide not to tell the secret of the world below, and to continue their adventures to the East Indies. Martha and Jonathan kiss. Abel then writes at the end of his journal that everything he has written and drawn about is only a figment of his imagination.

== Cast ==
- Rick Schroder as Jonathan Brock
- Victoria Pratt as Martha Dennison
- Peter Fonda as Edward Dennison
- Steven Grayhm as Abel Brock
- Mike Dopud as Sergei
- Elyse Levesque as Emily

== Reception ==
Critic Bob Bloom wrote in 2008 that "The digital transfer is fine, the story adequate."
