= William Gray (screenwriter) =

Canadian screenwriter

William Gray is a Canadian screenwriter. He won the Genie Award for Best Adapted Screenplay for the 1980 supernatural horror film The Changeling, which he co-wrote with Diana Maddox.

== Biography ==
Born in Toronto, Gray worked as a rock music critic for the Toronto Sun before beginning a career in insurance. He was later hired by Paul Lynch to write the screenplay for the sports drama Blood and Guts (1978).

Gray co-wrote the screenplay for the supernatural horror film The Changeling (1980) with Diana Maddox. Gray and Maddox won the Genie Award for Best Adapted Screenplay for The Changeling.

Gray worked as a screenwriter for several other projects for director Paul Lynch, including the slasher film Prom Night (1980), and the horror films Humongous (1982) and Cross Country (1983). In 1984, he wrote the screenplay for the science fiction film The Philadelphia Experiment with Michael Hanover, followed by Black Moon Rising (1986), which he co-wrote with John Carpenter and Desmond Nakano.

== Filmography ==
Year	Title	Notes	Ref.
1978	Blood and Guts		
1980	The Changeling	Co-written with Diana Maddox	
1980	Prom Night		
1981	An Eye for an Eye		
1982	Humongous		
1983	Cross Country	Co-written with John Hunter	
1984	The Philadelphia Experiment	Co-written with Michael Janover	
1986	Black Moon Rising	Co-written with John Carpenter and Desmond Nakano	
1987	The Abduction of Kari Swenson	Television film	
1999	Killer Deal	Television film	
2008	Journey to the Center of the Earth	Television film; co-written with Tom Baum	

== Accolades ==
Award/association	Year	Category	Nominated work	Result	Ref.
Gemini Awards	1995	Best Writing in a Dramatic Series	Robocop	Nominated	
Genie Awards	1980	Best Adapted Screenplay	The Changeling	Won	
