= The Changeling (film) =

1980 Canadian supernatural psychological horror film

- Theatrical release poster
- Directed by: Peter Medak
- Screenplay by: William Gray; Diana Maddox
- Story by: Russell Hunter
- Produced by: Joel B. Michaels; Garth H. Drabinsky; Mario Kassar
- Starring: George C. Scott; Trish Van Devere; Melvyn Douglas; John Colicos; Jean Marsh
- Cinematography: John Coquillon
- Edited by: Lilla Pedersen
- Music by: Rick Wilkins
- Production company: Chessman Park Productions
- Distributed by: Pan-Canadian Film Distributors
- Release dates: March 26, 1980 (USA Film Festival); March 28, 1980 (Canada and United States)
- Running time: 107 minutes
- Country: Canada
- Language: English
- Budget: $6.6 million
- Box office: $12 million (Note: Box office records cited by Richard Nowell in Blood Money: A History of the First Teen Slasher Film Cycle (2010) note that The Changeling earned $12 million. In American Film Distribution: The Changing Marketplace (1987), Suzanne Donahue notes a gross of $5.6 million in the United States.)

The Changeling is a 1980 Canadian supernatural psychological horror film directed by Peter Medak, written by William Gray and Diana Maddox, and starring George C. Scott, Trish Van Devere, and Melvyn Douglas. Its plot follows an esteemed New York City composer who relocates to a Seattle mansion he comes to believe is haunted.

The screenplay for The Changeling is based upon events that playwright Russell Hunter claimed to have experienced while he was living in the Henry Treat Rogers mansion in the Cheesman Park neighborhood of Denver, Colorado, in the late 1960s; Hunter served as a co-writer of the film. Principal photography began in December 1978, largely in Vancouver, British Columbia, with additional location shooting in Seattle.

The Changeling premiered at the USA Film Festival in Dallas, Texas, on March 26, 1980, and was released simultaneously in Canada and the United States two days later. It received largely favorable critical reviews, and was an early Canadian-produced film to have major success internationally. The film won eight inaugural Genie Awards, including Best Motion Picture, and was nominated for two Saturn Awards. It is considered a cult film and one of the most influential Canadian films of all time.

== Plot ==
John Russell, a composer from New York City, is vacationing with his wife and daughter upstate when his car gets stuck in snow. While he approaches a roadside phone booth to call for assistance, he witnesses his wife and daughter get struck and killed by an oncoming truck knocked off its path. The accident prompts him to move to Seattle, where he rents a mansion from the agent of a local historical society, Claire Norman, who tells him that the property has been vacant for twelve years.

Not long after moving in, John begins to experience unexplained phenomena, starting with a loud banging every morning. One night, he discovers all of the water taps turned on and sees the apparition of a drowned boy in a bathtub. Soon after, a red stained-glass windowpane shatters as he is outside and, upon investigation, he finds a locked, boarded up door in a closet leading to a hidden attic bedroom. John takes a music box from the mantel and discovers it plays the exact piano tune he has just recorded downstairs. John and Claire investigate the history of the house, believing that the ghost is that of a young girl killed on its grounds in a traffic accident in 1909. John holds a seance and overhears the voice of the spirit on audio equipment, calling himself Joseph Carmichael.

John discovers that Joseph Carmichael was a crippled and sickly six-year-old who was murdered in 1906 by his father Richard because he was unlikely to reach the age of 21, upon which he would have inherited an enormous fortune from his late maternal grandfather. To ensure the inheritance, Richard replaced the dead boy with one procured from a local orphanage and spirited him away to Europe under the pretense of seeking treatment for his condition. After years away, he returned with the boy when he was aged 18, claiming that he was cured. The grown "Joseph Carmichael" is now a prominent U.S. Senator, who is also a major patron of the historical society that owns the house where his adoptive father committed the murder.

John's investigation leads him to a property built on land that was once owned by the Carmichael family, where he believes the body of the murdered boy, the real Joseph Carmichael, was dumped in a well. Upon digging underneath the floorboard, he discovers the skeleton of a young child with his christening medal. John attempts to speak to Senator Carmichael but is restrained. The Senator is disturbed to see the medal, as it is identical to the one in his possession given to him by his adoptive father. The society cancels John's lease on the house and fires Claire. Senator Carmichael sends Police Captain DeWitt to John's home in an attempt to intimidate him and retrieve the medal. John refuses, and when DeWitt leaves to obtain a search warrant, his vehicle mysteriously overturns en route, killing him.

After DeWitt's death, Senator Carmichael agrees to meet with John; John tells him the story. Carmichael angrily berates John for accusing his adoptive father of murder. John leaves the skeleton's christening medal, along with the only copy of the seance recording. Claire goes to the house to find John and is chased by Joseph's wheelchair until she falls down the stairs. When John arrives the house begins to shake. He tries to appease Joseph's ghost but falls from the second floor as the ghost sets the house on fire. Simultaneously, Senator Carmichael compares the two medals, and, realizing the truth, falls into a trance staring at the portrait of his adoptive father. John witnesses the Senator's astral body climbing the burning stairs to Joseph's room. Claire rescues John while Carmichael has a vision of the murder and suffers a fatal heart attack. John and Claire see the Senator's body being loaded into the ambulance.

The next morning, Joseph's burnt wheelchair sits amid the ruins of the mansion and his music box begins playing a lullaby.

== Cast ==
- George C. Scott as John Russell
- Trish Van Devere as Claire Norman
- Melvyn Douglas as Sen. Joseph Carmichael
- John Colicos as DeWitt
- Jean Marsh as Joanna Russell
- Barry Morse as Doctor Pemberton
- Madeleine Sherwood as Mrs. Norman
- Helen Burns as Leah Harmon
- Ruth Springford as Minnie Huxley
- Frances Hyland as Mrs. Grey
- Eric Christmas as Albert Harmon
- Roberta Maxwell as Eva Lingstrom
- Bernard Behrens as Robert Lingstrom
- James B. Douglas as Eugene Carmichael
- Chris Gampel as Mr. Tuttle
- J. Kenneth Campbell as Colin
- Janne Mortil as Linda Grey
- Terence Kelly as Sgt. Durban
- Michelle Martin as Kathy Russell
- Antonia Rey as Estancia
- Louis Zorich as Stewart Adler
- Voldi Way as Joseph's Ghost

== Production ==
=== Screenplay and basis ===
The film's screenplay was inspired by events that allegedly took place at the Henry Treat Rogers mansion in Cheesman Park, Denver, Colorado, while playwright and composer Russell Hunter was living there during the 1960s. After experiencing a series of unexplained phenomena in the house, Hunter said he found a century-old journal in a hidden room detailing the life of a disabled boy who was kept in isolation by his parents, who sought to usurp a $70 million fortune he was set to inherit from affluent relatives. During a seance, he claimed, the spirit of a deceased boy directed him to another house, where human remains and a gold medallion bearing the dead boy's name were discovered. Henry Treat Rogers, a wealthy Denver attorney, was childless; but prior inhabitants of the house remain undocumented. The mansion was demolished during the 1980s and replaced with a high-rise apartment building.

The validity of Hunter's claims have been questioned; the Denver Public Library has no official record of Hunter residing at the Henry Treat Rogers mansion, and according to historian Phil Goodstein, no families in the Denver area had a fortune of $70 million between the late 1800s and early 1900s.

=== Financing ===
The film's budget was raised by selling $25,000 shares to 264 investors, who later made a profit of $9,229 on their shares. The film was among nine films shot in British Columbia during the late 1970s, when the province offered tax shelters on film productions.

=== Casting ===
Actor George C. Scott was cast in the film's lead role of John Russell, while his wife, actress Trish Van Devere, was cast in the role of Claire Norman.

=== Filming ===
Peter Medak was the third director hired for the project. His predecessors, Donald Cammell and Tony Richardson, both withdrew due to "creative differences". Medak was hired only a month before the scheduled release date to facilitate script re-writes and set construction.

Principal photography of The Changeling began on December 4, 1978. While the film is set in Seattle, most of its scenes were filmed in the British Columbian cities of Vancouver and Victoria, and their environs. Exceptions include introductory location shooting in New York City and establishing shots of Seattle points of interest, including SeaTac Airport, University of Washington's Red Square, the Space Needle, the Rainier Tower, and the Lacey V. Murrow Memorial Bridge. Interior college scenes were shot at the University of Washington in Seattle.

The Historical Society featured in the film is in fact Vancouver's historic Hotel Europe, while senator's home is the historical Hatley Castle on the grounds of Royal Roads Military College (now Royal Roads University) in Victoria. Additional photography occurred at the Orpheum Theatre in Vancouver.

In searching for a property to stand in for the central location of the film's haunted mansion, art director Reuben Freed stated the design team "looked for an exterior we could possibly use without too much alteration and we didn’t find anything that had the gothic quality we wanted." Instead, an exterior facade was constructed on the lot of an existing home in the Oakridge neighborhood of Vancouver. The mansion's interiors were filmed on a series of interconnected sets at Panorama Film Studios in West Vancouver. Principal photography was completed on February 25, 1979.

The film marked the first on-screen appearance of Joshua Jackson, who was seven months old at the time; his mother, Fiona Jackson, worked on the film as an assistant director. Music conductor Kazuyoshi Akiyama also appears in the film conducting a live music performance.

== Release ==
The Changeling premiered at the USA Film Festival in Dallas, Texas on March 26, 1980. It was released in the United States and Canada two days later, on March 28, 1980.

=== Home media ===
The film was released on LaserDisc with an analog stereo soundtrack by Vestron Video in 1983. The film was also released on DVD by HBO Home Video in 2000.

The independent distributor Severin Films released a limited edition Blu-ray in the United States on August 7, 2018. Severin Films issued a 4K UHD Blu-ray edition on October 26, 2022.

== Reception ==
=== Box office ===
The Changeling was a box office success, grossing $12 million worldwide against its $6.6 million budget. The film was the highest-grossing Canadian production released in 1980, earning it the Golden Reel Award at the 2nd Genie Awards.

=== Critical response ===
Edwin Miller of Seventeen wrote that the film was a "visually classy chiller ... aided by stunning film locations." Richard Grenier of Cosmopolitan praised Medak's direction, but added: "it is Scott, using the full range of his immense talent, who gives the story its spine-tingling impact," and deemed it the best horror film of the year. Variety also praised the film, noting it as a "superior haunted house thriller." Ed Blank of the Pittsburgh Press referred to the film as "an unexceptional but diverting horror story with better-than-average performers." A review published in Florida Today praised the film as "the best ghost story of the year," noting Medak's direction as "brilliant," and likening it to The Innocents. In The Morning News, the film was noted as a "good ghost story ... George C. Scott's demonic energy works well for him here, giving a force and power that might elude a weaker actor. Trish Vandevere is appealing in the role of the historic society woman and Melvyn Douglas is superb as a crusty old millionaire."

Conversely, Roger Ebert of the Chicago Sun-Times was more mixed: "If it only took craftsmanship to make a haunted house movie, The Changeling would be a great one. It has all the technical requirements, beginning with the haunted house itself ... [the film] does have some interesting ideas ... But it doesn't have that sneaky sense of awful things about to happen. Scott makes the hero so rational, normal and self-possessed that we never feel he's in real danger; we go through this movie with too much confidence." Fiona Ferguson of Time Out was critical of the plot, noting: "the leaps made by Scott's agile mind in identifying both victim and usurper leave logic and credence on the starting block." The Arizona Republic's Michael Maza wrote a less favorable review, calling the film "a sure-thing haunted house story" and "routine picture" supplemented with "formulaic eerie noises, cobwebbed stairways, crashing glassware and unbelievable coincidences."

Retrospective reviews have also been positive. Film 4 noted the film as "a minor classic" and "underrated member of the haunted house movie genre." On the review aggregator website Rotten Tomatoes, The Changeling holds an 85% approval rating based on 26 reviews, with an average rating of 7.5/10. The consensus reads: "George C. Scott's somber performance gives this haunted house horror a moving soul to go along with its harrowing scares." On Metacritic, the film has a weighted average score of 70 out of 100 based on 9 critics, indicating "generally positive reviews".

=== Accolades ===
Award/association	Year	Category	Recipient(s) and nominee(s)	Result	Ref.
Boston Society of Film Critics	2018	Best Rediscovery	Peter Medak	Won	
Fantafestival	1982	Best Actor	George C. Scott	Won	
Genie Awards	1980	Best Motion Picture	The Changeling	Won	
Genie Awards	1980	Best Foreign Actor	George C. Scott	Won	
Genie Awards	1980	Best Foreign Actress	Trish Van Devere	Won	
Genie Awards	1980	Best Supporting Actress	Helen Burns	Nominated	
Genie Awards	1980	Best Supporting Actress	Frances Hyland	Nominated	
Genie Awards	1980	Best Adapted Screenplay	William Gray; Diana Maddox	Won	
Genie Awards	1980	Best Art Design	Trevor Williams	Won	
Genie Awards	1980	Best Cinematography	John Coquillon	Won	
Genie Awards	1980	Best Sound	Joe Grimaldi; Austin Grimaldi; Dino Pigat; Karl Scherer	Won	
Genie Awards	1980	Best Sound Editing	Patrick Drummond; Dennis Drummond; Robert Grieve	Won	
Genie Awards	1981	Golden Reel Award	The Changeling	Won	
Saturn Awards	1981	Best International Film	The Changeling	Nominated	
Saturn Awards	1981	Best Supporting Actor	Melvyn Douglas	Nominated	
Saturn Awards	2019	Best DVD or Blu-ray Special Edition Release	The Changeling	Nominated	

== Soundtrack ==
The soundtrack to The Changeling was released by Percepto Records on CD on December 21, 2001 and was limited to 1,000 copies. On April 13, 2007, Percepto released a 2-CD "Deluxe Edition" of the soundtrack, which was also limited to 1,000 copies and has subsequently been sold out.

Standard edition
No.	Title	Length
1.	"Main Title"	2:31
2.	"The First Look"	1:46
3.	"First Chill"	1:31
4.	"Music Box Theme for Piano"
5.	"Country Ride"	1:04
6.	"Bathtub Reflections"	3:03
7.	"Secret Door"	3:31
8.	"The Attic"	2:45
9.	"Music Box Theme"	1:45
10.	"The Ball"	3:15
11.	"The Seance"	7:31
12.	"The Killing"	3:42
13.	"Carmichael Reflects / On the Floor"	2:18
14.	"Face on the Bedroom Floor"	1:59
15.	"Chain Reaction"	3:46
16.	"The Doors"	1:10
17.	"Mirror, Mirror on the Wall"	1:11
18.	"The Attic Calls Clair"	3:52
19.	"Resolution"	5:53
20.	"End Title"	3:10
21.	"The Seance (Alternate Version)" (bonus track)	7:09
22.	"Carmichael's Demise" (bonus track)	3:43
23.	"Piano Solos" (bonus track)	1:37
24.	"Alternate End Titles" (bonus track)	2:31

Deluxe edition

Disc 1
No.	Title	Length
1.	"Main Titles"	2:33
2.	"Piano Source"	0:57
3.	"Arrival at the House"	1:48
4.	"Piano Source"	1:11
5.	"Piano Source"	0:13
6.	"First Chill"	1:33
7.	"The Door Opens by Itself"	0:21
8.	"Music Box Theme for Piano"	2:06
9.	"Country Ride"	1:06
10.	"Bathtub Reflections"	3:05
11.	"Finding the Secret Door"	3:33
12.	"Up Into the Attic"	2:47
13.	"Music Box Theme"	1:47
14.	"The Wheelchair"	0:25
15.	"Microfilm Research / Cemetery"	1:30
16.	"Ball Over the Bridge / It's Back!"	3:17
17.	"The Seance / Talk to Us!"	7:14
18.	"Murder Flashback"	3:43
19.	"Wheelchair / Carmichael Tower"	1:00
20.	"Carmichael Reflects"	0:34
21.	"The House on the Lake"	1:56
22.	"Breaking into the House"	0:54
23.	"Face on the Bedroom Floor"	2:01
24.	"The Chain Appears in the Dirt"	3:47
25.	"All the Doors Shut"	1:12
26.	"Mirror, Mirror (Vision of Death)"	1:13
27.	"Russell Goes to See Carmichael"	2:02
28.	"The Attic Calls Clair"	3:53
29.	"The Big Finale / Resolution"	5:55
30.	"Music Box / End Credits"	3:13

Disc 2
No.	Title	Length
1.	"The Seance (Alternate Version)"	7:11
2.	"Carmichael's Demise (Unused Cue)"	3:45
3.	"Alternate End Title"	2:31
4.	"Unknown Cure"	1:51
5.	"Unused String Quartet (V1)"	0:48
6.	"Unused String Quartet (V2)"	1:17
7.	"Solo Celeste"	0:47

=== Additional music ===
Music from the film also included:

- Mozart, Rondo in A minor for Piano, K. 511
- Brahms, Symphony #1 in C minor, Opus 68
- Brahms, Scherzo from Quintet in F minor, Opus 34

== Legacy ==
The Changeling ranked no. 54 on Bravo's 100 Scariest Movie Moments series. Director Martin Scorsese placed The Changeling on his list of the 11 scariest horror films of all time. In a list compiled for Esquire in 2024, it was ranked the 29th-greatest horror film of the 1980s. In 2024, Entertainment Weekly ranked The Changeling as the best haunted house film of all time.

== Related works ==
In 1987, Italian director Lamberto Bava directed Until Death, an unofficial made-for-television film that was marketed as a sequel for its home video releases; however, there is no connection between the films.

In 2018, a remake was set up at international sales company Cornerstone Films and German production company X Filme, with Joel B. Michaels returning to produce. Mark Steven Johnson was attached as writer and director, and the setting would be relocated to Venice, Italy. Two years later, Anders Engström replaced Johnson and the setting was changed to Ireland. Tab Murphy was brought on as screenwriter, who claimed that the film would be more of a "reimagining" than a remake. He promised a three-page outline to Michaels, who he had previously worked with on Last of the Dogmen, and came back with 33 pages instead. Cornerstone also shopped the film to the Marché du Film that year.

== See also ==
- List of ghost films

== Sources ==
- Curti, Roberto (2019). Italian Gothic Horror Films, 1980-1989. Jefferson, North Carolina: McFarland & Company. ISBN 978-1-476-67243-4.
- Donahue, Suzanne Mary (1987). American Film Distribution: The Changing Marketplace. Ann Arbor, Michigan: UMI Research Press. ISBN 978-0-835-71776-2.
- Goodstein, P. H. (1986). The Ghosts of Denver: Capitol Hill. Denver, Colorado: Life Publications. ISBN 978-0-962-21694-7.
- Meehan, Paul (2019). The Haunted House on Film: An Historical Analysis. Jefferson, North Carolina: McFarland & Company. ISBN 978-1-476-63820-1.
- Muir, John Kenneth (2012). Horror Films of the 1980s. Vol. 1. Jefferson, North Carolina: McFarland & Company. ISBN 978-0-786-47298-7. OCLC 840902442.
- Nowell, Richard (2010). Blood Money: A History of the First Teen Slasher Film Cycle. New York City, New York: Bloomsbury. ISBN 978-1-441-12496-8. OCLC 939942165.
