= Humongous (film) =

Canadian slasher film

- U.S. theatrical release poster
- Directed by: Paul Lynch
- Written by: William Gray
- Produced by: Anthony Kramreither
- Starring: Janet Julian; David Wallace; John Wildman; Page Fletcher
- Cinematography: Brian R.R. Hebb
- Edited by: Nick Rotundo
- Music by: John Mills-Cockell
- Production company: Humongous Films
- Distributed by: Astral Films; Embassy Pictures (United States)
- Release date: June 11, 1982
- Running time: 94 minutes
- Country: Canada
- Language: English
- Budget: CAD$2,000,000 (estimated)

Humongous is a 1982 Canadian slasher film directed by Paul Lynch, and starring Janet Julian, John Wildman, and David Wallace. The screenplay was written by William Gray, who had also written Lynch's earlier slasher film Prom Night (1980). The story centers on a group of young adults who become stranded on a deserted island, where they are stalked and murdered by a monstrous assailant. Brian R.R. Hebb served as cinematographer, shooting in a darkly lit style, while John Mills-Cockell composed a minimalist synthesizer score. The film had a theatrical release in 1982, distributed by Embassy Pictures in the United States, but its reputation suffered from a notoriously dark and muddy VHS transfer that made key scenes difficult to see.

== Plot ==
During Labor Day weekend in 1946, young Ida Parsons is chased into the woods and raped by a houseguest. Her dogs break out of their pen and attack and kill Ida's rapist.

In 1982, brothers Eric and Nick borrow their father's yacht to take their girlfriends, Sandy and Donna, and their sister, Carla, on a weekend outing to St. Martin Island. That night, Eric and Nick discover and rescue a shipwrecked fisherman named Bert. Bert was wrecked offshore Dog Island, the home of lumber baroness Ida Parsons, who has used her family fortune to hole herself up on the island for the past thirty-five years, only making two annual voyages to the mainland for supplies, and never speaking to anyone. Recovering from the onset of hypothermia, Bert tells a campfire story of the wild dogs that roam Ida's island.

Donna, Eric, Sandy, Nick, and Bert wreck their boat and wash up on Dog Island. Bert is wounded, and Carla is nowhere to be found. Nick wanders off into the woods and is killed by a hulking figure. The next morning, Sandy and Eric go onto the island, hoping Ida Parsons will help them get back to the mainland. After they leave the beach, Bert goes into shock, and Donna tries to warm him. The killer sneaks up behind Donna and Bert, hurling Donna against a rock wall and decapitates Bert.

At the center of the island, Sandy and Eric discover Ida's fortified cabin. All of Ida's dogs are dead, their mutilated skeletons lying in their pens. In Ida's boathouse, Sandy and Eric discover Carla hiding under a tarp; she washed up at another point and made it to the compound during the night. Exploring Ida's compound, Eric, Sandy and Carla discover a dust-covered nursery full of antique toys, a crib, and Ida's diary, which contains insane, rambling passages about giving birth to a sick child, which she intends to keep sinless by secluding him from the evils of the outside world. Sandy comes across Ida's skeletal corpse in her bedroom. The group decides to collect supplies and escape from the island in Ida's old rowboat. While exploring the basement, they discover the corpses of Nick and Donna and flee to the beach in a panic.

Eric and Sandy deduce that Ida's son is the one behind the murders, left insane by his life of solitude. With nothing to do but learn from Ida and explore the wilderness, he became immensely strong, a capable hunter, and convinced that all outsiders are a threat to him and his mother. With the death of Ida, he was left without any basis for reality and ate the dogs to survive.

Eric and Sandy go back to the house and get the matches Sandy dropped. Ida's son attacks, breaking down the door. Eric fights using a broken branch, but the mutant fatally breaks his back. He then chases Sandy upstairs into his mother's bedroom. She wraps a blanket around her head and, playing Ida, convinces the mutant to leave his mother's bedroom. When Sandy leaves, the mutant pursues her to the boathouse, where she runs headlong into Carla. The mutant grabs Carla and kills her. Sandy sets Ida's boathouse on fire; although severely burned in the blaze, he attacks Sandy, chasing her up a hill. She yanks a sharp signpost from the ground and impales him. Traumatized by the deaths of her friends and the killing she committed, Sandy sits alone on Ida's dock, strongly resembling a scarred and traumatized Ida.

== Cast ==
- Janet Julian as Sandy Ralston
- David Wallace as Eric Simmons
- John Wildman as Nick Simmons
- Janit Baldwin as Carla Simmons
- Joy Boushel as Donna Blake
- Layne Coleman as Bert Defoe (as Lane Coleman)
- Shay Garner as Ida Parsons (as Shea Garner)
- Page Fletcher as Tom Rice
- John McFadyen as Ed Parsons
- Garry Robbins as Ida's son

== Filming locations ==
The filming of the movie took place in Ontario, Canada.

== Release ==
Humongous was first released in the United States, in a version which was rated R by the MPA, and was only later given a domestic release in Canada, which instead saw an unrated cut of the film.

=== Critical reception ===
Humongous has received mostly negative reviews. On the review aggregator website Rotten Tomatoes, 13% of 8 critics' reviews are positive. On Sneak Previews, Roger Ebert made Humongous his pick for "Dog of the Week", citing its ponderous pacing and repetitive sequences.

In a retrospective review, author and film critic Leonard Maltin gave the film one and a half out of a possible four stars, calling the film "slow-moving", and criticizing the film's overuse of cliches, lack of visibility, and lack of clear shots of the monster. AllMovie's review called it a "plodding horror bore" and commented, "whatever interest this deathly dull flick may have mustered is completely obscured by some of the murkiest cinematography on record; the fact that nearly every scene is shrouded in complete darkness may prove a blessing in disguise." Tim Brayton from Antagony & Ecstasy called the film "Junk" and criticized the characterization as being "of limited interest" but complimented the unique villain and said the acting is better than in most slasher films. Justin Kerswell from Hysteria Lives! gave the film 2.5 out of 5 stars, writing, "HUMONGOUS seems to desperately want to be a hefty helping of true American Gothic, but in reality it's far too cheesy to be very macabre or even generate many true thrills."

For the film's 35th Anniversary, Dave J. Wilson from Dread Central wrote a retrospective on the film, noting its similarities with Joe D'Amato's 1980 film Antropophagus, but arguing that it was superior to that earlier effort. Wilson stated that, while the film was no classic, it did not deserve the obscurity and low user ratings that it was given. Wilson remarked that the characters Nick and Donna are obnoxious and unlikable, but concluded his assessment, "Atmospheric, brutal, sleazy, suspenseful and tense, a monstrous villain, and an energetic finale, this is an entertaining little slasher flick."

Todd Martin from HorrorNews.net called the film a "great little flick that has gone somewhat unnoticed for way too long". In his review, Martin commended the premise, death scenes, soundtrack, and suspense, while criticizing the poor lighting of some scenes. Kurt Dahlke from DVD Talk wrote in his review of the film, "Though derivative of other Slasher Movies, plagued by the annoying improbabilities of all A-to-B horror efforts, filled with bickering dorks, and pretty slow to get started, Humongous eventually gets to a weird, frenetic payoff". Tom Becker from DVD Verdict commented, "While it might not be the shocker it should be, Humongous is a pretty entertaining bit of horror fluff from the days when people took this stuff seriously". Jack Sommersby from eFilmCritic.com awarded the film a score of 3 out 4 stating, "It's perfect for audiences looking for an undemanding, scary good time, along with those longing to see the drop-dead gorgeous Janet Julian in a skimpy bikini".

=== Home media ===
Humongous made its debut on DVD on Nov 15, 2011, published by Scorpion Releasing. It has also been released on Blu-ray by Scorpion Releasing.
