= Al Hine =

American novelist

Al Hine (1915–1974) was a reporter, novelist, and movie producer who wrote numerous books including Lord Love a Duck, which was made into a movie starring Tuesday Weld and Roddy McDowall, and pop novels based on the Bewitched TV series and the Beatles' movie Help!.

== Personal ==
In 1950, Hine married children's literature author Sesyle Joslin, with whom he often collaborated on writing projects.

== Writing career ==
During World War II, Hine wrote for Yank, the Army Weekly magazine as a staff correspondent from July 1943 to December 1945. He developed a wry, smooth writing style filled with sexual innuendo that later served him well in crafting popular novels. For example, in the July 7, 1944, issue of Yank Hine wrote about a lucky fighting cock in "Yanks at Home Abroad":

Persian Field Command – Army pets range from the auk to the zebra, but a trucking station in northern Iran proudly claims a simple barnyard fowl as its mascot. The rooster, a medium-sized Mediterranean Red, doesn’t even have a name as yet, but if you believe its owner, T-5 Wallace Grube of New York, N.Y., it is potentially the best fighting cock in the history of the sport.
The Red, a well-fed fowl with an iridescent feathered neck that sparkles like the rainbow, has one of the finest harems in the Moslem Middle East. He struts about the yard daily, the idol of six curvesome hens and the envy of his GI masters.

Hine and his wife, Sesyle Joslin, coauthored the children's book Is There a Mouse in the House? (Macmillan, 1965). Under the name "G. B. Kirtland" they wrote One Day in Ancient Rome (Harcourt, 1961), One Day in Elizabethan England (Harcourt, 1962), and One Day in Aztec Mexico (Harcourt, 1963).

Hine's novel Lord Love a Duck (Atheneum: 1961) told the story of Alan Musgrave, a confident high school student skilled at karate and hypnosis who calls himself 'Mollymauk' after a rare bird. When Musgrave meets attractive Barbara Ann Greene, he uses his talents to help her get what she wants in life. The novel was made into an award-winning comedy film in 1966 starring Tuesday Weld and Roddy McDowell.

His novel Bewitched (1965: Dell Publishing) adapted several first season teleplays of the popular TV series by the same name. According to the publisher, "They were young, married, and doing what comes supernaturally!" Hine wrote an original novel based on I Dream of Jeannie (1966: Pocket Books) under the pseudonym "Dennis Brewster". According to the back cover's blurb, "Viewers who have roared at the astronautical antics of Captain Nelson and his sprightly imp, Jeannie, can now read this madcap, laugh-filled adventure of that wacky twosome from blast-off to landing." This is a highly sought-after and rare novel, as its publisher Pocket Books had not properly optioned rights to the series (there is neither network nor studio indicia on the book or its copyright page, nor is the show's creator, Sidney Sheldon, credited), which led to legal action and the book being quickly pulled from the shelves.

Hine was a frequent contributor to magazines such as The Saturday Review, Collier's Weekly, Holiday, and the Saturday Evening Post. He also dabbled in film and was listed as an executive producer of the movie Lord of the Flies.

== Partial bibliography ==
- An Unfound Door, original novel (hardcover: Little, Brown and Company, 1951; paperback: Bantam Books, 1952)
- The Birthday Boy, original novel (hardcover: Charles Scribner's Sons, 1959; paperback title: View from the Top, Popular Library, 1962)
- D-Day: The Invasion of Europe (American Heritage Publishing: 1961)
- View from the Top, re-titled paperback reissue of The Birthday Boy (Popular Library, 1962)
- Lord Love a Duck, original novel, basis of the film (hardcover: Atheneum: 1961; paperback title: The Innocent Infidels, Ace Books, 1963)
- The Innocent Infidels, re-titled paperback reissue of Lord Love a Duck (Ace Books, 1963)
- The Unsinkable Molly Brown, novelization of the screenplay by Helen Deutsch (Gold Medal Books: 1964), based on the Broadway musical: music and lyrics by Meredith Willson, book by Richard Morris
- This Land Is Mine: An Anthology of American Verse (1965)
- Bewitched, novelization of seven teleplays from the television series (Dell Publishing, 1965)
- The Beatles in Help!, novelization of the screenplay by Marc Behm and Charles Wood (Dell: 1965)
- Bus Riley's Back in Town, novelization of the screenplay by William Inge (Popular Library, 1965)
- I Dream of Jeannie as "Dennis Brewster"; an original novel based on the TV series (Pocket Books, 1966)
- Promise Her Anything as "Bradford Street"; novelization of the screenplay by William Peter Blatty (Dell, 1966)
- The Glass Bottom Boat as "Bradford Street"; novelization of the screenplay by Everett Freeman (Dell, 1966)
- In Like Flint as "Bradford Street"; novelization of the screenplay by Hal Fimberg (Dell: 1967), the follow-up to Our Man Flint (novelized by Jack Pearl)
- Primus as "Bradford Street"; an original novel based on the syndicated Ivan Tors TV series (Bantam, 1971)
- Signs and Portents, paperback original novel, (Avon Books, 1973)
- Our Agent in Rome is Missing, no author attribution, a Nick Carter-Killmaster novel (Award Books, 1973)
- Massacre in Milan, no author attribution, a Nick Carter-Killmaster novel (Award Books, 1974)
- For Pete's Sake, novelization of the screenplay by Martin Erlichman and Stanley Shapiro (Avon Books, 1974)
- Juggernaut, novelization of the screenplay by "Richard DeKoker" (Richard Alan Simmons) and possibly Alan Plater (unattributed) (Bantam, 1974). Plater rewrote Simmons' script with director Richard Lester (uncredited), causing an unhappy Simmons to take a pseudonymous screenwriting credit. Since Plater is not cited on the novel, Hine may have worked from an earlier draft by Simmons alone.
- Liberty Belle, paperback original novel (Ballantine Books, 1975)
- Brother Owl, a fictional memoir of the Mohawk chief Joseph Brant (1980)
