= Taliesin Jaffe =

American voice actor and voice director

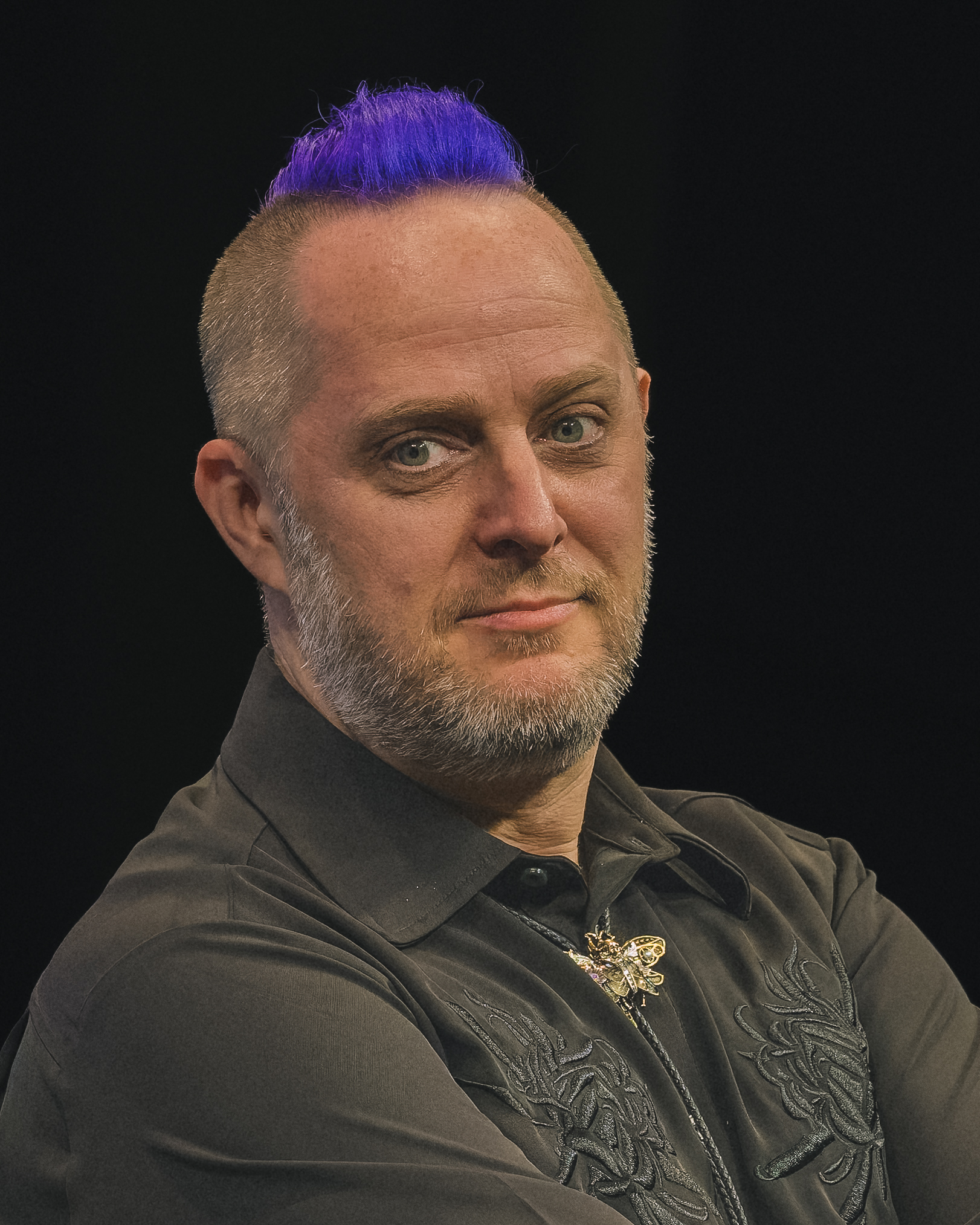
- Jaffe at GalaxyCon Raleigh in 2026
- Born: Los Angeles, California, U.S.
- Other names: Talis Axelrod; T. Axelrod; Taliesin Axelrod
- Occupations: Voice actor; voice director; screenwriter
- Years active: 1983–present
- Parent(s): Robert Jaffe (father); Nina Axelrod (mother)
- Relatives: Steven-Charles Jaffe (uncle); Jonathan Axelrod (uncle); Steven G. Axelrod (uncle); George Axelrod (maternal grandfather); Herb Jaffe (paternal grandfather)
- Website: critrole.com/members/taliesin-jaffe/

Taliesin Jaffe (/ˈtælɪsən ˈdʒæfi/ TAL-ih-sən JAFF-ee) is an American voice actor, voice director, and screenwriter. He has worked on English-dubbing roles for anime and video games. He is a cast member on Critical Role, a web series in which he plays Dungeons & Dragons with other voice actors. Jaffe has also frequently voiced the Flash in Mortal Kombat vs. DC Universe and Injustice 2.

== Personal life ==
Jaffe was born in Los Angeles, the son of actress Nina Axelrod and film producer Robert Jaffe. His maternal grandfather was screenwriter George Axelrod, while his paternal grandfather was film producer Herb Jaffe. He has two brothers and a sister. Jaffe is bisexual.

== Career ==
=== Life and voice acting ===
Jaffe began his career as a child actor, appearing in films such as Mr. Mom and 2010: The Year We Make Contact, and had membership of the Screen Actor's Guild at the age of seven months. On television, he had guest appearances on such series as The Facts of Life and Amazing Stories. In 1985, Jaffe was a regular on the short-lived ABC sitcom Hail to the Chief as Willy Mansfield, son of the fictional first female president of the United States, who was played by Patty Duke. From 1987 to 1989, Jaffe played Kenny Granger on She's the Sheriff, co-starring with Suzanne Somers. In a 2018 interview, Jaffe discussed how he was offered the role of Brian Tanner on ALF, but indicated that his parents turned it down. After several years, Jaffe did not enjoy being a child actor. After a bad audition, his father told him he could either put in more effort for more roles or quit acting, and Jaffe—having not previously realized that quitting was an option—immediately chose to quit.

Jaffe was a member of an AV club at school and his friends and he would create their own English dubs of anime using the club's equipment. After high school, Jaffe made a demonstration tape using his dubbing work, which led to his career in anime dubbing and voice direction.

=== Critical Role Productions ===
In the actual play web series Critical Role, he played Percival "Percy" Fredrickstein von Musel Klossowski de Rolo III in Campaign One, Mollymauk Tealeaf, Caduceus Clay, and Kingsley Tealeaf in Campaign Two, Ashton Greymoore in Campaign Three, and Bolaire Lathalia in Campaign Four. Critical Role was both the Webby Winner and the People's Voice Winner in the "Games (Video Series & Channels)" category at the 2019 Webby Awards; the show was also both a Finalist and the Audience Honor Winner in the "Games" category at the 2019 Shorty Awards. The show was originally broadcast on the Geek & Sundry network until early 2019, when the cast and crew left to set up their own production company, Critical Role Productions. Soon after, they aimed to raise $750,000 on Kickstarter to create an animated series of their first campaign, but ended up raising over $11 million. In November 2019, Amazon Prime Video acquired the streaming rights to the animated series The Legend of Vox Machina; Jaffe reprised his role as Percy.

In May 2023, Darrington Press imprint announced the upcoming Candela Obscura campaign setting co-created by Jaffe and Chris Lockey for the Illuminated Worlds tabletop role-playing game system. The Candela Obscura Quickstart Guide was released on May 25 with the Candela Obscura Core Rulebook scheduled for release later in 2023. The release of the Quickstart Guide corresponds with the release of the new monthly horror–themed actual play web series titled Candela Obscura created by Critical Role Productions; Jaffe serves as the show's Lightkeeper who provides the characters their mission each episode.

== Acting credits ==
=== Anime ===
List of voice performances in anime
| Year | Title | Role | Notes | Source |
|---|---|---|---|---|
| 1991 | 3×3 Eyes | Fei-Oh / Frog Demon | | |
| 1996 | The Vision of Escaflowne | Gaou Fanel | | |
| 1997 | Burn-Up Excess | Tabuchi / Car Salesman / Lead Robber | | |
| 1999 | Di Gi Charat | Takeshi | | |
| 2000 | NieA 7 | Wakaba the Cat / Man Eating Flower / Supermarket Clerk / Records Worker | | |
| 2001 | Hellsing | Hellsing Member / Assistant / Leif / Jack | | |
| 2002 | I"s | Jun Koshinae | | |
| 2002 | I My Me! Strawberry Eggs | Koji Mori | | |
| 2003 | Ikki Tousen | Kannei Kouha / Shizen Ousou | | |
| 2003 | R.O.D the TV | Ryuji Kitayama | | |
| 2003 | Rumic Theater | Takanezawa | | |
| 2003 | Texhnolyze | Inui | | |
| 2004 | DearS | Takeya Ikuhara | | |
| 2004 | Melody of Oblivion | Kuron / Young Tsunagi / Wakadan / True-False Parrot | | |
| 2004 | Monster | Adolf Junkers | | |
| 2004 | Paranoia Agent | Shinsuke Hatomura | | |
| 2004–05 | Beck | Keith / Steve | | |
| 2005 | Girls Bravo | Fake Poyon | | |
| 2005 | Gun Sword | Wild Bunch D / Buchi | | |
| 2005 | Speed Grapher | Jouji 'Joe' Kitazawa | | |
| 2005–06 | Black Cat | Preta Ghoul | | |
| 2005–06 | Tsubasa: Reservoir Chronicle | Shougo Asagi | | |
| 2006 | Kamichu! | Kenkichi Hitotsubashi / Akikan Korogashi | | |
| 2006–09 | Hellsing Ultimate | Wild Geese | | |
| 2009 | Kurokami | Yakumo | | |
| 2009 | One Piece | Basil Hawkins | | |
| 2011–14 | Mobile Suit Gundam Unicorn | Aaron Terzieff | | |
| 2012 | Aquarion EVOL | Kagura | | |
| 2012 | Fairy Tail the Movie: Phoenix Priestess | Dyst | | |
| 2014 | Black Butler: Book of Murder | Arthur | | |
| 2014 | Dragon Ball Z: Battle of Gods | Sushi Chef | | |
| 2014 | Space Dandy | Prosecutor | | |
| 2014–15 | Garo: The Animation | Michael | | |
| 2015 | Fairy Tail | Skiadrum | | |
| 2015–16 | Garo: Crimson Moon | Ashiya Douman | | |
| 2015–16 | Hetalia: The World Twinkle | Britain | | |
| 2017–18 | Garo: Vanishing Line | Sword | | |
| 2019 | One Piece: Stampede | Basil Hawkins | | |

=== Animation ===
List of voice performances in animation
| Year | Title | Role | Notes | Source |
|---|---|---|---|---|
| 2022–present | The Legend of Vox Machina | Percival "Percy" Fredrickstein von Musel Klossowski de Rolo III, Lord Frederick de Rolo, Various voices | Executive producer | |
| 2025–present | The Mighty Nein | Mollymauk Tealeaf, Various voices | Executive producer | |

=== Live-action ===
List of performances in live-action roles
| Year | Title | Role | Notes | Source |
Film and television
| 1983 | Mr. Mom | Kenny Butler | | |
| 1984 | 2010: The Year We Make Contact | Christopher Floyd | | |
| 1984 | St. Elsewhere | Jimmy Hassett | Episode: "Fade to White" | |
| 1984 | The Facts of Life | Danny Slater | Episode "Next Door" | |
| 1985 | Hail to the Chief | Willy Mansfield | | |
| 1985 | Explorers | Ludwig Müller | | |
| 1986 | Amazing Stories | Mark / Scott | Episode "Boo!" | |
| 1986 | Child's Cry | Eric Townsend | Television film | |
| 1987 | Convicted: A Mother's Story | Grant | Television film | |
| 1987–89 | She's the Sheriff | Kenny Granger | 45 episodes | |
| 2010 | House | Renaissance Faire Actor | Episode: "Knight Fall" | |
| 2018 | House of Demons | Dave | | |
Web series and podcasts
| 2012 | Batgirl: Spoiled | The Riddler | Fan-made web series | |
| 2015–present | Critical Role | Percival "Percy" Fredrickstein von Musel Klossowski de Rolo III (campaign 1) | Cast member; creator-owned actual play web series | |
| 2015–present | Critical Role | Mollymauk Tealeaf/Kingsley Tealeaf, Caduceus Clay (campaign 2) | Cast member; creator-owned actual play web series | |
| 2015–present | Critical Role | Ashton Greymoore, Asha (campaign 3) | Cast member; creator-owned actual play web series | |
| 2015–present | Critical Role | Bolaire Lathalia (campaign 4) | Cast member; creator-owned actual play web series | |
| 2016–19 | The Wednesday Club | Himself | Comics talk show co-host | |
| 2017 | Sagas of Sundry: Dread | Kayden | Cast member | |
| 2018–21 | L.A. by Night | Carver | Guest star; 4 episodes | |
| 2019 | MAME Drop | Himself | Retro arcade game show host | |
| 2021 | Um, Actually | Himself | Trivia game show presented by Dropout; Episode: "1984, Hunter x Hunter, Supernatural" | |
| 2023–24 | Candela Obscura | The Lightkeeper | Cast member and co-creator | |
| 2025 | Weird Kids | Himself | Podcast co-host | |
| 2025 | Age of Umbra | August | Actual play limited series using the Daggerheart system | |
| 2025 | Dirty Laundry | Himself | Social deduction game show presented by Dropout; Episode: "Who Joined an Ex on Their Honeymoon?" | |
| 2027 | Reign of the Weredragon † | TBA | Actual play series using the Daggerheart system | |

=== Video games ===
List of voice performances in video games
| Year | Title | Role | Notes | Source |
|---|---|---|---|---|
| 2004–present | World of Warcraft | Highlord Darion Mograine | | |
| 2006 | Valkyrie Profile 2: Silmeria | Rufus / Gyne | Uncredited | |
| 2008 | Final Fantasy IV | Edge | | |
| 2008 | Mortal Kombat vs. DC Universe | The Flash, Security Guard | Credited as T. Axelrod | |
| 2008 | World of Warcraft: Wrath of the Lich King | Highlord Darion Mograine / Devourer of Souls | | |
| 2008 | Street Fighter IV and related updates | Blanka / Adon | | |
| 2009 | Final Fantasy Crystal Chronicles: The Crystal Bearers | Additional voices | Credited as T. Axelrod | |
| 2010 | Sengoku Basara: Samurai Heroes | Additional voices | | |
| 2010 | World of Warcraft: Cataclysm | Admiral Ripsnarl | | |
| 2012 | Street Fighter X Tekken | Blanka | | |
| 2013 | Final Fantasy XIV | Thancred | | |
| 2014 | Smite | Slaughterhouse Chaac | | |
| 2014 | The Legend of Heroes: Trails of Cold Steel II | Thomas Lysander | | |
| 2015 | Pillars of Eternity | Uldric | | |
| 2015 | Xenoblade Chronicles X | Additional voices | Credited as T. Axelrod | |
| 2016 | Plants vs. Zombies: Garden Warfare 2 | Crazetopher David "Crazy Dave" Blazing III | | |
| 2016 | Fallout 4: Automatron | Male Robot Voice / Jackson / Jagger / Thomas Harkin | | Tweet |
| 2016 | Street Fighter V | Blanka | | |
| 2016 | God Eater 2: Rage Burst | Haruomi Makabe | | |
| 2016 | World of Warcraft: Legion | Highlord Darion Mograine | | |
| 2017 | Fire Emblem Heroes | Bruno / Navarre / Cain | | |
| 2017 | Tales of Berseria | Eizen | | |
| 2017 | Hearthstone | Highlord Darion Mograine | | |
| 2017 | Injustice 2 | The Flash | | |
| 2017 | Zero Escape: The Nonary Games | Snake | | |
| 2018 | Sushi Striker: The Way of Sushido | Masa | Credited as T. Axelrod | |
| 2018 | Lego DC Super-Villains | Simon Baz | | |
| 2018 | Pillars of Eternity II: Deadfire | Eothas / Percival "Percy" Fredrickstein von Musel Klossowski de Rolo III | | |
| 2018 | Spider-Man | Additional voices | | |
| 2019 | Plants vs. Zombies: Battle for Neighborville | Crazetopher David "Crazy Dave" Blazing III | | |
| 2020 | World of Warcraft: Shadowlands | Highlord Darion Mograine | | |
| 2020 | Fallout 76: Steel Dawn | Dagger's Lieutenant | | |
| 2020 | Horizon Forbidden West | Thurlis | | |
| 2022 | ELEX II | Jax | | |
| 2025 | Dispatch | Bartender | | |

=== Audio books ===
List of voice performances in audio books
| Year | Title | Role | Notes | Source |
|---|---|---|---|---|
| 2022 | Critical Role: The Mighty Nein – The Nine Eyes of Lucien | Mollymauk Tealeaf, Caduceus Clay | | |
| 2025 | Critical Role: Vox Machina - Stories Untold | Narrator, Percival "Percy" Fredrickstein von Musel Klossowski de Rolo III | | |
| 2026 | Critical Role: Mighty Nein - Stories Untold | Narrator | also Co-Author | |

== Production credits ==
=== Voice director ===
==== Anime ====
List of credit as voice director
| Year | Title | Notes | Source |
|---|---|---|---|
| 1992 | Spirit of Wonder | | |
| 1998 | Nazca | | |
| 1999 | Amazing Nurse Nanako | | |
| 2000 | NieA_7 | | |
| 2001 | Hellsing | | |
| 2003 | R.O.D the TV | | |
| 2004–05 | Beck | Co-directed with Christopher Bevins | |
| 2006 | Origin: Spirits of the Past | | |
| 2006 | Speed Grapher | | |
| 2006–09 | Hellsing Ultimate | | |
| 2008–09 | Skip Beat! | | |
| 2009 | Sengoku Basara: Samurai Kings | | |

==== Video games ====
List of credit as voice director in video games
| Year | Title |
|---|---|
| 2008 | Street Fighter IV |
| 2010 | Sengoku Basara: Samurai Heroes |
| 2011 | Marvel vs. Capcom 3: Fate of Two Worlds |
| 2011 | Ultimate Marvel vs. Capcom 3 |
| 2012 | Street Fighter X Tekken |
| 2014 | Akiba's Trip: Undead & Undressed |
| 2015 | Lord of Magna: Maiden Heaven |
| 2016 | Street Fighter V |
| 2022 | Elex II |

=== Screenwriter ===
List of credits as screenwriter
| Year | Title |
|---|---|
| 1991 | 3×3 Eyes |
| 1992 | Spirit of Wonder |
| 1996 | Starship Girl Yamamoto Yohko |
| 1998 | Nazca |
| 1999 | Amazing Nurse Nanako |
| 2000 | NieA_7 |
| 2001 | Hellsing |
| 2002 | Haibane Renmei |
| 2003 | R.O.D. the TV |
| 2004 | Monster |
| 2005 | Hell Girl |
| 2006 | Ergo Proxy |
| 2007 | Romeo × Juliet |
