= Joy Boushel =

Canadian actress

- Born: 1958 or 1959 (age 67–68); Canada
- Other name: Joy Bushell
- Education: LaSalle College; Concordia University
- Occupation: Actress
- Years active: 1980–1990

Joy Boushel (born 1958 or 1959) is a Montreal-based former actress, and more recently, marketing strategist.

== Early life and career ==
A self-described "country girl" from Canada's eastern provinces, Boushel spent a year at LaSalle College before realizing that a career in fashion design was probably not for her. She later attended Concordia University.

Boushel appeared in several movies and TV shows from 1980 to 1990.

Boushel's acting career has consisted of Pick-up Summer (1980), Terror Train (1980), Quest for Fire (1981), Humongous (1982), Thrillkill (1984), The Fly (1986), Keeping Track (1986), Look Who's Talking (1989), and Cursed (1990).

== Personal life ==
As of June 2003, Boushel–described as a then-unemployed marketing agent–was, at 10 years and counting, the longest-standing of three roommates residing in a three-storey townhouse located on St. Famille Street, near Pine Avenue, which the former actress characterized as the house she had "always dreamed of ... an old brick house with a winding staircase and a beautiful back yard in the heart of the city".

== Filmography ==
Year	Title	Role	Notes
1980	Pick-up Summer	Sally	
1980	Terror Train	Pet	
1981	Quest for Fire	The Ulam Tribe	
1982	Humongous	Donna Blake	
1984	Thrillkill	Maggie	
1986	Spearfield's Daughter	Billy Locke	
1986	The Fly	Tawny	
1986	Keeping Track	Judy	
1987	Friday the 13th: The Series	Red Head	Ep. 1.3: "Cupid's Quiver"
1987	Diamonds	NA	Ep. 1.6: "Class Reunion"
1989	Look Who's Talking	Melissa	
1990	Cursed	Susan	(final film role)
