= Goodbye Charlie =

1964 film by Vincente Minnelli

- Theatrical release poster
- Directed by: Vincente Minnelli
- Screenplay by: Harry Kurnitz
- Based on: Goodbye Charlie by George Axelrod
- Produced by: David Weisbart
- Starring: Tony Curtis; Debbie Reynolds; Pat Boone; Joanna Barnes; Laura Devon; Walter Matthau
- Cinematography: Milton Krasner
- Edited by: John W. Holmes
- Music by: André Previn
- Production company: Venice Productions
- Distributed by: 20th Century Fox
- Release date: November 18, 1964
- Running time: 117 minutes
- Country: United States
- Language: English
- Budget: $3.5 million
- Box office: $3.7 million (US and Canada rentals)

Goodbye Charlie is a 1964 American fantasy comedy film directed by Vincente Minnelli and starring Tony Curtis, Debbie Reynolds, and Pat Boone. The CinemaScope film is about a callous womanizer who gets his just reward after a jealous husband kills him. It is based on the 1959 play of the same name by George Axelrod. The play also provided the basis for the 1991 film Switch, starring Ellen Barkin and Jimmy Smits.

== Plot ==
Philandering Hollywood screenwriter Charlie Sorrel is shot and killed by Hungarian film producer Sir Leopold Sartori when he is caught fooling around with Leopold's wife, Rusty. Charlie's best and only friend, novelist George Tracy, arrives at Charlie's Malibu beach house for the memorial service, after an exhausting series of flights from Paris that have left him broke. There are only three people there: Charlie's agent and two ex-girlfriends. George does his best to eulogize his friend, but there is little to be said in favor of Charlie, whose will named George executor of his estate, which is a mess of debts and unpaid taxes.

Soon after the guests leave, George is awakened by the sudden appearance of Bruce Minton III assisting a petite blonde woman swathed in a huge overcoat. Bruce came to her aid when he found her dazed and wandering on the road, completely naked. She does not remember much, but she recognized Charlie's house as they drove past it and it made her feel safe. Bruce rushes off to a dinner engagement, leaving George to handle the delirious woman. The next morning, George awakes to her screams as she gazes at herself in a mirror. She recalls that she is Charlie, reincarnated as a woman. After getting over the shock, she convinces George of her identity by telling him about a dirty trick that she had recently played on him as a man. George realizes that this must be a case of karmic retribution for all of the women that Charlie had used and betrayed.

All manner of complications arise as Charlie decides to take advantage of the situation. George helps her by establishing her as Charlie's widow, figuring out their finances—they are both broke—and boosting her morale. From the beginning, Charlie finds herself subject to a whole new set of emotions and sensations. Her masculine mannerisms begin to fade, partly because Charlie is a consummate actor, but also because the change is more than skin deep. At one point, she bursts into uncontrollable tears. George comforts her as he would a weeping girl, wiping her tears and stroking her hair to calm her, then pulls back, disturbed at the tenderness.

Although Charlie has changed her gender, she is unable to change her ways. She attempts to solve her money problems by blackmailing two of the male Charlie's wealthy married lovers and by marrying Bruce for money. The plans fall apart when Bruce drunkenly confesses the depth of his love for her. Charlie takes pity on him and slips the engagement ring into his hand.

Eventually, in a grim role-reversal that she recognizes when it happens, Charlie is chased around the house by Leopold, who cheerfully spouts amorous nonsense and is intent on having sex with her. Rusty arrives, gun in hand, and, just as Charlie climbs onto the terrace railing with intent to jump, Rusty shoots her, and she plunges into the ocean below. George, who has arrived in the midst of the melee, leaps after Charlie, but there is no sign of a body. After admonishing the Sartoris for their actions, George orders them to leave and never tell anyone about it. The couple reconcile, and Leopold promises eternal gratitude to George.

Later that night, as George hears the sound of a woman's voice repeatedly calling "Charlie", a woman who looks identical to Charlie Sorrel's reincarnated appearance appears on the terrace with her Great Dane, named Charlie. George quickly establishes that she is a real person, Virginia Mason. Assessing George, Virginia decides that he needs food. As George and Virginia talk in the kitchen, they develop a mutual attraction. The dog goes into the living room and finds Charlie's secret cache of vodka in the bookcase (behind War and Peace). The bottle falls and breaks; Charlie laps a bit from the floor and, looking heavenward, begins to howl.

== Cast ==
- Tony Curtis as George Tracy
- Debbie Reynolds as Charles Sorel / Virginia Mason
- Pat Boone as Bruce Minton III
- Joanna Barnes as Janine Highland
- Ellen Burstyn (credited as Ellen McRae) as Franny Salzman
- Laura Devon as Rusty Sartori
- Martin Gabel as Morton Craft
- Roger C. Carmel (credited as Roger Carmel) as Inspector Frank McGill
- Harry Madden as Charles Sorrel
- Myrna Hansen as Starlet
- Michael Romanoff as restaurant patron
- Michael Jackson as himself
- Anthony Eustrel as Butler (as Antony Eustrel)
- Donna Michelle as woman doing the twist on yacht
- Walter Matthau as Sir Leopold Sartori

== Play ==
Goodbye Charlie
- Original language: English
- Written by: George Axelrod
- Genre: Comedy
- Setting: The beach house of the late Charlie Sorel, a few miles north of Malibu, California. The present.

Premiere
- Date: December 16, 1959
- Place: Lyceum Theatre, New York

George Axelrod's play debuted on Broadway in 1959 starring Lauren Bacall and Sydney Chaplin, produced by Leland Hayward, and directed by Axelrod. It was not a success, running for 109 performances. Film rights to the play were bought by 20th Century Fox before it premiered for $150,000 plus a percentage of the profits. James Garner and Marilyn Monroe were discussed as stars. Brooks Atkinson of The New York Times said it played like "an extended vaudeville sketch".

== Production ==
Darryl F. Zanuck offered the project to Billy Wilder after he returned to Fox, but Wilder turned it down, saying that "no self-respecting picture maker would ever want to work for your company". (Zanuck had just forced Joseph L. Mankiewicz to re-cut Cleopatra (1963)).

Playwright Harry Kurnitz was hired to write the script, and Tony Curtis was attached early. Vincente Minnelli was hired to direct his first movie after leaving MGM.

== Reception ==
According to Fox records, the film needed to earn $7 million in rentals for the studio to break even on its release. The film earned $4,555,000. Rotten Tomatoes, a review-aggregation website, gives the film has 50% rating, based on 8 contemporary and modern reviews.

=== Critical response ===
The New York Times critic Bosley Crowther led his review of the film by panning the play and the film: "… 'Goodbye, Charlie,' was bad enough on the stage. On the screen, it is a bleak conglomeration of outrageous whimsies and stupidities. And it has Debbie Reynolds and Tony Curtis so sadly cast in distasteful roles that it causes even a hardened moviegoer to turn away from it in pain and shame." Crowther concluded, "Under Vincente Minnelli's direction, the film has a certain style and pace. But it is much more vulgar than stylish, much more sluggish and dull than fast."

In 2019, Stephen Vagg reviewed the film in Diabolique magazine: "It's not that shocking to see the star of Spartacus (1960)... make moves on a woman not knowing she's a man, but it is a surprise to see Boone to do it. He later admitted to having a drinking problem around this time and shot some scenes for the movie while drunk.... This film remains resolutely undiscovered by queer/feminist film analysts, despite its subject matter and bisexual director... I think this is in part because Reynolds's performance is so utterly sexless. It holds any feeling of kinkiness at bay. However, there's no denying it because Boone plays a guy who effectively tries to make out with a dude." The magazine also points out that the opening scene features a tracking shot at a party where a man gets upset and shoots the man having sex with his wife, similar to Boogie Nights (1997).

== Television adaptation ==
In 1985, Goodbye Charlie was made into a TV series (starring Suzanne Somers as the reincarnated Charlie), but only the pilot episode was broadcast.

== See also ==
- List of American films of 1964
