= The Secret Life of an American Wife =

1968 comedy film directed by George Axelrod

- Theatrical release poster
- Directed by: George Axelrod
- Written by: George Axelrod
- Produced by: George Axelrod
- Starring: Walter Matthau; Anne Jackson; Patrick O'Neal; Edy Williams
- Cinematography: Leon Shamroy
- Edited by: Harry W. Gerstad
- Music by: Billy May
- Distributed by: 20th Century Fox
- Release date: June 25, 1968
- Running time: 92 minutes
- Country: United States
- Language: English
- Box office: $3,000,000 (rentals)

The Secret Life of an American Wife is a 1968 comedy film written, produced and directed by George Axelrod. The film was released by 20th Century Fox in 1968, and was considered a box-office failure. It features a music score by Billy May. Edy Williams has a supporting role in the film as the Laytons' blonde bombshell neighbor.

== Plot ==
Victoria Layton is a suburban housewife who is dissatisfied with her marriage, and fears that her sex appeal is fading. Her husband works as a press agent, and his biggest client is a movie star who is known as an international sex symbol.

On hearing that The Movie Star indulges in the services of prostitutes, Victoria decides to surreptitiously pose as one to prove to herself that she is still sexually attractive.

== Cast ==
- Walter Matthau as The Movie Star
- Anne Jackson as Victoria Layton
- Patrick O'Neal as Tom Layton
- Edy Williams as Susie Steinberg
- Richard Bull as Howard
- Paul Napier as Herb Steinberg
- Gary Brown as Jimmy
- Albert Carrier as Jean-Claude

== Production ==
George Axelrod later recalled he "screwed up" the film.

Stories have their natural form. That was a play, it was going to be a play, and it should have stayed a play. It was a two-character play, two sets, in a hotel. But I had a bust-up with United Artists, I needed a movie, and Dick Zanuck at 20th wanted to buy Secret Life and go with it. Someone says, "You can write and direct and produce"—and it's your own material? Who could say no? I should have said no. Because it was meant to be a play. Besides, I had written it for Frank Sinatra and Shirley MacLaine, and I ended up with Walter Matthau and Anne Jackson, both talented people, but not right for this film . . . which was meant to be a play... It talks itself to death.

== Reception ==
=== Box office ===
According to Fox records, the film required $4,300,000 in rentals to break even, and by December 11, 1970, it had made $3,725,000, for a net loss to the studio.
