= Baruch Harold Wood =

English chess player and writer

Baruch Harold Wood OBE
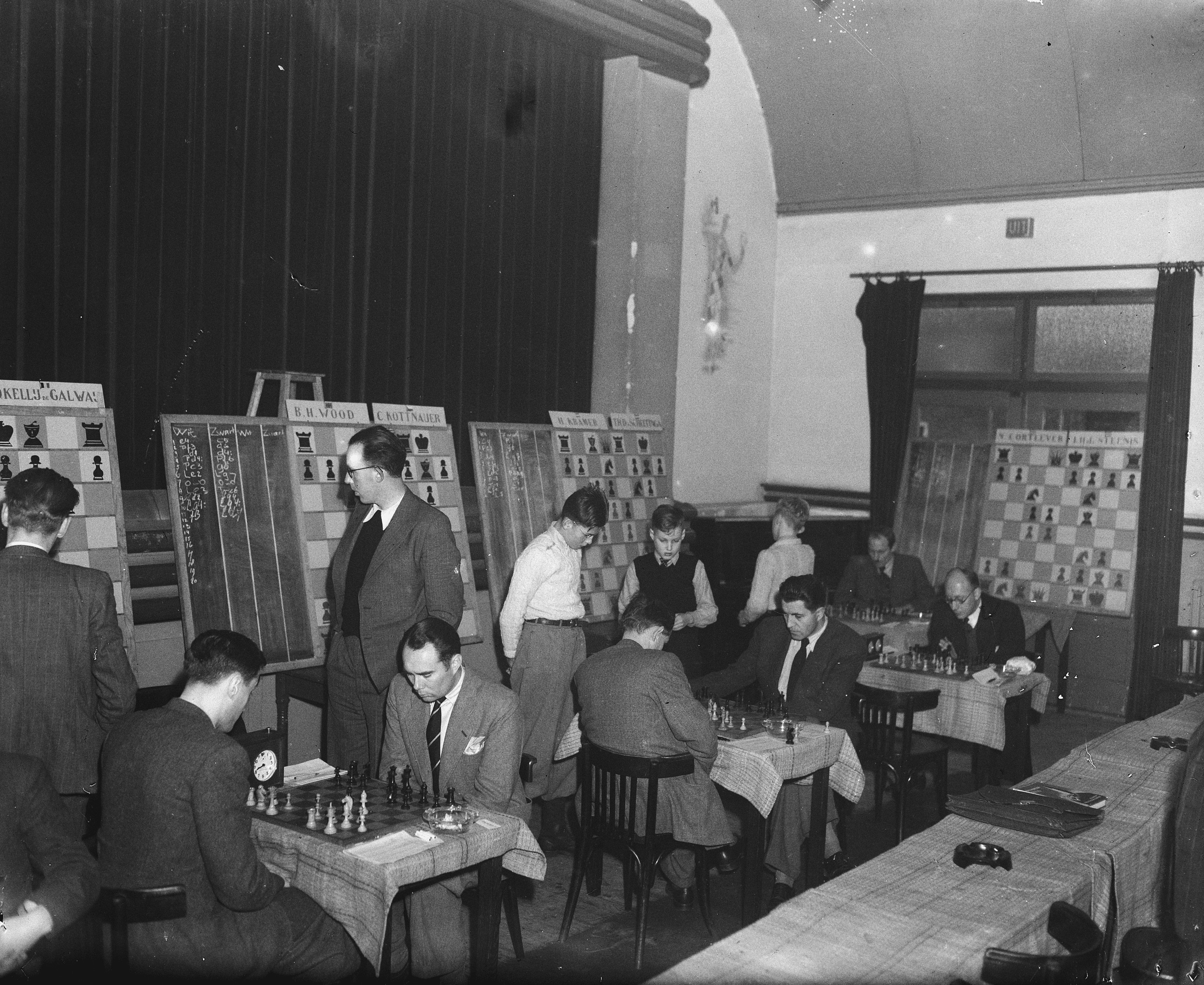
- Wood (in middle, seated, with back to camera), Hoogovens tournament 1948
- Born: Baruch Harold Wood; 13 July 1909; Sheffield, England
- Died: 4 April 1989 (aged 79); Sutton Coldfield, England
- Occupation: Chess writer

Baruch Harold Wood OBE (13 July 1909 – 4 April 1989) was an English chess player, editor and author. He was born in Ecclesall, Sheffield, England.

== Playing career ==
Between 1938 and 1957, Wood won the championship of Warwickshire eight times. In 1939 he represented England at the Chess Olympiad in Buenos Aires. Wood won the tournaments at Baarn (1947), Paignton (1954), Whitby (1963), Tórshavn (1967) and Jersey (1975). He took part in the Gijon International Chess Tournaments of 1947 (finishing fifth), 1948 (second) and 1950 (eighth). Wood tied for fourth–sixth, scoring five points out of nine games, at the 1948–49 Hastings Christmas Chess Congress, 1.5 points behind winner Nicolas Rossolimo. In 1948, he tied for second place at the British Chess Championship held in London. He won the British correspondence chess championship in 1944–45.

== Writings ==
In 1935, Wood founded the magazine CHESS, which became one of the two leading chess magazines in Great Britain. He edited it until 1988, when it was taken over by Pergamon Press. Wood was the chess correspondent for The Daily Telegraph and The Illustrated London News. From 1948 to February 1967, he was responsible for the chess column of the Birmingham Daily Post. He also wrote a popular and often reprinted book, Easy Guide to Chess (Sutton Coldfield 1942), described by Grandmaster Nigel Davies as "one of the best beginners books on the market". His other books include World Championship Candidates Tournament 1953 (Sutton Coldfield 1954) and 100 Victorian Chess Problems (1972).

== Administrative roles ==
From 1946 to 1951, Wood was a president of the ICCA, a forerunner of the ICCF. Wood was a FIDE judge, an international chess arbiter, and the joint founder of the Sutton Coldfield Chess Club. Wood represented England when it joined FIDE, the world chess federation. He was longtime president of the British Schools Chess Association and also of the British Universities Chess Association.

== Family ==
Wood was the son of Baruch Talbot Wood and Florence Muriel Herington. He married Marjory Elizabeth Farrington in October 1936. Wood's daughter Margaret (Peggy) Clarke won the British Girls' Championship in 1952, 1955, and 1956, and was the joint British Ladies' Champion in 1966. Her husband Peter Clarke was a full-time chess player and writer, who finished second in the British Chess Championship five times, represented England in the Chess Olympiads seven times, wrote five chess books, and was the Games Editor of the British Chess Magazine. Wood's sons Christopher, Frank and Philip are also strong chess players. Christopher Baruch Wood is a FIDE Master.
