= Nina Axelrod =

American actress

- Occupations: Film, television actress
- Children: Taliesin Jaffe
- Parent: George Axelrod (father)
- Relatives: Jonathan Axelrod (brother); Steven G. Axelrod (stepbrother)

Nina Axelrod is an American actress who appeared in films and television mainly during the late 1970s through the early 1980s. Since the early 1990s, she has worked as a casting director on films and taught drama in schools.

== Career ==
Her television appearances have included Charlie's Angels and CHiPs. Her noted films include Roller Boogie (1979), the now cult classic, slasher parody Motel Hell (1980), Time Walker (1982), Cross Country (1983) and Critters 3 (1991). In the mid 80s, Axelrod began her present work in film casting. In 1981, Axelrod read for the Rachael character of Ridley Scott's science fiction noir, Blade Runner (1982) and is featured on a screen test of the 2007 DVD release of the Final Cut release, Disc 4 of Blade Runner.

== Personal life ==
She is the daughter of George Axelrod.
