= Goodbye Charlie (play) =

1959 play by George Axelrod

- Original language: English
- Written by: George Axelrod
- Characters: Greg Morris; George Tracy; Franny Saltzman; Irving; Mr. Shriber; Rusty Mayerling; Charlie
- Genre: Drama
- Setting: Malibu, California

Premiere
- Date: December 16, 1959
- Place: Lyceum Theatre, Manhattan, New York City

Goodbye Charlie is a 1959 play written by George Axelrod. It opened on Broadway on December 16, 1959, and closed on March 19, 1960.

== Settings ==
The show takes place at the beach home of Charlie Sorel, a few miles north of Malibu, California.

== Productions ==
The show had five out of town tryouts in 1959, first Nixon Theater in Pittsburgh, Pennsylvania, second was at the Shubert-Lafayette Theatre in Detroit, Michigan, third was at the Hanna Theatre in Cleveland, Ohio, fourth at Ford's Theatre in Baltimore, Maryland, and finally at the Walnut Street Theatre in Philadelphia, Pennsylvania. Later, this production transferred to Broadway at the Lyceum Theatre on December 16, 1959, directed by Axelrod, set design Oliver Smith and lighting design Peggy Clark. The cast included Frank Roberts (Greg Morris), Sydney Chaplin (George Tracy), Michelle Reiner (Franny Saltzman), Clinton Anderson (Irving), Dan Frazer (Mr. Shriber), Sarah Marshall (Rusty Mayerling), and Lauren Bacall (Charlie). Understudies included Jerome Preston Bates (Joe), Don Guillory (Spoon/Flip), Gretchen Hall (Kimber), and Zakiya Young (Cheryl, Taylor).

== Adaptations ==
The play was adapted for film several times:

An eponymous movie starring Debbie Reynolds and Tony Curtis in 1964.

A 1971 German television movie with the title Letzte Grüße, lieber Charlie.

A 1984 television movie starring Suzanne Somers.

== Awards and nominations ==
Year	Award	Category	Nominee	Result
1960	Tony Award	Best Featured Actress in a Play	Sarah Marshall	Nominated
