= Steven G. Axelrod =

American writer

- Born: Steven Gould Axelrod
- Education: University of California, Los Angeles
- Occupation: Writer
- Parent: George Axelrod (father)
- Relatives: Jonathan Axelrod (stepbrother); Nina Axelrod (stepsister); Taliesin Jaffe (nephew)

Steven Gould Axelrod is an American writer. He was a distinguished professor in the department of English at the University of California, Riverside.

In 1978, Axelrod wrote the book Robert Lowell: Life and Art, published by Princeton University Press.
