= Every Little Crook and Nanny =

- Theatrical release poster
- Directed by: Cy Howard
- Screenplay by: Cy Howard; Jonathan Axelrod; Robert Klane
- Based on: Every Little Crook and Nanny (novel) by Evan Hunter
- Produced by: Leonard J. Ackerman
- Starring: Lynn Redgrave; Victor Mature; Paul Sand; Maggie Blye; John Astin; Dom DeLuise
- Cinematography: Philip Lathrop
- Edited by: Henry Berman
- Music by: Fred Karlin
- Distributed by: Metro-Goldwyn-Mayer
- Release date: June 14, 1972
- Running time: 92 minutes
- Country: United States
- Language: English
- Box office: $28,000

Every Little Crook and Nanny is a 1972 comedy film starring Victor Mature who came out of retirement to play the role. It was his first major film role since 1966. "They caught me when I felt like saying yeah," said Mature.

The title is a Spoonerism on the old phrase, "Every little nook and cranny."

== Cast ==
- Lynn Redgrave as Nanny Poole
- Victor Mature as Carmine Ganucci
- Paul Sand as Benny Napkins
- Maggie Blye as Stella Ganucci
- John Astin as Vito Garbugli
- Dom DeLuise as Mario Azzecca
- Austin Pendleton as Luther
- Louise Sorel as Marie
- Phillip Graves as Lewis Ganucci
- Lou Cutell as Landruncolo
- Leopoldo Trieste as Truffatore
- Pat Morita as Nonaka
- Phil Foster as Lt. Bozzaris
- Pat Harrington Jr. as Willie Shakespeare

== See also ==
- List of American films of 1972
