= Cross Country (1983 film) =

- Theatrical release poster
- Directed by: Paul Lynch
- Screenplay by: John Hunter; William Gray
- Based on: Cross Country by Herbert Kastle
- Produced by: Pieter Kroonenburg; David J. Patterson
- Starring: Richard Beymer; Michael Ironside; Nina Axelrod
- Cinematography: René Verzier
- Edited by: Nick Rotundo
- Music by: Chris Rea
- Production companies: Filmline Productions; Yellowbill Finance
- Distributed by: New World Pictures
- Release date: November 18, 1983
- Running time: 103 minutes
- Country: Canada
- Language: English
- Budget: CA$3 million

Cross Country is a 1983 Canadian erotic crime thriller film directed by Paul Lynch and starring Richard Beymer, Michael Ironside, and Nina Axelrod.

== Synopsis ==
A Philadelphia television executive, sought by police for the murder of a call girl, picks up a pair of hitchhikers en route to Los Angeles.

== Cast ==
- Richard Beymer as Evan Bley
- Michael Ironside as Detective Sgt. Ed Roersch
- Nina Axelrod as Lois Hayes
- Brent Carver as John Forrest
- August Schellenberg as Glen Cosgrove

== Production ==
Director Paul Lynch turned down directing duties on Mother Lode to direct this film, which in early stages was briefly known as Black Widows.

The film was shot in 1982 in Montreal on a budget of $3 million, financed by MGM through the recently acquired United Artists. UA Chairman David Begelman didn't like the film and sold the film to New World Pictures.

== Release ==
Cross Country was released in the United States on November 18, 1983.

== Reception ==
Kevin Thomas of the Los Angeles Times praised the film as a "clever thriller" and likened it to a contemporary film noir. Alternately, Don Lechman of the News-Pilot derided the film, deeming it "a disgusting mess... it would be best if the film was buried and never released to any medium."
