= Lord Love a Duck =

1966 film by George Axelrod

- Theatrical poster
- Directed by: George Axelrod
- Screenplay by: Larry H. Johnson; George Axelrod
- Based on: Lord Love a Duck; 1961 novel by Al Hine
- Produced by: George Axelrod
- Starring: Roddy McDowall; Tuesday Weld; Lola Albright; Martin West; Ruth Gordon
- Cinematography: Daniel L. Fapp
- Edited by: William A. Lyon
- Music by: Neal Hefti
- Distributed by: United Artists
- Release date: February 21, 1966 (New York City)
- Running time: 105 minutes
- Country: United States
- Language: English
- Budget: $850,000 or $1.2 million

Lord Love a Duck is a 1966 American teen black comedy-drama film produced, directed and co-written by George Axelrod and starring Roddy McDowall and Tuesday Weld. The film was a satire of popular culture at the time, its targets ranging from progressive education to beach party films. It is based on Al Hine's 1961 novel of the same name.

== Plot ==
From his prison cell, Alan Musgrave dictates his experiences of the previous year, which he dedicated to fulfilling the unending wishes and ambitions of high school senior Barbara Ann Greene. The daughter of Marie, a cocktail waitress sinking unhappily into her forties, Barbara Ann wants every kind of success and for everyone to love her.

Signing a pact with Alan in wet cement, Barbara Ann soon has the 12 cashmere sweaters needed to join an exclusive girls' club. She drops out of school to become the principal's new secretary and gets involved in church activities run by strait-laced but hyper-hormonal Bob Bernard.

When Barbara Ann decides she wants Bob for her husband, Alan facilitates this by keeping Bob's eccentric mother Stella, who disapproves of Barbara Ann, perpetually drunk. Plans nearly go awry when Stella pays Barbara Ann a surprise visit, unbeknownst to Marie that she's Bob's mother, Marie reveals details that contradict what Stella learned previously. Feeling worthless and like an embarrassment to her daughter, Marie commits suicide—although Alan arranges the scene to appear to be an accident for life insurance purposes.

With Marie dead, Bob subsequently marries Barbara Ann. Then she meets producer T. Harrison Belmont, the King of Beach Party Films, and decides to become the biggest star that ever was. Bob refuses, however, to allow his wife to have a Hollywood screen test, so Barbara Ann decides she wants a divorce.

Since Bob's mother frowns upon divorce, Alan takes matters into his own hands to kill Bob. Although Bob proves to be almost indestructible (after several failed attempts ranging from arsenic and belladonna (a.k.a. deadly nightshade) poisoning to a deconstructed automobile and a skateboard slip-and-fall), by graduation time Alan has him in a wheelchair. At the graduation ceremony, Alan pursues Bob with an excavator, apparently killing him and several people on the speakers' platform. Barbara Ann goes on to Hollywood fame in her debut film Bikini Widow, while Alan is sent to prison, dictating that he did it all for love.

== Cast ==
- Roddy McDowall as Alan 'Mollymauk' Musgrave
- Tuesday Weld as Barbara Ann Greene
- Lola Albright as Marie Greene
- Martin West as Bob Bernard
- Ruth Gordon as Stella Bernard
- Harvey Korman as Weldon Emmett
- Sarah Marshall as Miss Schwartz
- Lynn Carey as Sally Grace
- Donald Murphy as Phil Neuhauser
- Max Showalter as Howard Greene
- Joseph Mell as Dr. Milton Lippman
- Dan Frazer as Honest Joe
- Martine Bartlett as Inez
- Jo Collins as Kitten
- Dave Draper as Billy Gibbons
- Donald Foster as Mr. Beverly
- Martin Gabel as T. Harrison "Harry" Belmont (uncredited)

== Production ==
The film was based on a novel published in 1961. The New York Times called the book "hilarious at times and often charmingly wicked."

Film rights were bought in December 1964 by Gordon Carroll and George Axelrod under the banner of their company, Charleston Enterprises. Axelrod called the book "a cross between Andy Hardy and Dr. Strangelove." Larry Johnson wrote the script along with Axelrod.

In May 1965 Roddy McDowall signed to play the lead. United Artists agreed to finance and Axelrod decided to direct. Axelrod had directed three plays on Broadway, Will Success Spoil Rock Hunter?, Once More With Feeling and Goodbye Charlie but this was his first film. Axelrod said he asked George S. Kaufman how to direct and Kaufman said "you get good actors. He was right. And if it's a comedy you don't get Actors Studio actors".

"I'm not really sure why I'm making this picture," said Axelrod. "Maybe I'm just trying to get revenge on my own teenagers. Lord Love a Duck will not be made specifically for the teenage market but teenagers will probably dig it. It puts everything down - society, vulgarity, adolescents. Teenagers like being put down."

Axelrod called the film "pop porn or Dirty Disney. It may yet give bad taste a bad name."

=== Shooting ===
Axelrod used as a music score the sound of teenagers with transistor radios.

He based his visual style on the films of Richard Lester such as A Hard Day's Night and The Knack. "Lester has shown us a freer form," said Axelrod. "I want to get away from the Hollywood syndrome of trying to make every shot look pretty and orderly."

The film was shot over 30 days for $850,000 (equivalent to $8,434,615 in 2025). "There's this gruesome prejudice in Hollywood that a picture made between $750,000 and $1 million cannot make a profit," said Axelrod. "I want to prove that this is nonsense. If I could do that and find new ways of saying things the film at least will serve the useful purpose of puncturing a hole in Hollywood's adolescent mystique."

== Release ==
"We were worried about Lord Love a Duck," said Axelrod before the film came out. "We were afraid it might give bad taste a bad name. But I think we're alright. If the picture comes off well I may get an Oscar. If it comes off very well I may get deported."

The film was a financial failure. "I can't imagine why it wasn't a hit," said Axelrod. "It got no reaction. I couldn't get anybody into the theaters to see it. It was one of those pictures that died. United Artists sold the shit out of it. I went on the road with it. I got reams of press. I ran what I thought was a clever ad campaign, parodying all the other campaigns."

== Awards ==
Lola Albright won the Silver Bear for Best Actress award at the 16th Berlin International Film Festival in 1966.

== See also ==
- List of American films of 1966
