= Russell Hunter (playwright) =

American writer, playwright, and composer

Russell Ellis Hunter
- Born: Russell Edwin Ellis; April 15, 1929; Illinois, United States
- Died: August 25, 1996 (aged 67); Denver, Colorado, USA
- Education: Northwestern University and Columbia University

Russell Ellis Hunter (April 15, 1929 – August 25, 1996) was an American writer, playwright, and composer based in Denver, Colorado. He was best known for writing the story for the movie The Changeling.
