= George Axelrod =

American dramatist (1922–2003)

- Born: June 9, 1922; New York City, U.S.
- Died: June 21, 2003 (aged 81); Los Angeles, California, U.S.
- Years active: 1954–1987
- Spouses: Gloria Washburn (m. 1942; div. 1954) Joan Stanton (m. 1954; died 2001)
- Children: 4; including Steven, Jonathan and Nina

George Axelrod (June 9, 1922 – June 21, 2003) was an American screenwriter and producer. His play The Seven Year Itch (1952), was adapted into a film of the same name starring Marilyn Monroe. Axelrod was nominated for an Academy Award for his 1961 adaptation of Truman Capote's Breakfast at Tiffany's and also adapted Richard Condon's The Manchurian Candidate (1962).

== Early life and family ==
Axelrod was born in New York City, the son of Beatrice Carpenter, a silent film actress, and Herman Axelrod, a Columbia graduate who had worked on the school's annual Varsity Show with Oscar Hammerstein and who later went into real estate. His father was Russian Jewish and his mother was of Scottish and English descent. He was the father of lawyer Peter Axelrod; Steven G. Axelrod, painting contractor and writer; Nina Axelrod, actress; and screenwriter Jonathan Axelrod (who married the actress Illeana Douglas). George Axelrod is the grandfather of actor Taliesin Jaffe.

== Career ==
=== Radio and Broadway ===
Early in his career, Axelrod worked in summer stock theater as a stage manager and an occasional actor. During World War II, he was a member of the U.S. Army Signal Corps. When he returned to civilian life, he wrote for The Shadow, Midnight, Grand Ole Opry, and other radio programs. With the advent of television, he wrote for that medium, too, eventually working on more than 400 TV and radio scripts. Comedians for whom he wrote included Jerry Lewis and Dean Martin Axelrod wrote the 1952 stage comedy, The Seven Year Itch, a risqué social satire about a middle-class man who has an affair while his wife and children are on vacation. The Seven Year Itch was first presented by Courtney Burr and Elliot Nugent at the Fulton Theatre, New York City, on July 15, 1952.

=== Television ===
Axelrod's overnight success prompted him to write a seriocomic teleplay, Confessions of a Nervous Man, starring Art Carney as a playwright waiting anxiously in a Theater District bar for the newspaper reviews of his first play to hit the streets. Based on his own experiences on the opening night of The Seven Year Itch, the one-hour play was presented as the November 30, 1953, episode of Studio One. He appeared on television himself occasionally as a guest panelist on What's My Line?

=== Films ===
The Broadway success of The Seven Year Itch led to the successful 1955 film directed by Billy Wilder and starring Marilyn Monroe. The plot was altered so that the husband (Tom Ewell) only fantasizes about having an affair.

Axelrod's next stage hit was Will Success Spoil Rock Hunter?, a Faustian comedy about a fan magazine writer (Orson Bean) selling his soul to the Devil (in the guise of a literary agent) to become a successful screenwriter. It ran for more than a year on Broadway in 1955–56 and received much attention in the national press thanks to its star, Jayne Mansfield. The screen rights were bought by 20th Century Fox, but the studio had director/screenwriter Frank Tashlin change the story to a satire on television advertising and throw out all of Axelrod's characters except Rita Marlowe (with Mansfield recreating her stage role). Axelrod was contemptuous of the 1957 film version, saying that he did not go to see it because the studio "never used my story, my play or my script."

In 1959–60, Lauren Bacall starred in his comic play Goodbye Charlie which ran for 109 performances, followed by a film version with Debbie Reynolds. During the late 1950s and early 1960s, Axelrod was one of the best paid screenwriters in Hollywood, and he was nominated for an Academy Award for his 1961 adaptation of Truman Capote's Breakfast at Tiffany's. He was highly regarded for his adaptation of Richard Condon's novel for director John Frankenheimer's Cold War thriller The Manchurian Candidate (1962) starring Laurence Harvey and Frank Sinatra. Axelrod, who co-produced, considered it his best screen adaptation. After the assassination of President John F. Kennedy in November 1963, the movie was taken out of circulation and wasn't re-released until 1988, when it became a box office hit and was deemed by critics to be a classic of American cinema.

Axelrod wrote the original screenplay for How to Murder Your Wife (1965), directed by Richard Quine with Jack Lemmon, Virna Lisi and Terry-Thomas. Axelrod directed Lord Love a Duck (1966), and two years later, he directed The Secret Life of an American Wife (1968). After a decade hiatus, he returned to films providing the screenplay for an unsuccessful remake of The Lady Vanishes (1979). Subsequent contributions include the scripts for Frankenheimer's The Holcroft Covenant (1985) and The Fourth Protocol (1987).

=== Novels ===
Axelrod published three novels: Blackmailer (1952), a darkly comic mystery; Beggar's Choice (1947), a comedy of role reversal; and Where Am I Now When I Need Me? (1971), a humorous overview of the Hollywood scene.

== Death ==
On June 21, 2003, at the age of 81, Axelrod died quietly at his Los Angeles home. He was under hospice care after a lingering illness. His body was cremated.

== Filmography ==
=== Film adaptations ===
- Phffft, directed by Mark Robson (1954, based on the play Phfft: Chronicle of a Happy Divorce)
- The Seven Year Itch, directed by Billy Wilder (1955, based on the play The Seven Year Itch)
- Will Success Spoil Rock Hunter?, directed by Frank Tashlin (1957, based on the play Will Success Spoil Rock Hunter?)
- Goodbye Charlie, directed by Vincente Minnelli (1964, based on the play Goodbye Charlie)

=== Screenwriter ===
- Phffft, directed by Mark Robson (1954)
- The Seven Year Itch, directed by Billy Wilder (1955)
- Bus Stop, directed by Joshua Logan (1956)
- Breakfast at Tiffany's, directed by Blake Edwards (1961)
- The Manchurian Candidate, directed by John Frankenheimer (1962)
- Paris When It Sizzles, directed by Richard Quine (1964)
- How to Murder Your Wife, directed by Richard Quine (1965)
- Lord Love a Duck, directed by George Axelrod (1966)
- The Secret Life of an American Wife, directed by George Axelrod (1968)
- The Lady Vanishes, directed by Anthony Page (1979)
- The Holcroft Covenant, directed by John Frankenheimer (1985) (co-written with Edward Anhalt and John Hopkins)
- The Fourth Protocol, directed by John Mackenzie (1987) (uncredited)
- The Manchurian Candidate, directed by Jonathan Demme (2004); remake of the 1962 film and adapted in part from Axelrod's script

=== Director ===
- Lord Love a Duck (1966)
- The Secret Life of an American Wife (1968)

=== Producer ===
- The Manchurian Candidate, directed by John Frankenheimer (1962)
- Paris When It Sizzles, directed by Richard Quine (1964)
- How to Murder Your Wife, directed by Richard Quine (1965)
- Lord Love a Duck, directed by George Axelrod (1966)
- The Secret Life of an American Wife, directed by George Axelrod (1968)
