= Peggy Clark =

Margaret Brownson Clark (1915 – June 19, 1996) was a lighting designer, costume designer, and set designer. She designed lighting for dance and opera, but she "is best known for her work on [stage] musicals".

== Biography ==
Peggy Clark graduated from Smith College with a B.A. in dramatic arts, and attended the Yale School of Fine Arts with a major in scenic design and lighting. She served as an assistant to many set designers, including John Koenig, Stewart Cheney, Donald Oenslager, Howard Bay, Nat Karson and Raoul Pene du Bois, as well as Oliver Smith. Smith gave her the opportunity to work on her own as a lighting designer on Beggar's Holiday (1946). She had started as a scenic designer in 1941 with the play Gabrielle.

She worked on some 78 Broadway productions, as a lighting designer and also occasionally as a set designer. She designed the lighting for musicals, such as Bells Are Ringing (1956) and Bye Bye Birdie (1960), revues, such as Along Fifth Avenue (1949), starring Nancy Walker and Jackie Gleason. which ran for 180 performances on Broadway, and plays, such as The Trip to Bountiful (1953), Goodbye Charlie (1959), and The Rose Tattoo (1966).

Her papers are in the Clark Collection at the Library of Congress.

She died on June 19, 1996.
