= Peggy Clarke (chess player) =

British chess player

- Born: Margaret Eileen Elizabeth Wood; 29 October 1937
- Died: 15 September 2018 (aged 80)
- Other name: Peggy Clarke-Wood
- Occupation: Chess Champion 1966
- Years active: 1966
- Spouse: Peter Clarke (m. 1962)
- Children: 3 daughters

Margaret Eileen Elizabeth Clarke (née Wood; 29 October 1937 – 15 September 2018) was joint British ladies' chess champion in 1966. She was the daughter of Baruch Harold Wood and married Peter Hugh Clarke in 1962. They had three daughters.
