= Yvonne Murray (singer) =

Canadian singer

- Born: Ireland
- Genre: Popular music
- Occupations: Singer, actress
- Instrument: Voice
- Labels: Cindril, MCG Records

Yvonne Murray is a Canadian singer who has had a hit in 1983 with "Don't Send Me Roses (Dear Abby)" which did well on two Canadian charts. She had another hit the following year with "Let's Not Waste Another Heartbeat". She has sung on multiple film soundtracks. She sang the title song "Never Far Apart" for the film, Melanie and has worked as an actress. She has worked with Paul Zaza on multiple projects. With Zaza she sang the theme to Kimba the White Lion (1993 Canadian Dub). She also did the voice for Kimba.

== Background ==
A regular on television, Murray has appeared in The 50s Connection, Music Til' Midnight and Sounds Good. Her 1983 debut single, "Don't Send Me Roses" and the album that followed brought her recognition throughout her country. She had another hit the following year with "Let's Not Waste Another Heartbeat". Born in Ireland and based in Toronto, she was managed by William J. Meloche. She recorded for MGC Records which was based at 70 Yorkville Road, Toronto, ON M5R 1B9, Canada.

== Music career 1970s to 1980s ==
=== Recordings ===
Murray recorded with the Longo Brothers and sang on the tracks "This Lonesome Road" and "Without You" which were released in 1979.

"Don't Send Me Roses (Dear Abby)"

On the week ending September 24, 1983, her song "Don't Send Me Roses (Dear Abby)" entered the RPM Contemporary Adult chart at #29. Her album, Yvonne Murray was out as well. Produced by Paul Zaza, the album also included the single's B side, "One Day at a Time" which was getting airplay in both the pop and country formats. Her self-titled album was reviewed in RPM Weekly in September 1983 (September 24 issue). According to the reviewer, the album was more pop than country, and the confidence that an artist would attain with stage and television experience was evident. Produced by Paul Zaza, with music by Ian McLean, the session musicians who played on the album were well experienced and impressive. The session musicians were backing singers, Cal Dodd, Stephanie Taylor and Judy Tate of the Laurie Bower Singers, Bob Lucier on steel guitar, Jon Anderson and Kevan McKey on drums, and Paul Zaza on keyboards. Her management company, the Meloche Communications Group had launched an aggressive campaign to promote the album, tying it in with the release of "Don't Send Me Roses (Dear Abby)".

For the week ending October 8, the single had entered the RPM Country 50 Singles chart at #50 and was at #24 on the RPM Contemporary Adult chart. The song peaked at #13 on the tenth week in the RPM Contemporary Adult chart on November 26. It also peaked at # 22 on its 8th week in the RPM Country Singles chart.

"Let's Not Waste Another Heartbeat"

In March, 1984, her single "Let's Not Waste Another Heartbeat" backed with a non-album track, "Baby It Hurts" was released. It was produced by Paul Zaza. The single was getting spun on Don Thatcher's show at CKAN, Newmarket, Toronto and Paul Kennedy's show at CHFX-FM in Halifax. By March 24, it had entered the RPM Contemporary Adult Chart at #30. Spending a total of eleven weeks in the chart, it peaked at #12 on June 2.

Other recordings

In 1984, the single, "Celebrate Our City" was released. It was a Toronto promotional and tribute record which attracted the attention of music broadcast programmers' clubs and event organizers.

=== Further activities ===
She was set to appear on the Tommy Hunter Show on October 21, 1983, singing a song from her album, "Let's Not Waste Another Heartbeat".

On January 13, 1984, she was guesting on CBC-TV's, The Tommy Hunter Show.

Murray and her band were scheduled to play the Toronto's Pier 4 and October's venues on April 9 to 28th and May 14 to June 2 respectively.

She added her backing vocals to Terry Carwford's Total Loss of Control album that was released in 1986.

== Music career 1990s to 2000s ==
She worked with Guido Luciani, adding vocal to his 1996 album, Azucar: The Magic of Spanish Guitar. She also was a backing vocalist on Wendy Lands' 1996 album, Angels & Ordinary Men. Along with Stephanie Taylor and Jackie Zaza, she sang backup on Kelly Walker's 24/42 album.

In 2021, the single "Outside Looking In (for The Endometriosis Network Canada)" was released. It was a collaboration between herself and Guido Luciani.

== Film work ==
In addition to singing the title song "Never Far Apart" for the 1982 film Melanie, she played the part of Brandy in the film.

She sang the song "Stop Foolin' Around" which was featured in the 1985 film, Breaking All the Rules. The song which was written by Paul Zaza was also recorded by Carol McCartney, with Zaza playing on the recording.

She performed the song "Burnin' Up Over You" for the 1990 film, Loose Cannons which starred Gene Hackman, Dan Aykroyd, and Dom DeLuise. Also that year, Prom Night III: The Last Kiss was released. She sang the song "The Last Kiss Will Be Mine" which was used in the film.

== Discography ==
Singles
Act	Release	Catalogue	Year	Notes
Yvonne Murray	"Never Far Apart" / "Give Me Back My Heart"	Cindril 803	1981	
Yvonne Murray	"Celebrate Our City" / "Celebrate Our City" (Instrumental Version)	MGC JM 83186	1983	
Yvonne Murray	"Don't Send Me Roses (Dear Abby)" / "One Day at a Time"	MGC JM8368	1983	
Yvonne Murray	"Let's Not Waste Another Heartbeat" / "Baby It Hurts"	MGC JM8409	1984	
Yvonne Murray	"Catch The Spirit" / "Catch the Spirit" (Instrumental)	MGC MCG0711	1984	

Album
Act	Release	Catalogue	Year	Notes
Yvonne Murray	Yvonne Murray	MGC JM-8367	1983	

== Filmography ==
Actress (film)
Film	Director	Role	Year	Notes
Melanie	Rex Bromfield	Brandy	1983	
Covert Action	Les Rose, J. Christian Ingvordsen	Lorraine	1987	

Actress (Television)
Film	Episode	Director	Role	Year	Notes
Kimba the White Lion (1993 Canadian Dub)		Fred Ladd	Voice of Kimba & Additional Voice	1993	

Soundtrack (film)
Film	Director	Song	Year	Notes
Melanie	Rex Bromfield	"Never Far Apart"	1982	Performer
Isaac Littlefeathers	Les Rose	"You Were So Good To Me"	1984	Performer
Breaking All the Rules	James Orr	"Stop Foolin' Around"	1985	Performer
One Magic Christmas	Phillip Borsos	"Stop! In the Name of Love"	1985	Performer
Prom Night III: The Last Kiss	Ron Oliver	"The Last Kiss Will Be Mine"	1989	Performer
Loose Cannons	Bob Clark	"Burnin' Up Over You"	1990	Writer
Popcorn	Mark Herrier	"Scary Scary Movies"	1991	Writer
Blown Away	Brenton Spencer	"Blown Away", "Hooked on You"	1993	Performer
Thick as Thieves	Scott Sanders	"Au Revoir Mun Coeur"	1999	Composer

Soundtrack (Television)
Film	Episode	Director	Song	Year	Notes
Kimba the White Lion (1993 Canadian Dub)		Fred Ladd	Introduction Theme	1993	With Paul Zaza
