= 4th Genie Awards =

1983 Canadian film awards

- Date: March 23, 1983
- Site: Royal Alexandra Theatre, Toronto, Ontario
- Hosted by: Dave Thomas

Highlights
- Best Picture: The Grey Fox
- Most awards: The Grey Fox (7)
- Most nominations: The Grey Fox (13)

The 4th annual Genie Awards were held March 23, 1983, at the Royal Alexandra Theatre in Toronto. The ceremony was hosted by comedian Dave Thomas.

The Grey Fox was the event's big winner, with seven awards including Best Picture. The film also topped the overall nomination count, with 13 nominations.

In the Best Screenplay Adapted from Another Medium category, the award to Richard Paluck and Robert Guza Jr. for Melanie was later rescinded, as the short story on which the screenplay was based had not been previously published. Another nominee, Latitude 55° by John Juliani and Sharon Riis, had already been disqualified for similar reasons, although the error had been discovered prior to the ceremony. It was decided not to award the trophy that year.

Nonetheless, that year's event was one of the most successful ever, with a sold-out theatre audience and a record 1.5 million Canadian television viewers.

== Nominees and winners ==
Motion Picture	Direction
The Grey Fox — Peter O'Brian; Harry Tracy, Desperado — Ronald I. Cohen; A Day in a Taxi (Une journée en taxi) — Robert Ménard; Quest for Fire — Denis Héroux and John Kemeny; Threshold — Jon Slan and Michael Burns	Phillip Borsos, The Grey Fox; Rex Bromfield, Melanie; Jean Pierre Lefebvre, Wild Flowers (Les fleurs sauvages); Robert Ménard, A Day in a Taxi (Une journée en taxi); Eric Till, If You Could See What I Hear
Actor in a leading role	Actress in a leading role
Donald Sutherland, Threshold; Gilles Renaud, A Day in a Taxi (Une journée en taxi); Saul Rubinek, By Design; Marcel Sabourin, Sweet Lies and Loving Oaths (Doux aveux); August Schellenberg, Latitude 55°	Rae Dawn Chong, Quest for Fire; Sara Botsford, By Design; Hélène Loiselle, Sweet Lies and Loving Oaths (Doux aveux); Monique Mercure, Beyond Forty (La Quarantaine); Andrée Pelletier, Latitude 55°
Actor in a supporting role	Actress in a supporting role
R.H. Thomson, If You Could See What I Hear; Nicholas Campbell, The Man in 5A; Doug McGrath, Porky's; Gary Reineke, The Grey Fox; Wayne Robson, The Grey Fox	Jackie Burroughs, The Grey Fox; Geneviève Brassard, Sweet Lies and Loving Oaths (Doux aveux); Clare Coulter, By Design; Patricia Nolin, Beyond Forty (La Quarantaine); Trudy Young, Melanie
Foreign Actor	Foreign Actress
Richard Farnsworth, The Grey Fox; Grand L. Bush, Hard Feelings; Bruce Dern, Harry Tracy, Desperado; Jeff Goldblum, Threshold; Ron Perlman, Quest for Fire; Jean Yanne, A Day in a Taxi (Une journée en taxi)	Glynnis O'Connor, Melanie; Patty Duke, By Design; Lee Grant, Visiting Hours; Marie-France Pisier, The Hot Touch; Mare Winningham, Threshold; Charlayne Woodard, Hard Feelings
Best Original Screenplay	Best Screenplay Adapted from Another Medium
John Hunter, The Grey Fox; Roger Fournier, A Day in a Taxi (Une journée en taxi); David Lee Henry, Harry Tracy, Desperado; John Juliani and Sharon Riis, Latitude 55°; Laurence Keane, Chris Windsor and Phil Savath, Big Meat Eater	Richard Paluck and Robert Guza Jr. - Melanie (rescinded); Peter Dion, The Hot Touch
Best Documentary	Best Theatrical Short
Robert Fortier, Adam Symansky and Bill Brind, The Devil at Your Heels; Michael McKennirey and John N. Smith, Gala; Hélène Verrier, The Great Chess Movie (Jouer sa vie)	Pierre Falardeau and Julien Poulin, Elvis Gratton; Scott Barrie, Footsteps; Michel Bouchard, The Toaster (Le Toasteur); David Fine and Ron Mann, The Only Game in Town
Art Direction/Production Design	Cinematography
Bill Brodie, The Grey Fox; Richard Hudolin, Latitude 55°; Anne Pritchard, Threshold	Michel Brault, Threshold; Pierre Mignot, A Day in a Taxi (Une journée en taxi)
Costume Design	Editing
John Hay, Quest for Fire; Huguette Gagné, Beyond Forty (La Quarantaine); Julie Ganton, Melanie; Wendy Partridge, Latitude 55°; Christopher Ryan, The Grey Fox	Yves Langlois, Quest for Fire; Frank Irvine, The Grey Fox; Susan Martin, Threshold; Ron Wisman, Harry Tracy, Desperado
Overall Sound	Sound Editing
Don White, Kenneth Heeley-Ray, Joe Grimaldi, Claude Hazanavicius and Austin Grimaldi, Quest for Fire; Joe Grimaldi, Rob Young and Austin Grimaldi, The Grey Fox; Rod Haykin, David Appleby and Don White, Harry Tracy, Desperado; Bryan Day, Paul Coombe, Allen Ormerod and Jack Heeren, Threshold; Serge Beauchemin, David Appleby, Terry Burke and Dino Pigat, A Day in a Taxi (Une journée en taxi)	Martin Ashbee, Kenneth Heeley-Ray, Kevin Ward and David Evans, Quest for Fire; Rod Crawley, Tony Currie, Peter Thilaye and Bruce Nyznik, The Grey Fox; Bruce Carwardine, Brian French, Glen Gauthier, Tim Roberts and Brian Rosen, Harry Tracy, Desperado; Wayne Griffin and Dennis Drummond, Melanie; Bruce Nyznik, Sharon Lackie and Tony Currie, Threshold
Achievement in Music: Original Score	Achievement in Music: Original Song
Michael Conway Baker, The Grey Fox; Maribeth Solomon and Micky Erbe, Threshold; Jonathan Goldsmith, Visiting Hours	Burton Cummings, "You Saved My Soul" (Melanie); Réjean Marois and Fernand Dansereau, "Doux aveux" (Sweet Lies and Loving Oaths (Doux aveux)); Leslie Pouliot, "My Love for You" (Harry Tracy, Desperado); Claude Fonfrède and Raoul Duguay, "Le quéteux d'amour" (Wild Flowers (Les fleurs sauvages)); Luc Plamondon and Germain Gauthier, "Call Girl" (Scandale); Fred Mollin, "Just One Chance to Be Free" (Spring Fever)
Special Awards	
Golden Reel Award: Porky's; Outstanding Contributions to the Canadian Film Industry: Findlay Quinn
