= Manny the Hippie =

Manny the Hippie (born Micah Papp in 1976) was a San Francisco Haight-Ashbury regular in 1996 when Late Show with David Letterman was being hosted from there, and David Letterman "discovered" him on the street. Letterman interviewed Manny on the air and subsequently made him a national celebrity.

He became a regular movie reviewer on the show and was renowned for his slang, like "schwag" for bad, "dank" for good, "diggity dank" for excellent, and "schwiggity schwag" for the worst.

David Letterman sent him scouring the streets of San Francisco on reportages and also dispatched him on newsbeats across the nation, for instance to Roswell.

However, he was wanted in Xenia, Ohio for pot smoking, and sentenced to spend eighteen months in jail in Ohio. At the last minute, Ohio authorities decided not to make arrangements for his return to Ohio, and he was instead granted bail in San Francisco in the amount of $5,000 and released to a crowd of fans. He thanked his attorney, Douglas L. Rappaport for his release, though he called him "John Rappaport."

On his last Late Show, Manny was given a stern and severe lecture by Letterman. While considering having him back on the show after his release, he said to Manny that if he ever got in trouble again, "I don't know you."

During his stay in prison, he had plans to write a book. Apparently those were thwarted by the need to constantly sign autographs for his fellow convicts and reply to fan mail. Released after ten months, he returned to San Francisco.

Based upon his TV show fame, he tried to launch a movie career, and in 1998 he played a bit part as "Vegan GooBall" in the movie Around the Fire.

Manny is still a minor celebrity in San Francisco, busking on the streets and attending various pot legalization rallies.
