= List of Danger Bay episodes =

This is an episode list for the television series Danger Bay.

== Series overview ==
Series	Episodes	Originally released	
Series	Episodes	First released	Last released
1	17	8 October 1984	28 January 1985
2	18	5 May 1986	1 September 1986
3	22	17 September 1986	2 February 1987
4	22	5 October 1987	29 February 1988
5	22	3 October 1988	27 February 1989
6	22	9 October 1989	5 March 1990

== Episodes ==
=== Season 1 (1984–85) ===
No. overall	No. in season	Title	Directed by	Written by	Original release date	Prod. code
1	1	"The Sea Pup"	Michael Berry & Gilbert Shilton	Peter L. Dixon & N.A. Cutcliff	8 October 1984	1-001
2	2	"Running Free"	Stuart Margolin	Story by : Peter L. Dixon; Teleplay by : John T. Dugan & Nancy Ann Miller	15 October 1984	1-006
3	3	"The Wharf Rat"	Allan Eastman	Don Balluck	22 October 1984	1-002
4	4	"Run Salmon Run"	Allan Eastman	Chris Haddock	29 October 1984	1-003
5	5	"The Contender"	Allan Eastman	Story by : Allan Magee & Alf Harris; Teleplay by : Alf Harris	5 November 1984	2-030
6	6	"Katie and the Whale"	Gilbert Shilton	Nancy Ann Miller	12 November 1984	1-013
7	7	"Flight of the Falcon"	Michael Berry	Rick Drew	19 November 1984	1-009
8	8	"Fish 'n' Chips"	Allan Eastman	Story by : Nancy Ann Miller & H.G. Berns; Teleplay by : H.G. Berns	26 November 1984	2-017
9	9	"Vet's Holiday"	Michael Berry	Andrew Nicholls & Darrell Vickers	3 December 1986	2-021
10	10	"Hot Cargo"	Gilbert Shilton	Chris Haddock	10 December 1984	1-005
11	11	"Grace Under Pressure"	Allan Eastman	John T. Dugan	17 December 1985	1-010
12	12	"Sunken Treasure"	Michael Berry	Story by : Marc Strange; Teleplay by : Rick Drew	24 December 1984	1-012
13	13	"The Only One"	Gilbert Shilton	John T. Dugan	31 December 1984	1-007
14	14	"Mad Hatter Bears"	Gilbert Shilton	Gilbert Shilton	7 January 1985	1-004
15	15	"Nature of the Beast"	Allan Eastman	Rick Drew	14 January 1985	1-008
16	16	"Timber"	Michael Berry	Story by : Joshua Miller; Teleplay by : Aubrey Solomon	21 January 1985	2-020
17	17	"The Mask"	Allan Eastman	Michael Mercer	28 January 1985	2-011

=== Season 2 (1986) ===
No. overall	No. in season	Title	Directed by	Written by	Original release date	Prod. code
18	1	"A New Beginning: Part 1"	Allan Eastman	John T. Dugan	May 5, 1986	2-014
19	2	"A New Beginning: Part 2"	Allan Eastman	John T. Dugan	May 12, 1986	2-015
20	3	"The Best of Intentions"	Michael Berry	David Eames	May 19, 1986	2-019
21	4	"White Water"	Michael Berry	Aubrey Solomon	May 26, 1986	2-025
22	5	"A Place for Ponga"	Allan King	Andrew Nicholls & Darrell Vickers	June 2, 1986	2-031
23	6	"Survival"	Michael Berry	Story by : Joshua Miller; Teleplay by : Aubrey Solomon	June 9, 1986	2-027
24	7	"Mayday! Mayday!"	Michael Berry	Roy Earle & Peter L. Dixon	June 16, 1986	2-018
25	8	"Leopard Spots"	Zale Dalen	Rick Drew	June 23, 1986	2-022
26	9	"Bathtub Race"	Michael Berry	Christian Bruyere	June 30, 1986	2-023
27	10	"Venom"	Stan Olsen	Barry Clark	July 7, 1986	2-016
28	11	"Trouble on the Range"	Stan Olsen	Aubrey Solomon	July 14, 1986	2-029
29	12	"Aquarius"	Zale Dalen	John T. Dugan	July 21, 1986	2-034
30	13	"Bengal Tiger"	Michael Berry	Story by : John Kingsbridge & Paul Saltzman; Teleplay by : Alf Harris	July 28, 1986	2-033
31	14	"Poison Bay"	Michael Berry	Michael Carmody & Gilbert Shilton	August 4, 1986	2-024
32	15	"King of Stanley Park"	Brad Turner	Rick Drew	August 11, 1986	2-028
33	16	"Deep Peril"	Stan Olsen	Barry Clark	August 18, 1986	2-032
34	17	"Fish Forgery"	Zale Dalen	Andrew Nicholls & Darrell Vickers	August 25, 1986	2-026
35	18	"Grand Theft Whale"	Stan Olsen	John T. Dugan	September 1, 1986	2-035

=== Season 3 (1986–87) ===
No. overall	No. in season	Title	Directed by	Written by	Original release date	Prod. code
36	1	"The Turning Tide"	Alan Simmonds	Suzette Couture	September 8, 1986	3-042
37	2	"Pressure Point"	Alan Simmonds	Peter White	September 15, 1986	3-045
38	3	"The Fish Who Walks"	Alan Simmonds	Anna Sandor	September 22, 1986	3-041
39	4	"Solo Flight"	Ken Jubenvill	Glenn Norman	September 29, 1986	3-044
40	5	"Lady Raven"	Alan Simmonds	Janet MacLean	October 6, 1986	3-049
41	6	"The Ultimate Gift"	Ken Jubenvill	Suzette Couture	October 13, 1986	3-043
42	7	"Thursday's Child"	Stan Olsen	Rick Drew	October 20, 1986	3-047
43	8	"The Vigilantes"	Alan Simmonds	Anthony Robertson	October 27, 1986	3-038
44	9	"The Lion Sleeps Tonight"	Tom Skerritt	Joe Wiesenfeld	November 3, 1986	3-037
45	10	"Million Dollar Whale Song"	Alan Simmonds	Janet MacLean	November 10, 1986	3-036
46	11	"Eye of the Storm"	Alan Simmonds	Keith Leckie	November 17, 1986	3-050
47	12	"Old Friends"	Ken Jubenvill	Bena Shuster	November 24, 1986	3-046
48	13	"Big Horns"	Ken Jubenvill	Story by : Peter Blow; Teleplay by : Glenn Norman	December 1, 1986	3-048
49	14	"Time Out"	Alan Simmonds	Jana Veverka	December 8, 1986	3-052
50	15	"All the King's Horses"	Don Shebib	Anna Sandor	December 15, 1986	3-056
51	16	"The Otters Return"	Brad Turner	Keith Leckie	December 22, 1986	3-039
52	17	"A Man of Few Words"	Alan Simmonds	Tim Carlson & Terrence McDonnell	December 29, 1986	3-054
53	18	"Signs of Growth"	Susan Martin	John Barker	January 5, 1987	3-053
54	19	"Rock Star"	Alan Simmonds	Janet MacLean	January 12, 1987	3-055
55	20	"S.S. Friendship"	Don Shebib	Suzette Couture	January 19, 1987	3-040
56	21	"Superfish"	Ken Jubenvill	Story by : Rick Drew; Teleplay by : Lionel E. Siegel	January 26, 1987	3-051
57	22	"Sylvan Shores"	John M. Eckert	Jana Veverka & Lionel E. Siegel	February 2, 1987	3-057

=== Season 4 (1987–88) ===
No. overall	No. in season	Title	Directed by	Written by	Original release date	Prod. code
58	1	"Melissa's Gift"	Allan Eastman	Suzette Couture	October 5, 1987; October 7, 1987 (Disney Channel)	4-065
59	2	"A Tangled Web"	Allan King	John Barker	October 12, 1987; October 14, 1987 (Disney Channel)	4-059
60	3	"Pets and Peeves"	Ken Jubenvill	Janet MacLean	October 19, 1987; October 21, 1987 (Disney Channel)	4-064
61	4	"Roots and Wings"	Allan King	Rick Drew	October 26, 1987	4-063
62	5	"The Dying Swan"	Alan Simmonds	Anna Sandor	November 2, 1987	4-068
63	6	"Protege"	Alan Simmonds	Linda F. Jones	November 9, 1987; November 11, 1987 (Disney Channel)	4-071
64	7	"High Flyer"	Ken Jubenvill	Janet MacLean	November 16, 1987; November 18, 1987 (Disney Channel)	4-072
65	8	"It's a Jungle in There"	Brad Turner	Paul Ledoux	November 23, 1987	4-062
66	9	"Castaways"	Ken Jubenvill	Keith Leckie	November 30, 1987	4-066
67	10	"Love Game"	Brad Turner	Anna Sandor	December 7, 1987; December 9, 1987 (Disney Channel)	4-069
68	11	"Deep Trouble"	Allan King	Story by : Pauline R. Heaton & Vaughan Raymond; Teleplay by : Rick Drew	December 14, 1987	4-076
69	12	"The Smiling Dolphin"	Neill Fearnley	Keith Leckie	December 21, 1987	4-067
70	13	"Pilot Error"	Allan Eastman	Michael Mercer	December 28, 1987; December 30, 1987 (Disney Channel)	4-060
71	14	"Hand to Hand"	Rex Bromfield	Story by : Tom Braidwood; Teleplay by : Michael Mercer	January 4, 1988; January 6, 1988 (Disney Channel)	4-078
72	15	"Jan"	Don Owen	Suzette Couture	January 11, 1988	4-075
73	16	"The Only Way Down Is Up"	Allan King	Pete White	January 18, 1988	4-061
74	17	"Covert Operation"	Ken Girotti	Marc Strange	January 25, 1988	4-074
75	18	"Second Best"	Brad Turner	Story by : Janet MacLean; Teleplay by : Julie Lacey	February 1, 1988	4-077
76	19	"Eagles Fly Alone"	Ken Jubenvill	Michael Mercer	February 8, 1988	4-073
77	20	"To Glimpse a Unicorn"	Alan Simmonds	Pete White	February 15, 1988	4-058
78	21	"A Man's Sport"	Ken Jubenvill	Story by : Bruce Martin; Teleplay by : Bruce Martin & Michael Mercer	February 22, 1988	4-070
79	22	"Put a Little Back"	Brad Turner	Story by : Jana Veverka; Teleplay by : Keith Leckie	February 29, 1988	4-079

=== Season 5 (1988–89) ===
No. overall	No. in season	Title	Directed by	Written by	Original release date	Prod. code
80	1	"Stormy Weather"	Allan King	Janet MacLean	October 3, 1988	5-080
81	2	"Something New"	Allan King	Janet MacLean	October 10, 1988	5-081
82	3	"The Birdman"	Alan Simmonds	Rick Drew	October 17, 1988	5-082
83	4	"Second Honeymoon"	Allan King	Suzette Couture	October 24, 1988	5-083
84	5	"Harry's Ark"	Ken Jubenvill	Suzette Couture	October 31, 1988	5-084
85	6	"Blues for Adam"	Alan Simmonds	Charles Lazer	November 7, 1988	5-085
86	7	"Expert Witness"	Brad Turner	Pete White	November 14, 1988	5-086
87	8	"After Dark"	Rex Bromfield	Larry Gaynor	November 21, 1988	5-087
88	9	"Skywatch"	Ken Jubenvill	Glenn Norman	November 28, 1988	5-088
89	10	"Fire Jumper"	Ken Jubenvill	Keith Leckie	December 5, 1988	5-089
90	11	"The Rally"	Allan King	Lyle Slack	December 12, 1988	5-090
91	12	"The Return of Sugar Ray"	Alan Simmonds	Stephen Dewar	December 19, 1988	5-091
92	13	"Racing Against Time"	Brad Turner	David Eames	December 26, 1988	5-092
93	14	"Chanda"	Jim Kaufman	Larry Gaynor	January 2, 1989	5-093
94	15	"Where the Buck Stops"	Ken Jubenvill	Aubrey Solomon	January 9, 1989	5-094
95	16	"Shaughnessy Island"	Deepa Saltzman	Suzette Couture	January 16, 1989	5-095
96	17	"Open Book"	Brad Turner	Jim Purdy	January 23, 1989	5-096
97	18	"Up the Coast"	Rex Bromfield	Charles Lazer	January 30, 1989	5-097
98	19	"One Black Dog"	Michael Robinson	Larry Gaynor	February 6, 1989	5-098
99	20	"Before the Mast"	Brad Turner	Brian Kit McLeod	February 13, 1989	5-099
100	21	"Murder at the Aquarium"	Rex Bromfield	Jeri Craden	February 20, 1989	5–100
101	22	"Catch a Falling Star"	Alan Simmonds	Glenn Norman	February 27, 1989	5–101

=== Season 6 (1989–90) ===
No. overall	No. in season	Title	Directed by	Written by	Original release date	Prod. code
102	1	"Talk Show"	Brad Turner	Larry Gaynor	9 October 1989	6–102
103	2	"A Question of Attitude"	Alan Simmonds	Story by : Tim Henry; Teleplay by : Keith Leckie	16 October 1989	6–103
104	3	"Legacy"	Alan Simmonds	Ken Gass	23 October 1989	6–104
105	4	"Voices From the Deep"	Allan Eastman	Aubrey Solomon	30 October 1989	6–105
106	5	"Getting to Know You"	Allan King	Suzette Couture	6 November 1989	6–106
107	6	"High Ice"	Allan King	Michael Mercer	13 November 1989	6–107
108	7	"Trouble is My Middle Name"	Allan King	Suzette Couture	20 November 1989	6–108
109	8	"Small Fry"	Ken Jubenvill	Story by : Bruce Martin; Teleplay by : Aubrey Solomon	27 November 1989	6–109
110	9	"Value Judgement"	Allan Eastman	Aubrey Solomon	4 December 1989	6–110
111	10	"Wolf on Trial"	Alan Simmonds	Keith Leckie	11 December 1989	6–111
112	11	"This Little Piggy"	Deepa Mehta	Suzette Couture	18 December 1989	6–112
113	12	"The Emperor's New Clothes"	Ken Jubenvill	Charles Lazer	25 December 1989	6–113
114	13	"Lifeline"	Ken Jubenvill	Jeffrey Cohen	1 January 1990	6–114
115	14	"Hijacked"	Deepa Mehta	Glenn Norman	8 January 1990	6–115
116	15	"Flying Blind"	Allan King	Ann MacNaughton	15 January 1990	6–116
117	16	"Ancient Spirits"	Deepa Mehta	Michael Mercer	22 January 1990	6–117
118	17	"Listening In"	Ken Jubenvill	Jeffrey Cohen	29 January 1990	6–118
119	18	"Kelsey's Eyes"	Nicholas Kendall	Suzette Couture	5 February 1990	6–119
120	19	"Live Wires"	Sheldon Larry	Phil Savath	12 February 1990	6–120
121	20	"Lost Causes"	Alan Simmonds	Michael Mercer	19 February 1990	6–121
122	21	"Three's a Crowd"	Nicholas Kendall	Story by : Bruce Martin; Teleplay by : Michael Mercer	26 February 1990	6–122
123	22	"Looking Back"	Allan King	Sondra Kelly	5 March 1990	6–123
