= Home Is Where the Hart Is =

- Directed by: Rex Bromfield
- Written by: Rex Bromfield
- Produced by: John M. Eckert
- Starring: Valri Bromfield; Leslie Nielsen; Martin Mull; Eric Christmas; Ted Stidder; Stephen E. Miller; Deanne Henry; Joe Austin
- Cinematography: Robert Ennis
- Edited by: Michael Todd
- Music by: Eric Robertson
- Distributed by: Atlantic Releasing Corporation
- Release date: 4 December 1987
- Running time: 94 min.
- Country: Canada
- Language: English

Home Is Where the Hart Is is a 1987 Canadian screwball comedy film, written and directed by Rex Bromfield. It stars Valri Bromfield, Leslie Nielsen, Eric Christmas, Ted Stidder and Martin Mull.

== Plot summary ==
A cunning nurse and con artist Belle Haimes (Valri Bromfield) lives with her simpleton of a husband Rex Haimes (Stephen E. Miller) in the Hart Mansion in British Columbia. There she takes care of the invalid, 103-year-old Slim Hart, called "Pappy", (Joe Austin) and his wife, Minnie (Enid Saunders) who has been in a coma for some time. Waking up one day, nurse Belle doesn't feel very prone to go back to her dead end job nursing the old couple. She accidentally overhears the night nurse working at the same mansion (Leslie Jones) reading a postcard from the old couple's two twin boys, Martin Hart (Eric Christmas) and Art Hart (Ted Stidder). The postcard tells that the boys will be returning home to their Pappy soon. With that information in mind, Belle starts planning the demise of the old, comatose Mrs. Hart and the kidnapping of Old Pappy, but things don't go quite according to plan.

== Cast ==
Belle Haimes - Valri Bromfield
Rex Haimes - Stephen E. Miller
Selma Dodge - Deanne Henry
Carson Boundy - Martin Mull
Martin Hart - Eric Christmas
Art Hart - Ted Stidder
Sheriff Nashville Schwartz - Leslie Nielsen
Slim Hart - Joe Austin
Minnie Hart - Enid Saunders
Night Nurse - Leslie Jones
2nd Blind Man - Dana Still
Wanda Fuch - Jeni Le Gon
Minister at Funeral - Jackson Davies
Gravedigger - Hagan Beggs
Chester Nimms - Marc Bourrel
Nun - Joe Sala
Cafe Customer - Marc Acheson
Deputy Worse - Adrien Dorval
Millie - Jeannette Lewis
Punk Kid - Ian Tracey
Justice of the Peace - Simon Webb
J.P.'s Wife - Janet Wright
