= Paul Zaza =

Canadian composer (born 1952)

- Born: September 1, 1952 (age 74); Vancouver, British Columbia, Canada
- Occupation: Songwriter

Paul Zaza (born September 1, 1952) is a Canadian Genie Award-winning film score and songwriter who worked frequently with director Bob Clark and with fellow composer Carl Zittrer. He has composed scores for more than 100 films.

== Early life and education ==
Originally from Toronto, Zaza trained as a classical pianist, graduating from the Royal Conservatory of Music.

== Career ==
In 1980, Zaza won the Genie Award for Best Music Score alongside Carl Zittrer for their work on Murder by Decree. That year the pair teamed up again to write the score for the film Prom Night.

In 1981, Zaza composed the score for the slasher film My Bloody Valentine; in 1983, he once more collaborated with Zittrer to write the score for the well-known film A Christmas Story, which was released as an album much later in 2009.

He was nominated for the same award in 1985 for Isaac Littlefeathers. In 1987, he received a Genie nomination for Best Original Song alongside Peter Simpson for the film Bullies. In contrast, in 1986 he was nominated for the Razzie Award for Worst Musical Score for the film Turk 182. He also composed the theme music for Mr. Wizard's World.

Zaza wrote the new television theme song and composed an all-new soundtrack for the 1993 Canadian English dub of Osamu Tezuka's anime, Kimba the White Lion in Toronto, originally released in 1965 in Japan.

=== Work with The Longo Brothers ===
In 1978, the Longo Brothers had a single " Sun Side Up" bw "Looking For Love" released on People City Music PCM 123. Zaza produced the single. He was also the arranger on their single, "Manhattan" bw "Nightwalk".

With Frank Longo and Larry Longo, he played on the Parry Music Library releases Orchestral Drama 2 PML 141, Country Moods PML 144 and High Style PML 147 albums.

The Longo Brothers had a single "City Motions" (Featuring Moe Koffman) in the CanCon Top 10 Adult Contemporary chart for a number of weeks in 1984.

=== Work with Yvonne Murray ===
Zaza produced her single, "Don't Send Me Roses (Dear Abby)" and album. The single did quite well. For the week ending October 8, the single had entered the RPM Country 50 Singles chart at No. 50 and was at No. 24 on the RPM Contemporary Adult chart. The song peaked at No. 13 on the tenth week in the RPM Contemporary Adult chart on November 26. It also peaked on that date at No. 22 on its 8th week in the RPM Country Singles chart. He produced her next single, "Let's Not Waste Another Heartbeat" at his Toronto studio. The song spent a total of eleven weeks in the chart, it peaked at No. 12 on June 2.

== Selected filmography ==
- The Lodger: A Story of the London Fog (1927) – 1997 score for home video release
- Three Card Monte (1978)
- Murder by Decree (1979)
- Stone Cold Dead (1979)
- Title Shot (1979)
- Prom Night (1980)
- The Kidnapping of the President (1980)
- Ghostkeeper (1981)
- My Bloody Valentine (1981)
- Gas (1981)
- Porky's (1981)
- Melanie (1982)
- Curtains (1983)
- American Nightmare (1983)
- A Christmas Story (1983)
- Turk 182 (1985)
- Breaking All the Rules (1985)
- The Vindicator (1986)
- Bullies (1986)
- Meatballs III: Summer Job (1986)
- The Pink Chiquitas (1987)
- From the Hip (1987)
- Hello Mary Lou: Prom Night II (1987)
- Blindside (1987)
- The Brain (1988)
- Norman's Awesome Experience (1989)
- Mob Story (1989)
- Loose Cannons (1990)
- Prom Night III: The Last Kiss (1990)
- Flesh Gordon Meets the Cosmic Cheerleaders (1990)
- Popcorn (1991)
- To Catch a Killer (1992)
- Prom Night IV: Deliver Us from Evil (1991)
- Blown Away (1992)
- Liar's Edge (1992)
- Cold Sweat (1993)
- It Runs in the Family (1994)
- Iron Eagle IV (1995)
- Baby Geniuses (1999)
- In Her Defense (1999)
- Grizzly Falls (1999)
- The Fourth Angel (2001)
- Now & Forever (2002)

== See also ==
- List of Canadian composers
