= Richard Paluck =

Canadian Screenwriter

Richard Paluck is a former Canadian screenwriter, most noted as co-writer with Robert Guza Jr. of the 1982 film Melanie. The duo were originally named the winners of the Genie Award for Best Adapted Screenplay at the 4th Genie Awards in 1983; however, the award was subsequently rescinded after the Academy of Canadian Cinema and Television learned that the short story from which it was adapted had not been previously published, making it ineligible for the award according to the academy's rules at that time.

Paluck was later a writer for the television series Max Glick.
