= Let's Not Waste Another Heartbeat =

Song by Yvonne Murray

from the album Yvonne Murray
- A-side: "Let's Not Waste Another Heartbeat"
- B-side: "Baby It Hurts"
- Released: 1984
- Length: 3:12
- Label: MCG JM8368
- Composers: J. Ian McLean, Paul James Zaza
- Producer: Paul Zaza

Yvonne Murray singles chronology
"Don't Send Me Roses (Dear Abby)" (1983)	"Let's Not Waste Another Heartbeat" (1984)	"Catch the Spirit" (1984)

"Let's Not Waste Another Heartbeat" was the second hit single for Yvonne Murray. It was the follow-up to her previous hit single in 1983, "Don't Send Me Roses (Dear Abby)".

== Background ==
Following Yvonne Murray's success in 1983 with "Don't Send Me Roses (Dear Abby)", "Let's Not Waste Another Heartbeat" was released in 1984. It was taken from her album, Yvonne Murray which was released on MGC Records JM8367.

The song was performed on the CBC, country music show, Tommy Hunter Show on October 21, 1983. In March, 1984, her single backed with a non-album track written by Doug Wass, "Baby It Hurts" was released on MGC JM8409. It was produced by Paul Zaza at his own studio in Toronto.

The March 10 issue of RPM Weekly showed that the single was getting spins on Don Thatcher's show at CKAN, Newmarket, Toronto and Paul Kennedy's show at CHFX-FM in Halifax.

== Charts ==
In March 1984, "Let's Not Waste Another Heartbeat debuted on the RPM Contemporary Adult Chart at number 30. It peaked at number 12 on June 2 during an 11-week chart run.
