= Sweet Lies and Loving Oaths =

- French: Doux aveux
- Directed by: Fernand Dansereau
- Written by: Fernand Dansereau; Bernard Dansereau; Florence Bolté; Dominique Lévesque
- Produced by: Gaston Cousineau
- Starring: Marcel Sabourin; Genevieve Brassard; Hélène Loiselle; Gilbert Turp
- Cinematography: Alain Dupras
- Edited by: José Heppell
- Release date: September 6, 1982
- Running time: 85 minutes
- Country: Canada
- Language: French

Sweet Lies and Loving Oaths (French: Doux aveux) is a 1982 Canadian drama film, directed by Fernand Dansereau.

A study of the generation gap, the film centres on Rose-Alma (Hélène Loiselle), a grandmother who wants to reestablish her independence after living with her daughter. With the assistance of her granddaughter Odile (Geneviève Brassard), she moves back out to her own apartment and commences a new relationship with Clovis (Marcel Sabourin), her new landlord.

The film garnered four Genie Award nominations at the 4th Genie Awards in 1983, for Best Actor (Sabourin), Best Actress (Loiselle), Best Supporting Actress (Brassard) and Best Original Song ("Doux aveux", by Dansereau and Réjean Marois.)
