= Jack Mullaney =

American actor (1929–1982)

- Born: September 18, 1929; Pittsburgh, Pennsylvania, U.S.
- Died: June 27, 1982 (aged 52); Los Angeles, California, U.S.
- Occupation: Actor
- Years active: 1954–1980

Jack Mullaney (September 18, 1929 – June 27, 1982) was an American actor. He appeared on Broadway in The Remarkable Mr. Pennypacker from 1953 to 1954. Mullaney acted in several television series and films throughout his career.

== Early life ==
He was born in Pittsburgh, Pennsylvania. The 1940 United States census shows Jack Mullaney living on Minot Avenue in the Oakley neighborhood of Cincinnati, Ohio.

== Career ==
Mullaney made his film debut in The Young Stranger in 1957. That same year he appeared as Ensign Lewis in the comedy Kiss Them for Me, starring Cary Grant.

He appeared regularly as Johnny Wallace, a bellhop, in CBS's The Ann Sothern Show (1958–1961). He also portrayed United States Navy Lieutenant (junior grade) Rex St. John in NBC's Ensign O'Toole (1962–1963). He played Hector Canfield on the CBS science-fiction comedy TV series It's About Time (1966-1967).

In the 1958 film South Pacific, based on the Rodgers and Hammerstein hit musical, he played a character affectionately known as the "Professor." He appeared as murderer Bert Rockwood on episode #227 of Lee Marvin's M Squad, titled "The Vanishing Lady," which first aired April 3, 1959, and also had a small, but important, role in the 1964 political thriller Seven Days in May. He worked in two Elvis Presley features late in the rock singer's film career, 1965's Tickle Me and Spinout in 1966. He played the bungling minion Igor to Vincent Price's eponymous mad scientist in Dr. Goldfoot and the Bikini Machine.

== Death ==
Mullaney's death, from a stroke, occurred in Hollywood, June 27, 1982, at age 52. His sister was the heir to his estate.

== Television appearances ==
- Men of Annapolis, syndicated series, in two episodes as Styron
- The Ann Sothern Show
- Ensign O'Toole with Dean Jones
- My Living Doll with Bob Cummings and Julie Newmar
- The Many Loves of Dobie Gillis
- It's About Time
- Alfred Hitchcock Presents
  - Season 1 Episode 30: "Never Again" as Mr. Marlow (1956)
  - Season 1 Episode 33: "The Belfry" as Clint Ringle (1956)
  - Season 1 Episode 37: "The Decoy" as Dave Packard (1956)
  - Season 2 Episode 38: "A Little Sleep" as Diner Customer (1957)
- George directed by Marshall Thompson
- The Barbara Stanwyck Show as Jed Krieger in "House in Order" (1960)
- The Law and Mr. Jones, episode "The Concert", (March 10, 1961)
- The DuPont Show with June Allyson as Jerry in "Love on Credit" (1960) and Philip Roberts in "Our Man in Rome" (1961)
- The Phil Silvers Show (1956, season one), "War Games," as new recruit/radio operator (uncredited)
- That Girl, episode 18, "Many Happy Returns," as IRS auditor Leon Cobb

== Filmography ==
- The Young Stranger (1957) - Confused Boy
- The Vintage (1957) - Etienne
- Kiss Them for Me (1957) - Ensign Albert Lewis
- South Pacific (1958) - The Professor
- All the Fine Young Cannibals (1960) - Putney Tinker
- The Absent-Minded Professor (1961) - Air Force Captain
- The Honeymoon Machine (1961) - Lieutenant Beauregard 'Beau' Gilliam
- Seven Days in May (1964) - Lieutenant (junior grade) Dorsey Grayson (uncredited)
- Tickle Me (1965) - Stanley Potter
- Dr. Goldfoot and the Bikini Machine (1965) - Igor
- Spinout (1966) - Curly
- Little Big Man (1970) - Card Player with Full House
- Love Hate Love (1972) - Mr. Leffingwell's Male Secretary
- George! (1972) - Walter
- When the Legends Die (1972) - Gas Station Attendant
- Little Miss Marker (1980) - Casino Pit Boss (final film role)
