= Touched By Evil =

1997 American made-for-television film

- Written by: Phil Penningroth
- Directed by: James A. Contner
- Starring: Paula Abdul; Adrian Pasdar; Susan Ruttan
- Music by: Dan Slider
- Country of origin: United States
- Original language: English

Production
- Producer: Harry R. Sherman
- Cinematography: Robert Primes
- Editor: Thomas Fries
- Running time: 96 minutes
- Production companies: Media Arts Management; Vin Di Bona Productions

Original release
- Network: ABC
- Release: January 12, 1997

Touched By Evil is a 1997 television drama film directed by James A. Contner and starring Paula Abdul, Adrian Pasdar and Susan Ruttan. It aired on ABC on January 12, 1997, at 9:00 p.m. in the Eastern and Pacific time zones and 8:00 p.m. in the Central and Mountain time zones. The film marks the acting debut of American singer/choreographer Abdul as a main character.

== Plot ==
Ellen Collier (Paula Abdul), a well-put-together businesswoman, finds comfort and security in her relationship with her loving and supporting new boyfriend, auto detailer Jerry Braskin (Adrian Pasdar), after being savagely attacked by a serial rapist. But other rapes occur just when Ellen thought it was safe for her to slowly break free from her self-imposed shell, which eventually causes her to believe that Jerry is hiding a very dark secret. Eventually, Ellen is confronted with rock-solid evidence that her boyfriend Jerry is the very same man who raped her and she has to save herself before it's too late.

== Cast ==
- Paula Abdul as Ellen Collier
- Adrian Pasdar as Jerry Braskin
- Susan Ruttan as Madge Jaynes
- Charlayne Woodard as Detective Duvall
- Tracy Nelson as Clara Devlin
- Dale Wilson as Ronald Myers
