= Valri Bromfield =

Canadian former comedian, actor, writer, and television producer

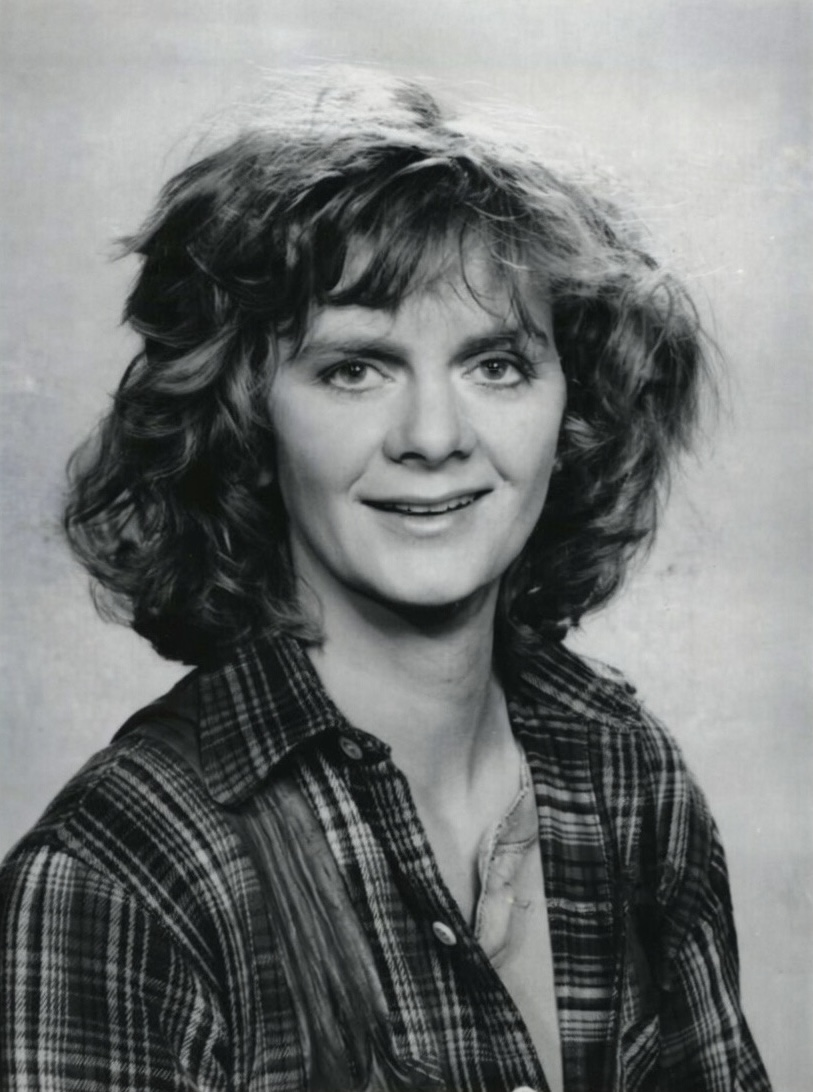
- Bromfield in 1981
- Born: Toronto, Ontario, Canada
- Occupations: Comedian, actress, television producer
- Years active: 1978–2001
- Relatives: Lois Bromfield (sister); Rex Bromfield (brother)

Valri Bromfield is a Canadian former comedian, actress, writer, and television producer who started her career as one half of a comedy team with Dan Aykroyd. Together, they joined the first Toronto company of The Second City where she was one of the original players.

== Career ==
She formed a comedy team with Dan Aykroyd. Bromfield was a regular performer on the 1974 The Bobbie Gentry Show. She performed comedy on the first episode of Saturday Night Live on October 11, 1975. Between dress rehearsal and the live airing, Lorne Michaels told her she had to cut her monologue from five minutes to two.

She also appeared on another SNL episode in 1978. In 1979 she played Mary Mary on the ABC series Angie. In 1980, she played Debbie Smith on The David Letterman Show. She played Laney Gibbs in Best of the West in 1981, and appeared on six episodes of SCTV between 1983 and 1984. In 1984, she appeared on nine episodes of The New Show, another NBC sketch comedy show produced by Saturday Night Live creator Lorne Michaels.

In 1993, she appeared as herself on Friends of Gilda. Bromfield appeared on nineteen episodes of Grace Under Fire as Faith Burdette between 1993 and 1995. In 1995, she appeared on Joe Bob's Drive-In Theater.

Bromfield appeared on the CBC's 90 Minutes Live and the BCTV show Zig Zag, both in her native Canada.

== Film appearances ==
Her film credits include Doris in Mr. Mom, Belle Haimes in Home Is Where the Hart Is (in a rare leading role), Detective Casey in Who's Harry Crumb?, Miss Purdah in Nothing but Trouble, Brandy in Caged Fear, Dawny in This Is My Life, and Wilma Jerzyck in Needful Things.

== Voice acting ==
As a voice actor, she made her animation debut in the 1974 television movie The Gift of Winter. A Halloween-themed sequel was released four years later titled Witch's Night Out. Bromfield voiced Honey Bunny Funnybunny on an ABC Weekend Special in 1994 based on the works of Marilyn Sadler. She also voiced Nurse Molly on Camp Candy and has done voice acting in animated shows such as Popples, Tiny Toon Adventures, Animaniacs and Superman: The Animated Series, among others.

== Other credits ==
Bromfield has worked behind the scenes in a creative capacity on numerous TV series. From 1986 to 1990, she was a creative consultant on Head of the Class. During the 1990–91 season, she served as a co-producer on Going Places. She was also a supervising producer on The Kids in the Hall. Bromfield has been credited as a writer on a number of shows in which she has appeared and other television shows such as That Thing (1978) and Space Cases (1996).

== Filmography ==
Year	Title	Role	Notes
1974	The Gift of Winter	Tender, Secretary of Cold, Guard (voice)	
1990–1992	Tiny Toon Adventures	Lady Di, Mary Hartless, Fran (voice)	3 episodes
1993	Animaniacs	Mary Hartless, Queen (voice)	3 episodes
1996	Superman: The Animated Series	Big Susan (voice)	Episode: "My Girl"

== Personal life ==
Her sister Lois Bromfield is also a comedic actor, writer, and producer. Her brother Rex Bromfield is a writer and retired film director.
