= Ensign O'Toole =

- Genre: Sitcom
- Directed by: Hy Averback; Richard Kinon; Lawrence Dobkin; Don Taylor; James Komack; Jackie Cooper; Bob Claver; Jeffrey Hayden
- Starring: Dean Jones; Jay C. Flippen; Jack Mullaney; Jack Albertson; Harvey Lembeck; Beau Bridges; Bob Sorrells
- Country of origin: United States
- Original language: English
- No. of seasons: 1
- No. of episodes: 32

Production
- Producers: Hy Averback; Bob Claver
- Running time: 22–24 minutes
- Production company: Four Star Television-Lederer

Original release
- Network: NBC
- Release: September 23, 1962 – May 5, 1963

Dean Jones in Ensign O'Toole.

Ensign O'Toole is an American sitcom that stars Dean Jones in the title role as an officer aboard the United States Navy destroyer USS Appleby in the early 1960s. It aired from 1962 to 1963.

== Plot ==
Ensign O'Toole is a junior officer aboard the fictional destroyer USS Appleby in the peacetime United States Navy of the early 1960s. Also aboard the Appleby are the ship's executive officer, Lieutenant Commander Virgil Stoner; its supply officer, the rich and usually befuddled Lieutenant (junior grade) Rex St. John; and an assortment of zany crewmen, including Chief Petty Officer Homer Nelson — who always seems to be in search of a poker game and often butts heads with O'Toole — and Seamen Gabby Di Julio, Howard Spicer, and Claude White. The nonchalant O'Toole is clever, speaks several languages, can answer any trivia question, and expresses expertise in almost any subject that comes up, but avoids doing work, preferring to spend his time pulling pranks and showing up the ambitious and overbearing St. John, usually with the enthusiastic help of the crew. The Appleby′s commanding officer never appears on camera; usually Lieutenant Commander Stoner relays his orders to the crew, although sometimes the commanding officer's voice is heard over the ship's "squawk box."

== Cast ==
- Dean Jones as Ensign O'Toole
- Jay C. Flippen as Chief Petty Officer Homer Nelson
- Jack Mullaney as Lieutenant (junior grade) Rex St. John
- Jack Albertson as Lieutenant Commander Virgil Stoner
- Harvey Lembeck as Seaman Gabby Di Julio
- Beau Bridges as Seaman Howard Spicer
- Bob Sorrells as Seaman Claude White
- Stuart Margolin as Lieutenant Miller (recurring)
- Skip Ward as Lieutenant Ferguson (recurring)
- Ken Berry as Lieutenant Melton (recurring)
- Gerald Trump as Crump (recurring)
- Andrew Colmar as Naismith (recurring)
- Eddie Peterson as Selby (recurring)

== Production ==
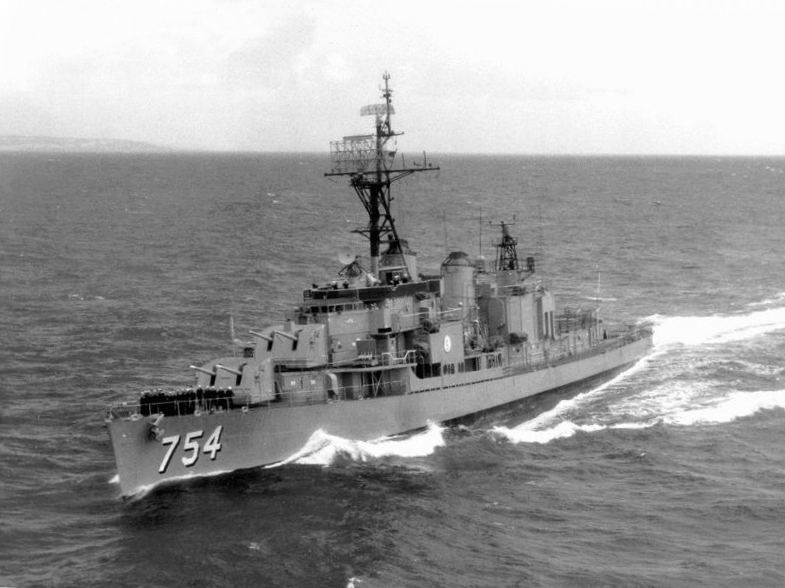
The destroyer USS Frank E. Evans (DD-754), seen in April 1963, portrayed the fictional USS Appleby.

Ensign O'Toole was based on two books — All the Ships at Sea (1950) and Ensign O'Toole and Me (1957) — by William Lederer, who served as consultant for the series. The destroyer USS Frank E. Evans (DD-754) portrayed the fictional USS Appleby.

== Broadcast history ==
Ensign O'Toole premiered on NBC on September 23, 1962. It lasted a single season, and the last of its 32 original episodes aired on May 5, 1963. Prime-time reruns of Ensign O'Toole followed in its regular time slot on NBC until September 15, 1963. The show aired at 7:00 p.m. on Sunday throughout its run.

From March to September 1964, ABC ran prime-time reruns of Ensign O'Toole at 9:00 p.m. on Thursday. The last of these aired on September 10, 1964, before Bewitched took its time slot the following week.

From April 2023, the series was shown in the United Kingdom on Talking Pictures TV.

== Episodes ==
No.	Title	Directed by	Written by	Original release date
1	"Operation: Kowana"	Hy Averback	Bill Davenport	September 23, 1962
The Appleby′s crew receives a stern warning to be on its best behavior while on shore leave in the Japanese port of Kowana, because the last U.S. Navy crew that visited Kowana flooded the town with play money. Complications ensue when a native of the town believes that he won the Appleby in a poker game. Guest stars: Victor Sen Yung and Mako.
2	"Operation: Model T"	Hy Averback	Jim Fritzell and Everett Greenbaum	September 30, 1962
After Lieutenant (junior grade) St. John accidentally ruins a French doctor's Ford Model T while attempting to repair it on a South Pacific island in French Polynesia, O'Toole purchases the car and has the crew camouflage it in pieces aboard the Appleby. After the Appleby reaches port in California, he has the car reassembled so he can sell it — but before the buyer he lined up can arrive, an admiral who is an antique car collector sees it on the dock. Guest star: Don Beddoe, Susan Silo, Emil Genest, and Alberto Morin.
3	"Operation: Daddy"	Hy Averback	James Allardice and Tom Adair	October 7, 1962
Seaman White's wife is about to give birth in Omaha, Nebraska, while he is stuck aboard the Appleby in San Diego, California — but with Lieutenant Commander Stoner ashore and unable to interfere, O'Toole is sure he can have leave papers issued for White immediately. Guest stars: Molly Dodd, Merle Pertile, and Davis Roberts.
4	"Operation: Benefit"	Hy Averback	Sheldon Keller and Howard Merrill	October 14, 1962
O'Toole plans to use the money raised by the "Foster Father's Follies" — a talent show put on by the Appleby′s crew — to sponsor all the girls in a South Korean orphanage. Guest stars: Cherylene Lee, Grace Lee Whitney, James Hong, The Kim Sisters, and Dick Powell. Powell was the head of Four Star Television at the time.
5	"Operation: Jinx"	Hy Averback	Sheldon Keller and Howard Merrill	October 21, 1962
Seaman Jerome J. "Jinx" Johnson is assigned to the Appleby, and Chief Petty Officer Nelson informs the crew that trouble lies ahead because Johnson is considered an omen of bad luck in the U.S. Navy — and sure enough, things begin to wrong for the crew after Johnson reports aboard. Guest stars: Soupy Sales (as "Jinx" Johnson), Sandra Gould, Sid Gould, Clyde Adler, Harvey Perry, Michael Adair, and Ed Craig.
6	"Operation: Holdout"	Hy Averback	Sheldon Keller and Howard Merrill	October 28, 1962
The Appleby receives a request for help from two U.S. soldiers on a small Pacific island who claim they are under fire by Japanese troops. When the Appleby arrives to investigate, her crew finds two U.S. and two Japanese soldiers on the island who think World War II is still underway and are still fighting each other — but it is 1962, and World War II has been over since 1945. Guest stars: Mako, James Hong, Davis Roberts, Tige Andrews, and Eddie Ryder.
7	"Operation: Birthday"	Unknown	Unknown	November 4, 1962
O'Toole and the crew want to get Chief Petty Officer Nelson a present for his birthday — but they are all broke, and only Nelson has any money.
8	"Operation: Dinner Party"	Robert Gordon	Sheldon Keller and Howard Merrill	November 11, 1962
After Lieutenant (junior grade) St. John loses the money that Lieutenant Commander Stoner gave him to pay for a diplomatic party, O'Toole agrees to help St. John by arranging the party for free, planning to borrow food from other ships in the fleet and ask Chief Petty Officer Nelson to prepare something resembling "wine" for the event. Guest stars: Jay Novello, Jan Arvan, Veola Vonn, Norma Varden, Ramsey Hill, Irwin Ashkenazy, and George Baxter.
9	"Operation: Mess"	James Komack	James Allardice and Tom Adair	November 18, 1962
O'Toole is puzzled by complaints that the food aboard the Appleby is getting worse and worse because the ship's cook, Charlie, was once known as a good cook. Guest stars: Harry Morgan, Les Brown, Jr., Stafford Repp, Herbie Faye, Joe Higgins, Larry Perron, and John Kahn.
10	"Operation: Impersonation"	Unknown	Bill Davenport and Charles Tannen	November 25, 1962
After Lieutenant Commander Stoner drinks too much Malayan punch and is imprisoned for driving a truck through the prized garden of a Malayan general while drunk, O'Toole impersonates Appleby′s commanding officer to makes a plea to the furious general for mercy for Stoner. Guest stars: Edgar Barrier, Pamela Searle, Ben H. Wright, and Alan Caillou.
11	"Operation: Hypnosis"	Lawrence Dobkin	Bill Davenport and Charles Tannen	December 2, 1962
O'Toole uses hypnosis on Chief Petty Officer Nelson to get him to stop gambling, and on Lieutenant (junior grade) St. John to make him believe he is the finest lieutenant in the U.S. Navy — and chaos ensues. Guest star: Michael Adair.
12	"Operation: Potomac"	Hy Averback	Sheldon Keller and Howard Merrill	December 9, 1962
While the Appleby is in port at Washington, D.C., O"Toole begins to receive gifts from a secret admirer. When one of the gifts is a dress and the crew starts to rib him over it, O'Toole decides to find out who the gifts are supposed to be going to — and discovers that there is another Ensign O'Toole on the base who is a woman. Guest stars: Carolyn Kearney, Norm Alden, Dee Carroll, John Newton, Tyler McVey, Mike Mason, and Richard Eastham.
13	"Operation: Gaslight"	Lawrence Dobkin	James Allardice and Tom Adair	December 16, 1962
Ensign Clifford Bender, a recent graduate of the United States Naval Academy, reports aboard the Appleby, his first ship. He is an eager, by-the-book officer, and the Appleby′s crew receives orders to "shape up" for his arrival — but O'Toole decides that Bender needs a proper initiation to the U.S. Navy, so he sets out to convince Bender that he has come down with a strange nautical disease. Guest stars: Jamie Farr and Steve Franken.
14	"Operation: Brooklyn"	Jackie Cooper	Jack Raymond	December 23, 1962
Seaman Di Julio says that he can't re-enlist because he promised his parents that he would take over their restaurant in Brooklyn, New York, and let them retire, but O'Toole soon discovers that Di Julio does not want to leave the navy and his parents do not want to leave the restaurant. Guest stars: Penny Santon, Joe Higgens, Les Brown, Jr., Bob Hull, and Romo Vincent.
15	"Operation: Swindle"	Unknown	Unknown	December 30, 1962
Chief Petty Officer Nelson falls for a Southern lady named Leona who swindles him out of his money — and O'Toole decides to do something about it. Guest star: Rosemary De Camp , Charles Watts, and Dub Taylor.
16	"Operation: Treasure"	Lawrence Dobkin	Bill Davenport and Charles Tannen	January 6, 1963
Seaman White recovers a floating bottle that contains a mysterious map, and O'Toole thinks that the map could lead to buried treasure. Guest stars: Shary Marshall and Michael Ross.
17	"Operation: Intrigue"	Don Taylor	Sheldon Keller and Howard Merrill	January 13, 1963
When the Appleby visits Hong Kong, O'Toole discovers that Scotland Yard is hunting for jewel thieves there and decides it would be fun to help by going undercover disguised as a courier for the thieves — and runs afoul of both a jewel smuggler and some questionable tailors. Guest stars: Robert Emhardt, Howard Morris, Bernard Fox, Chana Eden, Philip Ahn, James Hong, and Harold Fong.
18	"Operation: Psychology"	Don Taylor	Bill Davenport and Charles Tannen	January 20, 1963
Lieutenant Commander Stoner's brother-in-law, psychologist Arthur Ainsley, visits the Appleby and observes that the crew seems too happy. He concludes that although the crewmen seem happy, they really are not, and actually are merely hiding a deep-seated depression. Guest star: John McGiver.
19	"Operation: Royalty"	Unknown	Unknown	January 27, 1963
O'Toole invites the Grand Admiral of the Navy of Tiboria, 12-year-old Prince Pussik, aboard the Appleby, but regrets it when he discovers that the young prince loves to give orders. Guest stars: Michael Davis and Lou Krugman.
20	"Operation: Whodunit"	Richard Kinon	Sheldon Keller and Howard Merrill	February 3, 1963
The Appleby′s crewmen are watching a movie — a murder mystery about the killing of Lord Mumbley — and have bet heavily on who the murderer is, so when they discover that the last reel of the film is missing they do everything they can to find it. Guest stars: Alan Caillou, Davis Roberts, John Tarangelo, and Kelly Gordon.
21	"Operation: Casanova"	Richard Kinon	Howard Leeds	February 10, 1963
O'Toole decides to boost Lieutenant (junior grade) St. John's deflated ego by arranging for him to socialize with some attractive WAVES. Everything goes well — until St. John is caught kissing the daughter of a United States congressman. Guest stars: Nancy Rennick, Carol Christensen, Cindy Robbons, Jacqeline Loughery, Ransom Sherman, and Jackie Joseph.
22	"Operation: Souvenir"	Richard Kinon	Bill Davenport and Charles Tannen	February 17, 1963
When the Appleby′s crewmen go on shore leave in Japan, Lieutenant Commander Stoner places them under strict orders not to return to the ship with any souvenirs too large to fit in a footlocker, posing a problem for Lieutenant (junior grade) St. John: He promised to buy an antique Japanese cannon for his girlfriend and has smuggled one aboard the Appleby, and he has to figure out how to hide it from Stoner. Guest stars: Don Beddoe and Alan Reed, Jr.
23	"Operation: Arrivederci"	Unknown	Unknown	March 3, 1963
When the Appleby visits Rome, O'Toole falls in love with Juliet Scarlatti, a struggling American artist. He lets her use the Appleby for an exhibit of her art in the hope of introducing her to some of the important people in the Italian art community — but the most important guest, society leader Mrs. Atherton, refuses to attend. Guest stars: Sharon Hugveny, Doris Packer, and Émile Genest.
24	"Operation: Re-Enlist"	Unknown	Unknown	March 10, 1963
After Lieutenant Commander Stoner receives orders to make sure the Appleby′s crew re-enlists in the Navy, O'Toole advises him to adopt a friendlier attitude toward the crewmen to encourage them to re-enlist, and Stoner's new behavior confuses the crew. When Stoner holds a party for the crew at his home, Seaman Di Julio pulls a brick out of the fireplace, causing Stoner's home to collapse — and the crew has to rebuild it for him.
25	"Operation: Boxer"	Unknown	Unknown	March 17, 1963
O'Toole always loses bets he makes with Ensign Baxter on bowling matches between the Appleby′s crew and the crew of Baxter's ship, but he thinks he has found a way to finally win a bet with Baxter: He bets Baxter on a boxing match between the ships and finds a huge sailor to fight Baxter's favorite boxer. Guest stars: Gary Crosby, Roger Torrey, and Cal Bolder.
26	"Operation: Stowaway"	Unknown	Unknown	March 24, 1963
While the Appleby is calling at a port in the Soviet Union, the crewmen think that O'Toole is faking a case of combat fatigue when he claims to have seen a beautiful girl peering at him through one of the Appleby′s portholes, but then they find that she is a stowaway named Anna. Smitten with her, they decide to make a party dress for her out of flags, tablecloths, and whatever else they can find aboard the ship. Guest star: Nita Talbot.
27	"Operation: Arctic"	Hy Averback	Jim Fritzell and Everett Greenbaum	March 31, 1963
The crew goes stir-crazy when life aboard the Appleby becomes terribly dull during a voyage to the Arctic in sub-freezing temperatures. Guest star: Martin Dean.
28	"Operation: Physical"	Unknown	Unknown	April 7, 1963
Lieutenant Commander Stoner is sad about the loss of his youth and concerned that he will not pass his upcoming physical, so O'Toole invites some of Stoner's old classmates for a visit to the Appleby in the hope that they look more "decrepit" than Stoner — and O'Toole's and the crew's attempts to help Stoner do not go as planned.
29	"Operation: Tubby"	Unknown	Unknown	April 14, 1963
After Seaman "Tubby" Mason is ordered to lose weight or be kicked out of the Navy, he goes on a crash diet — but O'Toole finds that Tubby's letters contain luncheon meat and his toothpaste tube is filled with liverwurst. Guest star: Stubby Kaye.
30	"Operation: Sabotage"	Unknown	Unknown	April 21, 1963
During maneuvers, plans call for the Appleby is to be the target of mock sabotage by a crew member secretly assigned to "blow up" the ship. Lieutenant Commander Stoner brags that the plot will never succeed, backs up his boast with a large bet, fakes the sabotage himself, and then challenges the crew to find the "saboteur" — and O'Toole, as usual, comes up with a clever idea.
31	"Operation: Contest"	Unknown	Unknown	April 28, 1963
The Appleby′s crew is quarantined and her crew misses shore leave in Hollywood after Seaman Di Julio suffers a mishap with a tanning lamp and is diagnosed with measles. To pass the time profitably they try entering various contests to win prize money — such as writing jingles for a music contest — one of which Di Julio wins. Lieutenant (junior grade) St. John’s mother's cookie recipe gets them invited to a cooking contest, where a woman they are competing against claims to be poor and needs the prize money, so they give up and let her win. They later discover that the woman cheated them, and has entered another contest. Guest star: Irene Tedrow.
32	"Operation: Geisha"	Unknown	Unknown	May 5, 1963
Two con men, Steve Turner and Al Shrieber, must return money they stole from an irate victim so they can open a reverse geisha house, and Lieutenant (junior grade) St John's friend comes up with a new money-making idea which O'Toole convinces the local businessmen is a good one. Guest stars: Jack Carter, Eddie Ryder, Ransom Sherman and Linda Bennett.
