= Hagan Beggs =

Northern Ireland-born Canadian actor (1937–2016)

- Hagan Beggs in Star Trek 1966
- Born: March 19, 1937
- Died: September 16, 2016 (aged 79)
- Occupation: Actor
- Known for: Danger Bay; Bordertown

Hagan Beggs (March 19, 1937 – September 16, 2016) was a Northern Irish-born Canadian actor. He was best known for starring as Dr. George Dunbar on the Canadian television series, Danger Bay, which aired on CBC Television and The Disney Channel from 1984 to 1990. Beggs also co-starred as Liam Gleeson on the Canadian series, Bordertown, from 1989 to 1991. His other television roles included a recurring role as Lt. Hansen during season one of Star Trek: The Original Series from 1966 to 1967.

Beggs was born in Belfast, Northern Ireland, on March 19, 1937. He immigrated to Canada as a young adult, where he worked as a film, radio, theater, and television actor, as well as a set decorator and props coordinator early in his career.

Beggs died in Vancouver, British Columbia, on September 16, 2016, at the age of 79.

== Filmography ==
Year	Title	Role	Notes	
1961	The Hired Gun			
1966	Star Trek: The Original Series	Lt. Hansen	S1:E11-E12, "The Menagerie", S1:E20, "Court Martial"	
1968	I Love a Mystery	Reggie York	Leslie Stevens	Unsold pilot filmed in 1966, later shown on NBC and in syndication
1968	Judd, for the Defense	Alex Gier	S2:E12, "A Swim with Sharks"	
1969	Here Come the Brides	Davey Hingle Claude	S1:E14, "The Firemaker", S2:E2, "The Wealthiest Man in Seattle"	
1970	Green Acres	Man	S5:E14, "The Wish-Book"	
1970	Medical Center	First Doctor	S1:E22, "The Combatants"	
1970	The Vendors	Coleman		
1972	The Groundstar Conspiracy	Dr. Hager		
1974	The Six Million Dollar Man	Jed Hall	S2:E9, "Act of Piracy"	
1975	Sally Fieldgood & Co	Leon		
1975	Russian Roulette	Kavinsky		
1976	El hombre desnudo			
1979	Bear Island	Larsen		
1980	The Changeling	Coroner		
1980	Crossover	Bateman		
1981	Spider-Man: The Dragon's Challenge	Clyde Evans	TV movie	
1983	Star 80	2nd Detective		
1985	The Journey of Natty Gann	Policeman		
1985	Perry Mason: The Case of the Notorious Nun	Richard Logan		
1985–1990	Danger Bay	Dr. George Dunbar	TV series	
1987	Home Is Where the Hart Is	Gravedigger		
1989–1991	Bordertown	Liam Gleeson	TV series	
1994	Power Play			
1994	Cyberteens in Love	Olderman		
