= George (1972 TV series) =

Swiss-Canadian television series

- Created by: Marshall Thompson
- Starring: Marshall Thompson; Trudy Young; Erna Sellmer; Volker Stewart
- Countries of origin: Canada; Switzerland; West Germany
- Original language: English
- No. of seasons: 1

Production
- Executive producers: Burt Rosen; David Winters; Murray Chercover
- Producers: Wallace Bennett; Michael Donohew
- Production locations: Grindelwald, Switzerland
- Production companies: Winters/Rosen Productions; Thompson-Intertel Productions; Agincourt Productions

Original release
- Network: CTV (Canada)
- Release: 16 September 1972 – 1973

George is a Swiss-Canadian television series which aired on CTV on Thursday evenings in 1972–73.

The series was based on the 1972 film George!, about the adventures of a St. Bernard dog and his owner who live in Switzerland. Marshall Thompson starred in both the film and the resulting half-hour series. The series made its CTV debut in a Thursday evening time slot on 16 September 1972. However, George ended in 1973 after its only season. The Globe and Mail's Blaik Kirby considered the program to be "abysmal". Despite its short run and mixed critical reaction, much like the situation with the television series The Trouble with Tracy, the series was rerun on CTV affiliates for years afterwards, usually to fill Saturday morning schedules.

== Cast ==
- Marshall Thompson – Jim Hunter
- Trudy Young – Aunt Helga
- Erna Sellmer – Frau Gerber
- Jack Mullaney – Walter
- Volker Stewart – Freddie

== Guest appearances ==
- Zsa Zsa Gabor
- Alan Hale Jr.
- Art Hindle
- John Banner
