= Marty Katz =

American film producer

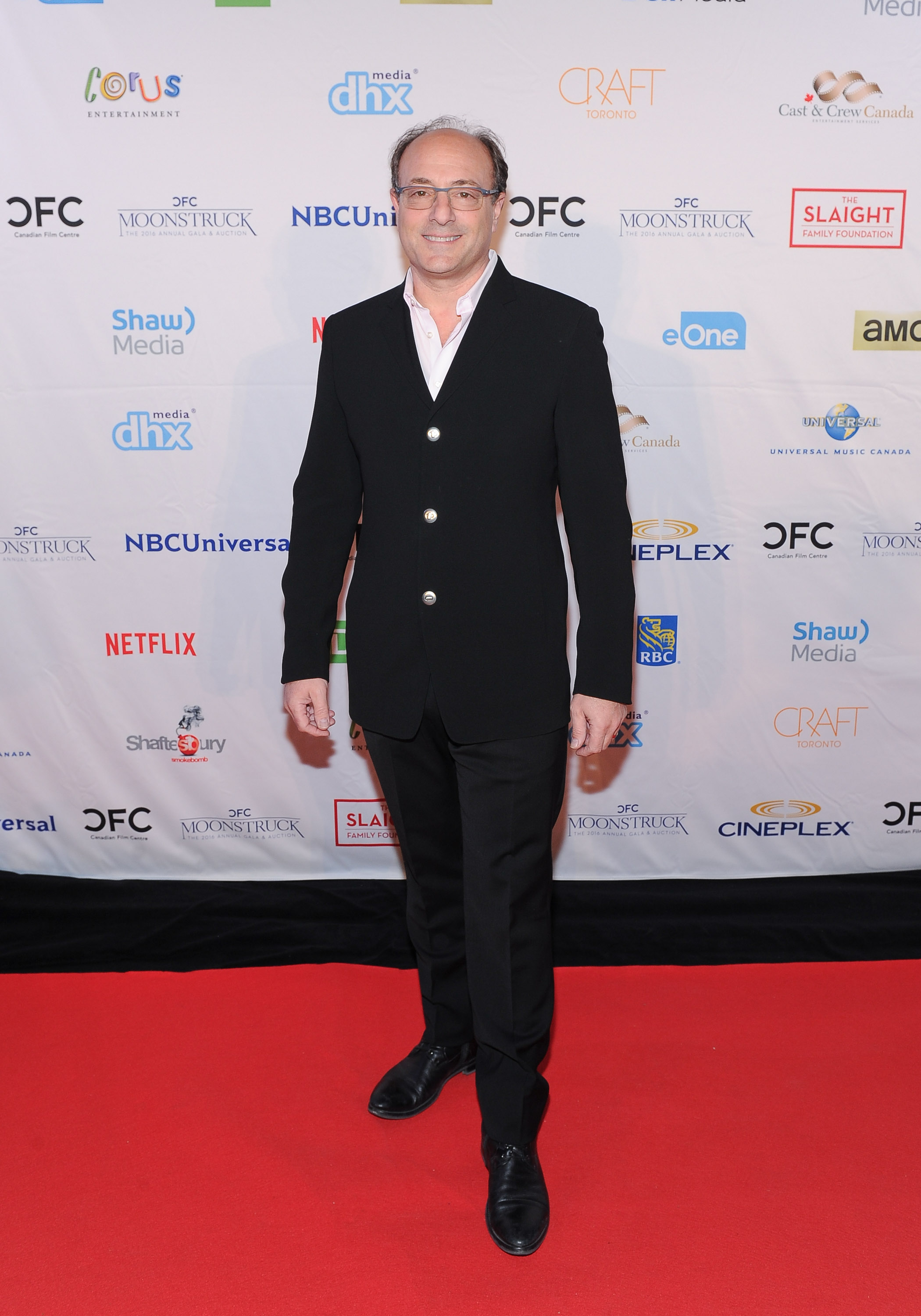
Katz in 2016

Marty Katz is a motion picture and television producer.

== Select filmography ==
| Year | Title |
|---|---|
| 1985 | Lost in America |
| 1995 | Man of the House |
| 1996 | Mr. Wrong |
| 2000 | Reindeer Games |
| 2010 | Love Ranch |
