= Charlayne Woodard =

American playwright and actress (born 1953)

- Woodard in Ain't Misbehavin', 1982
- Born: Charlaine Woodard; December 29, 1953 (age 72); Albany, New York, U.S.
- Education: Art Institute of Chicago (BFA)
- Occupations: Actress; playwright
- Years active: 1977–present
- Spouse: Alan Michael Harris (m. 1991)

Charlaine "Charlayne" Woodard (born December 29, 1953) is an American playwright and actress. She is a two-time Obie Award winner as well as a Tony Award and Drama Desk nominee. She was a series regular on the hit FX TV series Pose. She played the title role in the Showtime movie Run for the Dream: The Gail Devers’ Story. Starring as Cindy in the ABC Movie of the Week, Woodard was the first black Cinderella portrayed on TV or film. She is in Marvel Studios' miniseries Secret Invasion as Priscilla Fury, which premiered on June 21, 2023.

== Career ==
Woodard began her professional career in 1976 performing in the road company of Don't Bother Me I Can't Cope, written by Micki Grant and directed by Vinette Carroll, the first black female director on Broadway. In 1977, she made her Broadway debut in the revival of Hair, directed by Tom O’Horgan; played a supporting role in the movie version of Hair, directed by Milos Forman; starred as Cindy in the NBC Movie of the Week, Cindy; and performed on The Tonight Show.

In 1978, she was in the original company of the hit musical Ain't Misbehavin', for which she was nominated for both a Tony Award and Drama Desk Award for Best Featured Actress in a Musical. She reprised her role at Her Majesty's Theater in London's West End; the Aquarius theater in Los Angeles; and ten years after the Broadway opening, the Broadway revival with the original cast. NBC taped and broadcast the hit musical with the original Broadway cast. RCA released the original cast album.

Charlayne Woodard has written and performed five solo plays: Neat, Pretty Fire, In Real Life, The Night Watcher and Flight.

The Garden, a two-hander commissioned by the La Jolla Playhouse, was produced at both Baltimore Center Stage and The LaJolla Playhouse. Woodard's plays are published by Dramatists Play Service.

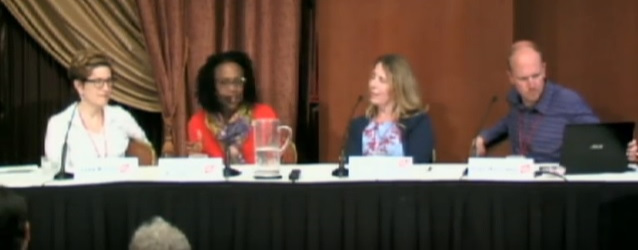
Woodard (second from left) speaks at the Dramatists Guild of America in 2015, with (ltr) Lisa Kron, Laurie Flanigan-Hegge, and Josh Hartwell

As an actress, Woodard's off-Broadway theatre credits include Daddy (2019) by Jeremy O. Harris, directed by Danya Taymor Signature Theater; played Gertrude to Oscar Issac's Hamlet, directed by Sam Gold, at the Public Theater; War (2016) by Brandon-Jacobs Jenkins, directed by Liliana Blain-Cruz at Lincoln Center; the 2014 revival of The Substance of Fire by John Robin Baitz, directed by Trip Cullman at Second Stage; The Witch of Edmonton (2010) directed by Jessie Berger, for which she was awarded her second Obie Award, at The Red Bull Theatre Company; world premiere of in the Blood (1999) by Suzan-Lori Parks directed by David Esbjornson for which she was awarded her first Obie Award; Fabulation (2004) by Lynn Nottage, directed by Kate Whorisky at Playwright's Horizons; Stunning (2009) by David Adjmi, directed By Anne Kauffman at LCT3; Sorrows and Rejoicings, written and directed by Athol Fugard at Second Stage for which she received an Audelco Award; The Caucasian Chalk Circle (1990), directed by George C. Wolfe at the Public Theatre; Twelfth Night (1989) alongside Michelle Pfeiffer, Gregory Hines, Jeff Goldblum, and Mary Elizabeth Mastrantonio at Shakespeare in the Park; Paradise (1985) a musical with lyrics by George C. Wolfe, music by Robert Forest, directed by Ted Pappas at Playwrights Horizons. Woodard's regional credits include: Midsummer Night's Dream, directed by Chris Ashley, as well as Shout Up A Morning, directed by Des McAnuff, both at the La Jolla Playhouse; The Taming of the Shrew (Kate), directed by Rebecca Taishman at Shakespeare Theatre Company; The Good Person of Szechwan, adapted by Tony Kushner, directed by Lisa Peterson at the LaJolla Playhouse; and Purgatorio by Ariel Dorfman, directed by David Esbjornson at Seattle Rep.

Notable film roles include Hard Feelings (1982) for which she received a Canadian Genie Award for Best Performance by a Foreign Actress nomination; Crackers (1984) alongside Sean Penn, Donald Sutherland and Jack Warner, directed by Louis Malle; Twister (1989), alongside Tim Robbins, Dylan McDermott and Harry Dean Stanton, directed by Michael Almereyda; One Good Cop (1991) alongside Michael Keaton (1991); Eye for an Eye (1995) opposite Sally Field and Kiefer Sutherland; Tituba in the 1996 drama film The Crucible, alongside Daniel Day-Lewis and Winona Ryder, directed by Nicolas Hytner; Touched By Evil (1997) alongside Paula Abdul; Around the Fire (1998) directed by John Jacobson; John Sayle’s Sunshine State (2002) alongside Angela Bassett; M. Night Shyamalan’s Unbreakable (2000) and its sequel Glass (2019) alongside Samuel L. Jackson; The Million Dollar Hotel (2000) alongside Mel Gibson, directed by Wim Wenders; Things Never Said (2013) written and directed by Charles Murray.

Among Woodard's many TV roles are Priscilla Fury in Marvel Studios' miniseries, Secret Invasion (2023) which reunites her with Jackson; season regular on Pose (2018); recurring roles on In Treatment season 4; Animal Kingdom (2021); Prodigal Son (2019–2020); Sneaky Pete (2019); and Terminator: The Sarah Connor Chronicles (2008). Earlier roles included Roseanne (1988–1989); The Fresh Prince of Bel-Air (1991–1993); Sweet Justice (1994); Frasier (1994); Chicago Hope (1994–2000); Sister Peg on Law & Order: Special Victims Unit (2002–2011); and ER (2006–2007).

== Filmography ==
=== Film ===
Year	Title	Role	Notes
1978	Cindy	Cindy	TV movie
1979	Hair	White Boys	
1981	The Big Bang and Other Creation Myths	Vocalist (voice)	Short
1982	Hard Feelings	Winona Lockhart	
1984	Crackers	Jasmine	
1987	The Adventures of Mr. Men	Mrs. Crumb, Jack (voice)	Direct-to-video, American dub
1988	God Bless the Child	Chandra Watkins	TV movie
1988	Me and Him	Dancing Secretary	
1989	Twister	Lola	
1991	He Said, She Said	Cindy	
1991	One Good Cop	Cheryl Clark	
1993	The Meteor Man	Janice Farrell	
1994	Angie	Floor Nurse	
1994	Babyfever	Eartha	
1995	Buffalo Girls	Doosie	TV movie
1996	Eye for an Eye	Angel Kosinsky	
1996	Run for the Dream: The Gail Devers Story	Gail Devers	TV movie
1996	The Crucible	Tituba	
1997	Touched By Evil	Detective Duvall	TV movie
1998	The Wedding	–	TV movie
1998	Around the Fire	Kate	
2000	The Million Dollar Hotel	Jean Swift	
2000	Unbreakable	Mrs. Price	
2001	H.M.O.	–	TV movie
2002	Sunshine State	Loretta	
2003	D.C. Sniper: 23 Days of Fear	Mildred Muhammad	TV movie
2005	Lackawanna Blues	Bill's Woman	TV movie
2006	Southern Comfort	Female Detective	TV movie
2013	Things Never Said	Charlotte	
2019	Glass	Mrs. Price	

=== Television ===
Year	Title	Role	Notes
1982	Taxi	Nina Chambers	Episode: "Nina Loves Alex"
1985	Spenser: For Hire	Dorothy Marks	Episode: "Blood Money"
1988	Wiseguy	Emanja Mora	Episode: "Blood Dance"
1988–89	Roseanne	Vonda Green	Recurring cast: Season 1–2
1990	A Different World	Medic	Episode: "21 Candles"
1991–92	Days of Our Lives	Desiree McCall	Regular Cast
1991–93	The Fresh Prince of Bel-Air	Janice	Recurring cast: Season 2–3
1994	Frasier	Arlene	Episode: "Flour Child"
1994	Sweet Justice	Harriet Battle-Wilkins	Episode: "The Power of Darkness: Parts 1 & 2"
1994	Chicago Hope	Dr. Paula Michelson	Episode: "Shutt Down"
1996	Bless This House	Charlene	Episode: "The Bowling Method"
1996-00	Chicago Hope	Gina Wilkes	Recurring cast: Season 3–5, guest: Season 6
2002–11	Law & Order: Special Victims Unit	Sister Peg	Guest: Season 3–4 & 8 & 12, Recurring cast: Season 5–6
2003	Boomtown	Marvella King	Episode: "Fearless"
2004	Strong Medicine	Margaret Morganfield	Episode: "The Real World Rittenhouse"
2004	The Division	Mrs. Davis	Episode: "Lost and Found"
2006	In Justice	Sister Gloria Quinn	Episode: "The Public Burning"
2006	Shark	Prof. Emily Chambers	Episode: "Fashion Police"
2006–07	ER	Angela Gilliam	Recurring cast: Season 13
2008	Terminator: The Sarah Connor Chronicles	Terissa Dyson	Episode: "Pilot" & "The Turk"
2009	Medium	Dr. Richards	Episode: "The Man in the Mirror"
2012	Bones	Diane Rollins	Episode: "The Patriot in Purgatory"
2015	Chasing Life	Monica Bradley	Episode: "Cancer Friends with Benefits"
2015	The Leftovers	Lois Makepeace	Episode: "A Matter of Geography"
2016	The Blacklist	Allison Gaines	Episode: "The Director (No. 24): Conclusion"
2016	People of Earth	Judy	Episode: "Lost and Found"
2018–19	Pose	Helena St. Rogers	Main Cast: Season 1 & Season 2
2019	Sneaky Pete	Hickey	Recurring cast: Season 3
2019	Bluff City Law	Gertrude LaRue	Episode: "When the Levee Breaks"
2019–20	Prodigal Son	Dr Gabrielle Le Deux	Recurring cast: Season 1
2020	Bull	Dawn Taylor	Episode: "Child of Mine"
2021	All Rise	Judge Prudence Jenkins	Episode: "Caught Up in Circles"
2021	In Treatment	Rhonda	Recurring cast: Season 4
2021	Animal Kingdom	Pamela "Pam" Johnson	Recurring cast: Season 5
2023	Secret Invasion	Varra / Priscilla Davis Fury	Main cast
2023	Mayfair Witches	Dolly Jean Mayfair	Recurring cast
2024	The Spiderwick Chronicles	Lucinda Spiderwick	Recurring cast

== Awards and nominations ==
Year	Award	Category	Work	Result
1978	Tony Award	Best Supporting Actress in a Musical	Ain't Misbehavin'	Nominated
1978	Drama Desk Award	Outstanding Actress In A Musical	Ain't Misbehavin'	Nominated
1983	Genie Awards	Genie Award for Best Performance by a Foreign Actress	Hard Feelings	Nominated
1985	Drama Desk Award	Outstanding Featured Actress in a Musical	Hang On To The Good Times	Nominated
1992	Los Angeles Critics Award	Best Play	Pretty Fire	Won
1992	Los Angeles Critics Award	Best Playwright	Pretty Fire	Won
1992	NAACP Award	Best Play	Pretty Fire	Won
1992	NAACP Award	Best Playwright	Pretty Fire	Won
1996	Irving & Blanche Theater Vision Award		Neat	Won
1996	Backstage West Garland Award	Best Play	Neat	Won
2000	Obie Award	Best Performance	In The Blood	Won
2001	Backstage West Garland Award	Best Playwright	In Real Life	Won
2001	Backstage West Garland Award	Best Actor	In Real Life	Won
2001	Audelco Award		In Real Life	Won
2001	Drama Desk Award	Best solo Performance	In Real Life	Nominated
2001	Outer Critics Circle Award	Best solo Performance	In Real Life	Nominated
2006	Honorary Doctor of Humane Letters			Awarded
2010	Los Angeles Critics Award	Best Solo Performance	The Nightwatcher	Won
2010	Los Angeles Critics Award	Best Play	The Nightwatcher	Nominated
2010	NAACP Award	Best Solo Performance	The Nightwatcher	Won
2010	NAACP Award	Best Play	The Nightwatcher	Nominated
2010	Audelco Award		The Nightwatcher	Won
2010	Obie Award	Best Performance	Witch of Edmonton	Won
2018	Matadour Award	Excellence in Classical Acting		Won
