= Don't Send Me Roses (Dear Abby) =

Song by Yvonne Murray
- A-side: "Don't Send Me Roses (Dear Abby)"
- B-side: "One Day At a Time"
- Released: 1983
- Label: MCG JM8368
- Songwriter(s): J. Ian Mclean
- Producer(s): Paul Zaza

Yvonne Murray singles chronology
"Don't Send Me Roses" (1983)	"Let's Not Waste Another Heartbeat" (1984)

"Don't Send Me Roses (Dear Abby)" was a hit single for Irish born Toronto-based singer Yvonne Murray. Produced by Paul Zaza the single brought Murray national recognition, registering in two charts.

== Background ==
The single for "Don't Send Me Roses (Dear Abby)" was backed with "One Day at a Time" and released on MCG JM8368. Both sides were composed by J. Ian McClean with Paul Zaza handling both arrangement and production. With her self-titled debut album being reviewed in the September 24, 1983 issue of RPM Weekly, "Don't Send Me Roses (Dear Abby)" had entered the RPM Contemporary Adult chart at #29. Murray's management company, the Meloche Communications Group had launched an aggressive campaign to promote the album to tie it in with the release of the single which was taken from the album.

== Charts ==
For the week ending October 8, the single entered the RPM Country 50 Singles chart at number 50 and was at number 24 on the RPM Contemporary Adult chart. The song peaked at number 13 on the tenth week in the RPM Contemporary Adult chart on November 26. It also peaked on that date at number 22 in its eighth week in the RPM Country Singles chart.

Chart performance for "Don't Send Me Roses (Dear Abby)"
Chart (1983)	Peak position
RPM Country 50 Singles	22
RPM Contemporary Adult	13
