= Melanie (film) =

- Directed by: Rex Bromfield
- Written by: Richard Paluck; Robert Guza Jr.
- Produced by: Peter Simpson
- Starring: Glynnis O'Connor; Burton Cummings; Don Johnson; Lisa Dalbello; Paul Sorvino
- Cinematography: Richard Ciupka
- Edited by: Brian Ravok
- Music by: Paul Zaza; Burton Cummings
- Distributed by: 20th Century Fox (Canada); Avco Embassy Pictures (USA)
- Release dates: 12 February 1982 (USA); 19 February 1982 (Canada)
- Running time: 104 minutes
- Country: Canada
- Language: English
- Budget: CDN$4,3 million

Melanie is a 1982 Canadian drama film directed by Rex Bromfield, starring Glynnis O'Connor, Burton Cummings, Paul Sorvino and Don Johnson.

== Plot summary ==
Melanie, a rural Arkansas woman, travels to Los Angeles in an effort to regain custody of her son from her ex-husband, Carl. Her illiteracy poses a major obstacle. She meets Rick, a faded musician, with whom she develops a relationship. Rick's attorney teaches her to read and write, and helps her with her custody fight.

== Cast ==
- Glynnis O'Connor as Melanie
- Paul Sorvino as Walter
- Burton Cummings as Rick
- Trudy Young as Ronda
- Don Johnson as Carl
- Donann Cavin as Ginny
- Jamie Dick as Tyler
- Jodie Drake as Eula
- Lisa Dalbello as Marcie
- Yvonne Murray as Brandy
- Martha Gibson as Waitress
- Rocco Bellusci as Dana
- David Wills as Daryll Adrian
- L. Q. Jones as Buford (uncredited)

== Production ==
=== Development and casting ===
The film was based on the novella A Melanie Without Words by American author Michael C. Green, whose rights were acquired by producer Peter R. Simpson around early 1980. Cummings was approached to star on the basis of his promotional appearances on Canadian television and his hosting of the Juno Awards. He was still asked to audition, and was initially not attracted to his self-absorbed, troubled character. He was required to grow his hair back to match the look he had a few years prior, right after the split of his popular band The Guess Who. This highlighted the parallels between Cummings' career and that of his character, although the real-world singer did not experience anything close to his alter ego's dramatic downfall. An acting novice, Cummings struggled for the first ten days of the shoot, but was motivated by the opportunity to work opposite respected thespian Paul Sorvino, a favorite of his.

Cummings rearranged existing songs and wrote some original ones for the film, including "You Saved My Soul", which describes the two main characters' relationship. The new material was included on Cummings' then-current album Sweet Sweet, of which "You Saved My Soul" was the opening track. Fellow Canadian musicians Lisa Dalbello and David Wills of Stonebolt also feature in the film, in dual speaking and musical roles.

=== Filming and post-production ===
The film had a budget of CDN$4.3 million. Filming began in Toronto on 2 June 1980, while some scenes were shot in Los Angeles. Principal photography concluded on 24 July 1980, although additional filming took place during a Burton Cummings concert staged for the occasion on 29 October 1980, at Ryerson Polytechnic Institute in front of 3,000 fans. The show also benefited the Canadian Juvenile Diabetes Foundation, to which a CDN$15,000 donation was presented. Cummings delivered a real one-hour performance to warm up the crowd, then played four takes of each of the film's songs. The concert sequence, which was supposed to signify the redemption of Cummings' character, was ultimately cut from the picture as Melanie's reunion with her son was deemed a stronger conclusion, of which the singer was understanding. A few excerpts of his live gig remain in the end credits.

== Release ==
The film was acquired for U.S. distribution by Avco Embassy, with whom Simcom had an existing relationship, with a tentative October or November 1981 release date. It was eventually released in February 1982 in both Canada and the U.S.

=== Reception ===
Ned Powers of the Saskatoon Star-Phoenix wrote that "a compelling performance by O'Connor and a surprisingly fluid effort by Cummings lift the picture beyond the fair-to-middling category", adding that "the music, most written and performed by Cummings, is a strong selling point". Bruce Bailey of The Montreal Gazette echoed Powers' praise of Glynnis O'Connor, but otherwise found the film to be a calculating melodrama. Calling it "a successful manipulator of emotions", he noted that the crowd erupted into cheers when Melanie finally hit back at her cruel husband, noting that "the morality of encouraging such applause for violence on anybody's part, however, is a little dicey."

South of the border, Roger Ebert noted in his nationally syndicated review for the Chicago Sun-Times that Melanie was "an uneven and sometimes frustrating but very alive movie".

== Awards ==
Melanie earned seven nominations for the 4th Genie Awards:

- Best Performance by a Foreign Actress: Glynnis O'Connor (won)
- Best Original Song: Burton Cummings "You Saved My Soul" (won)
- Best Adapted Screenplay: Richard Paluck and Robert Guza Jr. ~~(won)~~ (rescinded)
  - After the ceremony, the Academy of Canadian Cinema & Television learned that the short story on which the screenplay was based had not been previously published, making it not an adaptation according to the rules of the award.
- Best Direction: Rex Bromfield (nominated)
- Best Supporting Actress: Trudy Young (nominated)
- Best Costume Design: Julie Ganton (nominated)
- Sound Editing: Wayne Griffin and Dennis Drummond (nominated)
