= Robert Sorrells =

American actor

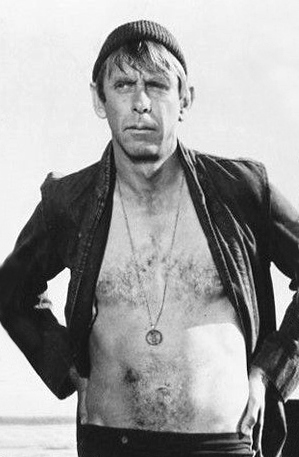
- Sorrells in The Wonderful World of Disney, c. 1968
- Born: June 29, 1930; Dallas, Texas, U.S.
- Died: June 11, 2019 (aged 88); Vacaville, California, U.S.
- Resting place: Cremated
- Occupation: Actor
- Years active: 1959–1990
- Convictions: Murder, attempted murder
- Penalty: 32 years to life

Robert D. Sorrells (June 29, 1930 – June 11, 2019) was an American television and film actor, active through the 1960s, 70s and 80s. He died in prison while serving an indeterminate life sentence for a murder he committed in 2004.

== Acting career ==
As an actor, Sorrells is probably best known for his role as the baseball-pitching robot Casey in the Twilight Zone episode "The Mighty Casey". Additionally, he was in 26 episodes of Ensign O'Toole. He was also known for his appearances in Westerns such as Gunsmoke, Rawhide and Bonanza. He later appeared in films such as Fletch and Bound for Glory.

== Murder and attempted murder convictions ==
On July 24, 2004, Sorrells was drinking in a bar in Simi Valley, California, when he became belligerent. Another patron, Arthur DeLong, forcibly escorted Sorrells from the bar. Sorrells went home, got his pistol, and returned to the bar, where he shot DeLong in the back at point-blank range, killing him. Sorrells then shot a bystander named Edward Sanchez, with whom he had had no previous interaction. He then fled the scene in a Volkswagen van, but was arrested a short distance away.

Sorrells was charged with one count of premeditated murder and one count of attempted premeditated murder. Sorrells initially pled not guilty by reason of insanity, but entered a guilty plea in May, 2005. In July, 2005 he was sentenced to 32 years to life. Sorrells died in prison at Vacaville, California, on June 11, 2019, at the age of 88.

== Filmography ==
Year	Title	Role	Notes
1960	The Twilight Zone	Casey	Episode: "The Mighty Casey"
1961	Gunsmoke	Augie	Episode: "Apprentice Doctor"
1961	All Hands on Deck	Jones	
1962	Ichabod and Me	Blake	Episode: "The Celebrity"
1962	All Fall Down	Waiter in Sweet Shop	(scenes deleted)
1962-1963	Ensign O'Toole	White	26 episodes
1963	Gunsmoke	Cloudy	“The Glory & The Mud” (S9E14)
1963-1969	Bonanza	Charlie / Deputy Sheriff Cyril / John Swanson / Meredith Smith / Ferguson / Sid	5 episodes
1964	The Outer Limits	Fred	Episode: "I Robot"
1965	Morituri	Koeniger	
1965	Gunsmoke	Sled Grady	Season 10, Episode 25: "Breckinridge"
1966	Gunsmoke	Outlaw Handley	Season 12, Episode 10: "The Newcomers"
1966	Bewitched	Gus Walters	Episode: "The Horse's Mouth"
1966	The Fugitive	Curly	Episode: "The Devil's Disciples"
1967	Gunfight in Abilene	Nelson	
1967	Mosby's Marauders	Pvt. Starkey	Television movie
1967	The Ride to Hangman's Tree	Blake	
1967	The Last Challenge	Harry Bell	
1968	A Man Called Gannon	Goff	
1969	Death of a Gunfighter	Chris Hogg	
1970	San Francisco International Airport	Dan	Minor role in a TV movie pilot
1970	Mannix	Clement North	episode One for the Lady
1976	Bound for Glory	Charlie Guthrie - Woody's Father	
1978	The Bad News Bears Go to Japan	Locke	
1985	Fletch	Marvin Stanwyk	
1989	Nowhere to Run	Mr. Kitchens	
