= You Saved My Soul =

Single by Burton Cummings

from the album Sweet Sweet
- B-side: "Real Good"
- Released: August 1981
- Recorded: 1981
- Genre: Soft rock
- Length: 3:39
- Label: Alfa
- Songwriter: Burton Cummings
- Producers: Burton Cummings, Bruce Robb

Burton Cummings singles chronology
"One and Only" (1980)	"You Saved My Soul" (1981)	"Mother Keep Your Daughters In" (1982)

"You Saved My Soul" is a 1981 single by Canadian musician Burton Cummings, from the 1981 album Sweet Sweet. The single reached the top 40 in Canada and the U.S. and also charted on the Adult Contemporary charts of both countries, peaking at numbers 12 and 22, respectively.

Originally written and recorded for the film Melanie, which starred Cummings and Glynnis O'Connor as a man and woman entering into a romantic relationship, the song won the Genie Award for Best Original Song at the 4th Genie Awards.
