= Alphabet Soup (TV series) =

Canadian children's television series

- Genre: Children's television Educational
- Written by: Pat Patterson
- Directed by: Dennis Coles
- Presented by: Trudy Young; Marc Stonedr; Mavis Kerr; Lynn Griffin
- Country of origin: Canada
- Original language: English

Production
- Producer: Dennis Coles
- Running time: 30 minutes

Original release
- Network: CBC Television
- Release: October 5, 1971 – December 4, 1973

Alphabet Soup is a Canadian children's television series that aired on CBC Television between October 5, 1971, and December 4, 1973. Each week, Trudy Young, Marc Stone, Lynn Griffin and puppet Arbuckle the Alligator would invite a guest who would talk about a subject beginning with a letter of the week.

Occasional guest Mavis Kerr, a science educator/entertainer at the Ontario Science Centre in Toronto, joined the team when Lynn Griffin became ill.
