= The Toaster (film) =

- French: Le Toasteur
- Directed by: Michel Bouchard
- Written by: Michel Bouchard; Robert Gurik
- Produced by: Michel Bouchard
- Starring: Gabriel Arcand; Jean Mathieu; Jean-Pierre Saulnier
- Cinematography: Pierre Mignot
- Edited by: André Corriveau
- Music by: Alain Clavier
- Production company: Cinékina
- Distributed by: Cinémathèque québécoise
- Release date: 1982
- Running time: 27 minutes
- Country: Canada
- Language: English

The Toaster (French: Le Toasteur) is a Canadian comedy short film, directed by Michel Bouchard and released in 1982. The film stars Gabriel Arcand as Louis, an assembly line worker in a toaster factory who decides to rebel against the monotony of always performing the same task over and over again by breaking into the factory after hours to assemble an entire toaster, from start to finish, himself.

The cast also includes Jean Mathieu, Jean-Pierre Saulnier, George Antoniades, Joan Lenarcic, Don Rideout, Tony Rinella, Donna Taborowski and Lottie Urbanek.

The film was a Genie Award nominee for Best Theatrical Short Film at the 4th Genie Awards in 1983.
