= Threshold (1981 film) =

- Directed by: Richard Pearce
- Written by: James Salter
- Produced by: Jon Slan; Michael Burns
- Starring: Donald Sutherland; Jeff Goldblum; Sharon Acker; Mare Winningham
- Cinematography: Michel Brault
- Edited by: Susan Martin; Bill Yahraus
- Music by: Maribeth Solomon; Micky Erbe
- Distributed by: Pan-Canadian Film Distributors
- Release date: 1981
- Running time: 97 minutes
- Country: Canada
- Language: English

Threshold is a 1981 Canadian drama/science fiction film directed by Richard Pearce, and starring Donald Sutherland and Jeff Goldblum. It was nominated for ten Genie Awards in 1983 and won two of them. Sutherland also won best actor at the 1982 Karlovy Vary International Film Festival for his performance. Threshold was filmed on location at the then newly constructed Ottawa General Hospital.

== Plot ==
Respected cardiac surgeon Dr. Thomas Vrain performs a risky operation to provide a patient with the first artificial heart ever implanted in a human subject.

He and his colleague, research scientist Dr. Aldo Gehring, consider the risks and weigh the odds as time runs out for Carol Severance, the patient. Severance will die unless the experimental surgery is done quickly and succeeds.

== Cast ==
- Donald Sutherland as Dr. Thomas Vrain
- Jeff Goldblum as Dr. Aldo Gehring
- Sharon Acker as Tilla Vrain
- Mare Winningham as Carol Severance
- John Marley as Edgar Fine
- Allan Nicholls as Dr. Basil Rents
