= The Grey Fox =

1982 Canadian film by Phillip Borsos

- Film poster
- Directed by: Phillip Borsos
- Written by: John Hunter
- Produced by: Peter O'Brian
- Starring: Richard Farnsworth; Jackie Burroughs; Wayne Robson; Ken Pogue
- Cinematography: Frank Tidy
- Edited by: Frank Irvine
- Music by: Michael Conway Baker; Paddy Moloney (main theme)
- Production company: Zoetrope Studios
- Distributed by: United Artists Classics
- Release dates: 24 July 1982 (Taormina); 16 December 1982 (Canada); 18 March 1983 (U.S.)
- Running time: 92 minutes
- Country: Canada
- Language: English
- Budget: $4.5 million
- Box office: $6 million

The Grey Fox is a 1982 Canadian biographical Western film directed by Phillip Borsos and written by John Hunter. It is based on the true story of Bill Miner, an American stagecoach robber who staged his first Canadian train robbery on 10 September 1904. The film stars Richard Farnsworth as Miner. The cast also features Jackie Burroughs, Ken Pogue, Wayne Robson, Gary Reineke and Timothy Webber.

== Plot ==
Stagecoach robber Bill Miner is caught and sent to prison for 33 years. He is finally released in 1901. He wanders around, a man out of place in the new century, until he sees one of the first films, The Great Train Robbery, and is inspired to copy it in real life. After a couple of unsuccessful attempts, he successfully robs a train and hides from the law in a mining town in British Columbia, becoming a respectable resident. There, he meets and falls in love with early feminist and photographer Katherine Flynn. He considers settling down with her, but one last robbery proves to be his downfall. True to his nickname, the Grey Fox escapes from prison as the ending credits start.

== Cast ==
- Richard Farnsworth as Bill Miner / George Edwards
- Jackie Burroughs as Katherine 'Kate' Flynn
- Ken Pogue as Jack Budd
- Wayne Robson as Shorty (William) Dunn
- Timothy Webber as Sergeant Fernie
- Gary Reineke as Pinkerton Detective Seavy
- Sean Sullivan as Newspaper Editor
- Tom Glass as The Mountie

== Production ==
Phillip Borsos first learned about Bill Miner as a teenager and wanted to adapt Miner's life into film; The Grey Fox was the first feature-length narrative film directed by Borsos. Harry Dean Stanton was originally planned to star as Miner and ads were taken out featuring him as Miner. However, he withdrew from the production in order to star in One from the Heart and Richard Farnsworth was selected to replace him. Zoetrope allowed the production the use of support facilities as a way to make up for taking Stanton, which is how they are listed as the production company, although their finances precluded them from distributing it.

According to Farnsworth, the "picture company" was the only one ever allowed to film at Fort Steele, British Columbia, a heritage site. The Grey Fox was also filmed on the British Columbia Railway / Pacific Great Eastern Railway, now run by Canadian National Railway, between Pemberton and Lillooet, British Columbia, and the Lake Whatcom Railway between Wickersham and Park, Washington. The capture sequence was shot a quarter of a mile from where Miner was actually caught. Miner's gun, "a .41 Bisley Colt", was obtained from a collector and used by Farnsworth in close-ups.

Scenes from The Great Train Robbery are intercut with new footage made to look similar to the older footage. The film was scored by composer Michael Conway Baker and the Irish traditional group The Chieftains.

The film was funded by selling 696 units for $5,000 each to investors, and it was edited in 1981 before a distributor was found. Phillip Borsos was paid $45,000 to direct the film. The film was shot from 7 October to 28 November 1980, and had a budget of $3,480,000 (equivalent to $12,986,727 in 2025), but cost $4,500,000 (equivalent to $16,793,182 in 2025) to make.

== Release ==
The film was shown at the Taormina Film Fest in June 1982, and was released in Toronto on 16 December 1982. It grossed over $6 million at the box office in its first year. According to Phil Hardy, The Grey Fox was one of seven western films released in 1982, compared to 27 in 1972.

== Critical response ==
Roger Ebert praised the film as "a lovely adventure" and gave it 3 1/2 stars. Rotten Tomatoes gave it a rare 100% fresh rating, based on twenty-nine reviews. The Critics Consensus reads: "The Grey Fox takes liberties with the real-life history that inspired it, but director Philip Borsos' aim is true -- as is Richard Farnsworth's work in the title role." Vincent Canby, reviewing the film for the New York Times, praised Farnsworth's screen presence and Frank Tidy's cinematography.

== Awards ==
The Grey Fox has been designated and preserved as a "masterwork" by the Audio-Visual Preservation Trust of Canada, a charitable non-profit organization dedicated to promoting the preservation of Canada’s audio-visual heritage.

At the 4th Genie Awards in 1983, The Grey Fox was nominated for thirteen awards and won seven:

- Best Picture
- Best Director (Borsos)
- Best Foreign Actor (Farnsworth)
- Best Supporting Actress (Burroughs)
- Best Original Screenplay (Hunter)
- Best Art Direction (Bill Brodie)
- Best Musical Score (Michael Conway Baker)

Further recognition for Farnsworth included a Golden Globe Award nomination for Best Actor in a Motion Picture – Drama.

It has also been listed in the Toronto International Film Festival's TIFF List of Canada's Top Ten Films of All Time in 1984 and 1993.

== Restoration and re-release ==
The film underwent a 4K restoration and was re-released to theatres In April 2020. It also saw its first official release to DVD and Blu-Ray, which included a commentary by filmmaker Alex Cox, interview with producer Peter O'Brian, and a featurette about the restoration.

== Works cited ==
- Melnyk, George (2004). One Hundred Years of Canadian Cinema. University of Toronto Press. ISBN 080203568X.
- Turner, D. John, ed. (1987). Canadian Feature Film Index: 1913-1985. Canadian Film Institute. ISBN 0660533642.
- Walz, Eugene, ed. (2002). Canada's Best Features: Critical essays on 15 Canadian films. Brill Publishers. ISBN 9789401200141.
