= The Mighty Casey =

- The Twilight Zone episode
- Episode no.: Season 1 Episode 35
- Directed by: Robert Parrish; Alvin Ganzer
- Written by: Rod Serling
- Production code: 173-3617
- Original air date: June 17, 1960

Guest appearances
- Jack Warden as McGarry; Robert Sorrells as Casey; Abraham Sofaer as Dr. Stillman; Alan Dexter as Beasley; Don O'Kelly as Monk; Jonathan Hole as the Team Doctor; Rusty Lane as the Commissioner

Episode chronology
← Previous "The After Hours"	Next → "A World of His Own"
- The Twilight Zone (1959 TV series, season 1)

"The Mighty Casey" is episode thirty-five of the American television anthology series The Twilight Zone. Its title is a reference to the baseball poem "Casey at the Bat". It originally aired on June 17, 1960, on CBS. The episode was written by Rod Serling, and directed by Robert Parrish and Alvin Ganzer.

== Opening narration ==
What you're looking at is a ghost, once alive but now deceased. Once upon a time, it was a baseball stadium that housed a major league ball club known as the Hoboken Zephyrs. Now it houses nothing but memories and a wind that stirs in the high grass of what was once an outfield, a wind that sometimes bears a faint, ghostly resemblance to the roar of a crowd that once sat here. We're back in time now, when the Hoboken Zephyrs were still a part of the National League, and this mausoleum of memories was an honest-to-Pete stadium. But since this is strictly a story of make believe, it has to start this way: once upon a time, in Hoboken, New Jersey, it was tryout day. And though he's not yet on the field, you're about to meet a most unusual fella, a left-handed pitcher named Casey.

== Plot ==
"Mouth" McGarry, the manager of a broken-down baseball team called the Hoboken Zephyrs on its last legs, is introduced to Dr. Stillman, an inventor who built a robot named Casey to play on the team. Casey has the ability to throw super-fast balls, super-slow balls, and extreme curveballs that cannot be hit.

Eventually, after Casey is beaned by a ball and given a physical examination, the National League finds out and rules that Casey must be taken off the team because he is not human. Dr. Stillman then installs an artificial heart for Casey.

However, due to his new heart, Casey now possesses human emotions. He refuses to throw his fast balls anymore, saying that he feels empathy with the batter and does not want to ruin the batter's career by striking him out, and quits baseball to become a social worker. With the team sure to fold soon, Dr. Stillman gives McGarry Casey's blueprints as a souvenir. Glancing at them, McGarry suddenly has an idea, and runs after Dr. Stillman to tell him. Rumors later surface intimating that McGarry has used the blueprints to build a world-champion team of Casey robots on the West Coast.

== Closing narration ==
Once upon a time, there was a major league baseball team called the Hoboken Zephyrs, who, during the last year of their existence, wound up in last place and shortly thererafter wound up in oblivion. There's a rumor, unsubstantiated, of course, that a manager named McGarry took them to the West Coast and wound up with several pennants and a couple of world championships. This team had a pitching staff that made history. Of course, none of them smiled very much, but it happens to be a fact that they pitched like nothing human. And if you're interested as to where these gentlemen came from, you might check under 'B' for Baseball - in The Twilight Zone.

== Production ==
According to The Twilight Zone: Unlocking the Door to a Television Classic by Martin Grams, the entire production was originally filmed with Paul Douglas in the manager role (Douglas previously played a baseball team manager in the 1951 film Angels in the Outfield). On Friday, September 11, 1959, the day after the episode finished shooting, Douglas died. Douglas had been, unbeknownst to anyone, suffering from an incipient coronary during the production; his performance was adversely affected as, on film, Douglas appeared mottled and out-of-breath.

Writer and executive producer Rod Serling felt that the circumstances of Douglas' death cast a pall over what was supposed to be a light-hearted comedic episode, and decided that a re-shoot was necessary. CBS refused to finance any re-shooting, so consequently, virtually the entire production was reshot at the expense of Rod Serling's Cayuga Productions with Jack Warden in the team manager's role. The other roles were not recast, and as much footage as possible was used from the original filming, including (in the episode's final shot) a scene in which Douglas is seen in the distance, with his back to the camera, as the manager. Original director Alvin Ganzer was not available for the re-shoot, so Robert Parrish was brought in to complete shooting; both are credited as directors on the finished episode.

In Serling's original first-draft script (and in his short-story adaptation that appeared in the 1960 anthology, Stories from The Twilight Zone), the team was supposed to have been the Brooklyn Dodgers (their stadium in the original story was "Tebbet's Field"), who, like the fictitious "Hoboken Zephyrs", moved west in 1958 to become the Los Angeles Dodgers. The closing narration refers to the original draft: at the time of broadcast, the Dodgers had beaten the Chicago White Sox to win the previous year's World Series, doing so with a dominant pitching staff featuring Don Drysdale, Johnny Podres and a young Sandy Koufax.

The baseball scenes were filmed at the Los Angeles version of Wrigley Field, an often-used venue for Hollywood films featuring baseball scenes. The TV series Home Run Derby was also filmed at Wrigley, and also aired that summer of 1960. The Wrigley footage, with the stands empty, was supplemented by brief clips of stock-footage crowd scenes, from the Polo Grounds and Fenway Park. Though the stadium is supposed to be in Hoboken, the filming location in southern California means that palm trees can be glimpsed beyond the outfield fence in at least one shot.
