= Man of the House (1995 film) =

1995 film directed by James Orr

- Theatrical release poster
- Directed by: James Orr
- Screenplay by: James Orr; Jim Cruickshank
- Story by: David E. Peckinpah; Richard Jefferies
- Produced by: Bonnie Bruckheimer; Marty Katz
- Starring: Chevy Chase; Farrah Fawcett; Jonathan Taylor Thomas; George Wendt
- Cinematography: Jamie Anderson
- Edited by: Harry Keramidas
- Music by: Mark Mancina
- Production companies: Walt Disney Pictures; All Girl Productions; Orr & Cruickshank Productions
- Distributed by: Buena Vista Pictures Distribution
- Release date: March 3, 1995
- Running time: 96 minutes
- Country: United States
- Language: English
- Budget: $22 million
- Box office: $40 million

Man of the House is a 1995 American comedy film starring Chevy Chase, Farrah Fawcett, Jonathan Taylor Thomas (in his debut live action film appearance) and George Wendt. The film is about a boy (Thomas) who must come to terms with his potential stepfather (Chase), a well-meaning lawyer who is unknowingly the subject of a manhunt by relatives of a man he helped land in prison. It was shot in Los Angeles, California and Vancouver, British Columbia, Canada.

The film was generally not well received by film critics and grossed only $40 million in revenue.

== Plot ==
Six-year-old Ben Archer watches silently as his father starts up his car and drives away with his secretary, and they both offer only a wave out the window in parting. His mother, Sandy, can only watch heartbroken from the window of their house as her ex-husband leaves them. Ben's father promised to visit him, yet never comes back. They are both upset, but they decide to have a fresh start, so they move into a loft apartment in downtown Seattle to begin a new life with just the two of them. Sandy makes creative efforts to turn it into a home for them. They gradually overcome his father leaving and foster a very close bond with important rituals and routines, including making a collage with beach debris. Sandy develops an interest in dating, but her suitors never fit well and do not last long, which allows Ben's ideal relationship with his mother to resume. Five years later, however, Sandy decides she is ready for marriage again, and begins seriously dating U.S. Federal Prosecutor, Attorney Jack Sturges.

In Federal Court, Jack successfully prosecutes mobster Frank Renda for drug trafficking. Before being sentenced to fifty years in federal prison at Sheridan, the elderly Frank makes a veiled threat of revenge towards Jack. After court is adjourned, Frank's son Joey rephrases the threat in a more intimidating manner, but Jack does not back down and then dismisses him entirely. Sandy and Jack discuss his moving in, of which eleven-year-old Ben does not approve despite his mother's reassurance that it is only a trial period. Jack is confident he can win him over, telling Sandy he has read every book on stepparenting he could find.

The transition does not go smoothly for Ben, as he resentfully feels he is the one suffering all of the adjustments and that his mother is making the same mistake she made with his father, so he resorts to ensuring Jack is as uncomfortable and unwelcome as possible. Jack tries taking the subterfuge in stride, not realizing it is deliberate, but his efforts to connect with the boy are met with irritation as he only succeeds in disrupting Ben's customary lifestyle. After meeting a boy named Norman Bronski at school, Ben feigns interest in joining the Indian Guides – a YMCA father son program – with Jack to secretly drive a wedge between them and get rid of him. Despite reluctance, Jack goes along with it at Sandy's insistence, and he and Ben join Norman's "tribe", the Minotauks. Neither of them like the club, but Ben manages to effectively humiliate Jack at meetings.

Once it starts interfering with his job, Jack tells Sandy he can no longer be part of it. Ben fakes distress by this and compares it to his father leaving to turn Sandy against her boyfriend. Jack goes to apologize, and instead overhears Ben bragging about everything over the phone to his best friend Monroe. Although he is disheartened by this revelation, Jack does not tell Sandy about it and instead seeks advice from high school woodshop teacher and fellow stepfather Chet Bronski, who is the Indian Guides chief. Chet tells Jack the reason why Ben is doing this is because he is afraid Jack will take his mother away from him. Chet was like Jack himself — Norman and Chet never got along, but the Indian Guides help them have a great relationship. Jack decides that this is what he will do. He then redoubles his efforts to bond with Ben by improving the Indian Guides. Meanwhile, Ben starts to connect with Norman and they become close friends after a sleepover. Just as Jack starts to strengthen his relationship with Ben, Joey's threat catches up with him: the brakes on his Ford Explorer are cut, but Jack manages to avoid a more serious crash and ends up in Puget Sound. This causes him to miss an important canoe trip he promised to attend. Ben, having finally opened up, is genuinely hurt by this perceived betrayal to the point of tears, as it brings up bad memories of his father's broken promises.

Ben returns home at the same time Jack does, he tells Ben that he had car trouble and was unable to get to the canoe trip on time and that he's sorry, but then Jack tells Ben that Chet had planned a camping trip for the Indian Guides on the 4th of July and that Jack promises Ben that they will go on the trip no matter what happens. Jack conceals the truth and refuses his boss Bob's order to transfer to Portland, Oregon so he can redeem himself to go camping. His initial attempts are unsuccessful, and he feels the situation is hopeless. Joey and his two goons, Murray and Tony, are then discovered in the woods with rifles by Ben planning to kill Jack, and Jack confesses the truth behind his "car trouble" which garners Ben's forgiveness and understanding as he now knows Jack did not intentionally betray his trust like his father. Jack sends the rest of the Indian Guides to the ranger station while he and Ben (who returned to help him) improvise to distract the criminals.

The pair is eventually cornered in front of an abandoned mine shaft entrance rigged with dynamite, until they are rescued by the Minotauks and the crooks are disabled. Ben is impressed and finally gives his approval of Jack and consents to Jack proposing to Sandy. The two complete the beach collage, which symbolizes that the three of them are finally whole as a family. Jack and Sandy marry, with the Minotauks in attendance at the wedding, and despite nothing being perfect, all are happy.

== Cast ==
- Chevy Chase as Jack Sturges (Squatting Dog)
- Farrah Fawcett as Sandy Archer, Jack's love interest later wife
- Jonathan Taylor Thomas as Ben Archer, Sandy's son (Little Wing)
- * Jimmy Baker as Young Ben Archer
- David Shiner as Lloyd Small (Silent Thunder)
- George Wendt as Chet Bronski (Chief Running Horse)
- Peter Appel as Tony, Joey's henchman
- Richard Foronjy as Murray, Joey's other henchman
- Art LaFleur as Red Sweeney (Silver Fox)
- Richard Portnow as Joey Renda, Jack's rival
- Zachary Browne as Norman Bronski, Chet's son (Dark Eagle)
- Spencer Vrooman as Darryl Small, Lloyd's son
- Chris Miranda as Hank Sweeney, Red's son
- Nicholas Garrett as Monroe Hill
- Ron Canada as Bob Younger
- George Grief as Frank Renda

== Soundtrack ==
A soundtrack by Walt Disney Records was scheduled to coincide with the film's release, but never came to fruition due to the fact Disney could not procure the rights to several of the songs for a soundtrack release, most notably C+C Music Factory's "Gonna Make You Sweat" and Enigma's "Return to Innocence". Despite this, "Hit the Road Jack", a song by R&B artist Percy Mayfield, was cleared for release on the soundtrack that, ultimately, never made it to market.

The soundtrack was advertised on promotional materials from mid 1994 to the beginning of 1995. "Return to Innocence (Short Version)" was used in Jack and Sandy's wedding during the film, "Return to Innocence (Single Version)" was to be used on the unreleased Man of the House soundtrack, and "Return to Innocence (380 Midnight Mix)" was used in the two Man of the House promo television spots.

== Reception ==
The film was panned by critics, and has a rating of 13% on Rotten Tomatoes, based on 15 reviews.

Entertainment Weekly critic Owen Gleiberman awarded the film a D+, describing it as a "a lethargic family comedy" and castigating Chase's acting abilities, remarking that "as a performer, Chase hasn't lost his air of foggy detachment; he still delivers his lines as if he were reading them off a teleprompter mounted somewhere in the next room. This time, though, he attempts to pass off his deadpan quizzicality as concern. It's an eerie sight. I mean, does anyone really want to watch Chevy Chase try to be heartwarming? He had more conviction reporting the death of Franco."

Also not a fan of the acting in the film was The Baltimore Sun's Stephen Hunter, who remarked that "the performances, if anything, lower the quality of the film. Chase seems caught in despair between Old Self (clumsy goofball who destroys things) and New Self (sensitive actor), and so he comes across as No Self. He's so muted he's hardly there. Jonathan Taylor Thomas is tiresomely obnoxious. Fawcett has very little to do except appear wise and concerned. George Wendt, as one of the Indian wannabes, is occasionally funny, as is the movie. Very occasionally."

Stephen Holden of The New York Times had a more favorable opinion of Taylor's performance, but opined that "Man of the House, the newest slick confection from the Disney cookie-cutter school of family comedies, follows the formula of many of its predecessors in trying to be two different movies at once. The better of the two is a warm-hearted comedy about an embittered child of divorce who makes his future step father jumps through hoops before accepting him into the family. Attached to this story is a perfunctory Home Alone offshoot in which slapstick thugs are trounced and humiliated by clever children."

Walter Addiego of the San Francisco Examiner awarded the film a one-and-a-half star rating out of four, and called it a "feeble Disney comedy [that] mixes a ludicrous tale of bonding between a youngster and his mother's new boyfriend with heavy doses of witless joshing."

Despite the poor critical reception, audiences polled by CinemaScore had a slightly more favorable view of the film, which they gave an average grade of "B+" on an A+ to F scale.

=== Box office ===
The film did moderately well at the box office, grossing about $40 million domestically. The film was released in the United Kingdom on June 9, 1995.

=== Home media ===
The film was first released on VHS on August 8, 1995, then on DVD on March 4, 2003. The film was released on Blu-Ray on July 13, 2021. It is also included on Disney's streaming service, Disney+.
