= Trudy Young =

Canadian actress

- Born: 1 January 1950 (age 76); Ontario, Canada
- Education: Alderwood Collegiate Institute
- Occupation: Actress
- Years active: 1963–1982
- Known for: Melanie; Homer

Trudy Young (born 1 January 1950) is a Canadian actress.

Born in Ontario, Canada, her career began in 1963 with appearances on CBC's Time of Your Life. She became a regular host of Razzle Dazzle in 1965 while attending school at Alderwood Collegiate Institute.

She appeared in films throughout the 1970s and 1980s such as Face-Off (1971). In 1979, she was hired to supply the voice of the groupie on the track "One of My Turns" from Pink Floyd's eleventh studio album The Wall. She was nominated as best supporting actress in the 4th Genie Awards for her role in the film Melanie (1982), which was her last known acting credit.

== Filmography ==
=== Feature films ===
Year	Title	Role	Notes
1970	Homer	Sally	
1971	Face-Off	Sherri Lee Nelson	
1971	The Reincarnate	Ruthie	
1977	Age of Innocence	Clarissa	Also titled as "Rag Time Summer"
1979	Running	Pregnant Woman	
1981	The Last Chase	Mrs. Hart	
1982	Melanie	Ronda	

=== Television series ===
Year	Title	Role	Notes
1963-64	Time of Your Life	Wilma	Episode: "The Mystery at Loon Lake Lodge"
1964-66	Razzle Dazzle	co-host	
1965	The Forest Rangers	Wilhelmina	Episode: "Willie and Starlight"
1967	Barney Boomer	Trudy	Episode: "Almost a Poet"
1968	Festival	Anne Denning	Episode: "The Write-off"
1969-70	Strange Paradise	Susan/Suzanne	36 episodes
1971	The Frog Prince	Princess Melora	
1971-73	Alphabet Soup		
1972	George	Helga	
1973	The Starlost	Lethe	Episode: "And Only Man Is Vile"
1976-77	The David Steinberg Show	Margie	

== Post-career ==
Young retired from acting in 1982 and is now living in Oshawa, Ontario. In August 2010, she underwent a second back surgery for a chronic back ailment that had worsened as the result of two car accidents.

== Awards and nominations ==
Year	Award	Category	Nominated work	Notes
1983	4th Genie Awards	Canadian Screen Award for Best Supporting Actress	Melanie	Nominated
