= Age of Innocence (1977 film) =

1977 Canadian film by Alan Bridges

- Poster
- Directed by: Alan Bridges
- Written by: Ratch Wallace
- Produced by: Deanne Judson; George Willoughby
- Starring: David Warner; Honor Blackman; Trudy Young; Lois Maxwell
- Cinematography: Brian West
- Edited by: Michael MacLaverty
- Music by: Max Urban
- Production companies: Judson Pictures Incorporated; The Rank Organisation
- Distributed by: J. Arthur Rank Film Distributors; Danton Films
- Release date: 28 April 1977
- Running time: 101 minutes
- Countries: Canada; United Kingdom
- Language: English
- Budget: US$850,000

Age of Innocence, also known as Ragtime Summer, is a 1977 Canadian-British film directed by Alan Bridges and starring David Warner, Honor Blackman and Trudy Young. It is not based on the novel, The Age of Innocence.

== Plot ==
In 1921 Canada, a young British man, Henry Buchanan, is a teacher at a local boys' school but his pacifist views, and his record as a conscientious objector during World War I, stir up controversy.

== Cast ==
- David Warner as Henry Buchanan
- Honor Blackman as Mrs. Boswell
- Trudy Young as Clarissa
- Lois Maxwell as Mrs. Hogarth
- Cec Linder as Dr. Hogarth

== Production ==
The film was a Canadian-British co production from a Canadian writer and British director. Investors included the Canadian Film Development Corporation, Odeon Theatres (Canada), Rank Film Distributors and investors from both countries.

Filmed on 35 mm in July and August 1976. Filming locations included Lang Pioneer Village Museum, Burleigh Falls, Lakefield College School, and Lakefield, Ontario.

== Reception ==
In Directors in British and Irish Cinema: A Reference Companion (2006), Robert Murphy said that the film explored romantic sensibility and sexual repression.

Filmink called the film " a love story with Honor Blackman and… David Warner (who was going to see that? No one as it turned out)."
