= James Orr (filmmaker) =

Canadian film director, producer and screenwriter

James Joseph Orr
- Born: March 23, 1953 (age 72); Noranda, Quebec
- Education: AFI Conservatory
- Occupations: Director; screenwriter; producer; film editor

James Joseph Orr (born March 23, 1953) is a Canadian writer, director and producer of motion pictures. Orr's screenplay credits include Three Men and a Baby, Tough Guys and Sister Act 2: Back in the Habit, whilst his director credits include Mr. Destiny and Man of the House.

== Biography ==
Born in Noranda, Quebec in 1953, he grew up in Toronto, Ontario. He attended the Carleton School of Journalism at Carleton University in Ottawa, Ontario, Canada, where he became the editor of The Charlatan student newspaper during the 1973–1974 term. Orr then went to the undergraduate film school at York University in Toronto, and in 1977 he became the first Canadian to be accepted as a Director Fellow in the AFI Conservatory of the American Film Institute in Los Angeles.

In the mid-1980s, Orr had a relationship with actress Jamie Rose. They married in 1986, but later divorced in 1988.

From 1997 to 1998, Orr had a relationship with actress Farrah Fawcett, who had co-starred with Chevy Chase and Jonathan Taylor Thomas in Man of the House, a film that he wrote and directed. The relationship ended when Orr was arrested, charged, and later convicted of beating Fawcett during a 1998 fight.

Since the 1980s, Orr has been an avid wine collector and has participated in several wine auctions. This interest proved useful when, in September 2010, wine critic James Suckling announced the launch of his new video-based website featuring content taped in locations across the world, created in collaboration with Orr.

Orr has also indulged his passion for cigars by writing and directing the low-budget feature Blowing Smoke, as well as making a documentary on the Fuente Family called The Fuente Family: An American Dream, and a documentary on Cuban cigars called Cigars: The Heart and Soul of Cuba.

== Filmography ==
James Orr filmography
| Year | Film | Director | Writer | Screenplay | Producer | Executive Producer | Editor | Cinematographer | Story consultant |
|---|---|---|---|---|---|---|---|---|---|
| 1982 | Raising the Mary Rose: Preserving A Moment in Time | ✓ | ✓ | | | | | | ✓ |
| 1985 | Breaking All the Rules | ✓ | | | | | | | ✓ |
| 1986 | Tough Guys | | ✓ | | | | | | |
| 1986 | Witchfire | | ✓ (Note: credited as James R. Orr) | | ✓ | | | | |
| 1987 | They Still Call Me Bruce | ✓ | ✓ | | ✓ | | | | |
| 1987 | Young Harry Houdini (Note: episode in The Wonderful World of Disney—received 1987 Emmy nomination for Outstanding Children's Program) | ✓ | ✓ | | ✓ | | | | |
| 1987 | Three Men and a Baby | | | ✓ | | | | | |
| 1988 | 14 Going on 30 | | ✓ | | | ✓ | | | |
| 1990 | Mr. Destiny | ✓ | ✓ | | ✓ | | | | |
| 1991 | Father of the Bride | | | | | ✓ | | | |
| 1993 | Sister Act 2: Back in the Habit | | ✓ | | | | | | |
| 1994 | Love on the Run | | ✓ | | | | | | |
| 1995 | It Takes Two | | | | ✓ | | | | |
| 1995 | Father of the Bride Part II | | | | | ✓ (Note: co-executive producer) | | | |
| 1995 | Man of the House | ✓ | | ✓ | | | | | |
| 2004 | Blowing Smoke | ✓ | ✓ | | | | ✓ | | |
| 2007 | Christmas in Wonderland | ✓ | ✓ | | | | | | |
| 2010 | The Night Before the Night Before Christmas | ✓ | ✓ | | | ✓ | | | |
| 2011 | My Future Boyfriend | | ✓ | | | ✓ | | | |
| 2011 | Cigars: The Heart and Soul of Cuba | ✓ | ✓ | | | | ✓ | ✓ | |
| 2013 | Cannubi: A Vineyard Kissed by God | ✓ | ✓ | | | | | | |
| 2016 | A Change of Heart | | ✓ | | | | | | |
