= Danger Bay =

Canadian television series

- Danger Bay opening titles
- Genre: Adventure
- Created by: Peter Dixon; Paul Saltzman
- Starring: Donnelly Rhodes; Susan Walden; Christopher Crabb; Ocean Hellman; Hagan Beggs; Michele B. Chan
- Composer: Don Gillis
- Country of origin: Canada
- Original language: English
- No. of seasons: 6
- No. of episodes: 123 (list of episodes)

Production
- Executive producer: Paul Saltzman
- Production location: Vancouver, British Columbia
- Editors: Pia Di Ciaula, Stephen Lawrence
- Running time: 30 min.

Original release
- Network: CBC
- Release: 8 October 1984 – 5 March 1990

Danger Bay is a Canadian television series, produced in Vancouver, with first-run episodes broadcast on CBC Television in Canada and The Disney Channel in the United States premiering October 8, 1984. Reruns of the show continued on The Disney Channel until 1996. A total of 123 installments were filmed between 1984 and 1990. The series was perceived as wholesome, exciting fare for older children and adolescents, and continued to be seen through the 1990s in many countries worldwide.

The series followed the exploits of the Roberts family: marine veterinarian Grant "Doc" Roberts and his children, Nicole and Jonah. Nearly every 30-minute episode featured the Vancouver Aquarium. Most episodes focused on environmental issues such as pollution, wildlife endangerment, and forest preservation.

The series was also broadcast in 68 countries such as Gibraltar (Danger Bay), Bulgaria (Опасният Залив), Ukraine (Затока Небезпеки), Poland (Niebezpieczna zatoka), Czechoslovakia (Nebezpečný záliv, with Slovak dubbing), Iceland (Háskaslóðir, subtitled on state TV channel RUV), Cuba (Bahía Peligro), Trinidad & Tobago, Estonia (Ohtude Laht, subtitled), Finland (Vaarojen Lahti, subtitled), Sweden (Äventyr i bukten, subtitled on state TV), Germany (Abenteuer in Vancouver), The Netherlands (Dutch subtitles), Belgium (Avonturenbaai), Indonesia (Danger Bay), Iran (گارد ساحلی), Iraq (ساحل المخاطر), France (Cap Danger) South Africa (Danger Bay), India (Danger Bay), Spain (Bahía Peligrosa), Macedonia („Опасниот Залив“) and in Venezuela (Bahía Peligro) for television channel Televen.

== Cast ==
- Donnelly Rhodes as Dr. Grant "Doc" Roberts
- Susan Walden as J. L. Duval
- Christopher Crabb as Jonah Roberts
- Ocean Hellman as Nicole Roberts
- Hagan Beggs as Dr. George Dunbar
- Michele B. Chan as Dr. Donna Chen
- Deborah Wakeham as Joyce Carter
- Barbara Russell as Marta Larsen

== Streaming ==
In 2018 the entire series was made available online on the Canada Media Fund's Encore+ YouTube channel. In 2022 the service was discontinued and all episodes were removed.
