= Breaking All the Rules (film) =

- Theatrical release poster
- Directed by: James Orr
- Screenplay by: James Orr; James Cruickshank
- Story by: Rafal Zielinski; Edith Rey
- Produced by: Peter Kroonenburg; David J. Patterson
- Starring: Carl Marotte; Thor Bishopric; Carolyn Dunn; Rachel Hayward
- Cinematography: René Verzier
- Edited by: Nick Rotundo
- Music by: Paul Zaza
- Production company: Filmline
- Distributed by: New World Pictures
- Release date: April 1985
- Running time: 93 minutes
- Countries: Canada; United States
- Language: English
- Budget: $2,032,000 (estimated)

Breaking All the Rules is a 1985 American-Canadian comedy film directed by James Orr.

The film deals with a part-time employee in an amusement park. He is unwittingly connected to a stolen diamond hidden in his workplace, and with the attempts of the thieves to retrieve it.

== Plot ==
Jack spends his summer doing a part-time job in an amusement park. Meanwhile, an expensive diamond is stolen by three thieves. In order to escape from the police, the thieves hide the diamond inside a fluffy toy at the park. However, Jack's fingerprints were left at the crime scene unintentionally.

It is the last day of summer vacation, so Jack decides to hang out with his best friend David. On their way to the park, they meet two cute girls: Debbie and Angie. The four have a good time in the park, and Jack and David both fall in love with the girls, but they don't know that the three thieves have come back to the park and plan to take their diamond back.

== Cast ==
- Carl Marotte as Jack
- Thor Bishopric as David
- Carolyn Dunn as Debbie
- Rachel Hayward as Angie
- Michael Rudder as Harry
- Vlasta Vrana as Detective
- Michele Scarabelli as David's stepmother

== Production ==
The film was written by Rafal Zielinski who called it "a personal project". He arranged finance from New World but says "then there was a regime change at the studio, and behind my back they hired another writer and rewrote the script. They only told me this one week before shooting, and said that if I didn’t like it, then they’ll get this new screenwriter to direct it as well. I freaked out. It was a gorgeous, sensitive, coming-of-age movie, but they had turned it into some silly comedy. I was so destroyed by this. I felt I’d been, well, raped."
