= Rex Bromfield =

Canadian film, retired television director and writer

- Born: Toronto, Ontario, Canada
- Occupations: Television director, writer
- Relatives: Lois Bromfield (sister); Valri Bromfield (sister)

Rex Bromfield is a Canadian film, retired television director and writer. He is best known for his 1982 film Melanie, which garnered seven Genie Award nominations at the 4th Genie Awards in 1983, including a nod for Bromfield as Best Director.

He has directed five feature films and numerous episodes of Canadian television series. He subsequently left the film business to start a software company, but in 2004 he briefly returned to film as co-writer with Jackson Davies of the screenplay for The Wild Guys. He has since published several works of fiction as ebooks on Smashwords.

He is the brother of comedians Valri Bromfield and Lois Bromfield who appeared in the 1990s, Bromfield with Chris Aable in her first television interview, on Hollywood Today.

== Filmography ==
=== Films ===
- Love at First Sight (1976)
- Tulips (1981)
- Melanie (1982)
- Home Is Where the Hart Is (1987)
- Café Romeo (1992)
- The Wild Guys (2004)

=== Television ===
- Danger Bay (1988–89, 4 episodes)
- The Beachcombers (1988–89, 6 episodes)
- Max Glick (1990)
- The Odyssey (1993–94, 4 episodes)
