= Michael Conway Baker =

Canadian composer (1937–2025)

Michael Conway Baker (March 13, 1937 – December 1, 2025) was an American-Canadian composer and music teacher. He became a Canadian citizen in 1970 and lived for the last forty years of his life in North Vancouver.

== Life and career ==
Baker was born in West Palm Beach, Florida, and taught himself basic music theory as a child. His father is comedian Phil Baker. Baker moved to Vancouver, British Columbia, in 1958. Subsequently, Baker studied music composition at the University of British Columbia with Jean Coulthard and Elliot Weisgarber. After graduating with a Bachelor of Music degree in 1966, he eventually pursued graduate studies at Western Washington University, where he earned a Master of Music in 1972.

Baker has composed numerous scores for film and television as well as over 150 concert works. He has received three Genie Awards (for Nails, The Grey Fox, and John and the Missus), one Juno Award for Classical Composition of the Year (for his Concerto For Piano and Chamber Orchestra), and an ACTRA Award for Best Television Score (for A Planet for the Taking). He has composed for the National Ballet of Canada, Expo 86 in Vancouver, and two episodes of Road to Avonlea. In 1997, Baker was awarded the Order of British Columbia. He received a Queen Elizabeth II Golden Jubilee Medal in 2003. Baker was inducted into the BC Entertainment Hall of Fame in November 2006.

He is known for having composed the Vancouver Variations, used as the theme music for the CBC Music morning request program Here's to You. He wrote the music for Dorothy Hamill's Ice Capades full-length ice ballet Cinderella: Frozen in Time.

He was the composer-in-residence for the Vancouver School Board and a sessional lecturer at the University of British Columbia.

Baker spent seventeen years as an elementary school teacher and lives in North Vancouver. His wife Penny Anne Baker, who wrote lyrics for several of his works, died in 2018.

Baker died on December 1, 2025, at the age of 88.
