= Loose Cannons (1990 film) =

1990 film by Bob Clark

- Theatrical release poster
- Directed by: Bob Clark
- Written by: Richard Christian Matheson; Richard Matheson; Bob Clark
- Produced by: Aaron Spelling; Alan Griesman
- Starring: Gene Hackman; Dan Aykroyd; Dom DeLuise; Ronny Cox
- Cinematography: Reginald H. Morris
- Edited by: Stan Cole
- Music by: Paul Zaza
- Distributed by: Tri-Star Pictures
- Release date: February 9, 1990
- Running time: 94 minutes
- Country: United States
- Language: English
- Budget: $15 million
- Box office: $5.5 million

Loose Cannons is a 1990 American action comedy film written by Richard Matheson, Richard Christian Matheson and Bob Clark, who also directed the film. The film stars Gene Hackman as hard-nosed cop Mac Stern who is teamed up with Ellis Fielding, a detective with multiple personality disorder, played by Dan Aykroyd, to uncover a long-lost Nazi sex tape, featuring Adolf Hitler, which would jeopardize the political future of the West German chancellor-elect Kurt Von Metz. The theme song "Loose Cannons" features vocals by Katey Sagal and Aykroyd.

Upon release by Tri-Star Pictures on February 9, 1990, the film was a critical and financial bomb, bringing in only $5.5 million worldwide on a $15 million budget.

== Plot ==
A film is found that features German officer Kurt Von Metz helping Adolf Hitler commit suicide. Years later, Von Metz, running for chancellor of West Germany, arranges for anyone who has seen the film to be murdered. The killings take place in the Washington D.C. area, and Metropolitan Police officers MacArthur "Mac" Stern and Ellis Fielding are sent to investigate the crimes.

Ellis suffers from a dissociative identity disorder stemming from a disastrous undercover drug sting, which is aggravated when he is confronted with violence. This results in several episodes where he blacks out and assumes the personalities of popular culture characters, including Popeye, Captain James T. Kirk and the Road Runner.

Mac and Ellis attempt to track down the film through pornographer Harry "The Hippo" Gutterman, who directs them to New York City. They must evade an FBI team led by Bob Smiley that is shielding Von Metz from embarrassment by intercepting the film before it goes public. At Washington's Union Station, Mac and Ellis trick Smiley's team into boarding their intended New York-bound train, then jump off and onto a Cleveland train instead. Mac detects another undercover team that has been trailing them, led by Rebecca "Riva" Lohengrin, a Mossad agent assigned to the Israeli embassy. Mac, Ellis and Gutterman survive a helicopter attack by Nazi sympathizers, jump into a river, and continue on to New York. Ellis confides in Mac his fear that another disassociative episode could prove irreversible, and wishes to return to the Benedictine Monks who looked after him during his recovery. Mac reiterates his faith in Ellis and tells him to focus on the present.

Mac finds the film at Grand Central Terminal in New York, survives an exchange of gunfire with more Nazis, and delivers the film to Riva. It is screened that same evening during a speech by Von Metz.

Mac, Ellis and Gutterman recuperate from gunshot wounds in the same hospital. Mac jokes about converting to Judaism in order to move to Israel to join the Mossad but is uncomfortable about circumcision. Ellis points out they work together so well as partners because Mac is crazier than he is.

== Cast ==
- Gene Hackman as Detective MacArthur "Mac" Stern
- Dan Aykroyd as Detective Ellis Fielding
- Dom DeLuise as Harry "The Hippo" Gutterman
- Ronny Cox as FBI Agent Bob Smiley
- Nancy Travis as Mossad Agent Rebecca "Riva" Lowengrin
- Paul Koslo as Grimmer
- Dick O'Neill as Captain
- Robert Prosky as Kurt Von Metz
- Jan Triska as Steckler
- Leon Rippy as Weskit
- Robert Elliott as Monseigner
- David Alan Grier as Drummond
- S. Epatha Merkerson as Officer Rachel
- George P. Wilbur as Grimmer's Man
- John Finn as Cop
- Reg E. Cathey as Willie
- Herb Armstrong as "Cheshire Cat"
- Robert Dickman as "White Rabbit"
- Brad Greenquist as Embassy Officer

== Production ==
J. T. Walsh was originally cast as Grimmer, completing two days of filming, before Dan Aykroyd learned he had been in the cast of the John Belushi biopic Wired. He reportedly had Walsh fired over his participation in the other film, which Aykroyd had opposed.

== Reception ==
=== Box office ===
The film was released on February 9, 1990 and grossed $2,239,830 on its opening weekend, ranking #5 at the box office. Its widest release was 1,214 theaters. It only played in cinemas for two weeks, where it grossed $5,585,154 worldwide. On a budget of $15 million, the film ended up a box office flop.

=== Critical response ===
Loose Cannons received universally negative reviews from critics, and has been declared one of the worst films in the early 1990s. It has a rare 0% rating on Rotten Tomatoes based on 19 reviews. Audiences surveyed by CinemaScore gave the film a grade "B−" on scale of A to F.

Vincent Canby, in his review for The New York Times, stated: "Mr. Hackman and Mr. Aykroyd deserve much better. They really do. Each gives a thoroughly professional performance that is consistently undercut by the direction of Mr. Clark."

Variety stated that "Dan Aykroyd's dexterous multipersonality schtick is the only redeeming feature of this chase-heavy comedy." Hal Hinson commented that "Hackman mostly just stands around watching Aykroyd run through his exertions with the look of a man who has something unspeakable on the sole of his shoe" in his review for The Washington Post. Gene Siskel and Roger Ebert gave the film a "Two Thumbs Down" vote on At the Movies, and called it "the cop-buddy comedy that hits new lows in an undistinguished field."

In May 2013, Calgary Police investigated after footage from the film was found in a landfill by a worker, who mistook it for evidence of an actual murder. It was later noticed that Aykroyd was in the frame, and the police contacted his agent who, after some searching, stated that it was a section from this movie. TMZ reported that after the incident Aykroyd said, "The movie should have been left in the landfill where it belongs."
