= Hard Feelings (film) =

1982 Canadian drama film

- VHS cover
- Directed by: Daryl Duke
- Written by: John Herzfeld; W.D. Richter
- Based on: Hard Feelings novel by Don Bredes
- Produced by: Harold Greenberg
- Starring: Carl Marotte; Charlayne Woodard; Grand Bush
- Cinematography: Harry Makin
- Edited by: Tony Lower
- Music by: Micky Erbe; Maribeth Solomon
- Production company: Astral Bellevue Pathé
- Distributed by: Astral Films (Canada); 20th Century Fox (US)
- Release date: December 10, 1982
- Running time: 105 minutes
- Country: Canada
- Language: English

Hard Feelings (also known as Hang Tough) is a 1982 Canadian drama film directed by Daryl Duke.

== Overview ==
In 1963, Barnie Margruder is a teenager dealing with school bullies, fighting parents, conflicting feelings about sex, and a bad relationship with his girlfriend. His life changes when he befriends Winona, an African-American girl from the other side of the tracks who gives him a new perspective on his hometown and the world.

== Cast ==
- Carl Marotte as Barnie Margruder
- Charlayne Woodard as Winona Lockhart
- Grand Bush as Latham Lockhart
- Vincent Bufano as Russell Linwood
- Allan Katz as Les Bridgeman
- Lisa Langlois as Barbara Holland
- Sylvia Llewellyn as Mrs. Joan Margruder
- Micheal Donaghue as Mr. Fred Margruder
- Stephanie Miller as Leslie Wolstein
