= Around the Fire =

- Poster
- Directed by: John Jacobsen
- Starring: Devon Sawa; Tara Reid; Colman Domingo
- Release date: 1998
- Running time: 106 minutes
- Country: United States
- Language: English

Around the Fire is a 1998 American drama film directed by John Jacobsen and starring Devon Sawa, Tara Reid, and Colman Domingo. It is Jacobsen's feature directorial debut.

== Plot ==
Simon Harris (played by Devon Sawa), whose Mom has died, does not fit in at his boarding school that his father sends him away too. He befriends the resident stoner, and they go to a music festival and take LSD, then sell LSD. Then he lives in a van, following a band called "Uncle Pants and the Slow Drain" on tour for a while after he graduates, and his friend gets arrested but he does not. Then he takes too much LSD at a concert and freaks out, gets arrested, and ends up in rehab; but it is okay because his dad and he reconcile. Then he finds his hippie girlfriend again at a festival, apologizes, and they sell stir-fry veggies on the lot to make money in a controversial cooking montage. Also there is a scene prior to his freakout where he is eating dinner at his dad's and lying about how he makes money. Mostly because his dad does not think he amounts to anything.

== Cast ==
- Stephen Tobolowsky as Doc
- Lisa Burgett as Lauren
- Charlayne Woodard as Kate
- Colman Domingo as Trace
- Eric Mabius as Andrew
- Tara Reid as Jennifer
- Bill Smitrovich as Matt Harris
- Devon Sawa as Simon Harris

== Home media ==
The film was released on VHS and DVD on August 22, 2000.

== Reception ==
Marjorie Baumgarten of The Austin Chronicle awarded the film two stars out of five.

Nathan Rabin of The A.V. Club gave the film a negative review, calling it "A staggeringly awful youth-gone-bad film".
