= List of American films of 1981 =

This is a list of American films released in 1981.

== Box office ==
The highest-grossing American films released in 1981, by domestic box office gross revenue, are as follows:

Highest-grossing films of 1981
| Rank | Title | Distributor | Domestic gross |
|---|---|---|---|
| 1 | Raiders of the Lost Ark | Paramount | $212,222,025 |
| 2 | On Golden Pond | Universal | $119,285,432 |
| 3 | Superman II | Warner Bros. | $108,185,706 |
| 4 | Arthur | Warner Bros. | $95,461,682 |
| 5 | Stripes | Columbia | $85,297,000 |
| 6 | The Cannonball Run | 20th Century Fox | $72,179,579 |
| 7 | Chariots of Fire | Warner Bros. | $58,972,904 |
| 8 | For Your Eyes Only | United Artists | $54,812,802 |
| 9 | The Four Seasons | Universal | $50,427,646 |
| 10 | Time Bandits | Embassy | $42,365,581 |

== January–March ==
| Opening | | Title | Production company | Cast and crew | Ref. |
|---|---|---|---|---|---|
| J A N U A R Y | 7 | Scream | Cal-Com | Byron Quisenberry (director/screenplay); Pepper Martin, Hank Worden, Ethan Wayne, Alvy Moore, Bobby Diamond, Woody Strode, Ann Bronston, Julie Marine, Nancy St. Marie, Joseph Alvarado, John Nowak, Joe Allaine, Cynthia Faria, Bella Bluck, Dee Cooper, Bob Macgonigal, Gino Difirelli, Gregg Palmer | |
| J A N U A R Y | 14 | Scanners | AVCO Embassy Pictures | David Cronenberg (director/screenplay); Stephen Lack, Jennifer O'Neill, Patrick McGoohan, Lawrence Dane, Michael Ironside, Robert Silverman, Mavor Moore, Anthony Sherwood, Fred Doederlein, Victor Désy, Louis Del Grande, Alex Stevens, William Hope, Christopher Britton, Leon Herbert, Neil Affleck | |
| J A N U A R Y | 28 | Blood Beach | Compass International Pictures / The Jerry Gross Organization | Jeffrey Bloom (director/screenplay); David Huffman, Marianna Hill, Burt Young, John Saxon, Stefan Gierasch, Harriet Medin, Otis Young, Darrell Fetty, Lena Pousette, Mickey Fox, Marleta Giles, Pamela McMyler, Eleanor Zee, Laura Burkett, Jacqueline Randall | |
| J A N U A R Y | 28 | Zombi 2 | Variety Film / The Jerry Gross Organization | Lucio Fulci (director); Elisa Briganti, Dardano Sacchetti (screenplay); Tisa Farrow, Ian McCulloch, Richard Johnson, Al Cliver, Auretta Gay, Stefania D'Amario, Olga Karlatos | |
| J A N U A R Y | 30 | Earthbound | Taft International Pictures | James L. Conway (director); Michael Fisher (screenplay); Burl Ives, Todd Porter, Christopher Connelly, Meredith MacRae, Joseph Campanella, Marc Gilpin, John Schuck, Joey Forman, Stuart Pankin, H. M. Wynant, Doodles Weaver, Anne Lockhart, Mindy Dow, Elissa Leeds, Peter Isacksen, Jesse Bennett, Cindy Bertagnolli, Allen Tatomer, Scottie Anderson | |
| J A N U A R Y | 30 | The Incredible Shrinking Woman | Universal Pictures | Joel Schumacher (director); Jane Wagner (screenplay); Lily Tomlin, Charles Grodin, Ned Beatty, Henry Gibson, Elizabeth Wilson, Mark Blankfield, Maria Smith, Pamela Bellwood, John Glover, Nicholas Hormann, James McMullan, Shelby Balik, Justin Dana, Rick Baker, Frank Welker, Mike Douglas, Dick Wilson, Sally Kirkland, Pat Ast, Marneen Fields | |
| F E B R U A R Y | 6 | Fort Apache, The Bronx | 20th Century Fox / Producers Circle / Time-Life Films | Daniel Petrie (director); Heywood Gould (screenplay); Paul Newman, Ed Asner, Ken Wahl, Danny Aiello, Rachel Ticotin, Pam Grier, Kathleen Beller, Tito Goya, Miguel Piñero, Jaime Tirelli, Clifford David, Sully Boyar, Dominic Chianese, Michael Higgins, Paul Gleason, Randy Jurgensen, Gilbert Lewis, Cleavant Derricks, Reynaldo Medina, Norman Matlock | |
| F E B R U A R Y | 11 | My Bloody Valentine | Paramount Pictures / Canadian Film Development Corporation / Secret Film Company | George Mihalka (director); John Beaird (screenplay); Paul Kelman, Lori Hallier, Neil Affleck, Don Francks, Cynthia Dale, Alf Humphreys, Keith Knight, Patricia Hamilton, Terry Waterland, Thomas Kovacs, Helene Udy, Rob Stein, Gina Dick, Larry Reynolds, Jim Murchison, Carl Marotte, Jack Van Evera, Peter Cowper | |
| F E B R U A R Y | 11 | Sphinx | Orion Pictures / Warner Bros. | Franklin J. Schaffner (director); John Byrum (screenplay); Lesley-Anne Down, Frank Langella, Maurice Ronet, John Gielgud, Vic Tablian, Martin Benson, John Rhys-Davies, Nadim Sawalha, Tutte Lemkow, Saeed Jaffrey, Eileen Way, William Hootkins, James Cossins, Victoria Tennant, Behrouz Vossoughi | |
| F E B R U A R Y | 13 | American Pop | Columbia Pictures / Bakshi Productions | Ralph Bakshi (director); Ronni Kern (screenplay); Ron Thompson, Lisa Jane Persky, Jeffrey Lippa, Marya Small, Beatrice Colen, Frank Dekova, Roz Kelly, Richard Moll, Joey Camen, Elsa Raven, Vincent Schiavelli, Leonard Stone, Eric Taslitz, Lynda Wiesmeier, Elya Baskin, Lee Ving, Ralph Bakshi, Richard Singer, Jerry Holland, Hilary Beane, Robert Beecher, Gene Borkan, Ben Frommer, Amy Levitt | |
| F E B R U A R Y | 13 | Charlie Chan and the Curse of the Dragon Queen | American Cinema Productions / Jerry Sherlock Productions | Clive Donner (director); Stan Burns, David Axelrod (screenplay); Peter Ustinov, Lee Grant, Angie Dickinson, Richard Hatch, Brian Keith, Roddy McDowall, Rachel Roberts, Michelle Pfeiffer, Paul Ryan, Johnny Sekka | |
| F E B R U A R Y | 13 | Eyewitness | 20th Century Fox | Peter Yates (director); Steve Tesich (screenplay); William Hurt, Sigourney Weaver, Christopher Plummer, James Woods, Irene Worth, Kenneth McMillan, Pamela Reed, Steven Hill, Morgan Freeman, Alice Drummond, Keone Young | |
| M A R C H | 6 | All Night Long | Universal Pictures | Jean-Claude Tramont (director); W. D. Richter (screenplay); Gene Hackman, Barbra Streisand, Dennis Quaid, Diane Ladd, Kevin Dobson, William Daniels, Hamilton Camp, Terry Kiser, Charles Siebert, Vernee Watson, Annie Girardot, Ann Doran, Raleigh Bond, Jim Nolan, Judy Kerr, Marlyn Gates | |
| M A R C H | 6 | The Devil and Max Devlin | Buena Vista Distribution / Walt Disney Productions | Steven Hilliard Stern (director); Mary Rodgers (screenplay); Elliott Gould, Bill Cosby, Susan Anspach, Adam Rich, Julie Budd, Sonny Shroyer, David Knell, Chuck Shamata, Ronnie Schell, Reggie Nalder | |
| M A R C H | 6 | Maniac | Analysis Film Releasing Corporation / Magnum Motion Pictures Inc. | William Lustig (director); C.A. Rosenberg, Joe Spinell (screenplay); Joe Spinell, Caroline Munro, Gail Lawrence, Tom Savini, Sharon Mitchell, William Lustig, Kelly Piper, Rita Montone, Hyla Marrow, James Brewster, Linda Lee Walter, Tracie Evans, Carol Henry, Neila Bacmeister, Louis Jawitz, Denise Spagnuolo, Billy Spagnuolo, Frank Pesce | |
| M A R C H | 6 | On the Right Track | 20th Century Fox | Lee Philips (director); Avery Buddy, Richard Moses, Tina Pine (screenplay); Gary Coleman, Maureen Stapleton, Norman Fell, Michael Lembeck, Lisa Eilbacher, Bill Russell, Herb Edelman, Nathan Davis, Fern Persons, Mike Genovese, Harry Gorsuch, Page Hannah, Jami Gertz, Chelcie Ross, Mike Bacarella, Jack Wasserman, Arthur Smith, Corin Rogers, George Barrow, David Selburg | |
| M A R C H | 13 | Back Roads | Warner Bros. / CBS Theatrical Films | Martin Ritt (director); Gary DeVore (screenplay); Sally Field, Tommy Lee Jones, David Keith, Michael V. Gazzo, Barbara Babcock, Miriam Colon, M. Emmet Walsh | |
| M A R C H | 13 | The Funhouse | Universal Pictures / Mace Neufeld Productions | Tobe Hooper (director); Larry Block (screenplay); Elizabeth Berridge, Cooper Huckabee, Largo Woodruff, Miles Chapin, Kevin Conway, Sylvia Miles, William Finley, Wayne Doba, Shawn Carson, Rebuka Hoye, Jack McDermott, Jeanne Austin | |
| M A R C H | 13 | Modern Romance | Columbia Pictures | Albert Brooks (director/screenplay); Monica Johnson (screenplay); Albert Brooks, Kathryn Harrold, Bruno Kirby, James L. Brooks, George Kennedy, Albert Henderson | |
| M A R C H | 20 | Amy | Buena Vista Distribution / Walt Disney Productions | Vincent McEveety (director); Noreen Stone (screenplay); Jenny Agutter, Barry Newman, Kathleen Nolan, Chris Robinson, Lou Fant, Margaret O'Brien, Nanette Fabray, Lance LeGault, Lucille Benson, Jonathan Daly, Lonny Chapman, Norman Burton, Ronnie Scribner, Seamon Glass, Brian Frishman, Jane Daly, Dawn Jeffory, Peggy McCay, Len Wayland, Virginia Vincent, Otto Rechenberg, David Hollander, Cory 'Bumper' Yothers, Alban Branton, Michelle Downey, Carson Sipes, Diana Boyd, Flavia Fleischer, David Jacob Weiss, Oscar Arturo Aguilar, Kevin van Wieringen, Nancy Jeris, Randy Morton, Lance Gordon, John Arndt, Rick Foster, Elisha Rapson | |
| M A R C H | 20 | Cutter's Way | United Artists | Ivan Passer (director); Jeffrey Alan Fiskin (screenplay); Jeff Bridges, John Heard, Lisa Eichhorn, Ann Dusenberry, Stephen Elliott, Arthur Rosenberg, Francis X. McCarthy, Nina van Pallandt, Julia Duffy, Billy Drago, Jonathan Terry, Ted White, Patricia Donahue, Paul Thomas | |
| M A R C H | 20 | Omen III: The Final Conflict | 20th Century Fox / Mace Neufeld Productions | Graham Baker (director); Andrew Birkin (screenplay); Sam Neill, Rossano Brazzi, Don Gordon, Lisa Harrow, Barnaby Holm, Leueen Willoughby, Marc Boyle, Milos Kirek, Tommy Duggan, Louis Mahoney, Richard Oldfield, Tony Vogel, Hugh Moxey, Mason Adams, Robert Arden, Ruby Wax, Hazel Court | |
| M A R C H | 20 | The Postman Always Rings Twice | Paramount Pictures / Lorimar Productions / Northstar International | Bob Rafelson (director); David Mamet (screenplay); Jack Nicholson, Jessica Lange, John Colicos, Michael Lerner, John P. Ryan, Anjelica Huston, William Traylor, Ron Flagge, William Newman, Chuck Liddell, Albert Henderson, Christopher Lloyd | |
| M A R C H | 23 | Inseminoid (UK) | Butcher's Film Service / Jupiter Film Productions | Norman J. Warren (director); Nick Maley, Gloria Maley (screenplay); Judy Geeson, Robin Clarke, Jennifer Ashley, Stephanie Beacham, Steven Grives, Barrie Houghton, Rosalind Lloyd, Victoria Tennant, Trevor Thomas, Heather Wright, David Baxt, Dominic Jephcott, John Segal, Kevin O'Shea, Robert Pugh | |
| M A R C H | 27 | Eyes of a Stranger | Warner Bros. / Georgetown Productions Inc. | Ken Wiederhorn (director); Mark Jackson (screenplay); Lauren Tewes, Jennifer Jason Leigh, Luke Halpin, John DiSanti, Peter DuPre, Gwen Lewis, Kitty Lunn, Timothy Hawkins, Ted Richert, Toni Crabtree, Bob Small, Stella Rivera, Dan Fitzgerald, José Bahamande, Rhonda Flynn | |
| M A R C H | 27 | Thief | United Artists | Michael Mann (director/screenplay); James Caan, Tuesday Weld, Robert Prosky, Willie Nelson, Jim Belushi, Dennis Farina, William Petersen, Gavin MacFadyen, Chuck Adamson, Tom Signorelli, Nick Nickeas, W.R. Bill Brown, Norm Tobin, John Santucci, Sam Cirone, Spero Anast, Hal Frank, Patti Ross | |

== April–June ==
| Opening | | Title | Production company | Cast and crew | Ref. |
|---|---|---|---|---|---|
| A P R I L | 3 | Atlantic City | Paramount Pictures / Selta Films / ICC / Cine-Neighbor / Famous Players Ltd. / Canadian Film Development Corporation | Louis Malle (director); John Guare (screenplay); Burt Lancaster, Susan Sarandon, Kate Reid, Robert Joy, Hollis McLaren, Michel Piccoli, Al Waxman, Sean Sullivan, Angus MacInnes, Moses Znaimer, Wallace Shawn, Harvey Atkin, Norma Dell'Agnese, Louis Del Grande, Cec Linder, Sean McCann, Robert Goulet | |
| A P R I L | 3 | Hardly Working | 20th Century Fox | Jerry Lewis (director/screenplay); Michael Janover (screenplay); Jerry Lewis, Susan Oliver, Roger C. Carmel, Deanna Lund, Harold J. Stone, Steve Franken, Buddy Lester, Leonard Stone | |
| A P R I L | 4 | This Is Elvis | Warner Bros. | Malcolm Leo, Andrew Solt (directors/screenplay); Priscilla Presley, Vernon Presley, Gladys Presley, Joe Esposito, Linda Thompson, Ral Donner | |
| A P R I L | 4 | Nighthawks | Universal Pictures / Martin Poll Productions / The Production Company | Bruce Malmuth (director); David Shaber (screenplay); Sylvester Stallone, Billy Dee Williams, Lindsay Wagner, Persis Khambatta, Nigel Davenport, Rutger Hauer, Hilary Thompson, Joe Spinell, Walter Mathews | |
| A P R I L | 10 | Excalibur | Orion Pictures / Warner Bros. Pictures | John Boorman (director/screenplay); Rospo Pallenberg (screenplay); Nigel Terry, Helen Mirren, Nicholas Clay, Cherie Lunghi, Paul Geoffrey, Nicol Williamson, Corin Redgrave, Patrick Stewart, Keith Buckley, Clive Swift, Liam Neeson, Gabriel Byrne, Robert Addie, Charley Boorman, Katrine Boorman, Ciarán Hinds, Niall O'Brien, Kay McLaren, Barbara Byrne | |
| A P R I L | 10 | Going Ape! | Paramount Pictures | Jeremy Joe Kronsberg (director/screenplay); Tony Danza, Stacey Nelkin, Jessica Walter, Danny DeVito, Art Metrano, Frank Sivero, Rick Hurst, Howard Mann, Joseph Maher | |
| A P R I L | 10 | The Howling | Embassy Pictures | Joe Dante (director); John Sayles, Terence H. Winkless (screenplay); Dee Wallace, Patrick Macnee, Dennis Dugan, Christopher Stone, Belinda Balaski, Kevin McCarthy, John Carradine, Slim Pickens, Elisabeth Brooks, Robert Picardo, Noble Willingham, Jim McKrell, Kenneth Tobey, Dick Miller, Meshach Taylor, Margie Impert, James Murtaugh, Don McLeod | |
| A P R I L | 10 | Knightriders | United Film Distribution Company / Laurel Entertainment | George A. Romero (director/screenplay); Ed Harris, John Amplas, Gary Lahti, Tom Savini, Amy Ingersoll, Patricia Tallman, Brother Blue, Ken Foree, Scott Reiniger, Martin Ferrero, Michael P. Moran, Donald Rubinstein, Stephen King, Warner Shook, Randy Kovitz, Harold Wayne Jones, Albert Amerson, Christine Forrest, Greg Besnak, Gary Davis | |
| A P R I L | 17 | Caveman | United Artists / Turman-Foster Company | Carl Gottlieb (director/screenplay); Rudy De Luca (screenplay); Ringo Starr, Barbara Bach, Dennis Quaid, Shelley Long, Jack Gilford, Cork Hubbert, Evan C. Kim, Carl Lumbly, John Matuszak, Avery Schreiber, Richard Moll, Mark King, Paco Morayta, Ed Greenberg, Jack Scalici, Anaís de Melo, Miguel Ángel Fuentes, Gerardo Zepeda, Hector Moreno | |
| A P R I L | 17 | Lion of the Desert | United Film Distribution Company / Falcon International Productions | Moustapha Akkad (director); Hal Craig (screenplay); Anthony Quinn, Oliver Reed, Rod Steiger, Raf Vallone, Irene Papas, John Gielgud, Andrew Keir, Gastone Moschin, Sky du Mont, Robert Brown, Luciano Bartoli, Franco Fantasia, Stefano Patrizi, Adolfo Lastretti, Takis Emmanuel, Rodolfo Bigotti, Eleonora Stathopoulou, Claudio Goro, Giordano Falzoni, Ihab Werfaly | |
| A P R I L | 24 | Cattle Annie and Little Britches | Universal Pictures / Hemdale Film Corporation | Lamont Johnson (director); David Eyre, Robert Ward (screenplay); Burt Lancaster, John Savage, Rod Steiger, Amanda Plummer, Diane Lane, Scott Glenn, Redmond Gleeson, William Russ, Ken Call, Buck Taylor, Roger Cudney Jr., Michael Conrad, John Quade, Perry Lang, Steven Ford, Chad Hastings, Yvette Sweetman | |
| A P R I L | 24 | The Hand | Orion Pictures / Warner Bros. | Oliver Stone (director/screenplay); Michael Caine, Andrea Marcovicci, Annie McEnroe, Bruce McGill, Viveca Lindfors, Rosemary Murphy, Mara Hobel, Pat Corley, Charles Fleischer | |
| A P R I L | 24 | Ms. 45 | Rochelle Films / Navaron Films | Abel Ferrara (director); Nicholas St. John (screenplay); Zöë Tamerlis, Steve Singer, Jack Thibeau, Peter Yellen, Abel Ferrara, Editta Sherman, Albert Sinkys, Darlene Stuto, Helen McGara, Nike Zachmanoglou, Vincent Gruppi, James Albanese | |
| A P R I L | 24 | Night School | Paramount Pictures / Lorimar / Resource Productions | Ken Hughes (director); Ruth Avergon (screenplay); Leonard Mann, Rachel Ward, Drew Snyder, Joseph R. Sicari, Nicholas Cairis, Karen MacDonald, Annette Miller, Bill McCann, Margo Skinner, Kevin Fennessy, Elizabeth Barnitz, Holly Hardman, Meb Boden, Leonard Corman, Belle McDonald, Ed Higgins | |
| A P R I L | 24 | Take This Job and Shove It | Avco Embassy Pictures / Cinema Group Ventures | Gus Trikonis (director); Barry Schneider (screenplay); Robert Hays, Art Carney, Barbara Hershey, David Keith, Tim Thomerson, Martin Mull, Eddie Albert, Penelope Milford, David Allan Coe, Lacy J. Dalton, Royal Dano, Virgil Frye, James Karen, Len Lesser, Suzanne Kent, Joan Prather, George Lindsey, Johnny Paycheck, Charlie Rich, Fran Ryan, Stephan Meyers, Bob Chandler | |
| M A Y | 1 | Friday the 13th Part 2 | Paramount Pictures / Georgetown Productions | Steve Miner (director); Ron Kurz (screenplay); Amy Steel, John Furey, Adrienne King, Steve Daskewisz, Stu Charno, Lauren-Marie Taylor, Marta Kober, Tom McBride, Bill Randolph, Kirsten Baker, Russell Todd, Walt Gorney, Betsy Palmer, Jack Marks, Cliff Cudney, Warrington Gillette | |
| M A Y | 1 | Graduation Day | IFI/Scope III | Herb Freed (director/screenplay); Anne Marisse (screenplay); Christopher George, Patch Mackenzie, Michael Pataki, E. Danny Murphy, E. J. Peaker, Linnea Quigley, Denise Cheshire, Billy Hufsey, Tom Hintnaus, Vanna White, Karen Abbott, Linda Shayne, Carmen Argenziano, Virgil Frye, Richard Balin, Carl Rey, Erica Hope, Beverly Dixon, Hal Bokar | |
| M A Y | 1 | King of the Mountain | Universal Pictures / PolyGram Pictures | Noel Nosseck (director); Leigh Chapman, H.R. Christian (screenplay); Harry Hamlin, Joseph Bottoms, Deborah Van Valkenburgh, Richard Cox, Seymour Cassel, Dennis Hopper | |
| M A Y | 3 | Image of the Beast | | | |
| M A Y | 8 | The Burning | Filmways Pictures / Cropsy Venture / Miramax Films | Tony Maylam (director); Bob Weinstein, Peter Lawrence (screenplay); Brian Matthews, Lou David, Leah Ayres, Brian Backer, Larry Joshua, Jason Alexander, Ned Eisenberg, Fisher Stevens, Holly Hunter, Willie Reale, Carrick Glenn, Carolyn Houlihan, Shelley Bruce, Sarah Chodoff, Bonnie Deroski, Kevi Kendall, J.R. McKechnie, George Parry, Ame Segull, Bruce Kluger, John Roach, James Van Verth | |
| M A Y | 8 | Lady Chatterley's Lover | Cannon Films / Columbia Pictures | Just Jaeckin (director/screenplay); Marc Behm, Christopher Wicking (screenplay); Sylvia Kristel, Nicholas Clay, Shane Briant, Ann Mitchell, Elizabeth Spriggs, Pascale Rivault, Peter Bennett, Anthony Head, Frank Moorey, Bessie Love, John Tynan, Michael Huston, Fran Hunter, Ryan Michael, Mark Colleano | |
| M A Y | 15 | The Fan | Paramount Pictures | Edward Bianchi (director); Priscilla Chapman, John Hartwell (screenplay); Lauren Bacall, James Garner, Maureen Stapleton, Michael Biehn, Héctor Elizondo, Anna Maria Horsford, Reed Jones, Dana Delany, Dwight Schultz, Griffin Dunne, Liz Smith, Kurt Johnson, Feiga Martinez, Kaiulani Lee | |
| M A Y | 15 | Happy Birthday to Me | Columbia Pictures / Canadian Film Development Corporation / Famous Players / The Birthday Film Company | J. Lee Thompson (director); Timothy Bond, Peter Jobin, John Saxton (screenplay); Melissa Sue Anderson, Glenn Ford, Lawrence Dane, Sharon Acker, Frances Hyland, Tracey E. Bregman, Lisa Langlois, Jack Blum, Matt Craven, Lenore Zann, David Eisner, Lesleh Donaldson, Michel-René Labelle, Richard Rebiere | |
| M A Y | 21 | Death Hunt | 20th Century Fox / Golden Harvest | Peter R. Hunt (director); Michael Grais, Mark Victor (screenplay); Charles Bronson, Lee Marvin, Andrew Stevens, Carl Weathers, Ed Lauter, Angie Dickinson, Scott Hylands, Henry Beckman, William Sanderson, Jon Cedar, James O'Connell, Len Lesser, Maury Chaykin, August Schellenberg, Dick Davalos | |
| M A Y | 22 | Bustin' Loose | Universal Pictures / Omar Productions / Northwest Film and Television Consultants / Universal Clearances | Oz Scott (director); Lonne Elder III, Richard Pryor, Roger L. Simon (screenplay); Richard Pryor, Cicely Tyson, Robert Christian, George Coe, Earl Billings, Bill Quinn, Fred Carney, Peggy McCay, Roy Jenson, Angel Ramirez, Nick Dimitri, Gary Goetzman, Paul Mooney, Vern Taylor, Alphonso Alexander, Kia Cooper, Edwin de Leon, Jimmy Hughes, Edwin Kinter, Tami Luchow, Janet Wong, Morgan Roberts, Inez Pedroza | |
| M A Y | 22 | The Four Seasons | Universal Pictures | Alan Alda (director/screenplay); Alan Alda, Carol Burnett, Len Cariou, Sandy Dennis, Rita Moreno, Jack Weston, Bess Armstrong, Elizabeth Alda, Beatrice Alda | |
| M A Y | 22 | The Legend of the Lone Ranger | Universal Pictures / Associated Film Distribution / Eaves Movie Ranch / ITC Entertainment / Wrather Productions | William A. Fraker (director); Ivan Goff, Ben Roberts, William Roberts, Michael Kane, Gerald B. Derloshon (screenplay); Klinton Spilsbury, Michael Horse, Christopher Lloyd, Matt Clark, Juanin Clay, Jason Robards, John Bennett Perry, John Hart, Richard Farnsworth, Ted Flicker, Buck Taylor, Tom Laughlin, Merle Haggard, Lincoln Tate, James Keach | |
| M A Y | 22 | Outland | Warner Bros. / The Ladd Company | Peter Hyams (director/screenplay); Sean Connery, Peter Boyle, Frances Sternhagen, James B. Sikking, Kika Markham, Nicholas Barnes, Clarke Peters, Steven Berkoff, John Ratzenberger, Manning Redwood, Angus MacInnes, Eugene Lipinski, Sharon Duce, P. H. Moriarty, Angelique Rockas, Doug Robinson | |
| M A Y | 29 | Dead & Buried | AVCO Embassy Pictures | Gary Sherman (director); Ronald Shusett, Dan O'Bannon (screenplay); James Farentino, Melody Anderson, Jack Albertson, Dennis Redfield, Nancy Locke, Lisa Blount, Robert Englund, Bill Quinn, Michael Currie, Christopher Allport, Macon McCalman, Barry Corbin, Michael Pataki, Lisa Marie, Joseph G. Medalis, Estelle Omens | |
| M A Y | 29 | The Night the Lights Went Out in Georgia | AVCO Embassy Pictures | Ronald F. Maxwell (director); Bob Bonney (screenplay); Kristy McNichol, Dennis Quaid, Mark Hamill, Sunny Johnson, Don Stroud, Barry Corbin, Arlen Dean Snyder, Ellen Saland | |
| M A Y | 29 | Polyester | New Line Cinema / Dreamland / Michael White Productions | John Waters (director/screenplay); Divine, Tab Hunter, Edith Massey, Mink Stole, Stiv Bators, Susan Lowe, Cookie Mueller, Mary Vivian Pearce, Jean Hill, George Figgs, David Samson, Ken King, Mary Garlington, Joni Ruth White, Hans Kramm, Rick Breitenfeld, George Hulse, Marina Melin | |
| J U N E | 5 | Cheech & Chong's Nice Dreams | Columbia Pictures / C & C Brown Production | Tommy Chong (director); Cheech Marin, Tommy Chong, Stacy Keach, Paul Reubens, Evelyn Guerrero, Peter Jason, Tim Rossovich, Timothy Leary, Sandra Bernhard, Tony Cox, Michael Winslow, Cheryl Smith, Linnea Quigley | |
| J U N E | 5 | Final Exam | Motion Picture Marketing | Jimmy Huston (director/screenplay); Cecile Bagdadi, Joel S. Rice, DeAnna Robbins, Sherry Willis-Burch, Timothy L. Raynor, Jerry Rushing, Ralph Brown, John Fallon, Terry W. Farren, Sam Kilman, Don Hepner, Mary Ellen Withers, R.C. Nanney | |
| J U N E | 5 | Tuck Everlasting | One Pass Media | Frederick King Keller (director/screenplay); Fred A. Keller (screenplay); Margaret Chamberlain, Paul Fleesa, Fred A. Keller, James McGuire, Sonia Raimi, Marvin Macnow, Bruce D'Auria, Joel Chaney | |
| J U N E | 12 | Clash of the Titans | United Artists | Desmond Davis (director); Beverley Cross (screenplay); Harry Hamlin, Laurence Olivier, Judi Bowker, Maggie Smith, Burgess Meredith, Ursula Andress, Siân Phillips, Claire Bloom, Pat Roach, Susan Fleetwood, Tim Pigott-Smith, Jack Gwillim, Neil McCarthy, Vida Taylor, Donald Houston, Flora Robson, Anna Manahan, Freda Jackson | |
| J U N E | 12 | History of the World, Part I | 20th Century Fox / Brooksfilms | Mel Brooks (director/screenplay); Mel Brooks, Dom DeLuise, Madeline Kahn, Harvey Korman, Cloris Leachman, Ron Carey, Gregory Hines, Pamela Stephenson, Shecky Greene, Sid Caesar, Mary-Margaret Humes, Orson Welles, Carl Reiner, Howard Morris, Charlie Callas, Paul Mazursky, Henny Youngman, Hugh Hefner, Barry Levinson, John Myhers, John Hurt, Bea Arthur, Ronny Graham, Pat McCormick, Andreas Voutsinas, Spike Milligan, John Hillerman, Andrew Sachs, Fiona Richmond, Nigel Hawthorne, Bella Emberg | |
| J U N E | 12 | Raiders of the Lost Ark | Paramount Pictures / Lucasfilm Ltd. | Steven Spielberg (director); Lawrence Kasdan (screenplay); Harrison Ford, Karen Allen, Paul Freeman, Ronald Lacey, John Rhys-Davies, Denholm Elliott, Wolf Kahler, Anthony Higgins, Don Fellows, William Hootkins, George Harris, Fred Sorenson, Frank Marshall, Pat Roach, Vic Tablian, Alfred Molina, Terry Richards | |
| J U N E | 19 | The Cannonball Run | 20th Century Fox / Golden Harvest | Hal Needham (director); Brock Yates (screenplay); Burt Reynolds, Roger Moore, Farrah Fawcett, Dom DeLuise, Dean Martin, Sammy Davis Jr., Adrienne Barbeau, Tara Buckman, Jamie Farr, Terry Bradshaw, Mel Tillis, Jackie Chan, Michael Hui, George Furth, Peter Fonda, Bert Convy, Jack Elam, Rick Aviles, Alfie Wise, John Fiedler, Molly Picon, Lois Hamilton, Johnny Yune, Bianca Jagger, Valerie Perrine, Robert Tessier, Warren Berlinger, Jimmy "The Greek" Snyder, Joe Klecko, Brock Yates, Hal Needham, Ken Squier, June Foray | |
| J U N E | 19 | Herbie Rides Again (re-release) | Walt Disney Productions / Buena Vista Distribution | Robert Stevenson (director); Bill Walsh (screenplay); Helen Hayes, Ken Berry, Stefanie Powers, Keenan Wynn, John McIntire, Huntz Hall, Ivor Barry, Vito Scotti, Liam Dunn, Elaine Devry, Chuck McCann, Richard X. Slattery, Don Pedro Colley, Larry J. Blake, Iggie Wolfington, Jack Manning, Hal Baylor, Herb Vigran, Norm Grabowski, Burt Mustin, John Myhers, John Stephenson, Robert Carson, Raymond Bailey, Arthur Space, John Hubbard, Fritz Feld, Alvy Moore, John Zaremba, Alan Carney, Ken Sansom, Hal Williams | |
| J U N E | 19 | Superman II | Warner Bros. / Dovemead Ltd. / International Film Production | Richard Lester (director); Mario Puzo (screenplay); Christopher Reeve, Gene Hackman, Ned Beatty, Jackie Cooper, Sarah Douglas, Margot Kidder, Jack O'Halloran, Valerie Perrine, Susannah York, Clifton James, E. G. Marshall, Marc McClure, Terence Stamp | |
| J U N E | 19 | Swiss Family Robinson (re-release) | Walt Disney Productions / Buena Vista Distribution | John McKimson, Ken Annakin (directors); Lowell S. Hawley (screenplay); John Mills, Dorothy McGuire, James MacArthur, Janet Munro, Sessue Hayakawa, Tommy Kirk, Kevin Corcoran, Cecil Parker, Andy Ho, Milton Reid, Larry Taylor | |
| J U N E | 26 | Dragonslayer | Paramount Pictures / Walt Disney Productions | Matthew Robbins (director/screenplay); Hal Barwood (screenplay); Peter MacNicol, Caitlin Clarke, Ralph Richardson, John Hallam, Peter Eyre, Sydney Bromley, Chloe Salaman, Ian McDiarmid, Albert Salmi, Norman Rodway, Emrys James, Roger Kemp | |
| J U N E | 26 | For Your Eyes Only | United Artists / Eon Productions | John Glen (director); Richard Maibaum, Michael G. Wilson (screenplay); Roger Moore, Carole Bouquet, Topol, Lynn-Holly Johnson, Julian Glover, Michael Gothard, Cassandra Harris, John Wyman, Desmond Llewelyn, Jill Bennett, Jack Hedley, Lois Maxwell, Geoffrey Keen, James Villiers, John Moreno, Walter Gotell, Toby Robins, Jack Klaff, Stefan Kalipha, Charles Dance, Eva Reuber-Staier, Janet Brown, John Hollis, Robert Rietti, Bob Simmons | |
| J U N E | 26 | The Great Muppet Caper | Universal Pictures / Associated Film Distribution / ITC Films / Henson Associates | Jim Henson (director); Tom Patchett, Jay Tarses, Jerry Juhl, Jack Rose (screenplay); Jim Henson, Frank Oz, Jerry Nelson, Richard Hunt, Dave Goelz, Steve Whitmire, Louise Gold, Kathryn Mullen, Caroll Spinney, Charles Grodin, Diana Rigg, John Cleese, Peter Ustinov, Jack Warden, Peter Falk, Robert Morley, Joan Sanderson, Michael Robbins, Peter Hughes, Peggy Aitchison, Tommy Godfrey, Erica Creer, Kate Howard, Della Finch | |
| J U N E | 26 | Roadgames | AVCO Embassy Pictures / GUO Film Distributors / Essaness Pictures / Australian Film Commission / Victorian Film Corporation / Western Australian Film Council / Quest Films | Richard Franklin (director/screenplay); Everett De Roche (screenplay); Stacy Keach, Jamie Lee Curtis, Marion Edward, Grant Page | |
| J U N E | 26 | Stripes | Columbia Pictures | Ivan Reitman (director); Dan Goldberg, Harold Ramis (screenplay); Bill Murray, Harold Ramis, Warren Oates, P. J. Soles, Sean Young, John Candy, John Larroquette, Roberta Leighton, John Voldstad, John Diehl, Lance LeGault, Conrad Dunn, Judge Reinhold, Joe Flaherty, Dave Thomas, Timothy Busfield, Robert J. Wilke, Bill Paxton, Antone Pagán | |

== July–September ==
| Opening | | Title | Production company | Cast and crew | Ref. |
|---|---|---|---|---|---|
| J U L Y | 1 | S.O.B. | Paramount Pictures / Lorimar Productions | Blake Edwards (director/screenplay); Julie Andrews, William Holden, Richard Mulligan, Stuart Margolin, Larry Hagman, Robert Vaughn, Marisa Berenson, Robert Webber, Shelley Winters, Robert Preston, Loretta Swit, Craig Stevens, Robert Loggia, Jennifer Edwards, Rosanna Arquette, John Lawlor, John Pleshette, Ken Swofford, Hamilton Camp, Paul Stewart, Benson Fong, Larry Storch, Virginia Gregg, Joe Penny, Erica Yohn, Colleen Brennan, Charles Lampkin, Gene Nelson, Mimi Davis, David Young, Byron Kane, Herb Tanney, Bert Rosario | |
| J U L Y | 10 | Escape from New York | AVCO Embassy Pictures / International Film Investors / Goldcrest Films International / City Films | John Carpenter (director/screenplay); Nick Castle (screenplay); Kurt Russell, Lee Van Cleef, Ernest Borgnine, Donald Pleasence, Isaac Hayes, Harry Dean Stanton, Adrienne Barbeau, Tom Atkins, Season Hubley, Charles Cyphers, Frank Doubleday, John Strobel, Nancy Stephens, George Buck Flower, Ox Baker, Jamie Lee Curtis, Steven Ford, Bob Minor, John Diehl, Carmen Filpi, Rodger Bumpass, John Carpenter, Nick Castle, Debra Hill, Ken Tipton | |
| J U L Y | 10 | The Fox and the Hound | Walt Disney Productions / Buena Vista Distribution | Ted Berman, Richard Rich, Art Stevens (directors); Mickey Rooney, Kurt Russell, Pearl Bailey, Jack Albertson, Sandy Duncan, Jeanette Nolan, Pat Buttram, John Fiedler, John McIntire, Dick Bakalyan, Paul Winchell, Keith Mitchell, Corey Feldman | |
| J U L Y | 17 | Arthur | Orion Pictures / Warner Bros. | Steve Gordon (director/screenplay); Dudley Moore, Liza Minnelli, John Gielgud, Geraldine Fitzgerald, Jill Eikenberry, Stephen Elliott, Ted Ross, Barney Martin, Paul Gleason, Phyllis Somerville, Lou Jacobi, Justine Johnston, Lawrence Tierney, Mark Margolis, Marcella Lowery, Helen Hanft, Raymond Serra, Peter Evans, Richard Hamilton, Marianne Muellerleile, Thomas Barbour, Irving Metzman, Anne De Salvo | |
| J U L Y | 17 | Endless Love | Universal Pictures / PolyGram Pictures | Franco Zeffirelli (director); Judith Rascoe (screenplay); Brooke Shields, Martin Hewitt, Shirley Knight, Don Murray, Richard Kiley, Penelope Milford, Beatrice Straight, James Spader, Tom Cruise, Ian Ziering, Jami Gertz, Jeff Marcus, Walt Gorney | |
| J U L Y | 17 | Zorro, The Gay Blade | 20th Century Fox | Peter Medak (director); Johnston McCulley, Hal Dresner, Greg Alt, Don Moriarty (screenplay); George Hamilton, Lauren Hutton, Ron Leibman, Brenda Vaccaro, Donovan Scott, James Booth, Helen Burns, Clive Revill, Carolyn Seymour, Eduardo Noriega, Pilar Pellicer, Frank Welker, Jorge Russek, Eduardo Alcaraz, Carlos Bravo y Fernández, Roberto Dumont, Jorge Bolio | |
| J U L Y | 24 | Blow Out | Filmways Pictures / Viscount Associates | Brian De Palma (director/screenplay); John Travolta, Nancy Allen, John Lithgow, Dennis Franz, John McMartin, Robin Sherwood, Michael Tearson, Peter Boyden, Curt May, John Aquino | |
| J U L Y | 24 | Eye of the Needle | United Artists / Kings Road Entertainment | Richard Marquand (director); Stanley Mann (screenplay); Donald Sutherland, Kate Nelligan, Ian Bannen, Christopher Cazenove, Stephen MacKenna, Philip Martin Brown, George Belbin, Faith Brook, Barbara Graley, Arthur Lovegrove, Barbara Ewing, Patrick Connor, David Hayman, Alex McCrindle, John Bennett, Sam Kydd, John Paul, Bill Nighy, Jonathan and Nicholas Haley (twins), Allan Surtees, Rik Mayall | |
| J U L Y | 24 | Wolfen | Orion Pictures / Warner Bros. | Michael Wadleigh (director/screenplay); David M. Eyre, Jr. (screenplay); Albert Finney, Diane Venora, Edward James Olmos, Gregory Hines, Tom Noonan, Dick O'Neill, Dehl Berti, Peter Michael Goetz, Reginald VelJohnson, James Tolkan, Donald Symington, Tom Waits | |
| J U L Y | 31 | Escape to Victory | Paramount Pictures / Lorimar | John Huston (director); Evan Jones, Yabo Yablonsky, Djordje Milićević, Jeff Maguire (screenplay); Sylvester Stallone, Michael Caine, Max von Sydow, Carole Laure, Benoît Ferreux, Clive Merrison, Maurice Roëves, Michael Cochrane, Zoltán Gera, Tim Pigott-Smith, Daniel Massey, Jean-François Stévenin, Julian Curry, Pelé, Bobby Moore, John Wark, Osvaldo Ardiles, Kazimierz Deyna, Søren Lindsted, Paul Van Himst, Mike Summerbee, Hallvar Thoresen, Russell Osman, Kevin O'Callaghan, Co Prins, Amidou, George Mikell, Gary Waldhorn, Werner Roth, Laurie Sivell, Arthur Brauss, Michael Wolf, David Shawyer | |
| J U L Y | 31 | Under the Rainbow | Orion Pictures / Warner Bros. | Steve Rash (director); Pat McCormick, Harry Hurwitz, Martin Smith, Fred Bauer, Pat Bradley (screenplay); Chevy Chase, Carrie Fisher, Eve Arden, Joseph Maher, Robert Donner, Billy Barty, Mako, Cork Hubbert, Pat McCormick, Adam Arkin, Zelda Rubinstein, Jerry Maren, Peter Issacksen, Tony Cox, Phil Fondacaro, Debbie Lee Carrington | |
| A U G U S T | 7 | Condorman | Walt Disney Productions / Buena Vista Distribution | Charles Jarrott (director); Mickey Rose, Marc Stirdivant (screenplay); Michael Crawford, Oliver Reed, Barbara Carrera, James Hampton, Jean-Pierre Kalfon, Dana Elcar, Vernon Dobtcheff, Robert Arden | |
| A U G U S T | 7 | Gallipoli | Roadshow Film Distributors / Paramount Pictures / Associated R&R Films | Peter Weir (director/screenplay); David Williamson (screenplay); Mark Lee, Mel Gibson, Bill Kerr, Harold Hopkins, Charles Yunupingu, Ron Graham, Gerda Nicolson, Robert Grubb | |
| A U G U S T | 7 | Heavy Metal | Columbia Pictures / Guardian Trust Company / Canadian Film Development Corporation / Famous Players / Potterton Productions | Gerald Potterton (director); Daniel Goldberg, Len Blum (screenplay); Rodger Bumpass, Jackie Burroughs, John Candy, Joe Flaherty, Don Francks, Martin Lavut, Marilyn Lightstone, Eugene Levy, Alice Playten, Harold Ramis, Susan Roman, Richard Romanus, August Schellenberg, John Vernon, Zal Yanovsky, Percy Rodriguez, Harvey Atkin, Al Waxman, Douglas Kenney, George Touliatos, Warren Munson, Thor Bishopric, Mavor Moore, Cedric Smith, Vlasta Vrána | |
| A U G U S T | 7 | Student Bodies | Paramount Pictures | Mickey Rose (director/screenplay); Kristen Riter, Matt Goldsby, Cullen Chambers, Richard Belzer, Joe Flood, Joe Talarowski, Mimi Weddell, Dario Jones, Carl Jacobs, Peggy Cooper, Janice E. O'Malley, Kevin Mannis, Sara Eckhardt, Oscar James, Kay Ogden, Patrick "The Stick" Boone Varnell, Brian Batytis, Joan Browning Jacobs, Angela Bressler, Keith Singleton | |
| A U G U S T | 7 | Tarzan, the Ape Man | Metro-Goldwyn-Mayer / United Artists | John Derek (director); Tom Rowe, Gary Goddard (screenplay); Bo Derek, Richard Harris, John Phillip Law, Miles O'Keeffe, Steve Strong, Maxime Philoe, Leonard Bailey | |
| A U G U S T | 8 | Galaxy Express | New World Pictures | Roger Corman (director); Paul Grogan (screenplay); B. J. Ward, Fay McKay, Corey Burton | |
| A U G U S T | 14 | Deadly Blessing | United Artists / PolyGram Pictures / Inter Planetary | Wes Craven (director/screenplay); Glenn M. Benest, Matthew Barr (screenplay); Maren Jensen, Lisa Hartman, Sharon Stone, Susan Buckner, Jeff East, Colleen Riley, Douglas Barr, Lois Nettleton, Ernest Borgnine, Michael Berryman, Kevin Cooney | |
| A U G U S T | 14 | An Eye for an Eye | Embassy Pictures / Adams Apple Production Company / South Street Films / Westcom Barber International | Steve Carver (director); James Bruner, William Gray (screenplay); Chuck Norris, Christopher Lee, Richard Roundtree, Matt Clark, Mako, Maggie Cooper, Rosalind Chao, Professor Toru Tanaka, Stuart Pankin, Terry Kiser, Mel Novak, Nigel Davenport, J. E. Freeman, Robert Behling, Harry Wong, Sam Hiona, Earl Nichols | |
| A U G U S T | 14 | They All Laughed | PSO / Moon Pictures / Time-Life Films | Peter Bogdanovich (director/screenplay); Blaine Novak (screenplay); Ben Gazzara, Audrey Hepburn, John Ritter, Colleen Camp, Patti Hansen, Dorothy Stratten, George Morfogen, Blaine Novak, Sean Ferrer, Linda MacEwen | |
| A U G U S T | 21 | An American Werewolf in London | Universal Pictures / PolyGram Pictures / The Guber-Peters Company | John Landis (director/screenplay); David Naughton, Jenny Agutter, Griffin Dunne, John Woodvine, Brian Glover, Lila Kaye, David Schofield, Paul Kember, Frank Oz, Don McKillop, Rik Mayall, Sean Baker, Sydney Bromley, Frank Singuineau, Will Leighton, Michael Carter, Anne-Marie Davies, Albert Moses, Alan Ford, Christine Hargreaves, Linzi Drew, Nina Carter, Vic Armstrong, John Landis | |
| A U G U S T | 21 | First Monday in October | Paramount Pictures | Ronald Neame (director); Jerome Lawrence, Robert Edwin Lee (screenplay); Walter Matthau, Jill Clayburgh, Barnard Hughes, Jan Sterling, James Stephens, Joshua Bryant, Wiley Harker, Charles Lampkin, F.J. O'Neil, Lew Palter, Richard McMurray, Herb Vigran | |
| A U G U S T | 21 | Honky Tonk Freeway | Universal Pictures / Associated Film Distribution / EMI Films / Honky Tonk Freeway Company / Kendon Films | John Schlesinger (director); Edward Clinton (screenplay); Howard Hesseman, Teri Garr, Peter Billingsley, Beau Bridges, Beverly D'Angelo, Daniel Stern, Celia Weston, Deborah Rush, Geraldine Page, George Dzundza, Joe Grifasi, Hume Cronyn, Jessica Tandy, Frances Lee McCain, William Devane, Jerry Hardin, John Ashton, Frances Bay, Anne Ramsey | |
| A U G U S T | 21 | Prince of the City | Orion Pictures / Warner Bros. | Sidney Lumet (director/screenplay); Jay Presson Allen (screenplay); Treat Williams, Jerry Orbach, Richard Foronjy, Lindsay Crouse, Bob Balaban, Kenny Marino, Carmine Caridi, Paul Roebling, James Tolkan, Steve Inwood, Matthew Laurance, Ron Karabatsos, Robert Christian, Lee Richardson, Lane Smith, Cosmo Allegretti, Bobby Alto, Conrad Fowkes, Peter Friedman, Peter Michael Goetz, Lance Henriksen, Eddie Jones, Cynthia Nixon, Ron Perkins, Walter Brooke, Alan King, Bruce Willis, Don Billett, Tony Page, Norman Parker, Tony Turco, Ron Maccone, Tony DiBenedetto, Tony Munafo, Michael Beckett, Burton Collins, Henry Ferrentino, Carmine Foresta, Don Leslie, Dana Lorge, Harry Madsen, E.D. Miller, Lionel Pina, José Angel Santana, Ilana Rapp | |
| A U G U S T | 28 | Body Heat | Warner Bros. / The Ladd Company | Lawrence Kasdan (director/screenplay); William Hurt, Kathleen Turner, Richard Crenna, Ted Danson, J. A. Preston, Kim Zimmer, Jane Hallaren, Lanna Saunders, Carola McGuinness, Michael Ryan | |
| A U G U S T | 28 | Chu Chu and the Philly Flash | 20th Century Fox / Melvin Simon Productions | David Lowell Rich (director); Barbara Dana (screenplay); Alan Arkin, Carol Burnett, Jack Warden, Ruth Buzzi, Adam Arkin, Danny Aiello, Danny Glover, Sid Haig, Vincent Schiavelli, Vito Scotti, Lou Jacobi | |
| A U G U S T | 28 | Hell Night | Compass International Pictures | Tom DeSimone (director); Randy Feldman (screenplay); Linda Blair, Vincent Van Patten, Peter Barton, Kevin Brophy, Suki Goodwin, Jimmy Sturtevant, Jenny Neumann | |
| A U G U S T | 28 | Private Lessons | Jensen Farley Pictures / Cinema Epoch | Alan Myerson (director); Dan Greenburg (screenplay); Sylvia Kristel, Howard Hesseman, Eric Brown, Patrick Piccininni, Ed Begley Jr., Pamela Bryant, Meridith Baer, Ron Foster, Peter Elbling, Dan Greenburg, Dan Barrows, Marian Gibson, Judy Helden | |
| S E P T E M B E R | 18 | Continental Divide | Universal Pictures / Amblin Entertainment | Michael Apted (director); Lawrence Kasdan (screenplay); John Belushi, Blair Brown, Allen Garfield, Carlin Glynn, Tony Ganios, Bruce Jarchow | |
| S E P T E M B E R | 18 | Das Boot | Constantin Film / Columbia Pictures / Bavaria Film / Radiant Film / Westdeutscher Rundfunk / SWR Fernsehen | Wolfgang Petersen (director/screenplay); Jürgen Prochnow, Herbert Grönemeyer, Klaus Wennemann, Hubertus Bengsch, Martin Semmelrogge, Bernd Tauber, Erwin Leder, Martin May, Heinz Hoenig, Uwe Ochsenknecht, Claude-Oliver Rudolph, Jan Fedder, Ralf Richter, Oliver Stritzel, Jean-Claude Hoffmann, Lutz Schnell, Konrad Becker, Otto Sander, Günter Lamprecht, Sky du Mont | |
| S E P T E M B E R | 18 | The French Lieutenant's Woman | United Artists | Karel Reisz (director); Harold Pinter (screenplay); Meryl Streep, Jeremy Irons, David Warner, Hilton McRae, Emily Morgan, Charlotte Mitchell, Lynsey Baxter, Peter Vaughan, Colin Jeavons, Liz Smith, Patience Collier, John Barrett, Leo McKern, Penelope Wilton, Alun Armstrong, Gérard Falconetti, Jean Faulds | |
| S E P T E M B E R | 18 | Mommie Dearest | Paramount Pictures | Frank Perry (director/screenplay); Robert Getchell, Tracy Hotchne, Frank Yablans (screenplay); Faye Dunaway, Diana Scarwid, Steve Forrest, Howard Da Silva, Mara Hobel, Rutanya Alda, Harry Goz, Michael Edwards, Jocelyn Brando, Priscilla Pointer, Xander Berkeley, Belita Moreno, Alice Nunn, Jeremy Scott Reinbolt, Carolyn Coates, Margaret Fairchild | |
| S E P T E M B E R | 18 | Raggedy Man | Universal Pictures | Jack Fisk (director); William D. Wittliff (screenplay); Sissy Spacek, Eric Roberts, Sam Shepard, R. G. Armstrong, William Sanderson, Henry Thomas, Tracey Walter, Carey Hollis | |
| S E P T E M B E R | 23 | Rich and Famous | United Artists / Metro-Goldwyn-Mayer | George Cukor (director); Gerald Ayres (screenplay); Jacqueline Bisset, Candice Bergen, David Selby, Hart Bochner, Steven Hill, Michael Brandon, Meg Ryan, Nicole Eggert, Matt Lattanzi, Daniel Faraldo, Fay Kanin, Nina Foch, Dick Cavett, Ray Bradbury, Merv Griffin, Marsha Hunt, Christopher Isherwood, Gavin Lambert, Roger Vadim, Paul Morrissey, Frank De Felitta, Frances Bergen, Alan Berliner, Randal Kleiser | |
| S E P T E M B E R | 25 | The Boogens | Jensen Farley Pictures / Taft International Pictures | James L. Conway (director); David O'Malley, Bob Hunt (screenplay); Rebecca Balding, Fred McCarren, Anne-Marie Martin, Jeff Harlan, John Crawford, Med Flory, Jon Lormer, Scott Wilkinson | |
| S E P T E M B E R | 25 | Carbon Copy | AVCO Embassy Pictures / Hemdale Film Corporation / RKO Pictures / First City | Michael Schultz (director); Stanley Shapiro (screenplay); George Segal, Denzel Washington, Susan Saint James, Jack Warden, Dick Martin, Paul Winfield, Macon McCalman, Vicky Dawson | |
| S E P T E M B E R | 25 | Only When I Laugh | Columbia Pictures / Rastar | Glenn Jordan (director); Neil Simon (screenplay); Marsha Mason, Kristy McNichol, James Coco, Joan Hackett, David Dukes, John Bennett Perry, Guy Boyd, Ed Moore, Peter Coffield, Mark Schubb, Venida Evans, John Vargas, Dan Monahan, Jane Atkins, Kevin Bacon, Phillip Lindsay | |
| S E P T E M B E R | 25 | So Fine | Warner Bros. | Andrew Bergman (director/screenplay); Ryan O'Neal, Jack Warden, Mariangela Melato, Richard Kiel, Fred Gwynne, Mike Kellin, David Rounds, Tony Sirico, Michael Lombard, Jessica James, Michael LaGuardia, Angela Pietropinto, Judith Cohen | |
| S E P T E M B E R | 25 | Southern Comfort | 20th Century Fox | Walter Hill (director/screenplay); David Giler, Michael Kane (screenplay); Keith Carradine, Powers Boothe, Fred Ward, Franklyn Seales, T. K. Carter, Lewis Smith, Les Lannom, Peter Coyote, Carlos Brown, Brion James, Sonny Landham, Allan Graf, Ned Dowd | |
| S E P T E M B E R | 25 | True Confessions | United Artists | Ulu Grosbard (director); Joan Didion, John Gregory Dunne (screenplay); Robert De Niro, Robert Duvall, Burgess Meredith, Charles Durning, Ed Flanders, Cyril Cusack, Kenneth McMillan, Ed Flanders, Dan Hedaya, Rose Gregorio, Jeanette Nolan | |

== October–December ==
| Opening | | Title | Production company | Cast and crew | Ref. |
|---|---|---|---|---|---|
| O C T O B E R | 2 | Enter the Ninja | The Cannon Group / Golan-Globus Productions | Menahem Golan (director); Dick Desmond (screenplay); Franco Nero, Susan George, Sho Kosugi, Christopher George, Alex Courtney, Will Hare, Zachi Noy, Constantine Gregory, Dale Ishimoto, Joonee Gamboa, Leo Martinez, Ken Metcalfe, Subas Herrero, Alan Amiel, Doug Ivan | |
| O C T O B E R | 2 | Paternity | Paramount Pictures | David Steinberg (director); Charlie Peters (screenplay); Burt Reynolds, Beverly D'Angelo, Lauren Hutton, Norman Fell, Paul Dooley, Elizabeth Ashley, Juanita Moore, Peter Billingsley, Susanna Dalton | |
| O C T O B E R | 2 | Zoot Suit | Universal Pictures | Luis Valdez (director/screenplay); Daniel Valdez, Edward James Olmos, Rose Portillo, Charles Aidman, Tyne Daly, John Anderson, Abel Franco, Bernadette Colognne, Mike Gomez, Alma Martinez, Frank McCarthy, Lupe Ontiveros, Marco Rodríguez, Kelly Ward, Kurtwood Smith, Dennis Stewart, Robert Beltran | |
| O C T O B E R | 9 | Full Moon High | Filmways Pictures / Larco Productions | Larry Cohen (director/screenplay); Adam Arkin, Ed McMahon, Roz Kelly, Joanne Nail, Bill Kirchenbauer, Kenneth Mars, Elizabeth Hartman, Alan Arkin, Louis Nye, Demond Wilson, Cheryl Lockett Alexander, Jim J. Bullock, Tom Aldredge, Tom Clancy, Laurene Landon, John Blyth Barrymore, Bob Saget, Pat Morita, Julius Harris, Armando G. Fernandez | |
| O C T O B E R | 9 | Tattoo | 20th Century Fox | Bob Brooks (director); Joyce Buñuel (screenplay); Bruce Dern, Maud Adams, Leonard Frey, John Getz, Cynthia Nixon, Patricia Roe, John Snyder, Rikke Borge, Peter Iacangelo, Alan Leach, Trish Doolan, Anthony Mannino, Lex Monson, Jane Hoffman, Robert Burr | |
| O C T O B E R | 9 | The Watcher in the Woods | Walt Disney Productions / Buena Vista Distribution | John Hough (director); Brian Clemens, Harry Spalding, Rosemary Anne Sisson (screenplay); Bette Davis, Carroll Baker, David McCallum, Lynn-Holly Johnson, Kyle Richards, Ian Bannen, Richard Pasco, Frances Cuka, Benedict Taylor, Eleanor Summerfield, Georgina Hale, Katharine Levy | |
| O C T O B E R | 11 | My Dinner with Andre | New Yorker Films | Louis Malle (director); Andre Gregory, Wallace Shawn (screenplay); Andre Gregory, Wallace Shawn | |
| O C T O B E R | 14 | Just Before Dawn | Picturmedia / Oakland Productions | Jeff Lieberman (director/screenplay); Mark Arywitz, Jonas Middleton (screenplay); George Kennedy, Chris Lemmon, Gregg Henry, Jamie Rose, Mike Kellin, Deborah Benson, Ralph Seymour, John Hunsaker, Katie Powell, Charles Bartlett, Hap Oslund, Barbara Spencer | |
| O C T O B E R | 15 | The Evil Dead | New Line Cinema / Renaissance Pictures | Sam Raimi (director/screenplay); Bruce Campbell, Ellen Sandweiss, Richard DeManincor, Betsy Baker, Theresa Tilly, Sam Raimi, Robert Tapert, Bob Dorian | |
| O C T O B E R | 16 | All the Marbles | United Artists | Robert Aldrich (director); Rich Eustis, Mel Frohman (screenplay); Peter Falk, Vicki Frederick, Laurene Landon, Richard Jaeckel, Burt Young, John Hancock, Faith Minton, Chick Hearn | |
| O C T O B E R | 23 | Galaxy of Terror | United Artists / New World Pictures | Bruce D. Clark (director/screenplay); Marc Siegler (screenplay); Edward Albert, Erin Moran, Ray Walston, Taaffe O'Connell, Bernard Behrens, Zalman King, Robert Englund, Sid Haig, Grace Zabriskie | |
| O C T O B E R | 23 | Nightmare | 21st Century Film Corporation | Romano Scavolini (director/screenplay); Baird Stafford, Sharon Smith, C.J. Cooke, Mike Cribben, Danny Ronan, Tammy Patterson, Kim Patterson, Kathleen Ferguson | |
| O C T O B E R | 23 | The Pit (Canada) | Amulet Pictures / Ambassador Film Distributors / New World Pictures / Embassy Home Entertainment | Lew Lehman (director); Ian A. Stuart (screenplay); Sammy Snyders, Jeannie Elias, Sonja Smits, Laura Hollingsworth, Richard Alden, John Auten, Laura Press, Paul Grisham, Wendy Schmidt, Allison Tye | |
| O C T O B E R | 23 | Silence of the North | Universal Pictures | Allan King (director); Patricia Louisianna Knop (screenplay); Ellen Burstyn, Tom Skerritt, Gordon Pinsent, Colin Fox, David Fox, Frank C. Turner, Thomas Hauff, Robert Clothier, Murray Westgate, Kay Hawtrey, Booth Savage, Sean Sullivan, Chapelle Jaffe, Janet Amos, Sean McCann, Jennifer McKinney, Donna Dobrijevic, Jeff Banks, Richard Farrell, Larry Reynolds, Freddie Lang, Dennis Robinson, Leah Marie Hopkins, Kenneth Pogue, Frank Adamson, Lynn Mason Green | |
| O C T O B E R | 30 | Halloween II | Universal Pictures / Dino De Laurentiis Corporation | Rick Rosenthal (director); John Carpenter, Debra Hill (screenplay); Jamie Lee Curtis, Donald Pleasence, Charles Cyphers, Lance Guest, Pamela Susan Shoop, Hunter von Leer, Tawny Moyer, Ana Alicia, Nancy Stephens, Gloria Gifford, Leo Rossi, Ford Rainey, Dick Warlock, Nick Castle, Tony Moran, Jeffrey Kramer, Cliff Emmich, John Zenda, Lucille Benson, Anne-Marie Martin, Dana Carvey, Billy Warlock, Nancy Loomis, Kyle Richards, Brian Andrews, Jonathan Prince, Anne Bruner, Catherine Bergstrom, Jack Verbois, Nichole Drucker, Adam Gunn | |
| O C T O B E R | 30 | Looker | Warner Bros. / The Ladd Company | Michael Crichton (director/screenplay); Albert Finney, James Coburn, Susan Dey, Leigh Taylor-Young, Dorian Harewood, Darryl Hickman, Terri Welles, Terry Kiser | |
| O C T O B E R | 30 | Shock Treatment | 20th Century Fox | Jim Sharman (director/screenplay); Richard O'Brien (screenplay); Jessica Harper, Cliff De Young, Richard O'Brien, Patricia Quinn, Little Nell, Ruby Wax, Rik Mayall, Charles Gray, Barry Humphries, Barry Dennen, Betsy Brantley, Chris Malcolm, Eugene Lipinski, Gary Shail, Gary Martin, Sinitta Renet, Sal Piro, Jeremy Newson, Wendy Raebeck, Darlene Johnson, Manning Redwood, Claire Toeman, Donald Waugh, David John | |
| N O V E M B E R | 1 | Death of a Centerfold: The Dorothy Stratten Story | NBC / Warner Bros. Domestic Television Distribution / Wilcox Productions / MGM Television | Gabrielle Beaumont (director); Donald E. Stewart (screenplay); Jamie Lee Curtis, Bruce Weitz, Robert Reed, Mitchell Ryan, Bibi Besch, Tracy Reed, Gloria Gifford, Hugh Gillin, Luca Bercovici, Kale Browne, Mark Withers, Robert Clotworthy | |
| N O V E M B E R | 6 | The Prowler | Sandhurst / Graduation Films | Joseph Zito (director); Neal Barbera, Glenn Leopold (screenplay); Vicky Dawson, Christopher Goutman, Cindy Weintraub, Farley Granger, Lawrence Tierney, Thom Bray, Carleton Carpenter, Lisa Dunsheath, David Sederholm, Diane Rode, Bryan Englund, Donna Davis, Joy Glaccum, Timothy Wahrer, John Seitz, Bill Hugh Collins, Dan Lounsbery, Douglas Stevenson, Susan Monts, Bill Nunnery | |
| N O V E M B E R | 6 | Fantasies | | John Derek (director/screenplay); Bo Derek, Peter Hooten, Phaedon Georgitsis, Anna Alexiadis, Nikos Pashalidis, Kostas Baladimas, Therese Bohlin, Boucci Simis, Viennoula Koussathana | |
| N O V E M B E R | 6 | Time Bandits | AVCO Embassy Pictures / HandMade Films / Janus Films | Terry Gilliam (director/screenplay); Michael Palin (screenplay); John Cleese, Sean Connery, Shelley Duvall, Katherine Helmond, Ian Holm, Michael Palin, Ralph Richardson, Peter Vaughan, David Warner, David Rappaport, Kenny Baker, Jack Purvis, Mike Edmonds, Tiny Ross, Craig Warnock, Jim Broadbent, Malcolm Dixon, Derek Deadman, Jerold Wells, David Daker, Sheila Fearn, Tony Jay, Terence Bayler, Preston Lockwood, Derrick O'Connor, Neil McCarthy, Frank Converse, Myrtle Devenish, Ian Muir | |
| N O V E M B E R | 13 | Porky's | 20th Century Fox / Astral Films | Bob Clark (director/screenplay); Kim Cattrall, Scott Colomby, Kaki Hunter, Nancy Parsons, Alex Karras, Susan Clark, Dan Monahan, Mark Herrier, Wyatt Knight, Roger Wilson, Cyril O'Reilly, Tony Ganios, Boyd Gaines, Doug McGrath, Art Hindle, Wayne Maunder, Chuck Mitchell, Eric Christmas, Jack Mulcahy, Will Knickerbocker, Bill Hindman | |
| N O V E M B E R | 13 | The Pursuit of D. B. Cooper | Universal Pictures / PolyGram Filmed Entertainment | Roger Spottiswoode (director); Jeffrey Alan Fiskin (screenplay); Robert Duvall, Treat Williams, Kathryn Harrold, Ed Flanders, Paul Gleason, R. G. Armstrong, Dorothy Fielding, Nicolas Coster, Cooper Huckabee, Howard K. Smith, Christopher Curry | |
| N O V E M B E R | 20 | The Looney Looney Looney Bugs Bunny Movie | Warner Bros. | Friz Freleng (director/screenplay); Mel Blanc, June Foray, Frank Welker, Bea Benaderet, Stan Freberg, Ralph James, Frank Nelson | |
| N O V E M B E R | 20 | Ragtime | Paramount Pictures | Miloš Forman (director); Michael Weller (screenplay); James Cagney, Howard Rollins, Brad Dourif, Elizabeth McGovern, Moses Gunn, Mary Steenburgen, James Olson, Kenneth McMillan, Pat O'Brien, Mandy Patinkin, Donald O'Connor, Fran Drescher, Richard Griffiths, Norman Mailer, Robert Joy, Jeff Daniels, Debbie Allen, Jeffrey DeMunn, Edwin Cooper, Frankie Faison, Alan Gifford, Richard Oldfield, George Harris, Samuel L. Jackson, Michael Jeter, Andreas Katsulas, Joe Praml, Calvin Levels, Bessie Love, Christopher Malcolm, Stuart Milligan, John Ratzenberger, Zack Norman, Ethan Phillips, Barry Dennen, Jack Nicholson | |
| N O V E M B E R | 20 | Whose Life Is It Anyway? | United Artists / Cinema International Corporation / Metro-Goldwyn-Mayer | John Badham (director); Brian Clark, Reginald Rose (screenplay); Richard Dreyfuss, John Cassavetes, Christine Lahti, Bob Balaban, Thomas Carter, Kaki Hunter, Kenneth McMillan, Janet Eilber | |
| D E C E M B E R | 4 | On Golden Pond | Universal Pictures / Associated Film Distribution / IPC Films / ITC Entertainment | Mark Rydell (director); Ernest Thompson (screenplay); Katharine Hepburn, Henry Fonda, Jane Fonda, Doug McKeon, Dabney Coleman, William Lanteau, Chris Rydell | |
| D E C E M B E R | 4 | Reds | Paramount Pictures / Barclays Mercantile / Industrial Finance / JRS Productions | Warren Beatty (director/screenplay); Trevor Griffiths (screenplay); Warren Beatty, Diane Keaton, Edward Herrmann, Jerzy Kosinski, Jack Nicholson, Gene Hackman, Paul Sorvino, Maureen Stapleton, Nicolas Coster, William Daniels, M. Emmet Walsh, Ian Wolfe, Bessie Love, Max Wright, George Plimpton, Kathryn Grody, Dolph Sweet, Dave King, Roger Sloman, Jan Triska, Harry Ditson, Leigh Curran, Nancy Diuguid, Stuart Richman, Oleg Kerensky, John J. Hooker | |
| D E C E M B E R | 11 | Buddy Buddy | United Artists | Billy Wilder (director/screenplay); I. A. L. Diamond (screenplay); Jack Lemmon, Walter Matthau, Paula Prentiss, Klaus Kinski, Dana Elcar, Miles Chapin, Ed Begley Jr., Michael Ensign, Joan Shawlee, Ben Lessy, John Schubeck, Myrna Dell, Fil Formicola, C.J. Hunt, Bette Raya, Ronnie Sperling, Suzie Galler, Frank Farmer, Tom Kindle, Biff Manard | |
| D E C E M B E R | 11 | Dawn of the Mummy | Harmony Gold USA / Goldfrab Distribution | Frank Agrama (director/screenplay); Ronald Dobrin, Daria Price (screenplay); Ahmed Rateb, Brenda King, Barry Sattels, George Peck, John Salvo, Ibrahim Khan, Joan Levy, Ellen Faison, Dianne Beatty, Ali Gohar, Bahar Saied, Ali Azab, Ahamed Labab, Laila Nasr, Kandarp Raval | |
| D E C E M B E R | 11 | Four Friends | Filmways Pictures | Arthur Penn (director); Steve Tesich (screenplay); Craig Wasson, Jodi Thelen, Michael Huddleston, Jim Metzler, Miklos Simon, Elizabeth Lawrence, Julia Murray, Reed Birney, James Leo Herlihy, Lois Smith, Glenne Headly | |
| D E C E M B E R | 11 | Pennies from Heaven | United Artists | Herbert Ross (director); Dennis Potter (screenplay); Steve Martin, Bernadette Peters, Christopher Walken, Jessica Harper, Vernel Bagneris, John McMartin, John Karlen, Jay Garner, Tommy Rall, Nancy Parsons, Duke Stroud, Will Hare, Robert Fitch, Eliska Krupka, Raleigh Bond | |
| D E C E M B E R | 11 | Rollover | Warner Bros. | Alan J. Pakula (director); David Shaber (screenplay); Jane Fonda, Kris Kristofferson, Hume Cronyn, Josef Sommer, Bob Gunton | |
| D E C E M B E R | 18 | Absence of Malice | Columbia Pictures / Mirage Enterprises | Sydney Pollack (director); Kurt Luedtke (screenplay); Paul Newman, Sally Field, Bob Balaban, Melinda Dillon, Luther Adler, Barry Primus, Josef Sommer, Wilford Brimley, Don Hood | |
| D E C E M B E R | 18 | Cinderella (re-release) | Walt Disney Productions / RKO Radio Pictures | Clyde Geronimi, Hamilton Luske, Wilfred Jackson (directors); Ken Anderson, Perce Pearce, Winston Hibler, Bill Peet, Ted Sears, Maurice Rapf, Homer Brightman, Erdman Penner, Harry Reeves, Joe Rinaldi (screenplay); Ilene Woods, Eleanor Audley, Verna Felton, Rhoda Williams, Lucille Bliss, William Phipps, Jimmy MacDonald, Luis van Rooten, Don Barclay, June Foray, Mike Douglas, Betty Lou Gerson | |
| D E C E M B E R | 18 | Ghost Story | Universal Pictures | John Irvin (director); Lawrence D. Cohen (screenplay); Fred Astaire, Melvyn Douglas, Douglas Fairbanks Jr., John Houseman, Craig Wasson, Patricia Neal, Alice Krige, Jacqueline Brookes, Miguel Fernandes, Lance Holcomb, Brad Sullivan, Michael O'Neill, Guy Boyd, Robin Curtis, James Greene, Tim Choate, Mark Chamberlin, Ken Olin, Kurt Johnson | |
| D E C E M B E R | 18 | Neighbors | Columbia Pictures | John G. Avildsen (director); Larry Gelbart (screenplay); John Belushi, Dan Aykroyd, Cathy Moriarty, Kathryn Walker, Tim Kazurinsky, Tino Insana, Henry Judd Baker, Lauren-Marie Taylor, Bernie Friedman, Igors Gavon, Dru-Ann Chuckran, P.L. Brown, Sherman G. Lloyd, Bert Kittel, J.B. Friend | |
| D E C E M B E R | 18 | Sharky's Machine | Orion Pictures / Deliverance Productions | Burt Reynolds (director); Gerald Di Pego (screenplay); Burt Reynolds, Vittorio Gassman, Brian Keith, Charles Durning, Earl Holliman, Bernie Casey, Henry Silva, Darryl Hickman, Richard Libertini, Rachel Ward, John Fiedler, Hari Rhodes, Joseph Mascolo, Carol Locatell, Tony King, Suzee Pai, Val Avery, Dar Robinson, James O'Connell, Aarika Wells | |
| D E C E M B E R | 20 | Chariots of Fire | Warner Bros. / The Ladd Company / Allied Stars Ltd / Goldcrest Films / Enigma Productions | Hugh Hudson (director); Colin Welland (screenplay); Ben Cross, Ian Charleson, Nigel Havers, Cheryl Campbell, Alice Krige, Lindsay Anderson, Dennis Christopher, Nigel Davenport, Brad Davis, Peter Egan, John Gielgud, Ian Holm, Patrick Magee, Nicholas Farrell, Struan Rodger, David Yelland, Daniel Gerroll, Richard Griffiths | |
| D E C E M B E R | 20 | Taps | 20th Century Fox | Harold Becker (director); Robert Mark Kamen, James Lineberger, Darryl Ponicsan (screenplay); George C. Scott, Timothy Hutton, Ronny Cox, Sean Penn, Tom Cruise, Brendan Ward, Evan Handler, John P. Navin Jr., Billy Van Zandt, Giancarlo Esposito | |
| D E C E M B E R | 25 | Modern Problems | 20th Century Fox | Ken Shapiro (director/screenplay); Tom Sherohman, Arthur Sellers (screenplay); Chevy Chase, Patti D'Arbanville, Mary Kay Place, Brian Doyle-Murray, Nell Carter, Dabney Coleman, Mitch Kreindel | |

== See also ==
- List of 1981 box office number-one films in the United States
- 1981 in the United States
