= Porky's II: The Next Day =

1983 film by Bob Clark

- Theatrical release poster
- Directed by: Bob Clark
- Written by: Roger Swaybill; Alan Ormsby; Bob Clark
- Based on: Characters by Bob Clark
- Produced by: Don Carmody; Bob Clark
- Starring: Dan Monahan; Wyatt Knight; Mark Herrier; Roger Wilson; Cyril O'Reilly; Tony Ganios; Kaki Hunter; Scott Colomby; Nancy Parsons; Joseph Running Fox; Eric Christmas; Bill Wiley; Edward Winter; Ilse Earl; Cisse Cameron; Art Hindle
- Cinematography: Reginald H. Morris
- Edited by: Stan Cole
- Music by: Carl Zittrer
- Production company: Astral Films
- Distributed by: 20th Century-Fox
- Release date: June 24, 1983
- Running time: 98 minutes
- Countries: United States; Canada
- Language: English
- Budget: $7 million
- Box office: $33.8-55 million

Porky's II: The Next Day is a 1983 sex comedy film and the sequel to the 1981 film Porky's. The film is directed and co-written by Bob Clark. Despite the films' title, the character of Porky Wallace (Chuck Mitchell) does not make an appearance. A sequel, Porky's Revenge!, was released in 1985.

In the film, the drama club of a high school plans a production of Romeo and Juliet which will feature interracial romance. The production is cancelled after the intervention of a religious leader Reverend Bubba Flavel, the county commissioners, and the local chapter of the Ku Klux Klan. John Henry, the lead actor of the play, is attacked and beaten by the Klan. The high school students soon have a revenge scheme which will destroy the careers of their enemies and publicly humiliate them.

== Plot ==
The Angel Beach High School Drama Club is producing a William Shakespeare Festival in which the group from the first film is participating. A religious leader named Reverend Bubba Flavel wants to halt the production because his group, "The Righteous Flock," believe Shakespeare is indecent and profane. Flavel recruits the support of the local Ku Klux Klan chapter by informing them that the Festival will feature an interracial kiss between John Henry, a Seminole student playing Romeo, and a white Juliet played by Wendy Williams. The students seek the help of County Commissioner Bob Gebhardt, who promises to pull some strings to keep the Festival running. Gebhardt reneges on his promise after his aide Hurley delivers a stack of 5,000 petitions from voters that Flavel gathered. Meanwhile, the Klan attacks and beats John Henry. Though the Angel Beach principal, Mr. Carter, enthusiastically supports his students, he is forced to cancel the Festival after the county commissioners voted against it. The Angel Beach students plot revenge against Flavel, Commissioner Gebhardt, the rest of the county commissioners, and the Klan.

The teens discover that the county commissioners, while publicly espousing decency and morality, secretly gather to watch stag films in the courthouse basement. The students take a tape recorder to the courthouse and record the commissioners' crude commentary on the films, which include remarks that Flavel provided the pornography.

After the Festival is cancelled, Wendy agrees to a date with Gebhardt at a classy restaurant. Wendy arrives in a deliberately showy, vulgar dress with her breasts artificially inflated by a secret container of fake vomit. Throughout dinner, she constantly shouts out Commissioner Gebhardt's name, his upcoming re-election, and her own age, alerting the other patrons to the situation. Once she has the attention of the entire restaurant, she announces that Gebhardt took her virginity and that she is now carrying his child. Finally, to complete Gebhardt's humiliation, she uses the fake vomit to pretend to throw up in a fountain. When Gebhardt tries to sneak away, Pee Wee Morris jumps out with a camera, promising to send the photos to the local newspapers.

The students lure the Klansmen (who are on their way to Flavel's celebratory revival meeting) into the school gym, whose bleachers are filled to capacity with Seminoles. The students hold down the Klansmen while their Jewish friend, Brian Schwartz, shaves their heads with an izmel. The Angel Beach students and the Seminoles then strip the Klansmen naked and force them to run across the stage of Flavel's revival. In the confusion, the students commandeer the public address system and play the recording from the courthouse basement. The outraged crowd turns on Flavel, the county commissioners, and the Klan. A closing montage of newspapers report Gebhardt resigns, Flavel is ousted from his position, the county commissioners face obscenity charges, and the Festival resumes.

== Cast ==
- Dan Monahan as Edward "Pee Wee" Morris
- Wyatt Knight as Tommy Turner
- Mark Herrier as Billy McCarty
- Tony Ganios as Anthony "Meat" Tuperello
- Scott Colomby as Brian Schwartz
- Cyril O'Reilly as Tim Cavanaugh
- Kaki Hunter as Wendy Williams
- Ilse Earl as Mrs. Morris
- Eric Christmas as Mr. Carter
- Bill Wiley as Reverend Bubba Flavel
- Nancy Parsons as Ms. Beulah Balbricker
- Joseph Runningfox as John Henry
- Roger Wilson as Mickey Jarvis
- Art Hindle as Officer Ted Jarvis
- Jack Mulcahy as Frank Bell
- Bill Hindman as Coach Goodenough
- Mal Jones as Mayor Abernathy
- Richard Liberty as Commissioner Couch
- Fred Buch as Commissioner Hurley
- Edward Winter as Commissioner Bob Gebhardt
- Will Knickerbocker as Klan #1

== Production ==
Greynolds Park in North Miami Beach, Florida stood in for the Everglades and a plant nursery on Old Cutler Road was turned into a cemetery for the graveyard scenes.

Cowriter Roger Swaybill later said "It took us about six weeks to write the sequel. And it was before the cameras by June. The result was far less spontaneous. The kids just wanted us to be down and dirty."

== Home media ==
Porky's II: The Next Day was released on DVD on May 22, 2007, alongside Porky's and Porky's Revenge, in a DVD box set called The Porky's Ultimate Collection.

Kino Lorber released Porky's II: The Next Day, along with Porky's Revenge, as a double feature Blu-Ray on December 13, 2016. The theatrical trailer for the film is the only bonus material on the disc.

== Reception ==
=== Box office ===
The film's gross receipts were considerably lower than the first Porky's film. While Porky's grossed $105 million in the North American market, Porky's II: The Next Day took in $33,759,266.

=== Critical response ===
Review aggregator Rotten Tomatoes gives the film a score of 9% based on the reviews of 11 critics. The film was nominated for a Stinkers Bad Movie Awards for Worst Picture, but lost to Krull at the 1983 Stinkers Bad Movie Awards.
