= So Evil, My Sister =

1974 American horror film

- Genre: Horror
- Written by: Tony Crechales
- Directed by: Reginald LeBorg
- Starring: Susan Strasberg; Faith Domergue
- Theme music composer: Johnny Pate
- Country of origin: United States
- Original language: English

Production
- Producers: Sidney L. Caplan; Robert J. Stone
- Production locations: Burbank, California; Malibu, California; Pasadena, California
- Cinematography: Dean Cundey
- Editor: Herbert L. Strock
- Running time: 80 minutes

Original release
- Network: ABC
- Release: December 25, 1974

So Evil, My Sister (also titled Psycho Sisters) is a 1974 American horror film, starring Susan Strasberg and Faith Domergue. It was directed by Reginald LeBorg and produced by Zenith Productions.

== Cast ==
- Susan Strasberg as Brenda
- Faith Domergue as Millie Hartman
- Charles Knox Robinson as Jerry
- Sydney Chaplin as George
- Steve Mitchell as Lt. Haze
- Ben Frank as Woody
- John Howard as Dr. Thomas
- Biff Yeager as Bill
- Kathleen Freeman as Hilda
- John Ashton as Brock

== Production ==
According to director Reginald LeBorg, the film was financed on $300,000. He suggested to the producers that it could be made in as little as "ten or eleven days." The small budget would preclude any set construction or elaborate props, requiring that they shoot in "an office, or go on the road, or go to the beach."

LeBorg's movie provided little in the way of action, and the producers inserted a number of automobile chases. LeBorg declined to provide the editing and a cutter, Herbert L. Strock (director of Gog (1954) and Battle Taxi (1955)), was engaged to act as editorial supervisor.

So Evil, My Sister was LeBorg's last feature film of his career.

== Release ==
So Evil, My Sister never was given a general theatrical release by Zenith International and Joseph Brenner Associates. The production has since appeared on Home Video.
