= Scott Colomby =

American actor

- Born: September 19, 1952 (age 74); Brooklyn, New York, U.S.
- Occupation: Actor
- Years active: 1965–present
- Father: Harry Colomby

Scott Colomby (born September 19, 1952) is an American film, television, and stage actor, best known for his roles in Caddyshack (1980) and Porky's (1982).

== Life and career ==
Colomby was born in Brooklyn, New York on September 19, 1952. His father, Harry, was a jazz agent, manager, and school teacher and his mother, Lee, is a stage actress. While Scott was in grade school, his family moved from Brooklyn to Los Angeles. Colomby attended Beverly Hills High School and graduated in 1970. He attended classes for theatre arts at the Immaculate Heart school, where he enjoyed classic readings and decided to make acting his career.

At age 13, he made his acting debut on the daytime soap opera Days of Our Lives (1965). He followed this with a starring role in the Canadian biker film The Proud Rider in 1971. These performances led to a succession of guest roles on several television shows, including Room 222 (1972), Ironside (1974), Phyllis (1975), The Streets of San Francisco (1975), Baretta (1976), Charlie's Angels (1977), and Black Sheep Squadron (1978) among others. Colomby had recurring roles on the sitcom Sons & Daughters in 1974 and the soap opera parody Mary Hartman, Mary Hartman in 1976. He starred on the short-lived comedy Szysznyk with Ned Beatty, and appeared in six episodes of One Day at a Time (1977–78) as Cliff Randall, Barbara Cooper's crush.

In 1980, Colomby played Tony D'Annunzio, the rival of his fellow caddie Danny Noonan, in the golf comedy film Caddyshack. Two years later, he played Brian Schwartz in the sex comedy Porky's (1982). Despite negative reviews, the film was a major success, grossing more than $100 million domestically. Colomby later returned for the film's two less successful sequels, Porky's II: The Next Day (1983) and Porky's Revenge! (1985).

Colomby has continued to act, but his performances have become less frequent since the 1990s. He is the co-founder of Big Elvin & The Professors' Blues Theater, an acting company that provides a grab bag of music, comedy, street theater and performance art.

== Filmography ==
=== Film ===
Year	Title	Role	Notes
1974	But Jack Was a Good Driver	Bart	(Short)
1980	Caddyshack	Tony D'Annunzio	
1980	Angel On My Shoulder	Tony	
1982	Porky's	Brian Schwartz	
1983	Porky's II: The Next Day	Brian Schwartz	
1985	Porky's Revenge!	Brian Schwartz	
1995	Timemaster	The Gambler	
1997	Quiet Days in Hollywood	Eva's Husband	
1998	Desperate Measures	Patrol Cop	
1998	Jack Frost	Scott (Bass)	
2008	The Seekers	Bill Vista	
2010	The Other Way	Nick	
2023	All of It Happened On a Thursday	Alligator Swanson	

=== Television ===
Year	Title	Role	Notes
1971	Montserrat		TV movie
1973	Outrage	Dennis Hully	TV movie
1972–1973	Room 222	Marvin / Joe Ramirez	2 episodes
1974	Can Ellen Be Saved	Randy	TV movie
1974	Sons and Daughters	Stanley 'Stash' Melnick / Stash	6 episodes
1974	Ironside	Tony Parkos	Episode: "Act of Vengeance"
1974	Love Is Not Forever	Stash	TV movie
1975	Lucas Tanner	Blackie Mason	Episode: "Requiem for a Son"
1975	The Secrets of Isis	Lee Webster	Episode: "Bigfoot"
1975	Phyllis	Warren Hollis	Episode: "Phyllis and the Little People"
1975	The Streets of San Francisco	Bobby Tilton	Episode: "Most Likely to Succeed"
1976	Mary Hartman, Mary Hartman	The Armenian	Episode #1.9
1976	Bert D'Angelo/Superstar		Episode: "A Noise in the Streets"
1976	Baretta	Jimmy Turner	Episode: "Under the City"
1977	Lanigan's Rabbi	Donny Hollister	Episode: "Say It Ain't So, Chief"
1977	Charlie's Angels	Sgt. Tommy Anders	Episode: "Angel Baby"
1978	Black Sheep Squadron	Sergeant Carlos Harpenger	Episode: "Ten'll Get You Five"
1978	Sister Terri	Angel	TV movie
1978	Are You in the House Alone?	Steve Pastorinis	TV movie
1977–1978	One Day at a Time	Cliff Randall	6 episodes
1977–1978	Szysznyk	Tony La Placa	15 episodes
1977–1980	Quincy, M.E.	Eric Ramey / Steve Daniels	2 episodes
1980	Angel on My Shoulder	Tony	TV movie
1984	Fame	Sandy Bailey	Episode: "Bottle of Blues"
1985	St. Elsewhere	Painter	Episode: "Give the Boy a Hand"
1986	The A-Team	Frank	Episode: "Members Only"
1988	The Law & Harry McGraw	Dominic Lamonica	Episode: "Gilhooley's Is History"
1988	Hooperman	Freddie Lopez	Episode: "Tomato Can"
1988	Days of Our Lives	José Torres	18 episodes
1989	Dirty Dancing	Flash Dinetti	Episode: "Hit the Road"
1989	Hunter	Sonny Ruiz	Episode: "Ring of Honor"
1989	Generations	Todd	4 episodes
1990	The Knife and Gun Club	Husband	TV movie
1990	Over My Dead Body	Jesse Moraza	Episode: "Dad and Buried"
1990	Gabriel's Fire	Stretch	Episode: "The Wind Rancher"
1989–1991	Midnight Caller	Ricky Roses	2 episodes
1991	Dragnet	Jeff Trainor	Episode: "To Steal a Child"
1992	Silk Stalkings	Tony Paladino	Episode: "Blo-Dri"
1994	RoboCop: The Series	Albert Delorio	Episode: "Zone Five"
1994	Lois & Clark: The New Adventures of Superman	Dr. Derek Camden	Episode: "Wall of Sound"
1996	Walker, Texas Ranger	Savage	Episode: "Blackout"
1999	L.A. Heat	Danny 'The Eel' Bledsoe	Episode: "Danny the Eel"
2012	Lost Angels	Vincent	Episode: "Strange Love"
