= Hollywood Zap! =

1986 film by David Cohen

- Theatrical release poster
- Directed by: David Cohen
- Written by: David Cohen
- Produced by: Ben Frank; Bobbi Frank; Dror Soref
- Starring: Ben Frank; Ivan E. Roth; De Waldron; Neil Flanagan; Chuck Mitchell; Tony Cox
- Cinematography: Tom Fraser
- Edited by: Rick Westover
- Music by: Jaap
- Distributed by: Troma Entertainment
- Release date: November 1986
- Running time: 88 minutes
- Country: United States
- Language: English
- Budget: $350,000

Hollywood Zap! is a 1986 American comedy film written and directed by Canadian filmmaker David Cohen (no relation to David X. Cohen) and distributed by Troma Entertainment, a company known for its low-budget exploitation films. In Europe, the film was released as Porky's 4: Zap!

In the film, a bored clerk decides to quit his job and travel to Hollywood, California to fulfill his dreams and to find his missing father. He chooses a hustler as his traveling companion, but both of them experience disillusionment during their quest.

== Plot ==
Two young men hit the road to Hollywood, California to look for money, fame, and the wild life in this youthful comedy. Tucker "Downer" Downs (Ivan E. Roth), tired of his boring job as a clerk in a women's fashion outlet, quits and heads to the Western United States to seek success and in search of his father, who disappeared 24 years before. En route, Downs hooks up with wasted video addict/hustler Nash (Ben Frank), who is seeking a title match with "The Zap", holder of the record score in Zaxxon. Together they have many adventures during their trek to Tinsel Town.

== Cast ==
- Ben Frank as Nash
- Ivan E. Roth as Tucker "Downer" Downs
- De Waldron as "Teetee"
- Claude Earl Jones as Uncle Lucas
- Neil Flanagan as Granville Downs / Sister Grace E. Magno
- Helen Verbit as Housekeeper
- Chuck Mitchell as Mr. Prideman, Lawyer
- Anne Gaybis as Debbie
- Walter Stocker as Father Priest
- Sandy Rose as Waitress
- Louise Hartley as Nurse
- Don Carmona as "Tacomeat"
- Nancye Ferguson as Tacomeat's Girlfriend
- Carmen Filpi as Magazine Vendor
- Tony Cox as Kong
- Wayne Montanio as Ventriloquist

== Reception ==
In 2001, the film was featured at the 1st annual Video Game Festival to examine gaming's impact on media and culture. Described as being "historically significant", the film was sponsored by Twin Galaxies Intergalactic Scoreboard, the official international electronic scoreboard for video games.
