= Don't Answer the Phone! =

1980 horror film

- Theatrical release poster
- Directed by: Robert Hammer
- Written by: Michael D. Castle; Robert Hammer
- Produced by: Michael D. Castle; Robert Hammer
- Starring: James Westmoreland; Flo Lawrence; Nicholas Worth
- Cinematography: James L. Carter
- Edited by: Joe Fineman
- Music by: Byron Allred
- Production company: Scorpion
- Distributed by: Crown International Pictures
- Release date: February 29, 1980
- Running time: 94 minutes
- Country: United States
- Language: English
- Box office: $2 million

Don't Answer the Phone! is a 1980 American psychological horror film co-written and directed by Robert Hammer. While not prosecuted for obscenity, the film was seized and confiscated in the UK under Section 3 of the Obscene Publications Act 1959 during the video nasty panic.

== Plot ==
Vietnam vet, amateur bodybuilder, and talented porno-photographer Kirk Smith is a crazed killer who stalks the streets of Los Angeles, strangles young women in lurid fashion, and sexually abuses their dead bodies. The film opens with Smith killing a nurse before stripping her corpse. Between murders, he carries out twisted religious ceremonies and has imaginary conversations with his dead father while weeping. He repeatedly contacts Dr. Lindsay Gale, a psychologist with a radio show as well as a private therapy practice. He calls her show, speaking with an assumed Spanish accent and complaining of chronic headaches and blackouts. He follows one of Dr. Gale's female patients, Carol, home from her therapy session, and tortures her to death. He also murders a hooker while on the phone to Dr. Gale's show, forcing Dr. Gale to listen to the victim's cries.

Two goofy detectives named Hatcher and McCabe are charged with the task of tracking him down. When McCabe first questions Dr. Gale, his manner is brusque and unsympathetic. She develops a strong dislike for him. However, he later prevents one of her patients from committing suicide, after which Dr. Gale becomes fond of McCabe and they have a brief love affair.

Hatcher and McCabe visit a whore-and-drug-house in search of a witness who has seen the strangler leaving the scene of one of his murders, but the witness, a pimp and drug dealer, attacks them and they shoot him to death without being able to question him.

Kirk Smith is interrupted at the scene of his next murder by the victim's landlady, and he leaves a portfolio of photographs behind as he flees the scene. Hatcher and McCabe show the photographs to the local pornography dealer Sam Gluckman; he identifies them as the work of Kirk Smith, who has provided him with high-quality pornographic pictures in the past. When the detectives search Smith's apartment, they find his pictures of Dr. Gale and realize that he has selected her to be his next victim. During this time, Smith invades Dr. Gale's home, ties her up, and terrorizes her for hours, and ranting about his childhood.

McCabe goes to Dr. Gale's home just in time to rescue her. At the end of a protracted struggle, McCabe shoots Smith many times, including several times in the back. Kirk stumbles towards a pool and expires as he plunges in. The film ends with a shot of Smith's bullet-ridden floating body as McCabe snarls, "Adios, creep!"

== Cast ==
- James Westmoreland as Lt. Chris McCabe
- Ben Frank as Sgt Hatcher
- Flo Lawrence as Dr Lindsay Gale (credited as "Flo Gerrish")
- Nicholas Worth as Kirk Smith
- Denise Galik as Lisa
- Stan Haze as Adkins
- Gary Allen as John Feldon
- Michael D. Castle as Lab Man
- Pamela Jean Bryant as Sue Ellen
- Chris Wallace as Psychic
- Dale Kalberg as Nurse
- Mike Levine as Gary Markov
- Chuck Mitchell as Sam Gluckman
- Victor Mohica as Ventura
- Susanne Severeid as Hooker
- Paula Warner as Carol
- Gail Jensen as Joyce
- Joyce Ann Jodan as Roommate
- Corinne Cook as Rikki
- Don Lake as Man in Plastic

== Production ==
The film was shot in and around Los Angeles, California. Robert Hammer drew inspiration from a wave of murders by strangulation that occurred in 1978 in Los Angeles; the film working title was Hollywood Strangler.

== Censorship ==
When first released on DVD by Rhino Entertainment in 2001, an edited for television print was used, which had been subject to heavy edits—over 9 minutes were edited from the film. The uncensored, theatrical release version was released by BCI Eclipse on DVD in October 2006.

== Soundtrack ==
The score was composed by Byron Allred.

== Release ==
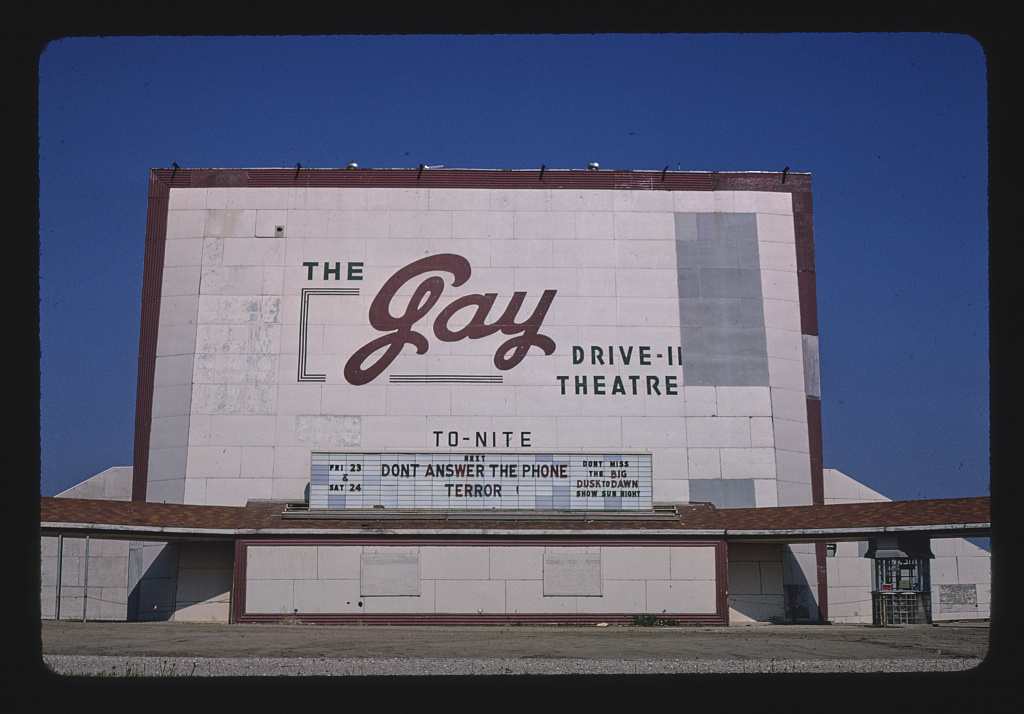
Don't Answer the Phone being shown at a drive in theater in Worthington, Minnesota, 1980

Crown International Pictures released the film on February 29, 1980. By the end of that year the film had accrued US$ 1,750,000 in distributors' domestic (U.S. and Canada) rentals, making it the year's 105th biggest earner.

The VHS was released in the United States on 28 February 1982 by Media Home Entertainment. The DVD was released in 2002 by Rhino Home Video and re-released by BCI Eclipse on 10 October 2006.

The film was restored and released on DVD and Blu-ray by Vinegar Syndrome in January 2017.

== Reception ==
Vincent Canby in The New York Times felt the film was "a nasty, dimly executed exploitation movie about a psychopathic fellow who roams around Los Angeles strangling women with stockings and then mutilating their bodies. The performances are terrible, as are the writing and the direction…" Paul Taylor in Time Out magazine called it "a routinely mindless sickie".

Years after its initial release, the film's mainstream critical reputation continues to be abysmal. Michael Weldon, in The Psychotronic Encyclopedia of Film, noted, "if you like really sick films, see this one...The ads made it look like another baby-sitter-in-distress movie, but it's in a class by itself". Phil Hardy's The Aurum Film Encyclopedia: Horror described the film as "yet another woman-in-jeopardy movie...the covert suggestion that the female victims have 'asked for it' is particularly objectionable". However, the review further observed that Nicholas Worth's performance as the lunatic killer was "so outrageously over-the-top, and so bizarrely eccentric as to be horribly fascinating and the final line of 'Adios, creep', delivered over a shot of Worth's corpse floating in a swimming pool, is curiously resonant". Leonard Maltin gave the film a BOMB rating, stating that it was another psychopathic Vietnam veteran killer film, warning readers to not watch the film. The websites Letterboxd, The Grindhouse Database and The Spinning Image list this movie as belonging to the vetsploitation subgenre.
