= The Proud Rider =

- Directed by: Walter Baczynsky
- Written by: Chester Stocki
- Produced by: George Fras
- Starring: Michael Bell; Scott Colomby; Karen Gregory; Art Hindle
- Cinematography: Walter Wasik
- Edited by: Bruce Sabsay
- Music by: Paul Hoffert; Sol Sherman
- Release date: 27 September 1971
- Running time: 85 minutes
- Country: Canada
- Language: English
- Budget: C$147,000

The Proud Rider (also known as The Last Ride) is a Canadian outlaw biker film released in 1971. The film was directed by the Polish-American filmmaker Wolodymyr “Walter” Baczynsky (1936-1988)

Inspired in part by Easy Rider, it stars Michael Bell, Scott Colomby, and (in his screen debut) Art Hindle. The film tagline was "Tough? You bet your..."

== Production ==
Filmed in and around Courtice, Ontario, the bikers (as in other biker films of the era, including Angels Hard as They Come) were played by actual members of Satan's Choice.

== Reception ==
The film "opened strongly" in Toronto but this theatrical success was very short. The fact that the cast included actual bikers was judged as adding a "touch of realism" by TV Guide.

== Sources ==
- "The Proud Rider" at Letterboxd.com
- "The Proud Rider" at IMDb.com
- "The Proud Rider" at TCM.com
- "The Proud Rider" at Bikermovies411.com
