= Ben Frank =

American actor (1934–1990)

- Born: September 2, 1934; New York City, New York, United States
- Died: September 11, 1990 (aged 56)
- Spouse: Bobbi Frank

Ben Frank (September 2, 1934 – September 11, 1990) was a veteran character actor. His wife was producer Bobbi Frank.

== Biography ==
Frank was born in New York on September 2, 1934. As a child from the ages of 6 to 12 he sang on stage. In later years he was a professional boxer and had only two losses from twenty bouts.

== Career ==
His career spanned 28 years. He appeared in 20 motion movies and had 125 television roles. He also appeared in 20 stage plays, including the then renowned West Hollywood Gallery Theatre’s 1971 production of “King of the Schnorrers” where he created the re-written role of Yankela. His first role was in 1963, in the horror movie Terrified where he played the part of Duell. Other films included So Evil, My Sister, a 1974 film that starred Susan Strasberg. In 1975 he appeared as Hopper McGee in the movie about Murph the Surf released as Live A Little, Steal A Lot, a film that starred Robert Conrad and Don Stroud. He also appeared in the Battlestar Galactica episode "Murder on the Rising Star" (1979), and later in the movie Death Wish II (1982) playing the part of Lt. Mankiewicz. He appeared in the Tales from the Darkside episode "A New Lease on Life" (1986).

Frank produced and had the lead in a 1986 film called Hollywood Zap! in which he played a hustler.

He was involved in an anti smoking commercial not long before he died.

== Partial filmography ==
Year	Title	Role	Notes
1963	Terrified	Duell	
1974	So Evil, My Sister	Woody	
1975	Jessi's Girls	Brock	
1975	Murph the Surf	Hopper Magee	
1979	Just You and Me, Kid	First Policeman	
1980	Foxes	Daryl	
1980	Don't Answer the Phone	Sergeant Hatcher	
1980	Falling in Love Again	Cabbie #1 (Present day)	
1982	Death Wish II	Lieutenant Art Mankiewicz	
1982	Slapstick of Another Kind	Quentin, The handyman	
1986	Hollywood Vice Squad	Daley	
1986	Hollywood Zap!	Nash	
