= Nancy Parsons =

American actress (1942–2001)

- Born: Nancy Anne Parsons; January 17, 1942
- Died: January 5, 2001 (aged 58); La Crosse, Wisconsin, U.S.
- Occupation: Actress
- Years active: 1976–1998
- Spouse: Alan Hipwell (m. 1963; div. 1972)
- Children: 2

Nancy Anne Parsons (January 17, 1942 – January 5, 2001) was an American stage, film, and television actress. She is known for portraying the discipline-minded coach Beulah Balbricker in the sex comedy Porky's (1981) and its sequels Porky's II: The Next Day (1983) and Porky's Revenge (1985).

== Early years ==
Parsons was raised in Minnetonka, Minnesota, one of the three daughters of Mary Margaret (née Samsa) and Charles Walter Parsons. She graduated from Minnetonka High School, Class of 1960.

== Career ==
Parsons resumed acting in 1974 after taking 10 years off to raise a family with two children. She starred as Miss Amelia Evans in Edward Albee's stage version of The Ballad of the Sad Café and received the top prize in the Hugh O'Brian Acting Awards at UCLA. She also went on to act at Theatre East in Studio City.

Parsons's film debut came in I Never Promised You a Rose Garden (1977). She portrayed Beulah Balbricker in the 1981 film Porky's and its sequels, as well as Ida in Motel Hell (1980), a role which earned her a nomination for a Saturn Award for Best Supporting Actress.

Parsons made guest appearances in several TV shows, including Remington Steele, Baretta, Charlie's Angels, The Rockford Files, Lou Grant, Family Ties, Star Trek: The Next Generation, and Days of Our Lives.

== Death ==
Parsons died from congestive heart failure on January 5, 2001, in La Crosse, Wisconsin, aged 58.

== Selected filmography ==
Year	Title	Role	Notes
1977	Prime Time a.k.a. American Raspberry	Lady Mailperson	
1977	I Never Promised You a Rose Garden	Singing Patient	
1979	The Lady in Red	Tiny Alice	
1980	Where the Buffalo Roam	Head Nurse	
1980	Motel Hell	Ida Smith	
1981	Honky Tonk Freeway	Alice the Teller	
1981	Smokey Bites the Dust	Harold's Mother	
1981	Porky's	Beulah Balbricker	
1981	Pennies from Heaven	The Old Whore	
1983	Porky's II: The Next Day	Beulah Balbricker	
1983	Quarterback Princess	Mrs. Klosterman	TV movie
1983	Sudden Impact	Mrs. Kruger	
1985	Porky's Revenge!	Beulah Balbricker	
1989	Homer and Eddie	Maid	
1989	Steel Magnolias	Janice Van Meter	
1990	Loose Cannons	Nurse	
1991	The Doctor	Laurie	
1991	Death Falls	Nurse	
1992	Ladybugs	Coach Annie	
1992	Wishman	Miss Crabbe	

== Selected television credits ==
- Charlie's Angels — S3. E14: "Angels in Springtime" as Zora Stafford (1978)
- Family Ties — S2. E21: "Diary of a Young Girl" as the Nurse looking after Jennifer when she had her tonsils taken out (1988).
- Star Trek: The Next Generation — S3. E9: "The Vengeance Factor" as Sovereign Marouk (1989)
- Hull High — S1. E19 (1990)
- Days of Our Lives — 27 episodes, Mary Brooke / Nurse Jackson (1994–1996)
- The Pretender — S2. E17: "Crash" as Martha Bowman (1998)
