= Chuck Mitchell =

American actor (1927–1992)

- Mitchell in Porky's (1981)
- Born: Charles Thomas Mitchell; November 28, 1927; Connecticut, United States
- Died: June 22, 1992 (aged 64); Hollywood, California, United States
- Other name: Chuck "Porky" Mitchell
- Occupations: Actor; singer; entertainer
- Years active: 1970–1987

Charles Thomas Mitchell (November 28, 1927 – June 22, 1992) was an American actor, singer and entertainer. He is known for his role as "Porky" in the 1981 film Porky's and its 1985 sequel Porky's Revenge!

== Career ==
Mitchell is also remembered as Rocko, the mean owner of the restaurant called "Pig Burgers" in the 1985 comedy Better Off Dead.

He became well known for his role as "Porky" in the comedy movie Porky's. He would reprise the role again in the 1985 sequel Porky's Revenge! He declined to appear in Porky's II: The Next Day.

He starred in the TV soap opera General Hospital as Big Ralph, and in the 1981 TV series Bret Maverick, as well as the 1983 miniseries The Winds of War.

Mitchell made guest appearances on the TV shows The Fall Guy, Hill Street Blues and Remington Steele.

In some of his films, he is credited as Chuck "Porky" Mitchell.

== Personal life ==
Mitchell had two sisters, Dorothy Farrell and Frances Mitchell.

== Death ==
Mitchell died on June 22, 1992, in Hollywood, California from cirrhosis of the liver at the age of 64.

== Filmography ==
=== Film ===
| Year | Title | Role | Notes |
|---|---|---|---|
| 1970 | Kemek | Detective | |
| 1979 | Penitentiary | Lieutenant Arnsworth | |
| 1980 | Don't Answer the Phone | Sam Gluckman | |
| 1980 | The Hearse | Counterman | |
| 1981 | American Pop | Doorkeeper | |
| 1981 | Porky's | Porky Wallace | |
| 1982 | Boxoffice | Mr. Joy | |
| 1982 | They Call Me Bruce? | Bartender | |
| 1983 | Good-bye, Cruel World | Larry Locatelli | |
| 1983 | Frightmare | Detective | |
| 1985 | Porky's Revenge! | Porky Wallace | |
| 1985 | Better Off Dead | Rocko | |
| 1986 | Hollywood Zap! | Mr. Prideman | |
| 1987 | Ghost Chase | Mr. Rosenbaum | |
| 1987 | Hateman | Judge | (final film role) |

=== Television ===
| Year | Title | Role | Notes |
|---|---|---|---|
| 1979 | Supertrain | Big Ed | Episode: "Express to Terror" |
| 1981 | General Hospital | Big Ralph | Unknown episodes |
| 1981 | Bret Maverick | Joe Dakota | 2 episodes |
| 1982 | The Fall Guy | Rex | Episode: "No Way Out" |
| 1982 | Trapper John, M.D. | Tiny Mankowitz | Episode: "You Pays Your Money" |
| 1983 | The Winds of War | Fishing Boat Skipper | Episode: "Cataclysm" |
| 1985 | Hill Street Blues | Fat Guy | Episode: "You're in Alice's" |
| 1985 | Remington Steele | Strip Club Owner | Episode: "Steele Trying" |
| 1986 | Simon & Simon | Gregory Ross | Episode: "Act Five" |
