= Tony Ganios =

American actor (1959–2024)

- Tony Ganios in Porky's 1981
- Born: October 21, 1959
- Died: February 18, 2024 (aged 64); New York, U.S.
- Occupation: Actor
- Years active: 1979–1993

Tony Ganios (October 21, 1959 – February 18, 2024) was an American actor. He played tough guy Perry LaGuardia in the 1979 film The Wanderers, and Anthony 'Meat' Tuperello in the 1981 comedy Porky's and its sequels.

== Life and career ==
Ganios made his debut appearance as tough guy Perry LaGuardia in The Wanderers. In 1981, he played a former football player turned mountain man in the John Belushi film Continental Divide.

Soon after, Ganios starred in the 1981 teen-sex comedy Porky's and its two sequels.

Ganios appeared in five episodes of the Emmy Award-winning 1980s TV series Wiseguy as muscular mob lawyer Mike "Mooch" Cacciatore, and he made a guest appearance in an episode of Scarecrow and Mrs. King. In 1990, Ganios appeared as a mercenary in Die Hard 2. His character kills a church caretaker and is later killed by Bruce Willis's character, who stabs him in the eye with an icicle.

After brief appearances in three films between 1991 and 1993, Ganios semi-retired from acting. One of those films was Rising Sun, in which his role referenced his earlier character from The Wanderers.

== Death ==
Ganios died of heart failure on February 18, 2024, at age 64 after being hospitalized for a spinal-cord infection.

== Filmography ==
| Year | Title | Role | Notes |
|---|---|---|---|
| 1979 | The Wanderers | Perry LaGuardia | Film. Debut as an actor and his first collaboration with director Philip Kaufman and actor Ken Wahl. |
| 1981 | Back Roads | Bartini | Film |
| 1981 | Continental Divide | Max Bernbaum | Film |
| 1981 | Porky's | Anthony "Meat" Tuperello | Film |
| 1983 | Porky's II: The Next Day | Anthony "Meat" Tuperello | Film |
| 1984 | Body Rock | Big Mac | Film |
| 1985 | Porky's Revenge! | Anthony "Meat" Tuperello | Film |
| 1987 | Scarecrow and Mrs. King | Simons | Episode: "Any Number Can Play" |
| 1988 | The Equalizer | Sergio | Episode: "Video Games" |
| 1989-1990 | Wiseguy | Mike "Mooch" Cacciatore | 5 episodes. Second collaboration with Ken Wahl. |
| 1990 | Die Hard 2 | Baker | Film |
| 1991 | The Taking of Beverly Hills | EPA Man | Film. Third collaboration with Ken Wahl. |
| 1992 | Ring of the Musketeers | Tony | 1 episode |
| 1993 | Rising Sun | Doorman guard (Perry) | Last appearance as an actor and his second collaboration with director Philip Kaufman. |
