= Continental Divide (film) =

1981 American romantic comedy directed by Michael Apted

- Theatrical release poster
- Directed by: Michael Apted
- Written by: Lawrence Kasdan
- Produced by: Robert T. Larson
- Starring: John Belushi; Blair Brown; Allen Goorwitz; Carlin Glynn; Tony Ganios; Bruce Jarchow
- Cinematography: John Bailey
- Edited by: Dennis Virkler
- Music by: Michael Small
- Production companies: Amblin Entertainment; Brillstein Company
- Distributed by: Universal Pictures
- Release date: September 18, 1981
- Running time: 103 minutes
- Country: United States
- Language: English
- Budget: $9 million
- Box office: $15 million

Continental Divide is a 1981 American romantic comedy-drama film starring John Belushi and Blair Brown. It was the first film to be credited as being produced by Steven Spielberg's production company Amblin Entertainment, with Spielberg serving as executive producer alongside Bernie Brillstein. It was directed by Michael Apted and written by Lawrence Kasdan. The film was released by Universal Pictures on September 18, 1981.

== Plot ==
Chicago newspaper reporter Ernie Souchak is investigating a corrupt alderman. While doing an exposé on some shady land dealings, he is assaulted by two crooked police officers sent by the alderman and ends up in the hospital.

Souchak's editor decides to send him out of town for his own safety. A city boy, Souchak reluctantly travels to the Rockies to interview the reclusive Dr. Nell Porter (Brown), who has been conducting research on the American bald eagles for several years.

The two are at odds at first. After finding out he is a reporter, she is reluctant to let him stay, but realizes he is not able to survive in the mountains without his guide, who is not scheduled to return for two weeks. He is skeptical about her work, but comes to admire Porter for her strong character and dedication. Eventually, they fall in love.

At first, she lets him stay as long as he doesn't write his story. As they learn to respect each other, she agrees to let him write about her. During his adventures, he sprains his back in an accident, is mauled by a cougar, and meets an All-American football player who has left civilization to become a mountain man.

Souchak returns to Chicago with her very much on his mind. When he finds out that one of his sources has been "accidentally" killed, he once again doggedly pursues the investigation until the alderman is forced to flee the country.

The same day, Souchak finds out that Porter is coming to Chicago to present a museum lecture on her work. With some uncertainty, he decides to attend, and they quickly rekindle their relationship. Happy as they are together, they cannot reconcile the different paths each has taken in life, and so they reluctantly decide to part again.

Souchak, seeing her off on the train, ends up traveling with her all the way back to Wyoming. After getting off at her stop, they decide that they cannot live without each other and decide to marry. Souchak catches the next train back to Chicago, but the newlyweds promise to meet again very soon.

== Cast ==
- John Belushi as Ernie Souchak
- Blair Brown as Nell Porter
- Allen Garfield as Howard McDermott (billed as Allen Goorwitz)
- Carlin Glynn as Sylvia McDermott
- Val Avery as Alderman Yablonowitz
- Tony Ganios as Max Bernbaum
- Liam Russell as Deke Lewis
- Bruce Jarchow as Hellinger
- Ron Dean as Plesko

== Production ==
=== Development ===
The Ernie Souchak character was loosely based on longtime Chicago newspaper columnist Mike Royko.

=== Filming ===
Many of the scenes were filmed around Chicago:

- Belushi's character works for the Chicago Sun-Times, with many scenes filmed in and around the now-demolished Sun-Times building on the Chicago River (now the site of Trump International Hotel and Tower).
- Belushi and Brown's characters meet in Chicago while she is giving a lecture at the Field Museum of Natural History next to Lake Michigan.

Many of the mountain scenes were filmed in Colorado in Custer County.

Other scenes were filmed at:

- Railroad station in Chicago was not Union Station, but the old Chicago & Northwestern Terminal (now called the Ogilvie Transportation Center) made up to look like an Amtrak station. Amtrak does not operate out of this terminal.
- The train depot where Belushi's character says goodbye to Brown's character, but later gets back on the train is the Michigan Central Railroad Niles Depot in Niles, Michigan about 90 miles east of Chicago. It's a large sandstone building built in 1892. The depot appeared in Midnight Run with Robert De Niro and Only the Lonely with Maureen O'Hara and John Candy.
- Glacier National Park, Montana.
- All tent scenes were Crystal Mountain, Washington, a ski area near Mount Rainier, 40 miles (64 km) south of Enumclaw. The site was at 6,872 feet (2,095 m) in elevation, and the snow was real, but behind the cameras was the Summit House restaurant at the top of the chairlift.
- The final scene of the film takes place in "Victor, Wyoming" but is actually the old Cedar Falls train depot by Rattlesnake Lake near North Bend, WA. The station building is now gone (apparently now being used as a house in Covington) and the railroad line is now Palouse to Cascades State Park Trail, a popular biking route.

== Soundtrack ==
Singer Helen Reddy performed the "Theme from Continental Divide (We Will Never Say Goodbye)".

== Reception ==
Continental Divide holds a score of 73% on film review aggregator website Rotten Tomatoes, based on 11 reviews with an average rating of 6.2/10. On Metacritic, the film holds a weighted average score of 64 out of 100 based on seven critics, indicating "generally favorable" reviews.
