= Wyatt Knight =

American actor (1955–2011)

- Knight portraying Tommy Turner in the movie Porky's II: The Next Day (1983)
- Born: January 20, 1955
- Died: October 25, 2011 (aged 56); Maui, Hawaii, U.S.
- Occupation: Actor
- Years active: 1979–2010
- Spouse: Silvina Knight
- Children: 2

Wyatt Knight (January 20, 1955 – October 25, 2011) was an American actor, best known for his role as Tommy Turner in the Porky's trilogy.

== Career ==
In addition to his work in the Porky's films, Knight made guest appearances on numerous TV shows including The Waltons, M*A*S*H, Family Ties, Profiler, Chicago Hope and Star Trek: The Next Generation. His final TV appearance came in 2010 on the show Crafty.

== Death ==
According to Knight's wife Silvina, in a statement given to entertainment news website TheWrap, he had a bone marrow transplant for advanced non-Hodgkin's lymphoma in 2003. However, intense cancer treatment including radiation left him, in the words of his wife, "in physical and emotional pain." On October 26, 2011 Wyatt Knight's body was discovered in a remote area on the island of Maui, Hawaii. Knight was a resident of Los Angeles, California but had recently been staying at a house on Maui.

According to the Associated Press, autopsy results indicated Knight died of a self-inflicted gunshot wound. In addition to his wife, Knight was survived by two children from a previous marriage.

== Filmography ==
Year	Title	Role	Notes
1981	Rivals	Car Clubber 2	
1981	Porky's	Tommy Turner	
1983	Porky's II: The Next Day	Tommy Turner	
1985	Porky's Revenge!	Tommy Turner	
