= Dan Monahan =

American actor

- Born: July 20, 1955 (age 70); Ohio, United States
- Occupation: Actor
- Years active: 1978–2000
- Spouse: Sharon Killius (m. 1982)
- Children: 1

Dan Monahan (born July 20, 1955) is an American actor, best known for his role as Edward "Pee Wee" Morris in the 1980s Porky's trilogy of teen films. He appeared in Only When I Laugh and Porky's in 1981.

== Early and personal life ==
Monahan graduated from Olmsted Falls High School in Olmsted Falls, Ohio. Then he majored in business and drama at Ohio University.

Monahan married a teacher, Sharon Killius, in September 1982, and has a daughter.

== Filmography ==
- Paradiso Blu (1980) – Peter
- The Adventures of Huckleberry Finn (1981) – Tom Sawyer
- Only When I Laugh (1981) – Jason
- Porky's (1981) – Edward "Pee Wee" Morris
- Porky's II: The Next Day (1983) – Edward "Pee Wee" Morris
- Up the Creek (1984) – Max
- Porky's Revenge! (1985) – Edward "Pee Wee" Morris
- From the Hip (1987) – Larry
- The Prince of Pennsylvania (1988) – Tommy Rutherford
- The Night Flier (1997) – Merton Morrison
- Shattered Illusions (1998) – Mark
- Baby Geniuses (1999) – Reporter
- Romeo and Juliet (2000) – Friar Lawrence
