= Eric Christmas =

English actor (1916–2000)

- Eric Christmas on The Golden Palace, 1993
- Born: Eric Cuthbert Christmas; 19 March 1916; London, England
- Died: 22 July 2000 (aged 84); Camarillo, California, U.S.
- Resting place: Santa Barbara Cemetery
- Occupation: Actor
- Years active: 1938–2000
- Spouse(s): Donelda Marion Neufeld (1958–1982; divorced; 2 children); Marcia J. (Marcy) Mattox (?–2000; his death)

Eric Cuthbert Christmas (19 March 1916 – 22 July 2000) was an English actor, with over 40 films and numerous television roles to his credit. He is probably best known for his role as Mr. Carter, the principal of Angel Beach High School, in the 1981 comedy films Porky's, the 1983 sequel Porky's II: The Next Day, and the 1985 sequel Porky's Revenge!. He was also known for his sporadic role as Reverend Diddymoe in the NBC sitcom Amen.

== Life and career ==
Christmas was born in London, England, and later emigrated to Canada. He was a foundational performer at the Stratford Festival, acting in 12 seasons and 21 Shakespearean productions between 1957 and 1970. He served as the artistic director of the Ottawa Repertory Company in 1954 and ran the Peterborough Summer Theatre. He frequently collaborated with Canadian comedy duo Wayne and Shuster and toured Canada with his own show, "Christmas is Coming," in the 1950s.

His role as a priest in the 1971 film Harold and Maude includes a memorable monologue to an off-camera Harold, in which he discusses, with increasing nausea and disgust, how the thought of Harold's sexual affair with a much older woman "makes [him] want...to vomit." His also had film roles in Monte Walsh (1970), The Andromeda Strain (1971), Johnny Got His Gun (1971), The Last Tycoon (1976), An Enemy of the People (1978), Attack of the Killer Tomatoes (1978), The Changeling (1980), Middle Age Crazy (1980), The Philadelphia Experiment (1984), and All of Me (1984). Christmas even had a rare leading role in the 1987 Canadian independent screwball comedy Home Is Where the Hart Is. He also appeared in Bugsy (1991), Almost Dead (1994), Air Bud (1997), and his final feature film, Mouse Hunt (1997).

Christmas also made guest appearances on many television shows, including Columbo (as a sardonic jeweler in "A Friend in Deed"), Adventures in Rainbow Country, Due South, ER, Misfits of Science, Night Court, The Fresh Prince of Bel-Air, Wiseguy (as Harry "The Hunch" Shanstra), ALF (as Bernie, one of the residents of a retirement home, in the episode "When I'm 64"), Seinfeld (as Jeffrey Haarwood in the episode "The Gum"), Cheers, Home Improvement (as Sir Larry the Magician), Coach (as Brian Currie), The Golden Palace, The X-Files, Booker, Matlock, Walker Texas Ranger, Roseanne, L.A. Law (as Buzz Carr), Major Dad, Ally McBeal and Amen. From 1995-96 he played Father Francis on Days of Our Lives, a key role in the infamous possession of Marlena Evans.

He went to San Diego to teach and to help revive the La Jolla Playhouse, for which he directed The Man Who Came to Dinner in temporary space at La Jolla High School, with equity actor Larry Seaman in the lead role, and also starring Robert Zimmerman (BHP-San Francisco Faculty) as the reporter and James Pearson as Banjo. Christmas also acted in and directed productions of San Diego, California's Old Globe Theatre's Shakespeare Festivals for many years. In 1983 Christmas played and sang the role of "Jack Point" in the San Diego Gilbert and Sullivan Repertory Company's production of The Yeomen of the Guard.

During the 1970s and 1980s, Christmas was a drama professor at the University of California, San Diego, and made theatrical presentations at local high schools, including La Jolla Country Day School.

== Death ==
Christmas died on 22 July 2000, from natural causes at the age of 84. He was interred at the Santa Barbara Cemetery at Santa Barbara, California.

== Filmography ==
- Bonanza (1969, Episode: "Dead Wrong") .... Bobby Dan
- Monte Walsh (1970) .... Colonel Wilson
- The Andromeda Strain (1971) .... Senator from Vermont
- Johnny Got His Gun (1971) .... Corporal Timlon
- The Men From Shiloh (rebranded name of The Virginian 1971, TV series) .... Parker
- Harold and Maude (1971) .... Priest
- Columbo (1974, Episode: "A Friend in Deed") .... Bruno Wexler
- The Last Tycoon (1976) .... Norman
- Code Name: Diamond Head (1977) .... Father Murphy
- An Enemy of the People (1978) .... Morten Kiil
- Attack of the Killer Tomatoes (1978) .... Senator Polk
- The Changeling (1980) .... Albert Harmon
- Middle Age Crazy (1980) .... Tommy
- Porky's (1981) .... Mr. Carter
- Porky's II: The Next Day (1983) .... Mr. Carter
- The Philadelphia Experiment (1984) .... Dr. James Longstreet
- All of Me (1984) .... Fred Hoskins
- Porky's Revenge! (1985) .... Mr. Carter
- Happy Hour (1986) .... Harry The Guard
- Home Is Where the Hart Is (1987) .... Martin Hart
- Cheers (1988, TV series) .... Father Barry
- Amen (1989) .... Reverend Diddymoe
- Night Court (1990) .... Pops Durkin
- Whispers (1990) .... Joshua Rinehart
- Bugsy (1991) .... Ronald the Butler
- The Fresh Prince of Bel-Air (1991) .... Cecil
- Home Improvement (Oct. 1, 1991) .... Sir Larry Houdini
- Dead in the Water (1991) .... Judge Griffin
- Wings (1992) .... Liam MacDougal
- Ed and His Dead Mother (1993) .... Mr. Abner
- Naked Gun 33 1/3: The Final Insult (1994) .... Prison Chaplain (scenes deleted)
- Almost Dead (1994) .... Father Ambrose
- The X-Files (1994) .... Stan
- Seinfeld (1995, TV series) .... Geoffrey Haarwood
- Air Bud (1997) .... Judge Cranfield
- Mouse Hunt (1997) .... Ernie and Lars' Lawyer - Final film role
