= Mark Herrier =

American actor and film director (born 1954)

- Born: October 6, 1954 (age 71); Lompoc, California, United States
- Occupation: Actor
- Years active: 1981–2019

Mark Herrier (born October 6, 1954) is an American actor and film director, best known for his role as Billy in the 1980s teen trilogy Porky's.

He has also appeared on M*A*S*H, Freddy's Nightmares, Paradise, Murder, She Wrote, The Practice, and Gideon's Crossing. In 2013, he was expected to star in the film Daddies' Girls, with much of the Porky's original cast.

== Filmography ==
| Year | Title | Role | Notes |
|---|---|---|---|
| 1981 | Porky's | Billy McCarty | |
| 1983 | Porky's II: The Next Day | Billy McCarty | |
| 1984 | Tank | Elliott | |
| 1985 | Porky's Revenge! | Billy McCarty | |
| 1987 | Real Men | Bradshaw | |
| 1991 | Popcorn | Director | |
| 2019 | Bosch | Captain Dennis Cooper | |
