= Kaki Hunter =

American actress, architect, and writer (born 1955)

- Born: Katherine Susan Hunter; November 6, 1955 (age 70); Silver Spring, Maryland, United States
- Occupations: Actress; architect; writer
- Years active: 1977–1991

Kaki Hunter (born Katherine Susan Hunter; November 6, 1955) is an American actress, architect, and writer, perhaps best known for her role in the trilogy of Porky's films in the 1980s.

== Life and career ==
Hunter was born in Silver Spring, Maryland. She received accolades for her second ever role, as one of the three sisters in the 1977 West German film Maiden's War. Her performance earned the gold award for Best Young Actress from Germany's Deutscher Filmpreis, and the award for Best Actress at Spain's San Sebastián International Film Festival.

Hunter starred as the female lead in Roadie (1980), followed by roles in Willie & Phil (1980), Whose Life Is It Anyway? (1981) and Just the Way You Are (1984).

Hunter also appeared in guest roles on television, including the 1979 episode "The Execution File" of the television series Hawaii Five-O, the 1982 episode "Weekend" on the anthology series American Playhouse, and the 1991 episode "Writer Wrong" of the series Tropical Heat, her last role before retiring from acting.

Hunter received her greatest attention for the role of Wendy Williams, the female lead among the group of high schoolers in the 1981 hit film Porky's, returning to the role in Porky's II: The Next Day (1983) and Porky's Revenge! (1985).

After she retired from acting, Hunter became a teacher of white water rafting in Utah. She is the author of the how-to book Earthbag Building.

She was also active in the community theater in Moab, Utah.
