= Porky's =

1981 teen sex comedy film by Bob Clark

- U.S. theatrical release poster
- Directed by: Bob Clark
- Written by: Bob Clark
- Produced by: Don Carmody; Bob Clark
- Starring: Kim Cattrall; Scott Colomby; Kaki Hunter; Nancy Parsons; Alex Karras; Susan Clark
- Cinematography: Reginald H. Morris
- Edited by: Stan Cole
- Music by: Paul Zaza; Carl Zittrer
- Production company: Astral Films
- Distributed by: 20th Century-Fox
- Release dates: November 13, 1981 (Columbia, South Carolina); March 19, 1982 (United States and Canada)
- Running time: 98 minutes
- Country: Canada
- Language: English
- Budget: $4–5 million
- Box office: $160 million

Porky's is a 1981 Canadian sex comedy film written and directed by Bob Clark about the escapades of teenagers in 1954 at the fictional Angel Beach High School in Florida. The film stars Kim Cattrall, Scott Colomby, Kaki Hunter, Nancy Parsons, Alex Karras, and Susan Clark.

The film influenced many writers in the teen film genre and spawned two sequels: Porky's II: The Next Day (1983) and Porky's Revenge! (1985), and the followup Porky's: Pimpin' Pee Wee (2009). Porky's was the sixth highest-grossing film of 1982. The film received generally positive reviews at the time of its release.

== Plot ==
In 1954, each boy in a group of Florida Angel Beach High School students plans to lose his virginity. They go to Porky's, a strip club in the Everglades, believing that they can hire a prostitute to satisfy their sexual desires. The club's proprietor, Porky Wallace, takes their money but humiliates the boys by dumping them into the swamp. When the group demands their money back, Sheriff Wallace, Porky's brother, drives them away but not before he extorts them for the rest of their money, further embarrassing them.

After Mickey Jarvis, who returned to Porky's for revenge, is beaten so badly he has to be hospitalized, the gang becomes hellbent on exacting revenge on Porky and Sheriff Wallace, eventually sinking Porky's establishment into the swamp. Porky and his men, joined by Sheriff Wallace, chase the group, but the boys make it across the county line, out of Sheriff Wallace's jurisdiction, where local police officers and the high school band meet them. One of the officers, Mickey's older brother, Ted, repeatedly damages Porky's Hudson Hornet, promising to drop all charges against Porky for driving an unsafe vehicle if the night's events are forgiven. Because the boys are too young to have been allowed into Porky's legally, Porky and Sheriff Wallace agree.

In a subplot, the boys peep on female students in the girl's locker room shower, and Tommy Turner, Billy McCarty, and Pee Wee Morris see several girls showering. Pee Wee gives them away when he shouts at an obese girl, who has been blocking his view, to move so that he can see. While a few girls run out, most stay, finding the situation funny. To test their attitude, Tommy sticks his tongue out through his peephole but gets it smeared with soap. Infuriated, he drops his pants and sticks his penis through the opening just before female coach Beulah Balbricker, who has a running feud with Tommy, walks into the shower area. Spotting the protruding member, she sneaks up on Tommy, grabs his penis, and pulls with all her might. Tommy pulls free and escapes, but Beulah is determined to prove that the offending member, which has a mole on it, belongs to Tommy, going so far as to request that Principal Carter hold a police-type line-up of the boys in the nude so she can identify it. However, Carter balks at her request. As the other basketball coaches laugh, Coach Roy Brackett suggests asking the police to send a sketch artist and hang wanted posters around the school. When that suggestion gets even Carter laughing, Balbricker leaves in a huff. At the end of the film, she sneaks out of the bushes to ambush Tommy and actually drags his pants down, but she is pulled off him by police and dragged away screaming that she saw "it" and that she can identify its owner. Tommy breaks the fourth wall, saying, "Jeez!" to the camera.

Another subplot involves Coach Brackett taking an interest in the attractive coach, Lynn Honeywell. Coach Fred Warren repeatedly refers to Honeywell as "Lassie" while pointing to the equipment room, much to Coach Brackett's confusion. He quickly finds out why when he and Honeywell hide out in the equipment room after an argument with Balbricker, and Honeywell becomes turned on by the scent of the room. This leads to the pair having quickie sex in the room, as Honeywell begins loudly howling like a dog, thus revealing why she is called Lassie. Her orgasmic howls are heard throughout the entire school, much to the students' and Coach Warren's amusement, but not to Balbricker and head coach Goodenough. Brackett and Honeywell are eventually fired as a result.

== Cast ==
- Dan Monahan as Edward "Pee Wee" Morris
- Mark Herrier as Billy McCarty
- Wyatt Knight as Tommy Turner
- Roger Wilson as Mickey Jarvis
- Cyril O'Reilly as Tim Cavanaugh
- Tony Ganios as Anthony "Meat" Tuperello
- Kaki Hunter as Wendy Williams
- Kim Cattrall as Miss Lynn "Lassie" Honeywell
- Nancy Parsons as Coach Beulah Balbricker
- Scott Colomby as Brian Schwartz
- Boyd Gaines as Coach Roy Brackett
- Doug McGrath as Coach Fred Warren
- Susan Clark as Cherry Forever
- Art Hindle as Ted Jarvis
- Wayne Maunder as "Slime" Cavanaugh
- Alex Karras as Sheriff Wallace
- Chuck Mitchell as "Porky" Wallace
- Eric Christmas as Mr. Carter
- Jack Mulcahy as Frank Bell
- Bill Hindman as Coach Goodenough
- Pat Finn-Lee as Stripper

== Production ==
Bob Clark got the idea to make Porky's in 1972. It was based on his experiences with five high school friends in Florida in the 1950s. He based the story on actual occurrences at Boca Ciega High School in Gulfport, Florida, and Fort Lauderdale High School in the early 1960s, and on a venue called Porky's Hide Away in Oakland Park, Florida.

Clark teamed up with Roger Swaybill on a film, Breaking Point. When Clark fell ill with mononucleosis in 1979, he dictated the story of Porky's to Swaybill, who then wrote a draft of the script. Every studio in Hollywood turned down the project. Clark eventually obtained financing from Melvin Simon Productions and a Canadian firm, Astral Bellevue Pathe. The film had to be partly made in Canada to obtain government tax benefits, but was also shot at multiple locations in Florida at Miami and Miami Beach. This meant Clark, who was an American, got sole screen credit as writer. However, Swaybill was reimbursed with a six-figure sum and was co-writer on the sequel.

"It seems incredible to realize that Porky's, which earned more than $200 million worldwide, was done as a tax shelter, but that's the way it was," Swaybill says. Kim Cattrall took a small role in the film because she needed the money, and was horrified, at first, to see her name at the top of the poster: "People thought it was the end of my career."

== Release ==
Porky's was released in Colorado Springs, Colorado and Columbia, South Carolina, on November 13, 1981. It then received a wide release in Canada and the United States on March 19, 1982.

In Ireland, the film was banned on February 1, 1982; the decision was overturned 19 days later.

=== Critical response ===
Upon its release, Porky's was viewed as "a likeable lowbrow coming-of-age comedy", but the critical appraisal has been more negative since then, with many critics citing the humor as having a misogynistic and poorly aged base and lacking the context or nuance to generate humor that could stand the test of time. Review aggregation website Rotten Tomatoes, which collects both contemporary and modern reviews, gives the film a score of 34% based on reviews from 41 critics. The consensus reads, "Gleeful in its misogyny and celebratory of bad behavior, Porky's is an intermittently funny farce that will leave audiences feeling in need of a shower." On Metacritic the film has a score of 40% based on reviews from 8 critics, indicating "mixed or average reviews".

Film critics Gene Siskel and Roger Ebert in their syndicated At the Movies television series both expressed disdain for Porky's and later called it one of the worst films of 1982. In particular, they criticized the film for what they viewed as its objectification and degradation of women and the childish nature of its antagonists, and they disliked that the film took what they felt was a thin, shallow and off-color stance against antisemitism. In his print review for the Chicago Sun-Times, Ebert noted that the film's sexual content per se was not the film's failing, but rather the manner it was used: "Even in an easy scene like the one where the guys spy on the girls in the locker room, the director, Bob Clark, blows it. Peeping Tom scenes can be very funny (remember John Belushi on the ladder in Animal House?) Here, it's just smarmy." Siskel would later go on to call it one of the worst films ever made.

=== Box office ===
The film grossed $7.6 million for the weekend when it opened wide in 1982. It grossed a total of $106 million in its initial release in the United States and Canada, including $12 million in Canada. It grossed $25–30 million overseas, for a worldwide gross of over $130 million. Although it was written and directed by an American and was filmed in Miami and Miami Beach, Florida, Porky's was produced by the Canadian company Astral Media. As a result, Porky's can be classed as the highest-grossing Canadian film of all time in the United States and Canada, with a total of C$111 million by 1999, including $6 million from a 1983 re-issue prior to the release of the sequel.

Including the re-issue, the film grossed $160 million worldwide.

=== Home media ===
Porky's was released on VHS in July 1983, by Fox Video. It proved successful in the video rental market, finishing in the top 40 video rentals of 1983 in the United States.

On May 22, 2007, 20th Century Fox Home Entertainment released all three films in an "Ultimate Collection" box set on DVD.

The DVD of the film from the "Ultimate Collection" was also released as a stand-alone release called the "One Size Fits All" Edition and includes a retrospective featurette with Bob Clark, a discussion on how Porky's is a comedy classic, movie commentary by Clark, the theatrical trailer, two television spots, trailers for Porky's II: The Next Day and Porky's Revenge!, and the sales pitch for the Porky's video game.

Porky's was released on Blu-ray on September 25, 2012. The bonus material for the Blu-ray is the bonus material from the "One Size Fits All" Edition that focuses on the movie itself. The trailers for Porky's II: The Next Day and Porky's Revenge!, and the Porky's video game sales pitch were not included as bonus materials for the Blu-ray release.

== Sequels and additional media ==
The first two Porky's films were directed by Bob Clark and produced by Harold Greenberg, who founded Astral Communications (now known as Astral Media). Following the success of Porky's in North America and Europe, a sequel, Porky's II: The Next Day, was released in 1983. It was poorly received by critics and was less commercially successful than the original. Clark did not want to make another film in the series, so director James Komack made the third and last part of the saga. The third film, Porky's Revenge!, was the worst-received of the series both critically and commercially. Although it was not originally part of the series, the film Hollywood Zap! was released as a Porky's film in Europe.

A video game based on the film, also titled Porky's, was released for the Atari 2600 and Atari 8-bit computers by 20th Century Fox in 1983.

== Remake ==
=== Howard Stern remake ===
In 2002, Howard Stern acquired the remake rights and has long hoped to produce a remake of the film. The potential remake ran into legal trouble in 2011 when two other production companies stepped forward claiming to own the rights. In 2013, the parties reached a confidential settlement and agreed to dismiss a claim and counterclaim with prejudice. The terms of the settlement remain confidential, and to date, it is unknown if they allow for Stern's remake to be made.

=== Porky's: Pimpin' Pee Wee ===
In 1994 Lontano Investments purchased the rights to Porky's and in 2001, the company signed a contract with Mola Entertainment, giving the latter the exclusive right to produce a Porky's film in exchange for 1.5% of the budget of the picture, less option fees. The agreement also gave Mola the right to produce another sequel if it satisfied the conditions of its deal, including completing the first picture within five years and paying the purchase fee in whole. This agreement was subsequently amended a number of times, extending the time and increasing the purchase fee from 1.5% of the budget to 2.5%. Mola originally wanted to make a film with a budget of around $10 million but were unable to raise the finance and created the film with a budget of approximately $500,000. It decided to make a film in 2009 for under $1 million before its rights expired. It was originally entitled Porky's: The College Years and was later retitled Porky's: Pimpin' Pee Wee.

"As time was running out they thought let's whip up this cheap one and bury it," said Brian Trenchard-Smith, who was hired to direct four weeks before shooting began.

Shooting took place over 15 days on location in Canyon Country, California, and at a studio in Simi Valley, California, starting in October 2008. The director says the film was "designed as an homage to the 80's sex-comedies where there are raging hormones that cause characters to defy logic and moral scruples in the search for the Holy Grail, which is to get laid. A desperate attempt to get laid."

Porky's: Pimpin' Pee Wee was released via video on demand but did not receive a release to DVD. Mola then claimed they had fulfilled their obligations under their contract with Lontano and retained rights to make another sequel. However, Lontano subsequently claimed that the film required a budget of $10 million to satisfy the arrangement. A lawsuit ensued, affecting plans by Howard Stern to make his own remake as Mola maintained it held rights on Porky's until April 1, 2014.
