= Porky's Revenge! =

1985 film by James Komack

- Theatrical release poster
- Directed by: James Komack
- Written by: Ziggy Steinberg
- Based on: Characters by Bob Clark
- Produced by: Robert L. Rosen
- Starring: Dan Monahan; Wyatt Knight; Tony Ganios; Mark Herrier; Kaki Hunter; Scott Colomby; Nancy Parsons; Chuck Mitchell
- Cinematography: Robert C. Jessup
- Edited by: John W. Wheeler
- Music by: Dave Edmunds
- Distributed by: 20th Century Fox; Astral Films
- Release date: March 22, 1985
- Running time: 93 minutes
- Countries: United States; Canada
- Language: English
- Budget: $7.8 million
- Box office: $20,518,905

Porky's Revenge! is a 1985 sex comedy film and the third and final film of the original Porky's film series. It was directed by James Komack. The film stars Dan Monahan, Wyatt Knight, Tony Ganios, Mark Herrier, Kaki Hunter, Scott Colomby, Nancy Parsons and Chuck Mitchell.

Despite being the weakest Porky's film in terms of critical reception, it was a moderate box office success, grossing $20 million on a budget of $7 million.

== Plot ==
During the semi-final basketball game, the cheerleaders promise the team an orgy if they win. The boys do so. After the game, they are led to Connie's, one of the cheerleaders, house, and everyone strips down to their underwear and jumps in a swimming pool. In it, the girls throw their underwear out. The boys do likewise, and swim toward the girls. Soon, but too late, they realize the girls are clothed after all and wind up parading nude before the clothed girls and their parents.

Porky Mitchell now owns a riverboat with a casino and strip club. According to Brian Schwartz, he is extorting money from Coach Goodenough because he has a gambling debt. The gang decide to go to the boat to take pictures of the illegal casino to give to the district attorney. During this time, Meat Tuperello runs into Porky's sex-crazed daughter, Blossom, who forces herself on him. The boys' plan fails because Porky catches them in the act and is about to kill them. But when they mention the State Championship game, he realizes that they could help him out by throwing the game so he can bet against them.

Later at school, Meat is unable to dissect a frog in science class. Fearing he could become academically ineligible to play in the championship game, the gang goes to Miss Webster's apartment to get a copy of the final exam. They discover her and Mr. Dobish, the school's guidance counselor, having rather kinky extramarital relations.

A letter is written to Coach Beulah Balbricker arranging a rendezvous at a motel with Snooky Kelton, an old boyfriend of hers, while Pee Wee Morris is enticed to the same room by the promise of a night of passion with Inga, a beautiful Swedish exchange student. Tommy Turner tricks Pee Wee into going to another location while he heads to the room. Balbricker arrives first followed by Tommy, and they are horrified to find themselves unclothed and in bed with each other. To make up for their prank on Balbricker, the gang contacts Snooky and actually gets them together.

Before the final game, Meat is benched because Miss Webster intentionally failed him. Mr. Dobish discovers the blackmail photos and a note and shows Miss Webster, causing her to change her mind. The second half results in a victory for Angel Beach while Porky is outraged. Blossom tells him that Meat is her boyfriend and they "went all the way," infuriating him even more. He then suggests to his two subordinates that Meat and Blossom get married.

During the senior prom, Meat is abducted by Porky and his men. The gang goes after them. Just as the wedding is about to start, the power goes out and Meat is freed by Billy McCarty and Brian. They begin their escape in a motorboat, with Porky's boat chasing them closely. The chase ends after they make it through a drawbridge, with Pee Wee then lowering it, resulting in the destruction of Porky's boat.

At graduation, the guys trick Pee Wee into taking off all his clothes, except his graduation gown. As he is about to get his diploma, Principal Carter steps on the gown, causing it to come off and reveal Pee Wee in his nudity, just as he dreamed at the beginning of the film.

== Cast ==
- Dan Monahan as Edward "Pee Wee" Morris
- Mark Herrier as Billy McCarty
- Wyatt Knight as Tommy Turner
- Kaki Hunter as Wendy Williams
- Tony Ganios as Anthony "Meat" Tuperello
- Scott Colomby as Brian Schwartz
- Nancy Parsons as Ms. Beulah Balbricker
- Eric Christmas as Mr. Carter
- Chuck Mitchell as "Porky" Wallace
- Kimberly Evenson as Inga
- Nancy Hassinger as Pee Wee's Grandmother
- Rose McVeigh as Miss Webster
- Wendy Feign as Blossom Wallace
- Fred Buch as Mr. Dobish
- Ilse Earl as Mrs. Morris
- Bill Hindman as Coach Goodenough
- Heidi Helmer as Connie
- Sandy Mielke as Snooky Kelton
- Ron Campbell as Crutcher
- Mal Jones as Bridge Guard

== Production ==
The film's budget was nearly $8 million, much of which was spent on building a large gambling boat. The producers used a $20 million Miami mansion, Vizcaya, as a key setting.

The film was the directorial debut of James Komack, who stated "I'm not going to whitewash the bawdiness or clean up the tone of their antics."

Komack thought the sequel, "failed to understand their own formula. Porky's touched on reality, it presented a cross-section of adolescent sex life during a certain time frame. Bob apparently tried to elevate his big success and use it to portray a message. But the original was not a film about humanity; it was a film, pure and simple, about teen-age sex. The sequel, a whitewash of the original, didn't play."

Nancy Parsons had lost a considerable amount of weight since the first film. She agreed to appear in the sequel for a percentage of the profits.

== Reception ==
=== Box office ===
The film was the lowest-grossing film in the series with $20,518,905, a substantial drop from the first film's box office of $105.5 million.

=== Critical response ===
The film received negative reviews from critics, with review aggregator Rotten Tomatoes gave it a score of 23% based on reviews from 13 critics. Gene Siskel gave it zero stars out of four, writing that "the comedy here operates at the stag party level... a 1950 stag party." Roger Ebert loathed the film, with himself and Siskel agreeing the movie "hates women" on their TV show (where they put the film next to 3 other sequels both men hated, not even giving them a thumbs-down rating at the end), with Ebert saying Nancy Parsons did a fairly good job playing Miss Balbricker and that "it's not funny what (the kids in the film) are doing to her." Janet Maslin of The New York Times called it "just another brand-name teen-age movie ... Some of it is funny, but it's also entirely predictable." Variety noted that it "barely earns its R rating" and that James Komack's direction "does little to enliven the proceedings," calling the soundtrack "one of the film's few bright spots." Michael Wilmington of the Los Angeles Times called it "a sorry excuse for a movie: loud, lewd, witless and crass ... you might be advised to skip the movie and go directly to the sound-track album." Leonard Maltin's film guide assigned its lowest possible rating of BOMB and wrote, "Beware of high-school seniors with post-collegiate hairlines: these guys are starting to look older than the mid-'50s Bowery Boys. This revenge is preferable to Montezuma's—but not by much."

The film was nominated for a Stinkers Bad Movie Award for Worst Picture at the 1985 Stinkers Bad Movie Awards.

== Soundtrack ==
Porky's Revenge!

Soundtrack album by Various Artists
- Released: 1985
- Length: 32:50
- Labels: Sony; Columbia
- Producer: Dave Edmunds

Singles from Porky's Revenge!
- 1. "High School Nights" Released: 1985; 2. "Do You Want to Dance?" Released: 1985

Professional ratings
Review scores
| Source | Rating |
|---|---|
| AllMusic | link |

The film's soundtrack was released in 1985. Produced and assembled by Dave Edmunds, it features new material from a wide spectrum of well-established rock and roll musicians, including Jeff Beck, George Harrison, Carl Perkins, Willie Nelson and Robert Plant & Phil Collins (under "The Crawling King Snakes" moniker), as well as then up-and-comers The Fabulous Thunderbirds.

Besides George Harrison's recording of a previously unreleased Bob Dylan song ("I Don't Want to Do It") and Dave Edmunds' "High School Nights" and Porky's Revenge! theme music, it consists of newly recorded versions of classic rock and roll tunes (sometimes by their original author, in the case of Carl Perkins). Stephen Thomas Erlewine of AllMusic called it "far more fun than the accompanying film" and said, although disliking some of the 1980s production flourishes, "it's far better to dwell on the fact that a third-rate sequel like Porky's Revenge! could produce a soundtrack this good, because that is a mystery for the ages."

"High School Nights" b/w "Porky's Revenge" and "Do You Want to Dance?" b/w "I Don't Want to Do It" were released as singles.

== Track listing ==
| No. | Title | Writer(s) | Performer | Length |
|---|---|---|---|---|
| 1. | "High School Nights" | Dave Edmunds, John David, Steve Gould | Dave Edmunds | 3:11 |
| 2. | "Do You Want to Dance?" | Bobby Freeman | Dave Edmunds | 2:32 |
| 3. | "Sleepwalk" | Santo & Johnny | Jeff Beck | 2:19 |
| 4. | "I Don't Want to Do It" | Bob Dylan | George Harrison | 2:54 |
| 5. | "Stagger Lee" | | The Fabulous Thunderbirds | 2:56 |
| 6. | "Blue Suede Shoes" | Carl Perkins | Carl Perkins | 2:23 |
| 7. | "Peter Gunn Theme" | Henry Mancini | Clarence Clemons | 2:36 |
| 8. | "Queen of the Hop" | Bobby Darin | Dave Edmunds | 2:15 |
| 9. | "Love Me Tender" | Elvis Presley, Vera Matson | Willie Nelson | 2:32 |
| 10. | "Philadelphia Baby" | Charlie Rich | The Crawling King Snakes | 2:18 |
| 11. | "Porky's Revenge!" | Dave Edmunds | Dave Edmunds | 4:46 |

Original Master Recording Bonus Track
| No. | Title | Writer(s) | Performer | Length |
|---|---|---|---|---|
| 12. | "High School Nights" (Reprise) | Dave Edmunds | Dave Edmunds | 2:27 |

2004 Reissue Bonus Tracks
| No. | Title | Writer(s) | Performer | Length |
|---|---|---|---|---|
| 12. | "Honey Don't" | Carl Perkins | Carl Perkins | 2:48 |
| 13. | "Don't Call Me Tonight" | Dave Edmunds | Dave Edmunds | 2:28 |
