= Angel on My Shoulder (1980 film) =

- Genre: Fantasy
- Written by: Harry Julian Fink; Rita M. Fink
- Directed by: John Berry
- Starring: Peter Strauss; Richard Kiley; Barbara Hershey
- Country of origin: United States
- Original language: English

Production
- Producer: Jay Weston
- Cinematography: Gayne Rescher
- Editor: David Newhouse
- Running time: 100 minutes
- Production company: Jay Weston Productions

Original release
- Network: NBC
- Release: May 11, 1980

Angel on My Shoulder is a 1980 American fantasy made-for-television film directed by John Berry and starring Peter Strauss, Richard Kiley, and Barbara Hershey. It is a remake of the 1946 film of the same name.

== Plot ==
A deceased criminal named Eddie is given a second chance at life when the Devil sends him back to Earth to corrupt a righteous judge. Posing as the judge, Eddie struggles between his old habits and a newfound sense of morality.

== Cast ==
- Peter Strauss as Eddie / Judge Gary Blake
- Richard Kiley as The Devil
- Barbara Hershey as Joanna
- Janet MacLachlan as Mrs. Anderson
- Earl Boen as Dr. Herman
- Edwin Craig as Frank Lewis

== Production ==
The film was produced by Jay Weston and aired on NBC on May 11, 1980. The screenplay was written by Harry Julian Fink and Rita M. Fink, known for their work on Dirty Harry. Cinematography was handled by Gayne Rescher.

== Reception ==
While the film did not receive widespread critical attention, it was noted in television film guides for its performances and as a notable remake.

== See also ==
- Angel on My Shoulder (1946 film)
