= Bill Hindman =

American actor

- Born: July 15, 1922; Toledo, Ohio
- Died: July 9, 1999 (aged 76); Hialeah, Florida
- Occupation: Actor

William Hindman (July 15, 1922 – July 9, 1999) was an American actor primarily in the major professional theatres in South Florida. He also appeared in New York City theater. Hindman, however, was best known for his role as the older, good-humored Coach Goodenough in 1980s teen film trilogy Porky's.

Hindman won a Carbonell Award, a prestigious award given to actors in South Florida, for his appearance in John DeGroot's Papa, in which he played the role of Ernest Hemingway.

Hindman was known by many in South Florida as the narrator of numerous planetarium shows written and produced by Jack Horkheimer at the Miami Space Transit Planetarium (now defunct). His first such project, 1972's "Child of the Universe", became one of the most successful planetarium shows of all time thanks to Hindman's sensitive and brilliant narration.

Hindman also hosted (and performed in) a video humanities survey course for what was then Miami-Dade Community College during the 1980s.

Hindman, a Toledo, OH native raised in Columbus, began acting while attending high school at the former North High School there and continued acting while majoring in Chinese at Ohio State University. After his discharge from the United States Marine Corps during World War II, he worked at Columbus' WCOL radio (also see WCOL-FM) and at WLW-C (now WCMH-TV), the city's NBC affiliate.

Hindman was the father of Miami Herald theatre critic Christine Dolen. He was also the brother of Hugh Hindman, former Ohio State University Athletic Director best known for terminating the employment of legendary Ohio State University football coach Woody Hayes in 1978.

== Filmography ==
| Year | Title | Role | Notes |
|---|---|---|---|
| 1980 | The Ordeal of Dr. Mudd | Pres. Andrew Johnson | TV movie starring Dennis Weaver https://www.imdb.com/title/tt0081281/?ref_=ttfc_fc_tt |
| 1980 | The Pilot | Roger | |
| 1981 | Nobody's Perfekt | Car Salesman | |
| 1981 | Porky's | Coach Goodenough | |
| 1981 | Absence of Malice | Priest | |
| 1983 | Porky's II: The Next Day | Coach Goodenough | |
| 1983 | Easy Money | Butler on Yacht | |
| 1983 | A Night in Heaven | Russel | |
| 1985 | Porky's Revenge! | Coach Goodenough | |
| 1986 | The Whoopee Boys | Grafspee | |
| 1987 | Scared Stiff | Dr. Ben Brightman | (final film role) |
