= Michelle Handelman =

American contemporary artist, filmmaker and writer

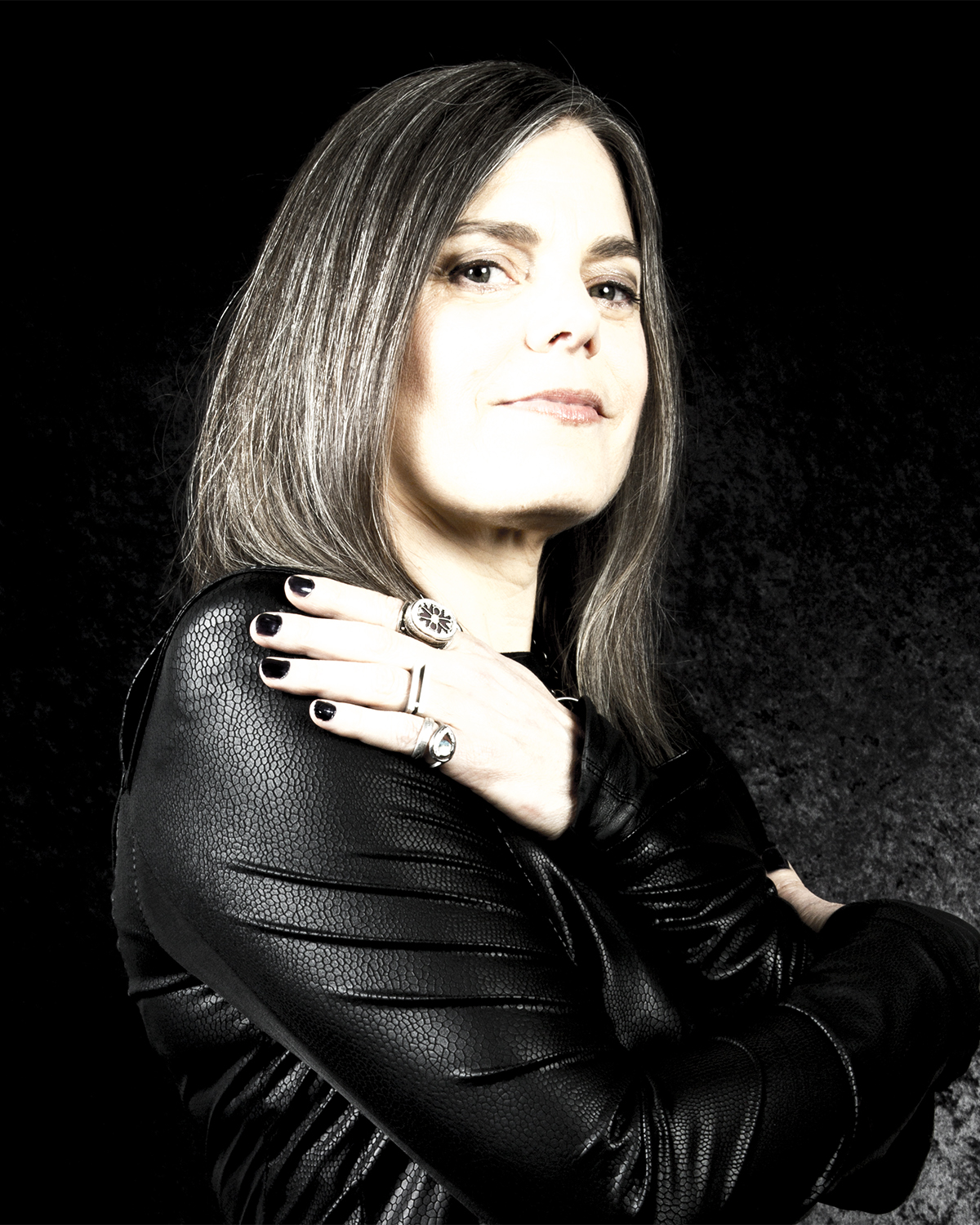
- Portrait of Handelman by Rachel Stern, 2017.
- Born: 1960 (age 65–66); Chicago, Illinois, U.S.
- Education: MFA Bard College, BFA San Francisco Art Institute
- Awards: John Simon Guggenheim Fellowship, Creative Capital, Art Matters
- Website: www.michellehandelman.com

Michelle Handelman (born August 5, 1960) is an American contemporary artist, filmmaker, and writer who works with live performance, multiscreen installation, photography and sound. Coming up through the years of the AIDS crisis and Culture Wars, Handelman has built a body of work that explores the dark and uncomfortable spaces of queer desire. She confronts the things that provoke collective fear and denial – sexuality, death, chaos. She directed the ground-breaking feature documentary on the 1990s San Francisco lesbian S/M scene BloodSisters: Leather, Dykes & Sadomasochism(1995), described by IndieWire as “a queer classic ahead of its time, a vital archive of queer history.” Her early work included 16mm black and white experimental films combined with performance. She is also known for her video installations Hustlers & Empires (2018), Irma Vep, The Last Breath (2013-2015), and Dorian, A Cinematic Perfume(2009-2011). In 2011, she was awarded a John Simon Guggenheim Memorial Fellowship for her film and video work.

== Life and career ==
Michelle Handelman was born August 5, 1960, as the youngest of three children in Chicago, Illinois. Her parents divorced when she was ten years old, and her father moved to Los Angeles to become part of the counterculture drug scene, while her mother stayed in Chicago and remarried several times, including a marriage to B.C. (Bud) Holland, a renowned Chicago art dealer. From 1974 to 1978, Michelle split her time between Chicago and Los Angeles.

During the early 1980s Handelman was based in Chicago where she attended the School of the Art Institute with classmates: contemporary artist Dread Scott; photographer James White; founder of Issue Project Room, Suzanne Fiol; artist and fashion designer J. Morgan Puett; and writer David Sedaris. From 1982-1985, Handelman worked as a bartender at Cabaret Metro/Smart Bar the premiere concert venue and underground club in Chicago which brought punk, industrial and New Wave musicians to Chicago.

From 1986 through 1998, Handelman was based in San Francisco, where she collaborated for many years with Monte Cazazza, a pioneer of the Industrial music scene. Together they created several bodies of work including The Torture Series (1994), which won the Sony Visions Award in 1995, the controversial film Catscan (1990), and The Cereal Box Conspiracy Against the Developing Mind (1994) for the cult anthology Apocalypse Culture. For several years they ran MMFilms, an independent distribution and film production company. While in San Francisco, she directed her feature documentary BloodSisters: Leather, Dykes, and Sadomasochism, winner of the UK Bravo Award. At this time, Handelman also performed in several films by pioneering artist Lynn Hershmann Leeson produced with ZDF/Arte including Twists in the Cord (1994), Virtual Love (1993), and Cut Piece (1993). She also collaborated with Eric Werner, co-founder of the industrial performance group Survival Research Laboratories and worked on Jon Moritsugu’s production Terminal USA (1994). Other collaborators during this period included artists from Re/Search Publications and members of the Industrial bands Throbbing Gristle, Coil, Psychic TV, and SPK.

In 1998, Handelman started to live full-time in New York City.

Handelman received her M.F.A. from Bard College (2000) and her B.F.A. from the San Francisco Art Institute (1990). She was an associate professor at the Massachusetts College of Art and Design from 2007 to 2013. In 2013, she was hired as a full professor at the Fashion Institute of Technology in New York City, where she helped found the FIT Film and Media undergraduate program. In 2023, she retired from FIT.

Handelman's work has screened and exhibited internationally, including the British Film Institute, London; Film Society of Lincoln Center, New York; Museum of Contemporary Art, Chicago; Participant Inc., New York; Performa Biennial, New York; Georges Pompidou Centre, Paris; Institute of Contemporary Arts, London; Guangzhou 53 Art Museum; San Francisco Museum of Modern Art; MIT List Visual Arts Center, Cambridge; Museum of Fine Arts, Boston; American Film Institute, Los Angeles and many other venues and film festivals. She is a John Simon Guggenheim Fellow (2011), and recipient of a Creative Capital award (2019). Beware The Lily Law, her moving image installation on transgender inmates, has been on permanent display at the Eastern State Penitentiary, Philadelphia since 2011. In 2018, the San Francisco Museum of Modern Art commissioned her film performance installation Hustlers & Empires, and in 2020, Kino Lorber released a newly restored version of her award-winning documentary BloodSisters: Leather, Dykes & Sadomasochism (1995) for its 25 year anniversary.

Her work is in the collection of Moscow Museum of Contemporary Art; Kadist Art Foundation SF/Paris; di Rosa Foundation and Preserve, Napa, California; Pacific Film Archives, University of California, Berkeley; and Zabludowicz Art Trust, London.

== Selected works ==
=== Early films (1989-1992) ===
Handelman’s early short films Safer Sexual Techniques in the Age of Mechanical Reproduction (1989), Homophobia is Known to Cause Nightmares (1990), and Catscan (1990) were part of the New Queer Cinema movement, with screenings in the early editions of BFI Flare: London LGBT Film Festival, Frameline Film Festival, OUTFEST, and MIX: New York Experimental Gay & Lesbian Film Festival, where Handelman began personal and professional relationships with AIDS activists Jim Hubbard and writer Sarah Schulman.

She is also known for her artistic collaborations with Industrial Music pioneer Monte Cazazza throughout the 1990s. Their explicit film Catscan (1990) broke into the art world through a series of guerrilla actions and together they built several bodies of visual work including The Torture Series (1992), Blood, Guts and Beauty (1994), and the essay “The Cereal Box Conspiracy Against the Developing Mind,” published in the counterculture anthology, Apocalypse Culture, by Feral House Press in 1990.

Handelman thinks of all of her work as “living” projects, as they change with each showing through new edits, reconfigurations, and different modes of display which she uses to re-contextualize each work within the contemporary time and place.

=== BloodSisters: Leather, Dykes & Sadomasochism (1995) ===
Michelle Handelman is best known for her feature-length documentary on the San Francisco leather dyke scene BloodSisters: Leather, Dykes & Sadomasochism (1995), which premiered at the 1995 Frameline International Gay and Lesbian Film Festival as part of the New Queer Cinema movement. The film then went on to screen at over 50 festivals and venues in London, Berlin, Amsterdam, New York, Los Angeles, Melbourne – over eleven countries in all, with broadcasts on England’s Bravo TV and Channel 4, in addition to German, Italian, and Australian television. In 1999, the film won the Bravo Award and the Grand Prize at the Manchester Film Festival.

In the late 1990s, BloodSisters was at the heart of a censorship controversy when the NEA was up for ratification. This controversial film was attacked in congress by the American Family Association for its depictions of radical lesbian sexuality and labeled as “deviant” by notable American congressmen. At the time, California congresswoman Nancy Pelosi and senator Barbara Boxer stood up for the film, calling it “significant and worthy of support."

In 2020, a newly restored version of BloodSisters was released by Kino Lorber for its 25-year anniversary. This resurgent interest in BloodSisters has shined a spotlight on its continued significance, with international screenings, reviews and interviews with Handelman continuing well into 2023.

=== Hustlers & Empires (2018-2019) ===
In 2018, Handelman was commissioned by the San Francisco Museum of Modern Art to create a new interdisciplinary performance, Hustlers & Empires (2018). Looking at transgression as a mode of survival, the project includes a large-scale exhibition with multichannel video, alongside a live performance. The project draws on the stories of three real and imagined hustlers, inspired by Iceberg Slim's Pimp (1967); Marguerite Duras's The Lover (1984); and Federico Fellini's Toby Dammit (1968), opening up questions of survival and belonging, and how they intersect with issues of race, religion and gender. It features NYC downtown performance legend John Kelly, queer activist Viva Ruiz (Thank God for Abortion) and musician Shannon Funchess (Light Asylum) who each collaborated with Handelman on original songs and monologues. Components of this multi-platform project have shown at the Performa 2021 Biennial, and exhibitions in New York.

=== Irma Vep, The Last Breath (2013-2015) ===
In 2013, Handelman completed Irma Vep, The Last Breath (2013-2015) a multichannel film installation based on the silent film character Irma Vep. It looks at queer erasures and legacies through the resilience of intergenerational relationships, featuring trans artist and activist Zackary Drucker and drag legend Jack Doroshow aka Flawless Sabrina. Its world premiere was at The Eli & Edythe Broad Art Museum (2013), and then in the subsequent years traveled to The Henry Art Gallery, Anthology Film Archives, Lincoln Center, Museum of the Moving Image, Madison Museum of Contemporary Art, BFI: Fashion In Film Festival, Outfits Platinum, among others. Irma Vep, The Last Breath was included in the 100 year anniversary of Les Vampires, and is also included on the Kino Lorber Blu-ray release of the film classic, The Queen (1968), a documentary about the drag balls in New York City.

=== Dorian, A Cinematic Perfume (2009-2012) ===
Handelman's four-channel video installation Dorian, A Cinematic Perfume (2009-2012) is a contemporary queer adaptation of Oscar Wilde's The Picture of Dorian Gray. It features the bio-fem drag queen Sequinette as Dorian, master Theremin player Armen Ra as Lord Henry, performance artist K8 Hardy as Sybl, media artist Quin Charity as Basil and drag legend Mother Flawless Sabrina as Dead Dorian. Each character communicates through music and gestures developed by Handelman in collaboration with the performers. It also features music by Lustmord, Nadia Sirota, Vincent Baker, and Stefan Tcherepnin. Dorian, A Cinematic Perfume has been exhibited at Participant, Inc., NYC; MIT List Visual Arts Center, Cambridge; Arthouse at the Jones Center, Austin; Guangzhou 53 Art Museum, China; Dirty Looks Screening Series, NYC, and Vox Populi gallery, Philadelphia.

=== Beware the Lily Law (2011-2023) ===
Beware the Lily Law (2011-2023) is a public art piece by Michelle Handelman that has been on display at the Eastern State Penitentiary, Philadelphia, PA. since 2011. The piece uses the 1969 Stonewall Riots as a starting point to address issues facing gay and transgender inmates. Handelman's installation gives the viewer the experience of sitting in a cell with a trans inmate, listening to their story. A video projection of an inmate speaks directly to the viewer as if they're speaking to their cellmate, telling stories of how they ended up in prison and when they discovered they were trans. There is a bed for the viewer to sit upon while they listen to their "cellmate's" stories. The title of the piece “Beware the Lily Law” comes from code words bouncers and patrons used to identify undercover police who often infiltrated the bar. Performed by Becca Blackwell and Michael Lynch, Handelman developed these monologues based on the experiences of real men and women, as well as the personal experiences of each performer. Michael Lynch also performs the monologue “Spare Some Change for a Dying Queen”, written by Jimmy Camicia in the mid-80s as an homage to Stonewall activist Marsha P. Johnson.

=== This Delicate Monster (2005-2007) ===
This Delicate Monster is a multimedia pop fable inspired by Charles Baudelaire’s 19th century collection of poems, Les Fleurs du Mal. Handelman creates a haunting and hallucinatory fragmented narrative best described as a cross between a horror film and a fashion shoot gone terribly wrong. Collaborating with couture fetish designer Garo Sparo, Italian noise band Larsen, dark ambient composer Lustmord, and a cast of performers, the multi-screen narrative is constructed of gestures and sounds that breathe life into Baudelaire’s text such as, “No abyss compares with your bed”, and “condemned to an eternal laugh because I know not how to smile”. The entire project consists of multiple video pieces, photographs, and live performance.

=== The Laughing Lounge (2005) ===
Handelman created the live multimedia performance, The Laughing Lounge (2005) for Performa, the first biennial of visual art performance. Inspired by the laughing clubs of India and the dystopian 1982 film Kamikaze 1989, The Laughing Lounge is part horror show, part healing lounge. The performance ran for three days. Audiences gathered in the dimly lit front space of the gallery Jack the Pelican Presents, Brooklyn, where they were invited to sit, drink, and laugh incessantly. If they grew weary, others took their place so that a constantly laughing group was maintained. The laughter was captured by video surveillance and projected live into the gallery’s back space, directly onto the disco ball mirrored dresses of three performers—Tori Sparks, Robert Appleton and Quin Charity—who danced, posed and laughed atop a rotating platform.

=== Cannibal Garden (1999-2000) ===
Cannibal Garden is a series of works from 1998 to 2000 investigating hermaphroditic, self generating/self-satisfying systems within nature. The project uses artifice as costume, mining sci-fi, anime and horror films, the project explores sex, desire and obsession, alongside large-scale digital photographs referencing futuristic plant forms and sex toys. Their Rorschach-like structure opens up a sexualized psychology between form and content; digestion and expulsion, while referencing flowers, insects and frilly sex toys. The performative videos are humorous and grotesque, featuring Handelman playing to the lens while pursuing pleasure and excess as a single-minded activity.

== Writing ==
Handelman's fiction has been published in Coming Up, The World's Best Erotica edited by Michael Perkins (Richard Kasak Books, New York), Herotica 3 edited by Susie Bright (Down There Press, San Francisco), Inappropriate Behaviour edited by Jessica Berens and Kerri Sharpe (Serpent’s Tail, London) and several anthologies. She has written extensively for Filmmaker Magazine, including interviews with director Kirby Dick (Sick: The Life and Death of Bob Flanagan) and Beth B (Lydia Lunch: The War is Never Over). “The Media Conspiracy Against the Developing Mind", was co-written with Monte Cazazza and is published in the anthology Apocalypse Culture (Feral House Press, Los Angeles).

== Filmography ==
Film and video installations	Year	Description	Citation
Safer Sexual Techniques in the Age of Mechanical Reproduction	1988		
Catscan	1989		
Homophobia Is Known To Cause Nightmares	1990	Experimental cut-up techniques	
A History of Pain	1992	"An experimental narrative about the Spanish inquisition and how it still permeates our current psychosexual cultural milieu."	
Hope	1994		
BloodSisters	1995	Documentary about leather dykes in San Francisco in the mid-1990s.	
Ponygal	1998		
Blowjob	1999		
CandyLand	2000	Part of the series "Cannibal Garden", nude artist lies on the floor, consuming crystal "candy" and spitting it out.	
Aliendreamcord	2000		
I.C.U.	2000	Part of the series "Cannibal Garden", explores identity in digital spaces.	
La Suture	2000		
pt.2.pt	2001		
Jump	2002		
I Hate You	2002		
DJ Spooky vs. WebSpinstress M	2002		
Folly & Error	2004-2007		
Waterfall	2004-2007		
This Delicate Monster	2004-2007	Influenced by Charles Baudelaire's 19th century collection of poems "Les Fleurs du Mal." Projections, live performances, and photographs were part of the multimedia presentation.	
StarDustCrashDown	2008		
Dorian, A Cinematic Perfume	2009-2011	Adapting Oscar Wilde's "The Picture of Dorian Gray" into a four-channel video installation with a queer, feminist point of view.	
Irma Vep, The Last Breath	2013-2015	Influenced by Musidora, best known for, Irma Vep from the 1915 film Les Vampires.	
Hustlers & Empires	2018	Protagonists from Iceberg Slim’s Pimp (1967), Marguerite Duras’ The Lover (1984), and Federico Fellini’s Toby Dammit (1968) are reimagined in this three-channel installation	
LOVER HATER CUNTY INTELLECTUAL	2019		
These Unruly and Ungovernable Selves	2020		
Solitude is an Artifact of the Struggle Against Oppression	2020		
Claiming the Liminal Space	2021		

== Awards and honors ==
In 1999 Handelman won the Bravo Award (Bravo television) for BloodSisters. She is a 2011 Guggenheim Fellow and 2010 New York Foundation for the Arts Fellow.

Her other recent accolades include a 2014 Art Matters Grant, a 2018 New York State Council on the Arts grant, and a 2018 San Francisco Museum for Modern Art (SFMOMA) Film and Performance Commission, all for her film project Hustlers & Empires. In 2019, she received a NYSCA/Wave Farm Media Arts Assistance Fund Grant and was a Creative Capital awardee. She was an artist-in-residence at the Robert Rauschenberg Foundation on Captiva Island in 2020.

== See also ==
- List of female film and television directors
- List of LGBT-related films directed by women
