= Forever Evil (film) =

- Theatrical release poster
- Directed by: Roger Evans
- Written by: Freeman Williams
- Produced by: Jill Clark
- Starring: Red Mitchell; Tracey Huffman; Charles L. Trotter
- Cinematography: Horacio Fernandez
- Edited by: Roger Evans; Horacio Fernandez
- Music by: Marianne Pendino; Rod Slane
- Production companies: B. and S. Productions; FrameWork Pictures Ltd.
- Distributed by: United Video
- Release date: 6 October 1987 (United States)
- Running time: 107 minutes
- Country: United States
- Language: English

Forever Evil (also known as Nemesis) is a 1987 American horror film directed by Roger Evans, who also co-edited the film. It stars Red Mitchell, Tracey Huffman, and Charles L. Trotter.

== Plot ==
Three couples, Marc Denning and his girlfriend Holly, Marc's brother Jay and his girlfriend Julie, and Marc and Holly's friends Robert and Jeanne, meet for one last party before vacating a lakeside cabin. As the friends play cards, Holly goes to shower. A scream is heard and Holly is discovered in the shower dead, her entrails ripped open and her baby (she was pregnant) gone. Julie is found hung upside down in the living room, her throat cut, and Jay is killed by an invisible force with glowing red eyes, while Jeanne is dragged out the window by a tree branch, apparently to her death. Robert tries to save Jeanne but is soon killed as well. After being assaulted by a zombie-like creature whose eye he rips out, Denning stumbles to the nearby highway where he is hit by a car.

He wakes up in the hospital with a broken leg and three broken ribs. The police begin to investigate the murders, with Detective Leo Ball in charge, who feels the murders are connected to others. Shortly after the murders, Denning also begins to look for answers that will explain the slaughter.

Meanwhile, a red-caped tarot reader named Brother Ben Magnus reads the cards for an unidentified Southern-accented woman. He tells her she has to leave urgently. As she does so, she is attacked by something. Then a shadowy red-eyed cowled figure appears in the doorway of Magnus's house. He shoots at it, but the bullets bounce off. The cowled figure zaps Magnus with an energy ray.

Denning is investigating at the library when a woman, Reggie Osborne, a survivor of a previous massacre, introduces herself. These two then travel with Leo to the house of Brother Ben Magnus, who had assisted Leo previously. The house is unoccupied, but Ben has left a box of old books for Leo to examine. These include The Necronomicon, a book called Lost Gods, one called The Gate and the Key by C. D. Ward and The Chronicles of Yog-Kothag. Denning becomes convinced that the murders are sacrifices rather than serial killings, especially when he reads a letter left by Ben that says "He's coming back." Denning takes "he" to refer to the old god, Yog-Kothag.

Reggie and Denning join forces over coffee at Denning's house, where a sinister dog who showed up before shows up again. Leo teaches Denning to use a gun, while Denning shows him a magazine article about quasars. He has a theory that the killings coincide with pulsings of certain quasars in certain years. Leo is skeptical.

Reggie and Denning go to a movie called The Jet Benny Show. Later, at a cemetery, Denning witnesses the reappearance of Holly. She rips open her womb and takes out a baby, which falls to the ground. It appears demonic and has glowing red eyes. Denning then wakes up – it was only a dream.

Leo receives a document via mail which he opens and then remails to Denning. As goes to mail the envelope, Leo witnesses a boiling cloud and a ray that zaps his car. Shortly after, he is attacked by something and dies. Denning wakes from a dream, realizing Leo is in trouble and races to the scene. The police are taking Leo's body away.

Denning maintains contact with a professor, Dr. Phillips, via telephone regarding the pulsing of quasars. One is set to pulse on the coming Thursday. Dennings plots the killings on a map, and realizes that the killings form a pentagram, which is the 'evil' symbol of Yog-Kothag as depicted in the Yog-Kothag book. At the center of the pentagram lies the Nash real estate agency, owned by Parker Nash, who was the realtor for both Denning and Reggie. Denning explains that Yog-Kothag was an old god who was "so bad that the other gods ganged up on him and imprisoned him on a quasar."

With the help of Lisa, Denning's doctor and an old friend of Leo's, they try to spring a trap on Nash on the Thursday of the quasar's pulse. At night, while waiting, Denning sees the demonic baby once more, which attacks him, bit it was also a dream. The zombie reappears and attacks Denning and Reggie. They try to kill it multiple times, thrusting a firepoker through it, hitting it with Reggie's pickup truck and finally setting its body on fire, but it comes back to life each time. At a motel, Reggie confesses her love for Denning before the zombie reappears and stabs Denning with a mystical dagger. While Reggie flees, Denning extracts the dagger and stabs the zombie with it.

Reggie goes to confront Nash, witnessing the sinister dog again and soon learns Nash has superhuman powers. He is resistant to bullets and is able to prevent a paperweight that she throws at his head from striking him. Nash shows Reggie the document which Leo mailed to Denning, but which never arrived. It is Nash's birth certificate, showing that he was born over a hundred years ago. The apparent mysterious and supernatural cult dedicated to bringing Yog-Kothag back to Earth is in fact just Nash, and his zombie. Together they committed a series of periodic ritual murders over the last decades. The zombie is now dead, but Nash reveals that Denning has been transformed into a new zombie, who enters Nash's office in his zombified state. Yog-Kothag speaks through Denning with a warning to Nash that he is in danger. Denning then reasserts himself and stabs Nash with the mystical dagger before collapsing, dead. Reggie carries his corpse back to her truck and departs.

The film ends as Nash seems to be drawn screaming into the cosmic void. Yog-Kothag's voice is heard proclaiming "Worm! Thou hast failed me!" The ending text reads, "Somewhere, a man named Nash is screaming."

== Cast ==
- Red Mitchell as Marc
- Tracey Huffman as Reggie
- Charles L. Trotter as Leo
- Howard Jacobsen as Nash
- Kent T. Johnson as Zombie
- Diane Johnson as Holly

== Production ==
Forever Evil was filmed in the Houston and Coldsprings, Texas areas on a budget of approximately $150,000, and financed by United Home Video, a Tulsa-based video distributor that had pioneered producing its own films for direct release to videocassette, bypassing theatrical distribution entirely.

== Release ==
Forever Evil was produced as the fifth made-for-video horror production from United Home Video. It was released directly to the home video market in October 1987. A re-release, in heavily edited form, followed on VHS in May 1990. It was later released for the first time on DVD by VCI Video on November 30, 2004. VCI re-released the film on September 11, 2012, as a part of its "Scream Theater Double Feature" movie pack alongside Children Shouldn't Play With Dead Things (1972).

=== Critical response ===
Forever Evil received a mostly negative response from critics upon its initial release, with many calling it another "Evil Dead rip-off".

Writing in the Houston Chronicle upon the film's initial release, Bruce Westbrook described it as "competently photographed, edited and scored" with acting of "earnest conviction," but criticized Freeman Williams' script as "a rambling, vague affair" and concluded that the story was "too dull to play it this straight."

Author John Stanley gave the film a negative review, stating that the film "only comes to life with the appearance of a zombie-like creature that cannot be killed, and the efforts of hero and heroine to do the monster in." In his book The Complete H.P. Lovecraft Filmography, author Charles P. Mitchell stated that "although marketed as an explicit horror film, it is actually a rather thoughtful picture rather than a gorefest. Unfortunately, it is overlong, and occasionally bogged down with too many irrelevant subplots. The script stresses the mystery elements of the story, making its revelations in piecemeal fashion in an attempt to retain audience interest...Forever Evil may be a letdown, but it is a sincere and worthwhile attempt, given the resources at hand."

The film was not without its supporters. Drew Beard fromHorrorNews.net called it "[an] enjoyably awful mid-80s low-budget horror", stating that, although its varied performances, clichéd story, poor direction, special effects, and pacing greatly hindered the film overall; he felt the film was still enjoyable enough to warrant subsequent viewings. Scott Aaron Stine gave the film a mixed review, criticizing the film's poor make-up/special effects, and overuse of jumpscares instead of actual tension. However, Stine commended the film's script as being "above-average" and "non-formulaic", stating that the film was "interesting enough to keep the viewer from finding something constructive to do."
