= Deathdream =

1974 film directed by Bob Clark

- Deathdream theatrical release poster under its original title Dead of Night
- Directed by: Bob Clark
- Screenplay by: Alan Ormsby
- Produced by: Bob Clark
- Starring: John Marley; Lynn Carlin; Richard Backus; Henderson Forsythe
- Cinematography: Jack McGowan
- Edited by: Ronald Sinclair
- Music by: Carl Zittrer
- Production companies: Dead Walk Company; Quadrant Films; Impact Films
- Distributed by: Entertainment International Pictures (U.S.); Ambassador Film Distributors (Canada)
- Release date: August 29, 1974
- Running time: 88 minutes
- Countries: Canada; United Kingdom
- Language: English
- Budget: $300,000

Deathdream (originally released as Dead of Night) is a 1974 horror film directed and produced by Bob Clark, written by Alan Ormsby, and starring Richard Backus, John Marley, and Lynn Carlin. Inspired by the W. W. Jacobs short story "The Monkey's Paw", the film is about young American soldier Andy Brooks (Backus) who returns home after seemingly being killed in Vietnam, only now as an undead, vampiric creature.

== Plot ==
In 1972 Vietnam, American soldier Andy Brooks is shot by a sniper and falls to the ground. As he dies, he hears his mother Christine's voice calling out, "Andy, you'll come back. You've got to. You promised."

Sometime later, Andy's family receives notice of his death in combat. His father, Charles, and sister, Cathy, begin to grieve, but Christine becomes irate and refuses to believe that Andy has died. Meanwhile, a trucker stops at a diner and says that he has picked up a hitchhiker who is a soldier. Hours later, in the middle of the night, Andy arrives at his family's front door in full uniform, apparently unharmed; the family welcomes him back with joy, concluding the notice of his death was a clerical error. When Charles says the military told them Andy was dead, he replies "I was." The family laughs, thinking this a joke.

In the next few days, Andy displays strange, withdrawn behavior, speaking only rarely, dressing in a concealing manner, and spending his days sitting around the house, listless and anemic. At night, however, he becomes inexplicably animated, wandering the town and spending time in the local cemetery. Meanwhile, local police investigate the murder of the trucker, who was found with his throat slashed and his body drained of blood.

Charles attempts to confront Christine about Andy's erratic behavior. Christine insists that Charles was too withdrawn and authoritarian toward Andy; Charles counters that Christine made Andy too sensitive by smothering him. Andy's behavior escalates: he attacks a neighbor boy who attempts to demonstrate his karate skills, then kills the family dog Butch when it tries to protect the child. Charles witnesses the killing, tells his wife that their son is crazy, and then goes to a bar, where he tells his friend, physician Doc Philip Allman, what Andy did.

Charles brings Doc home, and he offers Andy a free checkup. Doc asks questions related to the trucker, suspecting Andy of being the one who killed him. Doc later tells Charles about the trucker and says he needs to inform the police about the suspicious coincidence of Andy's return. Andy visits Doc at his office in the middle of the night, angrily demanding a checkup, but Doc can't detect a pulse or heartbeat. Andy tells him, "I died for you, Doc. Why shouldn't you return the favor?" He attacks and kills Doc with a syringe, then uses it to inject the doctor's blood into his arm to reinvigorate his decaying body.

The next day, Charles learns of Doc's death and realizes his son is responsible. When Christine tells him that Andy is on a double date with Cathy, his high school sweetheart Joanne, and his best friend Bob, Charles gets his gun and goes looking for them. At a drive-in cinema, Andy begins to decay due to lack of blood. After Cathy and Bob leave the car to get popcorn, Joanne attempts to talk with Andy. When Andy's decay becomes more visible, he attacks and kills Joanne. Cathy and Bob return to find Andy in a frenzy and he attacks the two. Andy strangles Bob and attempts to run over Cathy. An onlooker shoves Cathy to the side and is fatally hit by Andy, who flees in the car.

Andy returns home, where his mother protects him from his father. Charles, stricken with grief, kills himself when he sees the monster his son has become. As Christine is driving Andy away, he is shot twice by police, and their gunfire sets the car on fire. The police pursuit ends at the cemetery, where Andy's decayed corpse is discovered writhing in a shallow grave beneath a tombstone on which he had scrawled his own name and the dates of his birth and death. Christine cries as she tries to cover the corpse with dirt. Andy dies as the police surround a sobbing Christine.

== Cast ==
- John Marley as Charles Brooks
- Lynn Carlin as Christine Brooks
- Richard Backus as Andy Brooks
- Henderson Forsythe as Doc Allman
- Anya Ormsby as Cathy Brooks
- Jane Daly as Joanne
- Michael Mazes as Bob
- Virginia Cortez as Rosalie
- Bud Hoey as Ed

== Production ==
=== Casting ===
Richard Backus was cast as Andy Brooks after the casting director was impressed by his intense, quiet stare. Christopher Walken had also been considered for the part. Gary Swanson was briefly cast in the part, and even appeared in test footage that was later featured in the film's Blu-ray release from Blue Underground.

Bob Clark cast John Marley and Lynn Carlin as Charles and Christine Brooks, based upon their performance as a dysfunctional couple in John Cassavetes' Faces. Unbeknownst to Clark, the two actors did in fact have genuine animosity, which bled onto the set of Deathdream.

=== Filming ===
Though financed by a Toronto-based company, the film was shot in Brooksville, Florida, in the fall of 1972, under the working title The Night Walker. Cinematographer Jack McGowan said that Clark, who hailed from Fort Lauderdale, generally preferred filming in the state, and that they chose to shoot the film in Brooksville because of its nondescript small town America look.

Filming lasted three months, with the shoot presenting certain logistical issues, such as finding locations for cemetery scenes and avoiding Christmas lights during the holidays. Much of the film was shot at 312 South Brooksville Avenue.

=== Effects ===
Tom Savini was the special makeup effects artist for the film, at the same time he was working on the Alan Ormsby-directed Deranged. Savini originally designed a more elaborate "decaying" makeup effect for Andy to be used in the third act, but Clark cut most of it out during editing.

== Release ==
Deathdream debuted on August 29, 1974 in Tampa, Florida. The original title was Dead of Night, but this was changed after the film went into wide release, to avoid confusion with the 1945 British film of the same name. The film was also screened as The Night Andy Came Home.

=== Critical response ===
On review aggregator Rotten Tomatoes, Deathdream holds an approval rating of 79%, based on 14 reviews, and an average rating of 6.8/10.

In a contemporary review, Chuck Middlestat of the Albuquerque Journal deemed the film a "light-weight spooker that starts off pretty slowly but builds into a good nail-biter in the last half-hour," but noted the dialogue as weak, adding that "the actors... do as well as they could with sophomoric lines." Dorothy Smilianich of the St. Petersburg Times felt the film only worked when taken as an allegory of America's involvement in the Vietnam War, stating, "Rarely in films is a message as obvious or stridently political. War turns men into monsters, who, like the archetypal Frankenstein, may turn and destroy their creator." She added that Clark "contributes nothing new to the genre but he well understands the techniques for building terror."

In a retrospective review, Glenn Erickson of DVD Talk wrote, "The reason Deathdream works is its superior dramatic staging. The actors are excellent, especially John Marley and Lynn Carlin, both honored for their roles in John Cassavetes' Faces. Clark stages the domestic scenes with a fine simplicity and what we remember the most is the looks of bewilderment on nicely-framed faces." Paul Corupe of DVD Verdict wrote, "Deathdream, the second collaboration by director Bob Clark and screenwriter Alan Ormsby, is a marked artistic and technical leap forward from the pair's overrated debut feature, Children Shouldn't Play with Dead Things. A modern spin on the classic 'be careful what you wish for' theme, Ormsby's screenplay balances a pointed Vietnam War allegory with pulpier aspects—a 'shock' ending, distinct moments of morbid comic relief and beyond-the-grave retribution ripped from the pages of a 1950s horror comic."

In The Zombie Movie Encyclopedia, academic Peter Dendle wrote, "Though not very lively and ultimately anti-climactic, the movie sustains a calculated mood of off-centered awkwardness from start to finish, and is buttressed by strong acting and plausible dialogue." Glenn Kay wrote in Zombie Movies: The Ultimate Guide that Deathdream is "one of [Clark's] creepiest and most thought-provoking works".

=== Home media ===
Blue Underground DVD released a special edition of Deathdream in 2004. In 2017, Blue Underground released a 2K resolution edition on Blu-ray. Special features include an audio commentary by Bob Clark, an audio commentary by Alan Ormsby, the featurette Tom Savini: The Early Years, the featurette Deathdreaming: Interview with Star Richard Backus, alternate opening titles, extended ending sequence, trailers, and a poster and still gallery.

== Unproduced remake ==
In August 2003, Oliver Hudson and John Stalberg Jr. purchased remake rights to the film and optioned for Eli Roth to direct. In February 2006, Dark Lot Entertainment acquired the rights to Zero Dark Thirty written by The Grudge scribe Stephen Susco with Stalberg Jr. slated to direct. In December, it was reported that the film would serve as a remake of Deathdream. By June 2008, financing fell through, leading to Michael Douglas' Further Films taking over producing duties from Dark Lot. Paul Solet would later take over as director in July 2010, and revised Susco's script, with production gearing up to take place by the end of the year. No further updates on the project have been made.
