= Jane Daly =

Jane Daly may refer to:

- Jacqueline Gadsden (1900–1986), silent film star, also credited as Jane Daly
- Jane Daly (actress) (born 1948), American actress
