= Todd Verow =

American film director (born 1966)

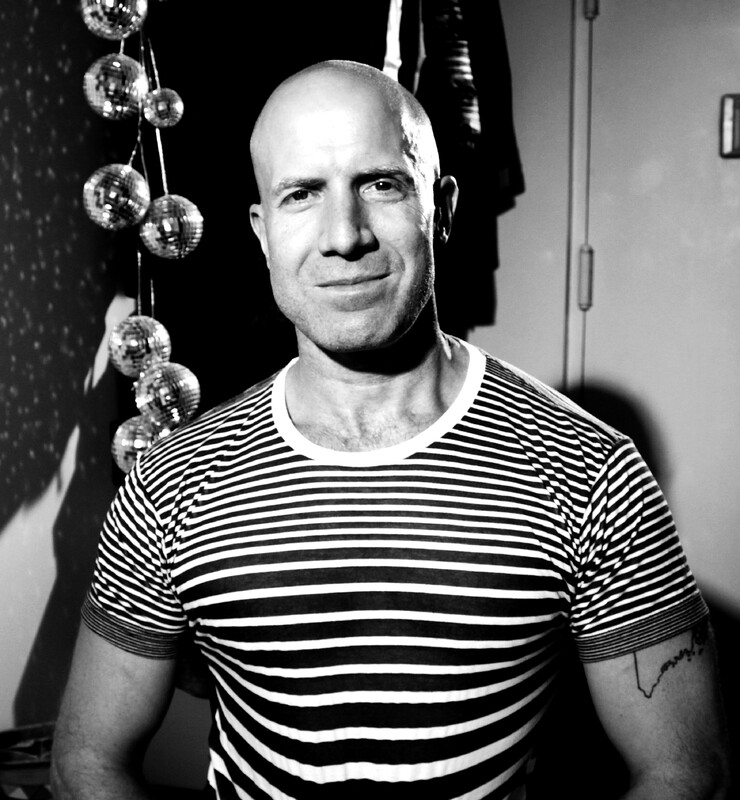
- Born: November 11, 1966 (age 60); Bangor, Maine
- Education: Rhode Island School of Design American Film Institute
- Occupations: Film producer, director, writer, actor, cinematographer, editor, composer, photographer
- Years active: 1985-present
- Father: Arthur Verow

Todd Verow (born November 11, 1966) is an American film director who resides in New York City. He attended the Rhode Island School of Design and the AFI Conservatory. With his creative partner James Derek Dwyer, he formed Bangor Films in 1995. He was also the cinematographer for Jon Moritsugu's film Terminal USA (1993). He has been called a veteran of the New Queer Cinema.

His numerous productions on digital video have led to his being called "once and future king of DV" by Film Threat. He is openly gay.

== Filmography ==
| Genre | Year | Title | Credits | Role | Notes |
|---|---|---|---|---|---|
| Short film | 1989 | V Is for Violet | producer, director, writer, editor, cinematographer | | 15 minutes |
| Short film | 1990 | The Flesh is Willing | producer, director, writer, editor, cinematographer | | 10 minutes |
| Short film | 1990 | The Death of Dottie Love | producer, director, writer, editor, cinematographer | | 7 minutes |
| Short film | 1991 | When I Grow Up I Want To Be a Sex Offender | producer, director, writer, editor, cinematographer | | 27 minutes |
| Short film | 1993 | Built for Endurance | producer, director, writer, editor, cinematographer | | 7 minutes |
| Film | 1994 | Preen | producer, director, editor, cinematographer | | |
| Film | 1995 | Frisk | director; writer; actor | Blond Man in Bathroom | |
| Film | 1997 | Little Shots of Happiness | producer; director; writer; actor | Frances' Husband | Long Island Film Festival Grand Jury Prize winner New England Film & Video Festival Innovation and Resourcefulness Award winner Huntington International Film Festival Creative Artist Award winner |
| Film | 1998 | Shucking the Curve | director; writer; actor | Neighbor | Nodance Film Festival Grand Jury Award winner |
| Film | 1999 | The Trouble with Perpetual Deja-Vu | director; writer | | Chicago Underground Film Festival Silver Jury Award winner Nodance Film Festival Best Director Award winner |
| Film | 2000 | A Sudden Loss of Gravity | director; writer | | |
| Film | 2000 | Once and Future Queen | director; writer | | Chicago Underground Film Festival Silver Jury Award winner |
| Film | 2001 | Against | director | | |
| Film | 2002 | Take Away | director; writer | | |
| Short film | 2002 | Face First | director | | 5 minutes |
| Short film | 2003 | Fluff | director | | 2 minutes |
| Film | 2003 | Ex-Votos | producer, director, writer, editor, cinematographer | | |
| Film | 2004 | Anonymous | director; writer; actor | Todd | |
| Film | 2006 | Bulldog in the White House | director; writer; actor | Bulldog | Chicago Underground Film Festival Gold Jury Award winner |
| Film | 2006 | Hooks to the Left | director; writer | | |
| Film | 2006 | Vacationland | director; writer; actor | Man in Bar (uncredited) | |
| Film | 2007 | XX: Where Your Heart Should Be | producer; director; writer. editor, cinematographer | | |
| Film | 2008 | Between Something & Nothing | director; writer; actor | Hotel John | |
| Film | 2009 | The Boy with the Sun in His Eyes | director; writer | | |
| Film | 2010 | Deleted Scenes | director; writer; actor | John | |
| Film | 2010 | The Final Girl | director; writer | | |
| Film | 2010 | Leave Blank | director; writer; actor | Todd | |
| Documentary | 2011 | Bottom | director | | |
| Film | 2012 | Bad Boy Street | director; writer; actor | Michael | |
| Film | 2012 | The Endless Possibility of Sky | director; writer; actor | Bagger | |
| Short film | 2012 | Jacob Sterling | director | | 7 minutes |
| Short film | 2013 | Fire Island 1979 | director; writer; actor | | 8 minutes |
| Film | 2013 | Tumbledown | director; writer; actor | Jay | |
| Short film | 2013 | Tom's Gift | co-director | | 7 minutes |
| Documentary | 2013 | The End of Cruising | co-director; co-writer | | |
| Documentary | 2014 | Age of Consent | co-director; co-writer | | |
| Short film | 2015 | Been Too Long At the Fair | co-producer; co-director; co-writer; editor | | 7 minutes |
| Film | 2015 | Available Light | producer, director, writer, editor, cinematographer | | |
| Film | 2016 | Required Field | producer, director, writer, editor, cinematographer | | |
| Documentary | 2016 | Sex & the Silver Gays | co-producer, co-director, editor | | |
| Film | 2016 | This Side of Heaven | producer, director, writer, cinematographer, editor | | |
| Short film | 2017 | Secret Santa Sex Party | co-producer, co-director, editor | | 12 minutes |
| Film | 2018 | Squirrels | producer, director, writer, cinematographer, editor | | |
| Film | 2020 | Goodbye Seventies | director, producer, writer | | |
| Short film | 2021 | Swimming to the End of the World | producer, writer, director, actor | | 7 minutes |
| Short film | 2021 | Covid Summer | producer, director, editor | | 3 minutes |
| Film | 2022 | F***ed in the Head | director, writer | | |
| Short film | 2022 | My Almost First Time | co-writer, co-director, editor | | 4 minutes |
| Short film | 2022 | Death Race | co-director, editor | | 6 minutes |
| Documentary | 2023 | Charles Lum: This is Where I Get Off | producer, co-writer, co-director, editor | | |
| Film | 2023 | You Can't Stay Here | director, writer, producer, actor | | |
| Short film | 2023 | Last Year at Belvedere | producer, writer, director, editor | | 4 minutes |
| Short film | 2024 | Desert Cruising | co-writer, co-director, editor | | 4 minutes 20 seconds |
| Film | 2024 | Memorabilia | co-writer, co-director, editor | | |
| Film | 2025 | Behind the Open Door | co-writer, director | | 1 hour 11 minutes |
