= The Emperor's New Clothes (1966 film) =

- Directed by: Bob Clark
- Written by: Bob Clark
- Starring: Joseph Argenio; John Carradine
- Release date: 1966
- Country: United States
- Language: English

The Emperor's New Clothes is a 1966 film directed by Bob Clark and based on the fairy tale of the same name. The film featured John Carradine. The film, shot at the University of Miami, was Clark's first film before She-Man (1967). The film is considered lost.

== Cast ==
Carradine played the Emperor, while the rest of the cast included actor Doug Kaye.

== Survival status ==
Sources indicate the film, described as a short, was "unreleased" although bought by the Hal Roach Studios, and/or lost.

== See also ==
- List of American films of 1966
