= Mod Fuck Explosion =

- Film poster
- Directed by: Jon Moritsugu
- Written by: Jon Moritsugu
- Starring: Amy Davis Desi del Valle Bonnie Steiger
- Release dates: October 7, 1994 (Vancouver, British Columbia, Canada)
- Running time: 76 minutes
- Language: English

Mod Fuck Explosion is a 1994 low-fi independent film, written and directed by Jon Moritsugu. It is about a young girl named London who is trying to find meaning in the world, or a leather jacket of her very own. Unaccepted by the Mods or the Asian biker gang, she tries to find her own path through life. Meanwhile, the Mods and the bikers have a vendetta against each other that is sure to erupt in a smorgasbord of violence. The film was written by Moritsugu and stars his wife Amy Davis as the angst-ridden London.

== Awards and festivals ==
Mod Fuck Explosion won "Best Feature" at the New York Underground Film Festival in 1995, as well as "Best Feature" in the 1996 Honolulu Underground Film Festival and "2nd Place Feature" in the Freakzone Film Festival in France. Mod Fuck Explosion also was accepted to these following festivals: Berlin Film Festival; Cannes Film Festival; Mannheim-Heidelberg Film Festival, Germany; Vancouver Film Festival; Stockholm Film Festival; Singapore International Film Festival; Chicago Underground Film Festival; The Fringe Fest, Australia; Copenhagen Film Festival; Asian American International Film Festival, NYC; Goteberg Film Festival, Sweden; USA Film Festival, Dallas; St. Louis Film Festival; San Francisco Asian American Film Festival; Institute of Contemporary Art, London.

== Credits ==
=== Cast ===
- Amy Davis as London
- Desi del Valle as M16
- Bonnie Steiger as Mother
- Jacques Boyreau as Madball (Mod)
- Victor Fischbarg as X-Ray Spex (Mod) (as Victor of Aquitaine)
- Alyssa Wendt as Cake (Mod)
- Bonnie Dickenson as Cherry (Mod)
- Lane McClain as Shame (Mod)
- Abigail Hamilton as Columbine (Mod)
- Deena Davenport as Babette (Mod)
- Sarah Janene Pullen as Snap (Mod)
- Jonathan Scott Fellman as Satellite (Mod)
- Patrick Bavasi as Tack (Mod)
- Jon Moritsugu as Kazumi (Biker)
- Issa Bowser as Deathray (Biker)
- James Duval as Smack (Biker)
- Christine Wada as Biker girl (Biker)
- Anthony Kwan as Razorblade (Biker)
- Nicholas Lyovin as Sledgehammer (Biker)
- Elisabeth Canning as Cleopatra (Biker)
- Lisa Guay as Nasty (Biker)
- Fred Brandon Chu as Wheelchair (Biker)
- Justin Bond as Amphetamine
- Leigh Crow as Candyman
- Timothy Innes as Nail Clipper Yuppie
- Heiko Arnold Adler as Warhead
- Nancy Allen as Mexico
- Jefferson Davis Parker III as Bar Creep
- Mark Beaver as Cock thief
- Dan Kandel as Sidekick
- Michelle Haunold as Records seller
- Kathleen Blihar as Pale at the record shop / bar stool
- Jude Brown as Pale at the record shop
- Michael Clare as Pale at the record shop
- Andrew Forward as Pale at the record shop
- Clifford Web as Kustom Kar Jock Boy
- Vincent Haverty as Kustom Kar Jock Boy
- Peter Martinez as Kustom Kar Jock Boy
- Lady as Dame at bar
- Christine Shields as Step dancer
- Henry S. Rosenthal as Drummer
- Jon Jost as Drummer
- Antonia Kohl as Bar stool
- Jim Dwyer as Bar stool
- Thet Win as Bar stool
- James Pask as Bus driver

=== Crew ===
- Marcus Hu, executive producer
- Timothy Innes, associate producer
- Jon Moritsugu, producer
- Henry S. Rosenthal, producer
- Andrea Sperling, co-producer
- American Soul Spiders, original music
- Dixieland, original music
- Tengoku Karyo, original music
- Unrest, original music
- Todd Verow, cinematographer
- Jon Moritsugu, film editing
- Todd Verow, production design
- Jennifer M. Gentile, art direction
- Jason Rail, hair stylist
- Jason Rail, makeup artist
- Michelle De Lorimer, sound
- Alenka Pavlin, sound
- Deidre Schletter, sound
- Fred Brandon Chu, gaffer
- Fred Brandon Chu, key grip
- Patrick Taylor, first assistant camera
