= Vacationland (film) =

2006 American drama romance film directed by Todd Verow

- Film poster
- Directed by: Todd Verow
- Written by: Todd Verow; James Derek Dwyer
- Produced by: Todd Verow
- Starring: Brad Hallowell; Gregory J. Lucas; Charles Ard; Hilary Mann
- Cinematography: Todd Verow
- Edited by: Todd Verow
- Music by: James Derek Dwyer; Colin Owens
- Distributed by: Bangor Films
- Release dates: February 16, 2006 (Berlinale); August 2, 2006 (United States)
- Running time: 104 minutes
- Country: United States
- Language: English
- Budget: US$8,000

Vacationland is an independent, gay-themed, coming-of-age romantic drama film directed by Todd Verow and starring Brad Hallowell as Joe and Gregory J. Lucas as Andrew, two high school youth who have a crush on each other, but have difficulties reconciling with their sexuality in a small town. "Vacationland" is one of the official slogans for the state of Maine, where the events of the film take place.

== Synopsis ==
The film, set in Bangor, Maine, is based on some of Verow's experiences growing up in Maine.

Joe is 18-year-old high school senior who lives with his single mother and his older sister Teresa, who works in a convenience store. They live in a notorious estate called the Capehart Projects. Joe has a crush on his friend Andrew, a football player at his high school. Upon the encouragement of Joe's friend Kris and Andrew's friend Mandy, they explore their mutual attraction for each other and fall further in love. Kris and Mandy also sexually experiment together. During one of his early sexual encounters with Andrew, Joe admits to having been gang-raped by three older men after witnessing his older friend Tim being raped by the same men at the warehouse where he works.

Joe is determined to leave town to pursue arts and design studies at the Rhode Island School of Design, especially when his sister leaves for Los Angeles after robbing the convenience store she has been working in for years to pay for her airline ticket. Joe has a fling with his French language teacher in a bathroom and then blackmails him to get good grades and the crucial recommendation he needs as his passport to arts school. Joe also befriends an elderly disabled artist named Victor, who hires him as a model and a house boy. Joe moves in with Victor in his loft above the local opera house. For securing his services and occasional sexual favors, Victor provides Joe with recommendations and help to be accepted to arts school, and decides to commit suicide with an overdose of drugs.

Andrew sinks into trouble, theft and heavy drinking. He tries to reconcile with his own sexuality and what he wants to do with the rest of his life and how can he keep Joe, who is determined to leave Bangor. During their escapades to the nearby Styxx gay venue, Joe happens to recognize his childhood friend Tim, now an openly gay man, but Tim shoves him off.

Joe also recognizes one of his rapists at the club and decides to get even with the help of Andrew. Joe and Andrew knock him out and transport him to the beach. They leave him there with the f-slur in lipstick on his forehead. Tim finds the rapist after Joe and Andrew leave, as he's just starting to wake. Tim sees the word on his forehead and is enraged, kneeling down next to the rapist as the screen fades to black.

In voiceover, Victor reads a letter he wrote to Joe saying that he is leaving him everything. The film ends with Joe and Andrew contemplating their future.

== Cast ==
In alphabetical order:

- Gregg Anderson as Sandi
- Charles Ard as Victor, the old man
- Theodore Bouloukos as Richard
- Michael John Dion as Tim
- Brad Hallowell as Joe
- Nora Hamilton as student
- Mindy Hofman as Kris, Joe's girlfriend
- John Husek as Manager
- Nathan Johnson as Mr. LaBlanc, Joe's French teacher
- Gregory J. Lucas as Andrew
- Jono Mainelli as John
- Jennifer Mallett as Cathy, Joe's mom
- Hilary Mann as Theresa, Joe's sister
- Jennifer Stackpole as Mandy, Andrew's girlfriend
- Justin Stevensen as student
- Todd Verow as Man in bar
- Susan D. Wolfe as Ticket seller

== Production ==
Vacationland's script was written by Todd Verow and Jim Dwyer, and was based in part on Verow's youth growing up in Bangor. Verow also directed, produced, filmed and edited Vacationland. The film was shot digitally, without any film stock, as all of Verow's films since the 1990s. Dwyer composed the music for the film alongside Colin Owens. Charles Ard served as production designer, with Michael John Dion and Jono Mainelli both working as assistant directors.

The film was produced on a budget of US$8,000 and shot in Bangor. Filming took place in August 2005 with a cast of unpaid, non-union performers.

== Release ==
Vacationland was an official selection at the 56th Berlin International Film Festival in the Panorama main program. It premiered on February 16, 2006. Verow received offers for DVD release only, with distribution to be handled through Water Bearer Films. It later screened at the Frameline Film Festival in June 2006.

The film opened in Manhattan on August 2, 2006, playing at the Pioneer Theatre until August 8.

It played October 20–22 at the 2006 Hamburg International Queer Film Festival. It also screened at the 12th Chéries-Chéris in November 2006. In November and December 2006, it played in four German cities: Frankfurt, Munich, Cologne, and Berlin, as part of the Verzaubert International Gay & Lesbian Film Festival.

== Reception ==
=== Box office ===
Vacationland had a worldwide box office revenue of US$7,096.

=== Critical reception ===
Vacationland received largely negative reviews from critics.

Nathan Lee, reviewing for The New York Times, called the film "generic". Lee found Theresa, Joe's sister, to be the most interesting character in the film. V.A. Musetto of the New York Post rated the film one star, noting that the actors playing high schoolers appear too old for the parts. Musetto commented that the film could have been better if it had been a comedic endeavor, but it becomes "dark and violent" and the script "meanders." Leslie Felperin, reviewing for Variety, also mentioned that the actors appear too old for the parts they are playing. Felperin was also unimpressed with Verow's direction, the film's script, and all of the technical aspects of the production.

Ed Gonzalez, writing for Slant Magazine, commented on the brief domestic violence featured in the film as well as the fact that the when Joe is gang raped, he is a child. Gonzalez also noted there is an incident of gay bashing as well as attempted murder. Gonzalez rated it two out of four stars, calling it "drab" while noting that Verow provided no depth to either the characters or the plot. Joshua Land of The Village Voice called it "overstuffed" and noted that many of the secondary plot points of the film suffer from a lack of development, stating it "could have benefited from more extensive script editing." The website CGiii rated it no stars and commented that the acting, script, and direction were all bad.

Darwin Porter and Danforth Prince, writing in Blood Moon's Guide to Gay and Lesbian Film, stated they enjoyed Hallowell's acting, but also noted that he appears too old for the role of a teenager. They also enjoyed Lucas's acting. Overall, like Land, Porter and Prince felt that it was underdeveloped, though they did comment that it had potential.

Christian Horn of Filmstarts did not find the film engaging, calling the plot "contrived" and the acting and aesthetics "lackluster." Horn noted that the visuals are sometimes stringent and sometimes pleasant. Horn felt the ex-girlfriends becoming romantic as Andrew and Joe are also accepting their own sexuality felt contrived, calling the film "too banal" to be considered an art film. He felt that the film does not offer enough to challenge viewers and that Verow's attempt to be both a mainstream and an underground film failed. In a brief review in Der Tagesspiegel, Jan Gympel called the film "ambitious."

Frank Brenner, writing for the website Choices Cologne, called it "raw" and "unpolished", but noted that Verow handling the technical aspects himself gives the film a personal touch. Brenner also called it "an authentic coming-out film" while noting many of the same incidents as Gonzalez. Ulrich Kriest, reviewing for Filmdienst, praised Verow's use of tight camera angles. Kriest noted the numerous parts of the plot that seem to contradict each other, and commented on the carpe diem message that the film ends with as it indicates an acceptance and agreement with negative actions in the film. Kriest questioned how far that extends. Kriest also said the ending "feels almost like whistling in the dark."

Ekkehard Knörer, reviewing for Perlentaucher, found the film interesting because it is not driven to be a commercial success; rather it is the product of Verow's need to share his personal experiences and the hardships he suffered. Knörer acknowledged that all of the technical aspects of the film, including the music, "hover at the upper limit of amateurism," yet he praised the film for its honest qualities and how it is able to convey the reality of being gay in small town America in the 1980s.

Ralph J. Poole, writing a critique of several films in the European Journal of American Studies, found the film's exploration of the trauma of rape "compelling," pointing out that Joe's experience affected his acknowledgement of his orientation but did not leave him "paranoid."

== See also ==
- 2006 in film

== Sources ==
- "Berlin fest lineup". Variety. February 5, 2006. Archived from the original on August 2, 2026.
- "Festivalgäste" (PDF). Hamburg International Queer Film Festival (in German). October 17, 2006. Archived from the original (PDF) on January 4, 2007.
- "Films Made in Maine". Maine / Film Office. n.d.
- "Revivals, Classics, Etc". The New Yorker. August 7, 2006. pp. 22–24.
- "Vacationland" (PDF). Berlinale. 2006. Archived (PDF) from the original on July 2, 2024.
- "Vacationland". Box Office Mojo. n.d.
- "Vacationland". CGiii. n.d.
- "Vacationland". Verzaubert International Gay & Lesbian Film Festival (in German). 2006. Archived from the original on January 4, 2007.
- ""Vacationland," gay comedy/drama". Back Stage. Vol. 46, no. 2. January 13, 2005. p. 32. Gale A127935411.
- Ascher-Walsh, Rebecca (July 12, 2007). "Off the beaten path: gay filmmakers are reaching audiences through a growing number of alternative distribution platforms". The Hollywood Reporter. Vol. 400, no. 21. Gale A167030125.
- Brenner, Frank (n.d.). "Vacationland". Choices Cologne (in German).
- Croyle, Dave (April 26, 2015). "The Determined Storyteller, Gay Essential Talks to Todd Verow". Gay Essential. Archived from the original on May 28, 2015.
- Davis, Leesa (March 9, 2006). "Who got the part?". Back Stage East. Vol. 47, no. 10. p. 28. Gale A143305660.
- Felperin, Leslie (February 23, 2006). "Vacationland". Variety. Archived from the original on April 19, 2016.
- Gonzalez, Ed (July 23, 2006). "Review: Vacationland – Todd Verow's passion and talent, unlike Gregg Araki's, is not equal to his ambition". Slant Magazine. Archived from the original on October 15, 2019.
- Gympel, Jan (June 7, 2007). "Schwulendrama" [Gay Drama]. Der Tagesspiegel (in German). Archived from the original on January 21, 2008.
- Harvey, Dennis (June 19, 2006). "S.F. Gay Fest marks 30 years". Variety. Vol. 403, no. 5. p. 14. Gale A147793251.
- Horn, Christian (n.d.). "Vacationland". Filmstarts (in German). Archived from the original on June 9, 2007.
- Knörer, Ekkehard (June 6, 2007). "Spielarten des Fun" [Varieties of Fun]. Perlentaucher (in German). Archived from the original on June 25, 2013.
- Kriest, Ulrich (February 3, 2008). "Vacationland". Filmdienst (in German).
- Land, Joshua (July 25, 2006). "Vacationland". The Village Voice.
- Lecler, Romain (April 2, 2019) [December 7, 2006]. "Le joli mois des gays" [The beautiful month of gays]. Critikat (in French). Archived from the original on May 7, 2021.
- Lee, Nathan (August 2, 2006). "'Vacationland' Depicts a Gay Man's Path to College, With Lots of Excess". The New York Times. Archived from the original on February 20, 2025.
- Musetto, V.A. (August 2, 2006). "Harsh Maine Men". New York Post. Archived from the original on February 20, 2025.
- Poole, Ralph J. (2018). ""Rise like two angels in the night:" Sexualized Violence against Queers in American Film". European Journal of American Studies. 13 (4). doi:10.4000/ejas.14078.
- Porter, Darwin; Prince, Danforth (2007). Blood Moon's Guide to Gay and Lesbian Film (2nd ed.). Blood Moon Productions, Ltd. ISBN 978-0-9748118-7-1 – via Internet Archive.
- Schafir, Reuben (July 28, 2020) [July 27, 2020]. "Whose idea was it to call Maine 'Vacationland'?". Portland Press Herald.
- Schoeneshoefer, Shelly; Pecota, Karen (n.d.). "People We Met". Kino Critics. Archived from the original on August 4, 2024.
- Willis, John; Monush, Barry (2010). Screen World: The Films of 2006. Vol. 58. New York: Applause Theatre & Cinema Books. ISBN 978-1-55783-729-5. ISSN 1545-9020.
