= BloodSisters (1995 film) =

1995 documentary film

- Film title card
- Directed by: Michelle Handelman
- Screenplay by: Michelle Handelman
- Produced by: Michelle Handelman; Monte Cazazza
- Starring: Skeeter; Pat Califia; Tala Brandeis; Tova Seawall; Donna Shrout; Queen Cougar; JC Collins; Wickie Stamps
- Cinematography: Georgia B. Wright
- Edited by: Michelle Handelman; Gordon Winemko
- Music by: Frightwig; Typhoon; Coil; Fred Giannelli; Chris and Cosey
- Distributed by: Kino Lorber; Women Make Movies; Water Bearer Films; Reframe Collection
- Release date: June 10, 1995
- Running time: 63 minutes
- Country: United States
- Language: English

BloodSisters: Leather, Dykes and Sadomasochism is a 1995 American documentary film directed by Michelle Handelman. The film documents the lesbian BDSM and leather subculture scene in San Francisco in the mid-1990s. BloodSisters is noted as the subject of protests by the American Family Association in the context of their efforts to defund the National Endowment for the Arts, from which the film's distributor Women Make Movies received funding.

== Synopsis ==
The film focuses on a group of self-identified leatherdykes active in San Francisco's BDSM scene in the mid-1990s. The film provides an overview of S&M practices and terminology, and depicts its subjects attending the 1993 March on Washington for Lesbian, Gay and Bi Equal Rights and Liberation, the San Francisco International Ms. Leather pageant, and the New York City Pride March.

== Production ==
Director Michelle Handelman moved to San Francisco in 1986, where she was introduced to the city's lesbian leather subculture by Pat Califia and J.C. Collins, both of whom appear as subjects in the documentary. Handelman was a practitioner of S&M but was unaware of the leather subculture, and sought to create a documentary that was "not only a historical document but also a teaching tool" to both document and raise awareness of the subculture. The film's soundtrack consists of music by Frightwig, Typhoon, Coil, Fred Giannelli, Chris and Cosey, and was initially distributed by Women Make Movies.

== Release ==
The film premiered on June 10, 1995 at the San Francisco International Lesbian & Gay Film Festival, and would go on to be screened at over 50 festivals in 11 countries.

Following its release, BloodSisters became the subject of protests by the American Family Association (AFA) in the context of their efforts to defund the National Endowment for the Arts (NEA), from which Women Make Movies received funding. The AFA produced a reel of lesbian sex scenes from films distributed by Women Make Movies for use in congressional hearings on the NEA in 1997, which included scenes from BloodSisters and the works of Barbara Hammer and Cheryl Dunye. While Women Make Movies received funding through the NEA, the production of BloodSisters did not; further, the scenes the AFA attributed to BloodSisters were from Georgia B. Wright's short film Stellium in Capricorn, which are merely overlaid with interviews featured in BloodSisters. In response, Women Make Movies dropped BloodSisters from distribution; the film was subsequently acquired by Water Bearer Films and later Reframe Collection, a subsidiary of the Tribeca Film Institute.

In 2020, BloodSisters screened at Outfest, NewFest, and BFI Flare: London LGBT Film Festival in commemoration of its 25th anniversary. A restored version of the film is slated for release by Kino Lorber on July 29, 2021.

== Reception ==
In 1998, BloodSisters won the Bravo Award at the Manchester Underground Film Festival.

BloodSisters was positively received by critics. Jane Ursula Harris of BOMB described BloodSisters as a "brave, complex, and unflinching look at a much-maligned subculture." Steve Seid of the Pacific Film Archive Calendar argued that the "often humorous" film "broadens the discussion about private expressions of eroticism, political implications and all." The San Francisco International Film Festival noted that "by following these women and cutting between their personal lives and political activities," the film "draws us deeper into this misunderstood community and gives us a more intelligent and less sensationalist view of the reality behind these women's lives." Jennie Kermode of Eye for Film argues that there is "not enough here for the film itself to serve as a guide to newcomers" to BDSM, but that BloodSisters "really delivers is in capturing a hidden history, and this is something likely to be of interest to viewers regardless of their own sexual preferences."
