= Bob Clark =

American filmmaker (1939–2007)

- Born: Benjamin Robert Clark; August 5, 1939; New Orleans, Louisiana, U.S.
- Died: April 4, 2007 (aged 67); Pacific Palisades, California, U.S.
- Occupations: Film director, film producer, screenwriter
- Years active: 1966–2007
- Notable work: Black Christmas; Murder by Decree; Tribute; Porky's; A Christmas Story
- Children: 2

Benjamin Robert Clark (August 5, 1939 – April 4, 2007) was an American film director and screenwriter. In the 1970s and 1980s, he was responsible for some of the most successful films in Canadian film history such as Black Christmas (1974), Murder by Decree (1979), Tribute (1980), Porky's (1981) and A Christmas Story (1983). He won a trio of Genie Awards (two Best Direction and a lone Best Screenplay) with two additional nominations.

== Early life and education ==
Clark was born in New Orleans in 1939, but grew up in Birmingham, Alabama, and later moved to Fort Lauderdale, Florida. He grew up poor. His father died during his childhood and his mother was a barmaid.

After attending Catawba College majoring in philosophy, Clark won a football scholarship to Hillsdale College in Michigan, where he played quarterback. Eventually he studied theater at the University of Miami, turning down offers to play professional football. He did briefly play semi-pro for the Fort Lauderdale Black Knights.

== Career ==
Clark's career began with She-Man: A Story of Fixation (1967), which was released with the exploitation documentary Queens at Heart. Clark then transitioned into the horror genre in the early 1970s. His first film, Children Shouldn't Play with Dead Things (1972), was a blend of comedy and graphic horror.

Clark and his collaborator for this film, screenwriter and makeup artist Alan Ormsby, would revisit the zombie subgenre in 1972's Deathdream, also known by its alternative title, Dead of Night, a Vietnam War allegory that takes its cue from the classic short story "The Monkey's Paw". The slasher film Black Christmas (1974) was one of his most successful films in this period, and is remembered today as an influential precursor to the modern slasher film genre. Clark had moved to Canada, then a tax haven for Americans, and these Canuxploitation productions were small by Hollywood standards but made Clark a big fish in the small pond of the Canadian film industry of that era.

Clark executive-produced the moonshine movie Moonrunners, which was used as source material for the TV series The Dukes of Hazzard. Clark later produced the 2000 TV movie The Dukes of Hazzard: Hazzard in Hollywood. Clark and others sued Warner Bros. over the studio's 2005 movie The Dukes of Hazzard, winning a $17.5 million settlement just prior to the movie's release.

Turning toward more serious fare, Clark scored a critical success with the Sherlock Holmes film Murder by Decree, starring Christopher Plummer and James Mason, which won five Genie Awards including Best Achievement in Direction and Best Performance for both leads. He followed this with a movie of the Bernard Slade play Tribute, starring Jack Lemmon reprising his Broadway role, for which Lemmon was nominated for an Academy Award and 11 Genies including a win for Lemmon's performance.

Clark returned to his B-movie roots, though, co-writing, producing, and directing Porky's, a longtime personal project. Clark had a detailed outline based on his own youth in Florida, which he dictated into a cassette recorder due to illness, and collaborator Roger Swaybill said of listening to the tapes, "I became convinced that I was sharing in the birth of a major moment in movie history. It was the funniest film story I had ever heard."

Though set in the United States, the film would go on to gross more than any other English-language Canadian film. The film was the third most successful release of 1982 and by the end of the film's lengthy initial release, in 1983, Porky's had secured itself a spot, albeit short-lived, as one of the top-25 highest-grossing films of all time in the US. The film was (also briefly) the most successful comedy in film history.

The overwhelming success of Porky's is credited as launching the genre of the teen sex comedy so prevalent throughout the 1980s, and which continued into the millennium in such films as the American Pie series. Clark wrote, produced, and directed the film's first sequel, Porky's II: The Next Day (1983), which did not feature the title character, and introduced two new antagonists with perhaps greater relevance, a blustering fundamentalist preacher, and a sleazy local politician who cynically caters to his influence, while seducing a teenage girl.

Clark refused involvement with a third film, Porky's Revenge!.

He instead collaborated with Jean Shepherd on A Christmas Story, which critic Leonard Maltin described as "one of those rare movies you can say is perfect in every way". Although not a box-office smash in its theatrical release, A Christmas Story would go on to become a perennial holiday favorite via repeated TV airings and home video. A joint effort at a sequel in 1994, My Summer Story, did not fare as well; Maltin said that the studio waited too long, and Clark was forced to recast almost the entire film. Three other film versions of the Parker family had been produced for television by PBS with Shepherd's involvement during the late 1980s, also with a different cast, but without Clark's participation.

Clark continued to stay active in the film industry until his death, with lower-budget fare mixed in with brief runs at higher targets. A The Hollywood Reporter critic, speaking after his death, described his career as "a very unusual mix of films", because he "at times was a director-for-hire and would do films that, to say the least, aren't stellar". Some of his last output included Baby Geniuses and Superbabies: Baby Geniuses 2.

Clark was nominated twice for the Razzie Awards as "Worst Director", for Rhinestone and Superbabies: Baby Geniuses 2. At the end of his life, he was working with Howard Stern on a remake of Porky's, and, with Black Christmas having been remade, two of his other early horror films were slated for expensive remakes: Children Shouldn't Play with Dead Things and Deathdream.

== Personal life ==
Clark was divorced, and had two sons.

== Death ==
Clark and his younger son, Ariel Hanrath-Clark, 22, were killed in a head-on car crash on the Pacific Coast Highway in Pacific Palisades, Los Angeles on the morning of April 4, 2007.

== Filmography ==
=== Film ===
| Year | Title | Director | Writer | Producer | Notes |
|---|---|---|---|---|---|
| 1966 | The Emperor's New Clothes | Yes | Yes | No | Short film |
| 1967 | She-Man | Yes | Yes | No | Co-written with Jeff Gillen |
| 1972 | Children Shouldn't Play with Dead Things | Yes | Yes | Yes | Co-written with Alan Ormsby |
| 1974 | Deathdream | Yes | No | Yes | |
| 1974 | Black Christmas | Yes | No | Yes | Also portrayed Billy in scenes where the character is shown on-screen |
| 1976 | Breaking Point | Yes | No | Yes | |
| 1979 | Murder by Decree | Yes | No | Yes | |
| 1980 | Tribute | Yes | No | No | |
| 1981 | Porky's | Yes | Yes | Yes | |
| 1983 | Porky's II: The Next Day | Yes | Yes | Yes | Co-written with Roger Swaybill and Alan Ormsby |
| 1983 | A Christmas Story | Yes | Yes | Yes | Co-written with Jean Shepherd and Leigh Brown |
| 1984 | Rhinestone | Yes | No | No | |
| 1985 | Turk 182 | Yes | No | No | |
| 1987 | From the Hip | Yes | Yes | Yes | Co-written with David E. Kelley |
| 1990 | Loose Cannons | Yes | Yes | No | Co-written with Richard Christian Matheson and Richard Matheson |
| 1994 | My Summer Story | Yes | Yes | No | Co-written with Jean Shepherd and Leigh Brown |
| 1999 | Baby Geniuses | Yes | Yes | No | Co-written with Greg Michael |
| 1999 | I'll Remember April | Yes | No | No | |
| 2002 | Now & Forever | Yes | No | No | |
| 2004 | Superbabies: Baby Geniuses 2 | Yes | No | No | |
| 2008 | Blonde and Blonder | Uncredited | No | No | Uncredited co-director with Dean Hamilton (Note: Bob Clark in fact directed the film Blonde and Blonder, including additional re-shoots in Los Angeles. Due to the fact that his Canadian citizenship had lapsed he was unable to receive director's credit. He was still fighting to get the credit when he was killed in a car accident.) |

Executive producer

| Year | Title | Notes |
|---|---|---|
| 1974 | Deranged | Uncredited |
| 1975 | Moonrunners | |
| 1991 | Popcorn | Uncredited |
| 2006 | Black Christmas | Remake of his 1974 film of the same title |

=== Television ===
| Year(s) | Title | Director | Writer | Notes |
|---|---|---|---|---|
| 1979, 2000 | The Dukes of Hazzard | No | Yes | Episodes: ''Repo Men'', ''Hazzard in Hollywood'' |
| 1985 | Amazing Stories | Yes | No | Episode: ''Remote Control Man'' |
| 1993 | The American Clock | Yes | No | Television film |
| 1995 | Fudge | Yes | Yes | Pilot film: ''Fudge-a-mania'' |
| 1995 | Derby | Yes | No | Television films |
| 1996 | Stolen Memories: Secrets from the Rose Garden | Yes | No | Television films |
| 1998 | The Ransom of Red Chief | Yes | No | Television films |
| 2000 | Catch a Falling Star | Yes | No | Television films |
| 2003 | Maniac Magee | Yes | No | Television films |
| 2004 | The Karate Dog | Yes | No | Television films |
