= Terminal USA =

- Directed by: Jon Moritsugu
- Written by: Jon Moritsugu
- Produced by: Andrea Sperling
- Starring: Ken Narasaki; Sharon Omi; Amy Davis; Jenny Woo; Victor of Aquitaine
- Cinematography: Todd Verow
- Edited by: Gary Weimberg
- Music by: Brian Burman; Michelle Handelman; Sugarshock
- Release dates: February 2, 1994 (Rotterdam); November 23, 1994 (PBS)
- Running time: 60 minutes
- Country: United States
- Language: English
- Budget: $360,000

Terminal USA is a 1994 American satirical black comedy film, written and directed by Jon Moritsugu that explores themes of family, drugs, violence, and Asian American stereotypes. It is now considered a cult film. Its run time is 60 minutes and it is estimated to have had a budget of $360,000.

== Plot ==
Katsumi walks by two skinheads in their car and they beat him up, calling him racial slurs and demanding him give them their money back for faulty drugs.

On his way out the door, Katsumi is stopped by his mother, telling him the exciting news that he got his acceptance letter to the local community college, but Katsumi tells her he doesn't care. Ma tells Katsumi he should be more like his other siblings: Holly, the popular cheerleader, and Marvin, the studious nerd. In the middle of their conversation, Holly gets a phone call from Muffy that she has written a letter to the principal to get their rival Sally kicked off the cheerleading squad, and signed Holly's name on it.

A wealthy lawyer named Tom Sawyer shows up to announce that he has proof that the family's bed-ridden Grandpa was exposed to deadly chemicals by his former employer, but that they need Grandpa to be dead before they can cash out on their claim. Ma promises Grandpa that she would never kill him for money, as she siphons his morphine and administers it to herself. Holly lures Tom Sawyer into the bathroom and "sharpens his pencil". Sally is furious about getting kicked off the cheerleading squad, and she vows to get revenge on Holly by showing Holly's parents her sex tape with Rex. Katsumi meets up with his girlfriend Eightball to sell some drugs, but when they meet with Fagtoast, he shoots Katsumi in the leg. Dad comes home from work complaining about a racist letter from his co-workers. Ma tells Dad about how Katsumi got into community college but Dad criticizes Katsumi and his "freak" girlfriend while praising Marvin. Dad tells Ma he quit his job but is certain the apocalypse is very near and that they need to start preparing, much to Ma's worries about their finances. Eightball and the wounded Katsumi sneak by his parents and hide in Katsumi's room.

Holly tears up her room looking for the sex tape while Sally calls to taunt her again. Tom Sawyer calls Holly and invites her to go to New York with him, to which she quickly acquiesces. Ma orders pizza and reminisces about the old days with Dad, when he wasn't impotent. Meanwhile, Katsumi asks Eightball to go back to Fun Zone to get the money that Fagtoast owes them. Dad comes into Katsumi's room and Eightball leaves, Katsumi starts telling his dad about getting into his dream community college. Dad says he's worried about Katsumi and how there is more to life than fun and how Holly is chaste and Marvin is virtuous, his worry then devolves into scolding. Rex calls Holly to talk about how much fun he had having sex with her last night and she expresses concern over not having gotten her period yet. Sally calls Ma under the pretense that she is throwing a surprise party at Holly's house to show the cheerleading blooper video, and Ma happily agrees.

At Fun Zone, Fagtoast comes across Eightball and coyly asks her why she would return there. She tells him she's there for revenges and robs Fagtoast of his money and drugs with her raygun, but he follows her back to Katsumi's house. Eightball brings back her loot and they start making out, as Fagtoast watches angrily from outside the window. Dad goes into Hollys room and she tells him that Tom Sawyer called her cute, sparking Dad's concern and he asks her what Tom did to her and she tells him about their encounter in the bathroom. Distressed, Dad assures Holly that he isn't mad at her but that she needs to think about her purity. The pizza boy drops off the pizza to Ma and he tells her he's seen her step out of the shower, as his room looks into her bathroom. Ma flirtatiously says the pizza boy needs to pay her, getting a free pizza and additional cheese bread. Ma tells Grandpa, who witnessed the pizza encounter, that she has unmet sexual needs that aren't being met by her husband.

Marvin calls a phone sex operator and selects "well muscled skinheads" (under the category of gay subcultural studs). Marvin then goes to Katsumi's room, asking for the vacuum cleaner. Katsumi shows Marvin his bloody leg and both Marvin and Eightball urge him to go to the hospital, to which he refuses. Marvin confides in Katsumi that he is stressed by the pressure from Ma and Katsumi offers him cocaine for his woes. Dad asks for a sign that he should kill Grandpa tonight, to which a window shatters. Holly expresses regret for sleeping with Rex, calling him a creep and takes a pregnancy test. Dad walks in on Marvin looking at a gay porno magazine and furiously riding a coin operated horse. Dad freaks out and chastises him, telling Ma and calling him "the pervert in the backroom". Katsumi vomits a large amount of blood as Fagtoast confronts them for robbing him. As Fagtoast gets ready for revenge, one of the two skinheads from earlier calls for Katsumi. Fagtoast taunts the skinhead and hangs up on him, further angering him and they head over to Katsumi's house. Upstairs, Fagtoast threatens to shoot Katsumi and Eightball, but Katsumi dies of blood loss before he pulls the trigger. Marvin does the cocaine Katsumi gave him and starts destroying his bedroom, infuriated by his father's words. Meanwhile, Rex is cycling furiously to Holly's house with a bouquet of roses.

Sally and the other cheerleaders arrive to watch the special videotape, which is actually a secret sex tape that Holly and Rex recorded. Holly comes downstairs just as it is starting, and Ma is disturbed by the video. Suddenly, the pair of skinheads light a burning cross in the front yard and barge into the house looking for Katsumi, demanding their money back. Marvin, high on coke, is excited to see a skinhead and tries to touch him but the skinhead punches him in the face. Just as Dad is about to murder Grandpa, he hears the commotion in the living room, runs in, and shoots one of the skinheads. Eightball stabs Fagtoast in the eye, and then messages her mother ship that her research mission is now complete and she will bring her specimen with her. Then she and Katsumi's body are teleported away.

Tom Sawyer's car pulls up outside, and Holly runs out to meet him, knocking into Rex who came to profess his love for her. She decides to get in the car with Tom Sawyer instead, and they drive away to New York where he plans to traffic her and produce child sexual abuse material.

== Cast ==
- Sharon Omi as Ma
- Ken Narasaki as Dad
- Kenny Lang as Grandpa
- Jenny Woo as Holly
- Jon Moritsugu as Marvin/Katsumi
- Amy Davis as Eightball
- Victor of Aquitaine as Tom Sawyer the Lawyer
- Timothy Innes as Fagtoast
- Peter Friedrich as Rex
- Bonnie Dickenson as Sally
- Jacques Boyreau as Tabitha the Skinhead
- Gregg Turkington as Six
- Elizabeth Canning as Muffy
- Joshua Pollock as Pizzaboy
- Lady as Hot Lust Operator
- Issa Bowser as Buffy (Head Cheerleader)
- Kathleen Blihar as Cheerleader
- Tami Lipsey as Cheerleader

== Beginnings and controversy ==
Terminal USA started out as an entry for a script competition for Independent Television Service, a service that funds independent, innovative and diverse films (distributed by PBS). Terminal USA was featured in a seven-part series PBS aired titled "TV Families", which included other transgressive films such as "Dottie Gets Spanked" (Todd Haynes) and "Family Remains" (Tamara Jenkins). The film was made with a budget of $360,000 and caused an uproar upon airing. "I was pushing the envelope trying to get crazy shit on TV," Moritsugu said in an interview. "For a while we thought we were going to get a lawsuit. The producer said, 'Let's work it. This is our publicity." After filming was complete, Moritsugu described the process as "the most disgusting, worst way to make a movie, with that much money and that many people around."

When people were questioning the National Endowment for the Arts for funding projects considered controversial, Terminal USA was one of the films used as an example for one of the controversial projects funded. The film's controversy continued when it aired on PBS in 1994, and only 150 of the 210 PBS stations agreed to air it.

== Release and reception ==
The film premiered at Rotterdam Film Festival on February 2, 1994, and played at numerous other film festivals, winning awards at Rotterdam and the Toronto International Film Festival. A censored version premiered on television on November 23, 1994, which blurred some gory images and bleeped out some words: even words that were completely appropriate for television, because Moritsugu wanted to make a statement about censorship. A completely uncensored 57 minute version of the film was first screened in 1995 at the San Francisco Cinematheque. Terminal USA was almost put on Japan/US flights for Northwest Airlines, but they decided against it at the last minute. It was released on DVD in 2009.

When the film debuted, David Rooney of Variety wrote, "this rambunctious volley of flagrantly tasteless humor could whip up a minor cult following, especially in the U.K. and Europe" and added that "frivolous sex and gore content is far from explicit, and hard to take offense at." Entertainment Weekly's Ken Tucker described the film as "intentionally ugly and crude: it focuses on a squabbling, drug-taking Asian-American clan that gives new meaning to the term dysfunctional". In the Los Angeles Times, Howard Rosenberg wrote that the film is an "amusing, self-bleeping, self-mocking soap opera whose politically incorrect Asian family communicates mostly through ribaldry and spermspeak", and made reference to the public funding controversy by mentioning that "some members of Congress need to rethink their notion of public TV".

In her book Making Asian American Film and Video: History, Institutions, Movements, Jun Okada describes the film as "an acerbic, black satire about a Japanese American family on the verge of post-apocalyptic meltdown", and that "unlike the serious historical documentaries that form the basis for the genre [of Asian American films], Terminal USA delves in abject imagery and parody in order to emphasize the absurdity of 'positive image'." Mike Hale, writing for The New York Times, echoed that thought: compared to the sitcom All-American Girl that debuted shortly after, Terminal USA is a "much more entertaining and in its way much more authentic depiction of Asian-American family life — a view from the inside that made its way onto television and gleefully trashed the notion of Asian-Americans as a 'model minority'."

== Festivals and awards ==
The film played at the following festivals

- Museum of Modern Art
- Toronto International Film Festival
- Rotterdam Film Festival
- Gothenburg Film Festival
- Copenhagen International Film Festival
- Vienna International Film Festival
- Musée d'Art Moderne de la Ville de Paris
- Institute of Contemporary Arts
- Yerba Buena Center for the Arts
- San Francisco Asian American Film Festival
- Seattle Asian American Film Festival
- Berwick Film & Media Arts Festival
