= Sequinette =

Sequinette Jaynesfield
- Education: San Francisco Art Institute (MFA)
- Occupations: Drag performer; filmmaker
- Awards: Miss Lez 2008; Miss Drag Coney Island 2012
- Musical career
- Instrument: Vocals
- Website: https://www.sequinette.com/

Sequinette Jaynesfield, often referred to simply as Sequinette, is an American female-to-female drag performer and avant-garde filmmaker in Brooklyn, New York. She also works as a make-up artist and stylist for herself and other performers. She is the founder of the Coney Island Sweetheart Pet Pageant, an alternative beauty pageant for pets that raises funds for various animal welfare charities.

== Career ==
In 2009, Sequinette starred in Michelle Handelman's 2011 video installation, Dorian, a cinematic perfume, alongside Armen Ra, playing the titular character.

In 2011, Sequinette starred in Unleashed by Garo, a reality television series with Garo Sparo on Sundance Channel, in which she portrayed herself

Sequinette later expanded into analog filmmaking working with 16mm and super 8 film, processing film herself in many cases, and hand-painting directly onto the negative. She has created several short films, including Queen Down (co-directed with NYC artist Heather Acs), Rack Focus, Cello Screen Test, Lifestyles of the Bitchin' Famous, Good Queen, and Broken: Battle of the Goddesses. Her films have screened in New York, San Francisco, and Austin.

In 2020, Squinette earned a Master of Fine Arts from the San Francisco Art Institute. Later that year, her film Good Queen was selected to feature in a video art projection in Times Square as part of San Francisco Art Institute's 150th anniversary celebration.

== Awards and nominations ==
In 2008, Sequinette competed in and won the eighth annual Miss Lez Pageant at the Zipper Factory in Manhattan. In 2012, she was crowned Miss Drag Coney Island.
