= Alan Ormsby =

American film director

- Born: December 14, 1943 (age 82); United States
- Occupations: Film director; screenwriter; actor; make-up artist
- Spouse: Hilary Thompson (m. 1988)
- Children: 1

Alan Ormsby (born December 14, 1943) is an American director, screenwriter, make up artist, actor and author.

== Career ==
Ormsby began work in feature films with the Bob Clark-directed Children Shouldn't Play with Dead Things (1972), co-writing the script with Clark, providing the make-up effects and starring as the lead, Alan, alongside his then-wife Anya Ormsby. Two years later, Ormsby and Clark re-teamed on Deathdream, directed by Clark and penned by Ormsby. Deranged (1974), a horror film inspired by serial killer Ed Gein, saw Clark producing with Ormsby writing and co-directing the feature (with Jeff Gillen).

In the 1980s, Ormsby continued working as a screenwriter, penning the screenplays for The Little Dragons (1980), My Bodyguard (1980), Paul Schrader's Cat People (1982) and Clark's Porky's II: The Next Day (1983). Ormsby returned to directing with Popcorn (1991), which he'd also written, but left the production early on and was replaced by Porky's actor Mark Herrier. Ormsby's work includes the three "films-within-a-film" in the finished movie. In the early 1990s, he was initially recruited to write the screenplay for a remake of The Mummy for Joe Dante, although it was later re-written by John Sayles. In 1996, he co-wrote The Substitute. He continued writing mostly for television, his last two credits being for The District in 2002.

== Other works ==
In addition to his work in film, Ormsby is known for having authored the 1970s special make-up effects book Movie Monsters, as well as creating the doll Hugo: Man of a Thousand Faces, the latter of which was featured in The Pee-wee Herman Show and on Uncle Floyd's variety show.
