= Jon Moritsugu =

American cult-underground filmmaker (born 1965)

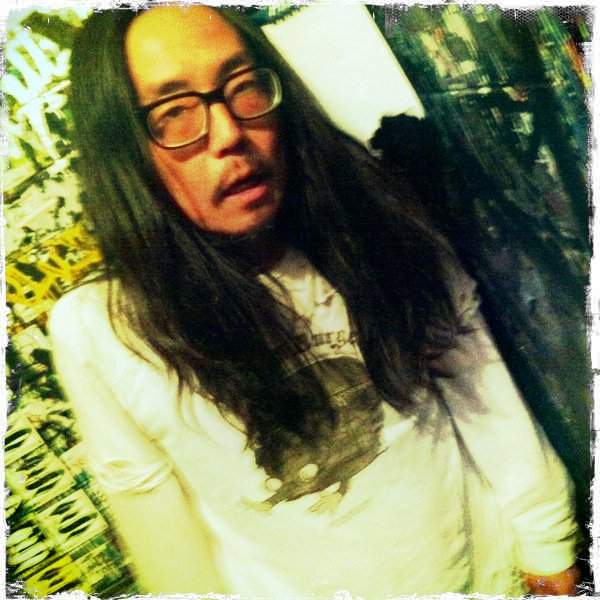
- Born: February 15, 1965 (age 61); Honolulu, Hawaii, U.S.
- Education: Brown University
- Occupations: Filmmaker, musician
- Notable work: Mod Fuck Explosion (1994)
- Spouse: Amy Davis

Jon Moritsugu (born February 15, 1965) is an American cult-underground filmmaker and musician. His movies are satiric, protopunk deconstructions of popular genres and formats with scabrous and pointedly garish results. The New York Times describes them as "funny, anarchic, provocative and exhilarating". Influenced by the nihilism of Jean-Luc Godard and Guy Debord, Moritsugu's films are often defined by their "lo-fi" aesthetic and were initially shot on 16mm film for a gritty, visceral quality. He states that he often "pay(s) less attention to narrative flow and storyline and put(s) more emphasis on sight, sound and spectacle" to create a movie that is "like a live punk/hardcore show." The works themselves are often absurdist comedies that feature actress, co-writer, stylist, and wife, Amy Davis. Perhaps best known for his cult film Mod Fuck Explosion, Moritsugu's films have been screened at Sundance, Cannes, Berlin, Toronto, Rotterdam, Venice, USA Film Festival, New York Underground, Chicago Underground, MoMA, Guggenheim, Whitney and numerous other festivals and museums. In 2001 he received the Moving Image award from Creative Capital.

== Early career ==
Moritsugu started filmmaking in high school in the early 1980s and then attended Brown University, where he studied semiotics and critical theory. Classmates in his department included director Todd Haynes, producer Christine Vachon and studio head-producer Nina Jacobson. Moritsugu's senior thesis film, Der Elvis, was called by The Village Voice critic J. Hoberman "one of the top 50 films of the eighties." The New York Times described it as "a 23-minute jolt of highly controlled chaos." Upon graduating in 1987, he commenced production on his first feature, My Degeneration, but an industrial accident in which his right arm was pulled into a conveyor belt and nearly severed postponed the project. After a lengthy hospital stay and rehabilitation, he was able to restart the movie, which he looked at as a form of "physical therapy". My Degeneration, about an all-girl rock band playing music for the beef industry, starred his future wife Amy Davis. It played at a number of film festivals including Sundance, where Roger Ebert walked out after 7 minutes. Rolling Stone named it one of the "25 Greatest Punk Rock Movies of All Time" and said: "Underground filmmaker/art terrorist Jon Moritsugu reimagines a rise-and-fall showbiz narrative as a scuzzy, 16mm skullfuck opus set in a lo-fi punk world...This movie feels like punk rock: dirty, angry, righteous, handmade, exhilirating." The movie was self-released theatrically, after which Moritsugu moved to the West Coast in 1990.

== West Coast years ==
Settling in San Francisco, Moritsugu completed Hippy Porn in 1991, a 16 mm black-and-white feature which shot for 10 days. Redolent of early Jim Jarmusch, it follows several terminally bored students at a pretentious art school, perfectly nailing the pervasive jadedness of wannabe artists. Top indie label Matador Records was to release the movie's soundtrack, but after numerous and lengthy delays, Moritsugu terminated the deal. Stated label head Gerard Cosloy, "Jon Moritsugu set the Hippy Porn contract on fire and tore the CD negatives apart with his teeth (we didn't have the guts to tell him the test pressings arrived that day)." Hippy Porn was released theatrically in America and gained noticeable notoriety. Picked up for European distribution, the movie was a hit in the Netherlands, Switzerland and France, playing non-stop in Paris for over one year at the Action Christine Cinema.

Moritsugu immediately started pre-production in 1992 for Mod Fuck Explosion, which starred Amy Davis. This low-budget riff on the teen film loosely revolved around a lonely girl's search for a leather jacket while a turf war between mods and bikers looms. The movie, produced by Henry S. Rosenthal and co-produced by Andrea Sperling, was shot by Todd Verow in 16mm. It featured a dream sequence set in a garden of meat, which was filmed in Rosenthal's garage with 800 pounds of raw, rotting beef. After wrapping, and in the middle of post-production in 1993, Moritsugu received word that he had received a grant from ITVS to create a PBS television show. He says: "I completed (the script) in 42 hours... and it got the green light. So right after shooting Mod Fuck Explosion, I got $360,000 to shoot Terminal USA.

Terminal USA, filmed in Panavision 16mm, was a vicious sitcom parody laying to waste the studious image of the "model minority". The director himself played twins – a drug-dealing son and a repressed and closeted math nerd – in a radically dysfunctional Asian American family. The movie was an extreme challenge for Moritsugu, who again worked with producer Andrea Sperling and director of photography Todd Verow. In addition to complications with insurance, payroll, salaries and a large unionized cast and crew, the production itself was fraught with problems including a major outbreak of scabies on the set. Executive produced by James Schamus (former CEO of Focus Features), Moritsugu stated: "I sort of blew it. I was young, full of myself, no one could help me. I basically spit in his face". When Terminal USA was completed, it caused a firestorm of controversy with the conservative right because it had been funded with taxpayer money. It screened at the Toronto and Rotterdam Film Festivals and was broadcast on television in over 200 cities across America.

After a European promotional tour and American appearances to support Terminal USA, Moritsugu resumed post-production work on Mod Fuck Explosion. "A defiantly rough-hewn return to barely-aboveground roots despite some overlaps with Terminal USA," it was completed in 1994 and won "Best Feature" Award at the New York Underground Film Festival. It played the film fest circuit and received tremendous attention, with Moritsugu saying, "Mod Fuck blew-up in Germany, Scandinavia, and the Benelux countries—they really responded to the angst, death, and Amy as a hot blonde walking on raw meat." In America, the movie opened in a number of cities including a 13-week engagement in Los Angeles at the Laemmle Sunset 5 and sold-out runs in Seattle and Baltimore. Giant Robot said about the movie: "Jon Moritsugu hit some weird epiphany during the making of this film, which was his first mass-watchable work. Jon's wife Amy Davis plays a performance art girl who's caught in a rumble between a small group of mods and a Japanese motorcycle gang. [...] The performances are weird, intentionally screwed up, and dumb, but that's part of the film's brilliance. If you're a fan of strange flicks, you'll start remembering the lines and using them. [...] Awesome soundtrack by Unrest and Karyo Tengoku". The movie was picked by the readers of Wired as one of the "Wildest Exploitation Movies," sharing the honor with Eraserhead, The Texas Chain Saw Massacre, Night of the Living Dead and Faster, Pussycat! Kill! Kill!.

Moritsugu's next feature was 1997's Fame Whore, which reprised sitcom mockery and absurdism in service of three parallel stories critiquing fame and featuring Amy Davis as a stoner, trust-fund brat. Produced again by Andrea Sperling, the 16mm movie was a recipient of a Rockefeller Foundation Award. It received "Best Feature" and "Festival Choice" honors at the New York Underground Film Festival and the Los Angeles Times said of it, "Fame Whore is crude, edgy and energetic, and its stars throw themselves into their roles with welcome gusto." The movie opened theatrically throughout the US and Europe, screening at Lincoln Center in NYC and running for 5 weeks in Los Angeles. Fame Whore was considered for an Academy Award in 1999, but it was rejected on a technicality because it had opened in Los Angeles in 16 mm, and at the time, all Academy Award considerations had to be shown in 35 mm.

In late 1999 Moritsugu started work on his next feature, Scumrock, produced once again by Andrea Sperling. He stated: "The original plan was for Scumrock to be a $2 million, 35mm picture. I thought it was totally do-able, what with the success of Fame Whore. This budget proved to be elusive so we cut it down to $50,000. And alas, we ended up shooting Scumrock for $5,000 using a $150 camcorder." Starring Amy Davis (who also was co-writer and director of photography), James Duval ("Frank the Bunny" from Donnie Darko), and Kyp Malone (who would later join the band TV on the Radio), the movie was a deadpan comedy capturing the lives of fringe-art rebels dealing with the perils of turning 30 with little to show for their avant-gardness. After receiving a post-production grant from Creative Capital, the movie's footage was decimated and completely degenerated, Moritsugu's intent being to drag it into the gutter and destroy any sheen or aura of a "pristine digital look". Scumrock was edited on a VHS cuts-only system and upon completion in 2002, it won the "Best Feature" Award at the Chicago Underground Film Festival, following that up with a "Best Feature" Award at the 2003 New York Underground Film Festival. It was selected by The Village Voice Film Critics Poll as "Best of 2003" and then opened theatrically in the US and Canada in 2004, receiving rave reviews from the Los Angeles Times, LA Weekly and E!.

After Scumrock, Moritsugu took a break from "cinema", focusing on musical and other creative outlets and moving with Davis to Honolulu, Seattle, and finally Santa Fe.

== New Mexico ==
In 2010, Moritsugu began production on his seventh feature, Pig Death Machine. Starring Davis (who was also co-writer) and lensed by Todd Verow in digital video, the movie was shot in the wilds of New Mexico over 12 days with a small crew. In spring 2011 and in the middle of Pig Death Machine post-production, Moritsugu directed with Davis a music video for the song "No Future Shock" by Brooklyn rock band TV on the Radio. As described by writer Rani Molla: "Santa Fe filmmakers Jon Moritsugu and Amy Davis veer (very slightly) from their underground experimental base with a music video released today for popular Brooklyn experimental band TV on the Radio. The video is one in a movie-length series of music videos for the band's new album Nine Types of Light". In 2012, the project received a Grammy Nomination in the "Long Form Music Video" category.

In 2013 Pig Death Machine premiered at the Chicago Underground Film Festival, where Moritsugu and Davis won the "Jack Smith Lifetime Achievement Award." The movie screened at a number of US and international film festivals and also made it onto several "Best Films of 2013" lists including one compiled by critic Jack Sargeant. It then opened theatrically across America and also played with the Moritsugu retrospective of 7 features and 9 shorts in select cities including Los Angeles, New York and San Francisco. Pig Death Machine received glowing reviews from the Wall Street Journal, Los Angeles Times and LA Weekly.

In 2015, Anthology Film Archives of New York City completed a two-year restoration project of Moritsugu's 1987 senior thesis film, Der Elvis. With support from the National Film Preservation Foundation and the Andy Warhol Foundation for the Visual Arts, the movie was digitally scanned, remastered, reprinted in 16mm and described as, "one of the most impressive and precocious student films ever made".

Later that year, Moritsugu wrote and directed his first fashion video lookbook. Created for Mishka NYC's fall 2015 collection, the project was co-written and photographed by Davis and featured the music of Low on High.

Also in 2015, James Schamus, former CEO of Focus Features, stated to the New York Times: "Jon is a true cinema original. I'd rather be spit on by Jon than kissed by 95 percent of the directors out there."

In September 2016, an exhibition of seven Moritsugu features opened at the Ramiken Crucible in NYC. Entitled "Semiotics of Sleaze," the movies were projected simultaneous on the gallery's walls for a one-month run. The Village Voice wrote: "Jon Moritsugu's cinema is aggressive, abrasive, and it doesn't stop. His zero-budget movies have spastic editing, disorienting post-sync sound, and bright neon colors; they're a treat for the senses, and poison for the mind... While watching his films, you may feel tired, weak, or nauseous, but you will have had an experience, and a physical one at that – an effect to which many moving images can't lay claim... The gallery is showing these works simultaneously and blasting them at full volume; you'll feel the noise."

In August 2017, Moritsugu wrapped principal photography for his eighth feature, Numbskull Revolution. Shot in New Mexico, the movie aims to "satirize and deconstruct the high art scene in an eyeball-scorching onslaught of mind-blowing narrative madness and honey-laced pathos"." It stars James Duval as artist "Futurecide" and Amy Davis as twin sisters.

Moritsugu landed a book deal in 2018. His memoir titled "SKULLFUCK: The Brutalist Cinema of Jon Moritsugu" was released in January 2022 and was published by Kaya. He is completing post-production for Numbskull Revolution.

== Music ==
Moritsugu also fronted (1997–1998) a punk band with Andy Matinog and Mike Masatsugu called, No-No Boy, after the novel by John Okada.

Since 2011, he is in a lo-fi indie garage rock band with Amy Davis called, Low on High.

== Filmography ==
- Mommy Mommy Where's My Brain (1986, short)
- Lil' Debbie Snackwhore of New York City (1987, short)
- Der Elvis (1987, short)
- Braindead (1987, short)
- Sleazy Rider (1988, short)
- My Degeneration (1989)
- Hippy Porn (1991)
- Terminal USA (1993)
- Mod Fuck Explosion (1994, Best Feature at New York Underground Film Festival)
- Fame Whore (1997, Best Feature and Festival Choice at New York Underground Film Festival; Best Feature at Honolulu Underground Film Festival; Feature Competition Semi-finalist at Austin Film Festival)
- Crack (1999, short)
- Scumrock (2002, Best Feature at New York Underground Film Festival; Best Feature at Chicago Underground Film Festival)
- "No Future Shock" music video for TV on the Radio (2011, Grammy Nomination "Long Form Music Video" category)
- Pig Death Machine (2013, Lifetime Achievement Award at Chicago Underground Film Festival)
- Cycoskuzz (2015, fashion video lookbook for Mishka)
- 30/30 Vision: 3 Decades of Strand Releasing (segment "Martini Shot") (2019, co-directed with Amy Davis)
- Numbskull Revolution (2026)
