= Jane Daly (actress) =

American actress

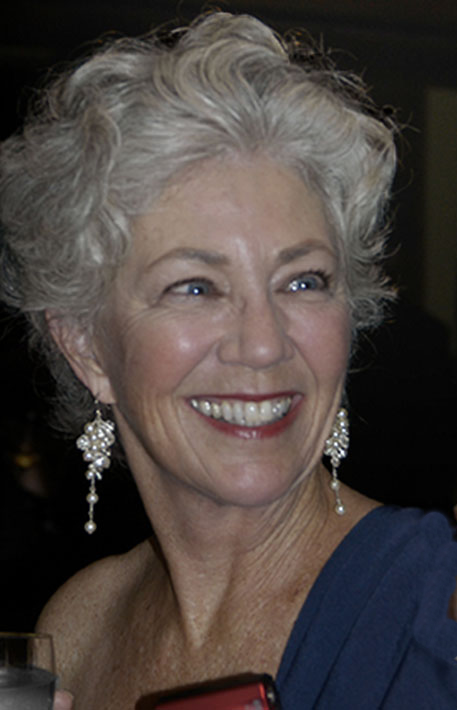
- Born: Philadelphia, Pennsylvania, U.S.
- Education: University of Miami
- Years active: 1972-present
- Spouse: Duncan Gamble
- Children: 2

Jane Daly is an American actress. She is best known for Bob Clark's low-budget zombie movie Children Shouldn't Play with Dead Things and as the original Kelly Harper on the CBS soap opera Capitol.

== Early life ==
Daly was born in Philadelphia, Pennsylvania, the daughter of Edward A. Daly, a World War II Air Force Veteran.

She was raised in Valley Stream, New York and Miami, Florida, where she attended the University of Miami and graduated magna cum laude in theatre.

== Career ==
In 1963, at 15 years of age, Daly was crowned Miss Teenage Miami and a finalist in the Miss Teenage America Pageant in Dallas, Texas where she performed Peter Pan before a nationally televised audience. She and her mother became the face of Ivory Liquid in the mother and daughter look-alike national commercial.

Another of her early film roles was in Bob Clark’s Deathdream with John Marley. Daly starred in the 1987 NBC series Roomies opposite Burt Young. She is notable for her 1994 role in the Cable Ace Nominated And Then There Was One opposite Amy Madigan and Dennis Boutsikaris capturing the tragedy of the AIDS epidemic. She played Julia's mother alongside Tom Cruise on Mission Impossible III.

== Later work ==
Daly has appeared in over 50 television movies and series roles. Her later work includes:

- Patrice Evers on The Rookie (5 episodes, 2019–2022)
- Constance Horning on How to Get Away with Murder (2019)
- Sally on This Is Us (2018)

== Personal life ==
Daly is married to actor Duncan Gamble, whom she met while working on the soap opera Capitol.

== Filmography ==
- Children Shouldn't Play with Dead Things (1972), Terry
- Deathdream (1974), Joanne
- North Dallas Forty (1979), Ruth
- Did You Hear About Josh and Kelly? (1980), Kelly Porter
- The Black Marble (1980), Bullets' Girlfriend
- Amy (1981), Molly Tribble
- Highway to Heaven (1987), Lorraine Douglas
- Star Trek: The Next Generation (1990), Varria
- ...Where's Rodney? (1990), Ann Barnes
- Runaway Father (1991), Lorraine
- Star (1993), Frances Hill
- And Then There Was One (1994), (TV Movie) – Lorrie
- Secrets of the Bermuda Triangle (1996), Ginny Mae Cooper
- Mission: Impossible III (2006), Julia's Mother
- The Keeping Hours (2017), Elizabeth's Mother
