= Flawless Sabrina =

American LGBTQ activist and drag queen

- Photograph by Diane Arbus
- Born: Jack Allen Doroshow; September 10, 1939; Philadelphia, Pennsylvania, U.S.
- Died: November 18, 2017 (aged 78); New York City, U.S.
- Other name: Mother Flawless Sabrina
- Occupations: Activist, actress, drag queen

Flawless Sabrina (born Jack Allen Doroshow; September 10, 1939 – November 18, 2017) was an American LGBTQ activist, drag performer, pageant organizer, and actor. Known as Mother Flawless Sabrina, Doroshow operated a national drag-pageant enterprise from 1959 to 1969, organizing competitions throughout the United States, including the Miss All-America Camp Beauty Contest. Doroshow served as the emcee of the 1967 competition documented in the film The Queen (1968). Doroshow was also as a mentor to queer and gender-nonconforming youth and artists.

== Early life ==
Flawless Sabrina was born Jack Allen Doroshow on September 10, 1939, in South Philadelphia, to Martin Doroshow, an antiques dealer, and his wife, Eleanor Lynch. His father died when Doroshow was a child. Doroshow was of Jewish and Italian ancestry. Inspired by his Aunt Bessie, he first put on a dress in 1947, at the age of eight. "I liked that she dressed gaudy, and I thought it was funny as hell," he later recalled.

Doroshow studied psychology at the University of Pennsylvania in Philadelphia.

== Career ==
=== Drag pageants ===
In the late 1950s, Doroshow traveled to Manhattan from Philadelphia with two friends and stayed at the Sloane House YMCA. Two drag queens from Pittsburgh, who were also staying at the YMCA, invited the three to attend a drag show, an experience that introduced Doroshow to the emerging drag-pageant scene. What particularly impressed Doroshow was that the show attracted a large audience willing to pay for admission, leading him to view drag pageants initially as a business opportunity.

In 1959, Doroshow and his two friends organized a drag pageant in Philadelphia. For the first event, the organizers appeared in suits rather than drag, and Doroshow later recalled that some of the contestants regarded him as an outsider who was profiting from their community. For a second pageant in Pittsburgh, Doroshow drew on his connections from the YMCA and recruited Ty Bennett, a prominent drag performer at New York City's Club 82, to serve as host. After the event's success, Bennett asked for a share of Doroshow's growing business.

Instead, Doroshow decided to host the pageants himself and adopted the persona Flawless Sabrina, later known as Mother Flawless. Doroshow described Sabrina's appearance as "very bar mitzvah mother," with large swoops of blond hair and thick black cat-eye eyeliner. The persona was intended to be nonthreatening to the contestants and to distinguish Sabrina as their "Mother" rather than a competitor.

Throughout the 1960s, Doroshow organized and hosted drag pageants across the United States. His company, The Nationals Academy, eventually employed approximately 100 people, with contests promoted through word of mouth in gay bars and local promoters. Because cross-dressing remained illegal in some cities where the pageants were held, Doroshow was reportedly arrested over 100 times. Doroshow sometimes met with local officials in advance and offered to donate a portion of the proceeds to charity in exchange for permission to hold the events. The organizers also took measures to allow attendees to enter and leave discreetly.

=== The Queen ===
In 1967, Doroshow moved from Philadelphia to New York to make a documentary about that year's Miss All-America Camp Beauty Contest, known to its participants as "Mind-Blow U.S.A," with Doroshow serving as emcee. The resulting film, The Queen (1968), documented the contestants, rehearsals, and preparations for the pageant while also revealing aspects of their lives outside their drag personas. Pop artist and underground filmmaker Andy Warhol helped secure funding for the film through his connections with Hollywood producers.

The film was selected for screening during International Critics' Week at the 1968 Cannes Film Festival, although the festival was curtailed by the civil unrest and strikes in France and no awards were presented. Following its Cannes screening, The Queen received theatrical releases across the United States and internationally in 1968 and 1969, generating considerable media attention.

Writing in The New York Times, Renata Adler observed that the film portrayed people whom mainstream society tended to marginalize and vilify. The film's reception within the drag community was more divided: some participants objected to the exposure, while others resented Doroshow's success in building a business around the pageants while many of the performers continued to conceal their identities and face social discrimination.

The success of The Queen led to numerous invitations for Doroshow to appear on talk shows and other television programs in drag. These appearances attracted attention from both heterosexual and conservative audiences and members of the gay community, some of whom were uncomfortable with Doroshow's public presentation.

=== Later career ===
Doroshow became increasingly disillusioned with the pageant business and organized his final pageant on Fire Island in 1969.

Doroshow served as a consultant on the film Myra Breckinridge (1970), starring Raquel Welch. The producers conducted several screen tests with drag queens and straight actors before hiring Doroshow as a special consultant, which he attributed to his expertise in "homosexuality and whatever." He traveled to Los Angeles for the auditions, which included Rachel Harlow, winner of the Miss All-America Camp Beauty Contest featured in The Queen. Doroshow later recalled that the straight actors were uncomfortable playing drag queens, while the drag queens were "playing themselves" rather than Myra Breckinridge.

In 1970, Doroshow directed The Last Pad, a play by William Inge, at the 13th Street Repertory Theatre in Manhattan's Greenwich Village.

From 1973 to 1975, Doroshow was a contributing editor to the queer magazine Michael's Thing, where he wrote a column titled "FLASH" featuring brief news items on topics such as a new location for a gay church in New York City, police harassment in Chicago, the launch of a gay radio broadcast in Detroit, and the American Psychiatric Association's removal of homosexuality from its classification of mental disorders. Doroshow also wrote film reviews and feature articles.

Doroshow later became involved in LGBTQ activism and advocacy for people living with HIV/AIDS.

After living in Europe for much of the 1980s, Doroshow returned to New York, where he pursued various artistic and cultural projects. Doroshow remained a regular presence at New York nightclubs and maintained a salon-like space on East 73rd Street where he displayed the work of young artists.

In 2008, Doroshow appeared in the New York theatrical production Notorious Beauty. The following year, Doroshow appeared as a drug-induced vision of a thin, ghostly violinist in Dorian, a four-channel video installation by Michelle Handelman. Doroshow was also featured in Handelman's 2014 multichannel video installation Irma Vep, The Last Breath, which was influenced by the character Irma Vep, played by Musidora in the 1915 film Les Vampires.

In 2014, Doroshow participated in the Whitney Biennial alongside artists Zackary Drucker and Rhys Ernst. Their film She Gone Rogue (2012) about the history of transgender women was screened at the Whitney. Doroshow also hosted tarot readings at her East 73rd Street apartment during the exhibition.

== Death ==
Doroshow died on November 18, 2017, at the age of 78, from failure to thrive, a condition characterized by progressive frailty. He was survived by his partner, Curtis Carman, whom he had met in 1985; a half-brother, Godfrey Diamond; and a half-sister, Bambi Marksohn.

== Legacy ==
Doroshow's work organizing drag pageants in the 1960s helped expand the visibility of drag at a time when it remained heavily stigmatized, including within the gay community. A poster of Doroshow from The Queen also appears in the John Waters film Pink Flamingos (1972).

Doroshow also mentored younger generations queer artists and activists, including Ceyenne Doroshow, Matthew Namie, and Zackary Drucker. In 2014, Drucker and Diana Tourjée established the Flawless Sabrina Archive to preserve Doroshow's personal and artistic materials and make them available for study. A Kickstarter campaign raised $21,816 from 362 backers, exceeding its $20,000 goal.

In 2021, PBS television series American Masters released Flawless Sabrina: Queer Icon and Star of "The Queen", a 6-minute documentary short narrated by Peppermint. The film presented Doroshow as an artist, activist, and mentor to queer youth, and situated her career within the history of American drag.

== Filmography ==
Film and video art	Role	Year
Gazelle: The Love Issue	Actor/Herself	2015
Irma Vep, The Last Breath (video installation)	Actress	2014
Saint Bernard	Actor	2013
She Gone Rogue	Actress	2014
At least you know: you exist (short film by Zackary Drucker)	Actress	2011
Dorian (video installation)	Dorian's Dead Self	2009
The Anderson Tapes	Eric, decorator tenant	1971
The Queen	Self/Narrator	1968

== See also ==
- LGBT culture in Philadelphia
- LGBTQ culture in New York City
- List of LGBT actions in the United States prior to the Stonewall riots
