= Amy Davis =

American singer and artist

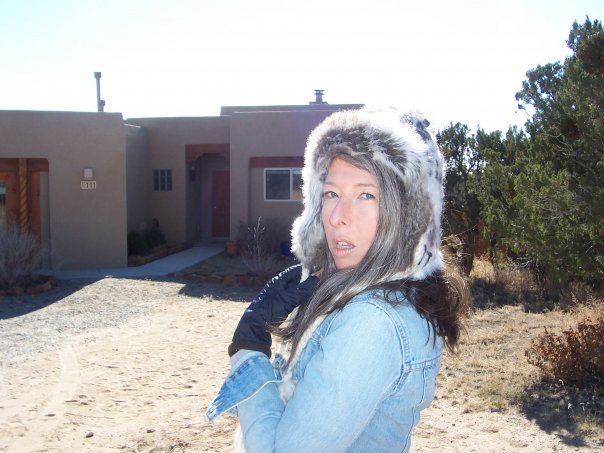
- Davis in 2012
- Born: United States
- Education: Rhode Island School of Design
- Occupations: Fashion illustrator, filmmaker, musician, screenplay writer, film producer
- Spouse: Jon Moritsugu
- Father: Mel Davis

Amy Davis is an American fashion illustrator, filmmaker, and lo-fi musician. Her illustrations have been in shows all over the world, as well as published in magazines and books. She is divorced from filmmaker Jon Moritsugu, and helps run his film production company, Apathy Productions.

== Education ==
Amy Davis studied at Rhode Island School of Design (RISD) and graduated with a BFA degree in illustration. She has been known to describe her experience at RISD as one of torture and anguish, saying that she "tried to drop out but was forced to stay and graduate."

== Films ==
Amy Davis began her acting career in 1990 in Jon Moritsugu's My Degeneration. From there on she acted in all of his films; she was Eightball in Terminal USA (1993).

Davis was the star of 1994's Mod Fuck Explosion as the angst-ridden teen London caught in a violent gang war. 1997's Fame Whore brought her the roll of Sophie. She played the character Roxxy in Scumrock (2002), as well as was the co-writer and cinematographer.

Davis shares the role of screenwriter and film producer with husband Jon Moritsugu. In 2013, they completed their first film in over a decade, Pig Death Machine.

In spring of 2011, Jon Moritsugu and his wife and creative partner Amy Davis directed a music video for the song "No Future Shock" by Brooklyn rock group TV on the Radio. The video is one in a movie-length series of music videos for the band's new album Nine Types of Light. All the videos were also released as part of a one-hour long movie on the same date.

Morisugu and Davis directed the segment "Martini Shot" in the 2019 anthology film 30/30 Vision: 3 Decades of Strand Releasing.

== Paper magazine ==
From 1996 to 2005, Davis worked for Paper magazine, writing and illustrating the monthly column "Style Fiends", which featured characters created by Davis, who were dripping in the latest hard-to-find fashion. She also did a special fashion week project in 2000 called Lab Launchpad Lounge. In this feature, her illustrations featured radical elements such as dangerous looking braces, or a figure wearing a dress that says "Eat the Rich". In 2009 she started a blog for Paper magazine called "Couture Voyeur" and featured Amy's characters sporting the fashion that everyone wants but cannot afford. Her illustrated makeovers were also featured in the magazine, and well as celebrity illustrations. She was also featured in Paper's book 20 years of Style: The world according to Paper, and also From Abfab to Zen: Paper's guide to pop culture published in 1999.

== Music ==
Davis plays bass and vocals for the garage band Low on High, which she started with Jon Moritsugu. They are a lo-fi band with a skuzzy garage punk feel. They self-released their self-titled CD in 2009.
