= The Jet Benny Show =

- Directed by: Roger D. Evans
- Written by: Mark Feltch
- Starring: Steve Norman (as Jet Benny); James Black; Kevin Dees; Steve Garfinkel; James Luedemann; Polly MacIntyre; Richard Sabel; Mark Walz
- Music by: Marianne Pendino
- Distributed by: United Entertainment
- Release date: 1986
- Running time: 77 minutes
- Country: United States
- Language: English

The Jet Benny Show is a 1986 science fiction parody film, in which the title character is a spoof of Jack Benny. The plot is a broad parody of the Star Wars films, and is deliberately low-budget in appearance.

== Synopsis ==
=== Opening ===
At the start of the film, we see a black-and-white television show, which appears to be The Jack Benny Program, although that name is never used. The host (Steve Norman) welcomes his special guest (Polly MacIntyre), and introduces the sketch for the evening (which is the body of the film, and in color).

=== The “sketch” ===
Jet Benny (Norman), a self-proclaimed “intergalactic soldier of fortune,” is traveling through space in his ship — the Maxwell, piloted by the android Rochester (Kevin Dees) — when the vessel loses power and crashes down on an unfamiliar planet. After Jet regains consciousness, Rochester and the Maxwell are nowhere to be found; Jet spends the next few years living in the woods like a hermit.

One day, Jet sees a woman (MacIntyre) being whipped and beaten by a thug and his henchmen, and he uses his raygun to scare them off. The woman turns out to be Princess Miranda; her family and people have been tyrannized by the forces of Lord Zane for the last few years, with the aid of android Rochester whose memory had been damaged by the crash.

After freeing Rochester and restoring his memory, the reluctant Jet is persuaded by Miranda into breaking into Zane's castle and freeing her brother, Prince Carmen (Richard Sabel). After escaping from the castle, the heroes take the Maxwell (which was in Zane's possession) to help Miranda's father, the King (Mark Walz); he and his people are in a walled city, which is being besieged by Zane's forces. The heroes win the battle, and the members of the royal family are reunited.

Jet is getting ready to leave the planet when Miranda catches up to him and kisses him; as a result, Jet, who had been eager to get away from the planet, is now reluctant to leave.

=== Closing ===
On the television show, the host thanks the guest and cast members for their work, and starts talking about next week's show.

== Low-budget look ==
Unlike the science fiction movies this film parodies, The Jet Benny Show was given a deliberate low-budget appearance; “outer space” was a black backdrop with large white lights poking through it, the spaceship had visible wires, action figures were used for a chase scene, et cetera. In one scene, the action was replaced with rotoscoped animation.

== Notes ==
- The names of the prince and princess were taken from Carmen Miranda, a fact that was made clear to the audience near the end of the movie.
- Rochester was named after Eddie Anderson’s character from The Jack Benny Program; besides the name, however, the two characters have nothing in common.
- Jet's vessel, the Maxwell, was named after the Maxwell automobile that Jack Benny claimed to own during sketches on his show.

== Availability ==
This movie has been released on VHS videocassette as well as Betamax, but not on DVD.
