= Garo Sparo =

American couture design house

- Industry: Fashion
- Founder: Garo Sparo
- Headquarters: New York City, New York, United States
- Website: www.garosparo.com

Garo Sparo is an American couture design house based in New York City. Its founder and head designer is Gary Spampinato, who goes professionally by Garo Sparo. Sparo is also a television personality who has starred on Unleashed by Garo on the Sundance Channel, and as a contestant on Bravo's Project Runway.

== Biography ==
Sparo moved from North Carolina to New York City in 1995 for an opportunity to show his designs at Absolut Alternative Fashion Week.

== Career ==
In 2000, Sparo opened the Garo Sparo Boutique on St. Mark's Place in Manhattan. At this time he began to focus heavily on corsetry and custom couture. His clientele rapidly grew to include many burlesque and drag icons, such as Miss Understood, Hedda Lettuce, Angie Pontani, World Famous *BOB* and Sequinette. He also has many clients who collect his custom day and evening wear such as fashion icon Daphne Guinness. Garo's designs have also been featured in commercials, films, dance performances and art installations. He is the resident designer for New York production company and sister organization Screaming Queens Entertainment.

== Unleashed by Garo ==
Unleashed by Garo is a six-episode television series about Garo Sparo and the world of fashion and design. It debuted on Sundance Channel in both the U.S. and Canada on September 9, 2011. In each episode, three clients visit Sparo's New York City studio. Participants vary from society brides looking for unique gowns, to performers seeking stagewear.

== Project Runway ==
Sparo was second runner-up on season 17 of Project Runway after Hester Sunshine and winner Sebastian Grey.
