= Queens at Heart =

1967 American short film

- Title screen
- Directed by: Unknown
- Starring: Misty, Vicky, Sonja, Simone
- Narrated by: Jay Martin
- Production company: Southeastern Pictures Corporation
- Release date: 1967
- Running time: 22 minutes
- Country: United States
- Language: English

Queens at Heart is an American short film described as both a documentary and an exploitation film in which four trans women are interviewed about their lives. It was produced in the mid-1960s. The film was digitally preserved in 2009 by the UCLA Film and Television Archive as part of the Outfest Legacy Project for LGBT Film Preservation. Andrea James and Jenni Olson were among those who worked on its restoration.

== Synopsis and cast ==
Four trans women from New York City are interviewed in what is professed to be part of a six-month psychological project. They are introduced as "contestants in a recent beauty contest". The four of them answer questions about their lives as trans women. They discuss having to present as male during the day at their jobs, undergoing hormone therapy, their dating lives, and their childhood. They also discuss the draft for the Vietnam War. In addition to the interviews, the film contains footage documenting a drag ball.

The four women give their names as Misty, Vicky, Sonja, and Simone. Full names are not used, since the interviewer notes the four of them are breaking a law against cross-dressing. Misty works as a bank teller, Vicky works as a cosmetician, Sonja is a hairdresser, and Simone works on window displays. The interviews are conducted by Jay Martin.

== Production and release ==
The film was anonymously made, and its production date is also unknown. The Southeastern Pictures Corporation initially released Queens at Heart alongside the 1967 film She-Man. Queens at Heart has subsequently been dated to around 1965 or 1967.

In the mid-1990s, Jenni Olson rediscovered the film after buying a 35 mm reel from a Kansas City projectionist for $75. An ad in the film collecting periodical The Big Reel brought it to her attention. Only a few prints of Queens at Heart existed, and the original negative has been lost. The film was digitally restored from two prints whose color had faded. The restoration was done by the UCLA Film and Television Archive for the Outfest Legacy Project for LGBT Film Preservation; it was completed in 2009. The film was the first to be deposited into the project's archive and its first restoration project. Funding for the film's restoration was provided by Joanne Herman, as well as the Andrew J. Kuehn, Jr. Foundation and Outfest; Andrea James, Tom Letness, Dick Millais, Jenni Olson, and Kristin Pepe were also involved in the restoration. Olsen's copy was subsequently acquired by the Harvard Film Archive.

The restored film screened at Outfest in 2010. Queens at Heart was screened at the Museum of Fine Arts, Boston in 2012 alongside two other films about early LGBT life: Mona's Candle Light (1950) and Choosing Children (1984). In 2019, the IFC Center in New York City played it alongside a restored version of the 1968 documentary The Queen. The film also appears on the video streaming platform Kanopy within the United States; it was added to its collection in 2016. Queens at Heart is a bonus feature on Kino Lorber's 2020 Blu-ray for The Queen. It is also available to watch via Vimeo. The UCLA Film & Television Archive uploaded Queens at Heart to YouTube in 2021.

== Critical response ==
In the 21st century, it has been variously described as a trans exploitation film, a short documentary film, and an "exploitation documentary short". However, critics have also noted it provides a candid look at the life of some transgender women in the time before the Stonewall riots. J. Hoberman for The New York Times called it "at once an exploitation film and an educational one, with a tone variously prurient, dismissive, and nonjudgemental". Sarah Fonseca for them. called it "a red-blooded American exploitation film that tries to pass itself off as an expert documentary" and criticized the interviewer but also said the four women's participation "has enormous value for those interested in queer and trans life before Stonewall." Olson has described this as "the most important film" that she found and "the most significant thing [she's] done as an archivist". The film is included among the Staff Picks on Kanopy. Film critics Caden Mark Gardner and Willow Catelyn Maclay wrote, "Even with some dated features, Queens at Heart is still a valuable, insightful look of trans women of the past."
