= The Queen (1968 film) =

1968 American documentary film by Frank Simon

- Directed by: Frank Simon
- Produced by: Si Litvinoff; Don Herbert
- Narrated by: Jack Doroshow
- Cinematography: Frank Simon; Ken van Sickle; Robert Elfstrom; Alfons Schilling (add); Joseph Zysman (add)
- Edited by: Fred Shore; Geraldine Fabrikant
- Distributed by: Grove Press
- Release date: May 10, 1968
- Running time: 68 minutes
- Country: United States
- Language: English

The Queen is a 1968 American documentary film directed by Frank Simon and featuring Flawless Sabrina. The film documents the experiences of drag queens who organized and participated in the 1967 Miss All-America Camp Beauty Contest, held at New York City's Town Hall.

The Queen was screened at the 1968 Cannes Film Festival before subsequent theatrical releases. The film was revived at Film Forum in New York City in 1993 and 2013, followed by a 4K restoration that was screened at the 2019 Melbourne International Film Festival. In 2020, Kino Lorber released the restored film on Blu-ray, with bonus footage, an interview with Flawless Sabrina, and the documentary Queens at Heart as additional features.

== Plot ==
Jack Doroshow, a gay man living in New York and working as the drag queen Flawless Sabrina, serves as emcee of the 1967 Miss All-America Camp Beauty Contest, held at Town Hall in New York City. The contestants are judged on walk, talk, bathing suit, gown, makeup, and hairdo, worth up to five points each, with beauty worth up to ten points. The judging panel includes artists Andy Warhol, Larry Rivers, and Jim Dine; writers Paul Krassner, Rona Jaffe, and Terry Southern; and actress Edie Sedgwick.

Between rehearsals and the competition, the contestants discuss draft boards, sexual identity, sex reassignment surgery, transgender identities, and life as drag queens. One contestant, Miss New Jersey Emore DuBois, recounts receiving a draft notice and being rejected for military service because of her feminine appearance, despite wanting to serve.

Sabrina's protégé, Miss Philadelphia Rachel Harlow, enters the competition alongside Miss Manhattan Crystal LaBeija. Both advance to the final five, where each contestant makes a final runway walk into the audience. Crystal is announced as fourth-place winner and, dissatisfied with the result, storms off the stage. Rachel is ultimately crowned Miss All-America Camp.

Several contestants protest Rachel's victory, while Crystal accuses Sabrina of fixing the contest and threatens legal action. Crystal encounters Rachel and Sabrina on the stairs as they leave the building, and Sabrina denies the allegation. The film ends with Rachel out of drag, walking through the Port Authority Bus Terminal while twirling her crown.

== Production ==
Pop artist and underground filmmaker Andy Warhol, who had attended one of Sabrina's early pageants in Pittsburgh, helped Sabrina secure financing and connect with executive producers. He arranged for Sabrina to receive $10,000 from the owner of Casey's restaurant in Greenwich Village and introduced her to producers whom he believed would give the project greater credibility. Sabrina later recalled that Warhol thought established producers might cause the film to be taken more seriously than if it were perceived as a "Warhol-esque sort of thing."

The film was shot over approximately five days, with additional camera crews brought in at different stages of production. Most of the footage was filmed as events unfolded, although several scenes were staged or improvised within defined situations. One such sequence, known as the "Washington Room," featured contestants from Washington, D.C., discussing their parents' reactions to their homosexuality and female impersonation, their views on sex reassignment surgery, and their experiences with the military draft. The filmmakers had expected the contestants to improvise their responses, but found that they spoke freely and produced an extended sequence that remained substantially intact in the finished film.

The production used Auricon cameras for much of the filming. A second camera crew worked for three days and a third for two days; on the final day, two additional crews filmed from the balcony to capture the pageant from a wider perspective.

== Release ==
The Queen premiered at the Presidio Theatre in San Francisco on May 10, 1968. That month, The Queen was screened at the Cannes Film Festival as part of Critics' Week. It opened at the Kips Bay Theatre in New York on June 17, 1968, where it set box-office records during its run. The film received theatrical releases in other parts of the United States and Europe during 1968 and 1969. It opened at the Paris Pullman Cinema in London on January 10, 1969.

== Reception ==
The Queen was screened at the 1968 Cannes Film Festival, where it attracted significant attention. Jack Doroshow later told Cinema magazine that the film "caused such an incredible sensation, not as a phenomenon, but as a film," generating "long lines" at its first screening, followed by "many bravos and much screaming." Doroshow recalled that writer Truman Capote became "very excited" about the film, while Roman Polanski called it "the best film of the Festival." Although the filmmakers had been expected to receive a special prize, Doroshow said the festival ended "anticlimactically"; additional screenings were nevertheless scheduled and again drew enthusiastic reactions. The attention at Cannes also led to numerous European distribution offers, with Doroshow reporting that French, Italian, Spanish, Swedish, Dutch, and Danish rights had been sold, while several British distributors were seeking the film.

=== Critical reception ===
Judith Crist of New York magazine praised The Queen for treating its potentially sensational subject matter with "sensibility, taste and compassion that what might have been a grind-house or underground movie emerges as an impressive human document."

Renata Adler of The New York Times called The Queen an "extraordinary documentary" that "shows us another America." She found the contestants compelling to watch, describing them as "colorful human beings whose entire self-image is a put-on, in their Atlantic City of Genet, in their Forest Hills of drag."

Kevin Thomas of the Los Angeles Times described the film as "a quite extraordinary documentary" and noted its "excellent color" cinematography and Frank Simon's "detached yet not uncompassionate direction." He observed that "much of the movie is devoted to a behind-the-scenes look at the show. Just as they vary in the degree to which they are effeminate in physique and demeanor, so do they in their views. (However, when it comes to fashion, they all seem to favor the Fredericks of Hollywood look.)"

Stanley Eichelbaum of the San Francisco Examiner wrote: "It's a very telling movie, done with a surprising degree of taste and intelligence and a sensible amount of compassion for the pathetic creatures who are driven by psycho-neurotic disorders into the bizarre, ambivalent and exhibitionist world of the drag queen. They are generally considered freaks (even by their homosexual confreres) and perfectly normal members of society are sufficiently curious to pay good money to see them, as performers in transvestite nightclubs, like our own Finocchio's, one of the more successful tourist attractions in town."

=== Subsequent assessments ===
In a retrospective piece written after the film's restoration, Jerry Portwood of Rolling Stone described The Queen as "extraordinary because it captures so much, doubling as a time capsule of a generation's innocence and fashion-forward sophistication. You can tell why it functioned as a template for many future gender-nonconforming people looking for some sort of pre-internet guide through the confusing maze of sexuality and gender."

Richard Brody of The New Yorker wrote that the film "reveals character through process, presenting personal revelations by observing quasi-public activities such as organizational meetings, rehearsals, a visit to a costume supplier, and the backstage management of the pageant. But there is also something intensely private and dangerously intimate to Simon's filming. At the time, both drag and homosexual relations were illegal in New York State."

== Legacy ==
=== Re-releases ===
In 1993, The Queen was revived for a limited engagement at Film Forum in Manhattan.

In January 2013, The Queen was revived at the Film Forum in New York, then restored in 2019 by Kino Lorber for screenings at the IFC Center and Melbourne International Film Festival.

In 2020, Kino Lorber released a Blu-ray of the restored version of The Queen, with bonus additional footage, an interview with Flawless Sabrina, and Queens at Heart as additional features.

=== Influence on popular culture ===
After her loss Crystal LaBeija founded the House of LaBeija. The film's concluding scene featuring Crystal has led to The Queen becoming a "cult favourite." Crystal's speech was sampled in the track "Ambience 001" in Frank Ocean's album Endless, and drag queen Aja (who would later join the House of LaBeija) impersonated LaBeija in season three of RuPaul's Drag Race: All Stars.

The Queen has often been compared to Paris Is Burning, a documentary focusing on the New York City drag ball scene of the 1980s, which includes in its cast members of the House of LaBeija.

== See also ==
- Drag pageantry
- Ball culture
