= She-Man (film) =

1967 film by Bob Clark

- Film poster
- Directed by: Bob Clark
- Screenplay by: Bob Clark; Jeff Gillen
- Story by: Harris Anders
- Produced by: Charles W. Broun Jr.
- Starring: Leslie Marlowe; Wendy Roberts; Dorian Wayne
- Cinematography: Gerhad Maser
- Edited by: Holt Gurnstein
- Music by: George Backahle
- Production company: Southeastern Pictures Corporation
- Release date: September 1967
- Running time: 68 minutes
- Country: United States
- Language: English

She-Man: A Story of Fixation (a.k.a. She-Man, for short) is a 1967 American film directed by Bob Clark and starring Leslie Marlowe. In this film, a former soldier becomes a cross-dresser.

== Plot ==
The film opens with a psychologist presenting the film as an account from the files of a research project, presented in story form. The psychologist emphasizes that the "type of individual" presented is factual, and an accurate account of a type of "deviation", encourages the audience to broaden their minds and sympathize with this type of person.

Albert Rose is introduced as a normal American man who is wealthy, athletic, handsome, and popular with women. One day Albert receives a mysterious letter, and quickly goes to a predetermined location in a motel. In the motel room, he is played recordings of statements that Albert deserted under fire during the Korean War. He is also played a recording of him talking with a prostitute. Albert is revealed to have paid a large sum of money to have a fellow soldier blamed for desertion instead. The speaker is revealed to be a mysterious woman named Dominita, who wants to force Albert to become her servant for one year, and pay her a sum of $20,000. Albert reluctantly accepts, pays Dominita the money, and accompanies her to her estate.

Albert is given four white estrogen pills each daily, and Dominita's assistant Ruth instructs Albert on becoming Dominita's maid. At first Albert protests, saying that he won't be turned into any "drag queen". But he then gradually accepts, shaving his entire body, having his eyebrows plucked, and wearing makeup, a wig, breast forms, and a French maid outfit. Albert insists that he will not take any more pills, but Ruth assures him that it is only a game.

Albert begins working for Dominita as a maid, using feminine pronouns, and using the name Rose Albert. When Albert begins to serve Dominita, she criticizes him and strikes him with a riding crop. After Albert leaves, Dominita tells Ruth that Albert "wanted" the punishment, and "needs to be dominated", but it took a traumatic situation to bring that out.

Albert and Ruth begin a romance, and Albert begins talking about a future together, in which he can continue to cross-dress in private, but lives as a man otherwise. Ruth reveals that she may not be attracted to Albert as a man, and she tells him about her upbringing, and how life events resulted in her becoming a lesbian. Albert tries to convince Ruth that he still has a "passive" and "feminine" side.

Albert continues to serve as Dominita's maid. While serving her a drink, Albert sees a scar on Dominita's leg. He finds a camera and secretly takes a photo of the scar, and has Ruth develop the photo, and to have copies made. Albert arranges for the staff of the house to meet the next morning. When Dominita finds the staff members gathered in one room, she becomes angry, and strikes a staff member with her riding crop. Albert confronts Dominita and pulls her wig off, revealing that she was Dominique Festro, a soldier who deserted in Korea, and who was shot in the leg by Albert. The staff members subdue Festro.

The psychologist appears again at his desk to give a summary and states that Albert is a "transvestite" who enjoys cross-dressing, with no change to his sexual orientation or to his emotions. Albert is contrasted with Dominita, who also desired power and superiority. The psychologist gives a disclaimer that the riding crop used was not about sadism, but merely a symbol of power and authority. The psychologist states that transvestism is considered a "perversion" punishable by law. He says that it is ridiculous for transvestism to be illegal, because many world leaders and religious officials wear robes and tunics similar to women's clothing, and many women wear clothing such as shorts, slacks, and jackets. He pleas for acceptance and understanding of transvestism.

== Cast ==
The cast members are as follows:

- Leslie Marlowe as Albert Rose
- Wendy Roberts as Ruth
- Dorian Wayne as Dominita
- Crystal Hans
- Diane O'Donnell
- Jeff Gillen
- Winnie Melton
- Norman Chant
- Virginia Jasper
- Marilyn Denham

Leslie Marlowe, who played Albert Rose, was a well-known female impersonator, or professional drag queen. He did drag performances throughout the country, including at well-known venues in San Francisco and New York City.

== Production ==
She-Man was filmed in Lehigh Acres, Florida, with a funeral parlor and a greenhouse providing the main sets. Locals played most of the roles, with the exception of the cross-dressers, who were professional female impersonators.

== Reception ==
In a review of She-Man in an issue of LadyLike magazine from 1995, the reviewer considered She-Man to be a "must see" for those who enjoy cross-dressing and cross-dressing themes in film. The review characterized the film plot as typical for cross-dressing fantasy:

The storyline reflects a typical CD fantasy. The "hero" is forced to "dress" and finds out rather quickly that he enjoys the transformation into femininity. He meets a GG who is attracted to his feminine side and they become lovers. This theme, in various forms, is often the plotline in most CD fiction.

An encyclopedia of gay and lesbian films described She-Man as "hilariously bad in all respects".

== Queens at Heart ==
The Southeastern Pictures Corporation initially released the exploitation documentary film Queens at Heart in 1967 along with She-Man. This short documentary film provides a rare look at four trans women in New York City, prior to the Stonewall riots.

== See also ==
- Cross-dressing § Legal issues
- List of American films of 1967
