= Children Shouldn't Play with Dead Things =

1972 film by Bob Clark

Children Shouldn't Play With Dead Things
- Theatrical release poster
- Directed by: Bob Clark (Note: Credited as Benjamin Clark.)
- Screenplay by: Alan Ormsby; Bob Clark
- Produced by: Bob Clark; Gary Goch
- Starring: Alan Ormsby; Jane Daly; Anya Ormsby; Jeffrey Gillen; Valerie Mamches; Paul Cronin; Seth Sklarey
- Cinematography: Jack McGowan
- Edited by: Gary Goch
- Music by: Carl Zittrer
- Production company: Brandywine Motionarts Films
- Distributed by: Geneni Film Distributors
- Release date: May 12, 1972
- Running time: 87 minutes
- Country: United States
- Language: English
- Budget: $50,000

Children Shouldn't Play with Dead Things (also known as Revenge of the Living Dead, Things from the Dead, and Zreaks) is a 1972 American comedy horror film directed by Bob Clark. It later became a cult classic. This low-budget zombie film is the third film of director Bob Clark, who later became famous for directing the films Black Christmas, A Christmas Story, and Porky's.

The film was shot in 14 days on a budget of $50,000. Clark employed some of his college friends on it.

In the film, a sadistic theatre director uses a necromantic ritual in an attempt to resurrect the dead in an island cemetery. The attempt backfires, as it creates aggressive zombies which attack the director and his theatrical troupe.

== Plot ==
The story focuses on a theatre troupe who travel by boat to a small island off the coast of Miami that is mainly used as a cemetery for deranged criminals, to have a night of fun and games. Their director Alan (Alan Ormsby), a twisted, sadistic individual, tells his group — whom he refers as his "children" — numerous stories relating to the island's history and buried inhabitants.

Alan leads them to a cottage, where they are supposed to spend the night. He then opens a chest they have brought with him, puts on a mystical robe and prepares them for a summation at midnight, with threats of firing them if they do not do as he pleases. At midnight, using a grimoire, Alan begins a Satanic ritual to raise the dead after digging up the body of a man named Orville Dunworth (Seth Sklarey). Though the original intent of the ritual may have been just a joke, Alan appears disappointed that nothing happens.

The party continues, and Alan goes to extremes to degrade the actors, using Orville's corpse for his own sick jokes. Then, however, animated by the fell ritual, the dead return to life and force the troupe to take refuge in the old house. Trapped, they conduct a plan to lure the zombies to the front of the house whilst one of the group, Paul, runs out the back to go get help. The plan doesn't work, as Paul is ambushed by a zombie and devoured. While crying over his loss, Terry is taken away by other zombies.

In a last ditch effort, Alan attempts to read another spell from the book of the dead to return the zombies to their graves. It appears to work as the zombies begin to dissipate into the forest. However, they fail to abide by the rule of returning Orville's corpse to his grave, leading the zombies to re-emerge and ambush the group as they leave the house. Two members of the group, Jeff and Val are killed, whilst Alan and Anya retreat back to the house. Despite barricading the door, the zombies burst through, pursuing them up the stairs. In an effort to save himself, Alan throws Anya to the zombies; but the zombies continue to focus their attention on Alan and chase him up the stairs. Alan locks himself in the bedroom where he left Orville's corpse, but now finds Orville animated into unlife too. Orville attacks and brings down Alan, followed by the rest of the zombies crashing through the door.

In the movie's closing credits, the zombies board Alan's boat as the lights of Miami shine in the background.

== Cast ==
- Alan Ormsby as Alan
- Valerie Mamches as Val
- Jeff Gillen as Jeff
- Anya Ormsby as Anya
- Paul Cronin as Paul
- Jane Daly as Terry
- Roy Engleman as Roy
- Robert Philip as Emerson
- Bruce Solomon as Winns
- Alecs Baird as Caretaker
- Seth Sklarey as Orville Dunworth

== Production ==
Principal photography took place in Florida on a budget of $50,000. Filming was underway in Miami in September 1971.

== Release ==
Children Shouldn't Play with Dead Things was released theatrically as a double feature with The Dunwich Horror in Mobile, Alabama and Pensacola, Florida on May 12, 1972.

=== Home media ===
Although previously available on VHS, a special edition DVD was released in 2007 by VCI Entertainment. It features the uncut version of the film, a photo gallery, and a cast commentary. The same content was briefly made available on VHS through Anchor Bay Entertainment.

On February 23, 2016, VCI released the film on Blu-ray. VCI issued a 4K UHD Blu-ray on December 6, 2022.

== Reception ==
Encyclopedia of Horror concludes that given the budget and the number of personnel involved, the special effects by Alan Ormsby are "surprisingly effective".

James Lowder reviewed Children Shouldn't Play with Dead Things in White Wolf Inphobia #51 (Jan., 1995), rating it a 2 out of 5 and stated that "Clark boasts a filmography that defies reason. Aside from Children Shouldn't Play with Dead Things and Deathdream, he's helmed such superior films as A Christmas Story and the slick Sherlock Holmes/Jack the Ripper period piece, Murder by Decree. But he's also directed such whopping great honkers as Porky's 2, From the Hip and the Stallone/Parton fiasco, Rhinestone."

In his book Zombiemania: 80 Movies to Die For, author Arnold T. Blumberg observed that "the end is ... pretty creepy, with the credits running silently over the strangely surreal shot of the zombies preparing a sailboat for launching," adding that the film conjures "an atmosphere of inevitability and hopelessness. But then again, Ormsby managed that before the first dead body clawed its way out of the ground."

As of July 2019, the film holds a score of 42% on Rotten Tomatoes, based on 12 reviews, with an average rating of 5.2/10.

== Proposed remake ==
Director Bob Clark was planning a remake before his death in 2007. In November 2010, Gravesend Film Enterprises confirmed it would produce a remake, set to begin filming in Spring 2011, although this never came to pass.

== See also ==
- List of American films of 1972

== Sources ==
- Russell, Jamie (2005). Book of the Dead: The Complete History of Zombie Cinema. London, England: FAB Press. ISBN 978-1-903-25433-2.
