= Chicago Underground Film Festival =

Annual international film festival in the US

- Location: Chicago, Illinois, U.S.
- Founded: 1993
- Language: International
- Website: http://www.cuff.org

The Chicago Underground Film Festival (CUFF) is an annual nonprofit international festival dedicated to the exhibition of underground and avant-garde cinema, video, and performance. The festival offers an opportunity for independent artists who are frequently overlooked by other conventional, market-driven film festivals to showcase and be recognized for their work though jury and audience awards. In addition to screenings, the festival also hosts events to build community amongst the audience. Founded in 1993, the festival is widely regarded as the longest running festival of its kind.

== History ==
The festival was founded in 1993 by Jay Bliznick with Mark Siska and Bryan Wendorf as an alternative to the mainstream film festival circuit, which was increasingly dominated by distributor product. The festival celebrated its 30-year anniversary in 2023. The festival's stated goal is "to focus on the artistic, aesthetic, and fun side of independent filmmaking." CUFF promotes works that dissent radically in form, content, and technique from both the tired conventions of Hollywood and the increasingly stagnant IndieWood mainstream. The festival has an excellent reputation for curation and has become known for being one of the key events in the history of the underground. In February 2008 it was announced that the festival has become an official program of IFP/Chicago Independent Feature Project. From 2009 to 2010, the festival Was held at the Gene Siskel Film Center, a state of the art cinematheque connected to the School of the Art Institute of Chicago since 2011 the festival has been held at the Logan Theatre in Chicago, a popular independent movie theater on city's North side. The festival runs over the course of several days, featuring an extensive lineup of films, videos, and performances, as well as parties and concerts. In 2019 the festival once again became an independent organization and in 2022 it received its 501(c)3 not-for-profit status.

== Purpose ==
CUFF welcomes a mix of films and videos of all lengths and genres, but the festival's dominant focus is on works that chart new, experimental ground in form or content. The festival's mission is to showcase a selection of diverse films, videos, and related works to highlight filmmakers who take unconventional approaches to filmmaking and work to break boundaries in form, narrative, and length. It aims to provide audiences with a wide range of programming to promote innovative forms of media art and build an audience and community around the work.

== Festival program and events ==
While the festival has always explored the many different definitions of underground film, in its early years the festival's programming consisted mainly of low-budget b-movies and films in the tradition of the Cinema of Transgression but more recently moved its to focus more toward experimental and avant-garde films and videos and documentaries.The festival programming is diverse and varied and the festival's objective is to showcase the defiantly independent filmmaker by promoting film and video that challenges and transcends expectations. The festival has also featured retrospectives of legendary underground filmmakers such as John Waters, Kenneth Anger, and Alejandro Jodorowsky. The festival screens 100 films and hosts workshops, Q&A's, and after-parties to encourage discussions about underground art and build a community among attendees.

== Awards ==
The festival jury presents six jury awards to films and videos selected as the best or most interesting in various categories well as "Made in Chicago" awards, which recognize films and videos made by local filmmakers. The jury awards vary from year to year and are determined by the current year's jury. Some awards given are more typical for festivals, such as "Best Documentary," while others can be more creative and specific to the winning film, such as "Radical Empathy Award." Audience choice awards and honorable mentions also given in addition in order to recognize other outstanding films at the festival. The film festival accepts a wide range of genres and styles of films for submission. The nine categories for festival submission are narrative feature, narrative short, documentary feature, documentary short, experimental feature, experimental short, animation feature, animation short, and music video.

== Past winners ==
2022 Winners
Award	Film Title	Director(s)	Nationality	Source
Grand Jury Prize	My Mother's Cat	Annabella Schnabel	Hungary	
Best Short Narrative	Pretty Pickle	Jim Vendiola	United States	
Best Narrative Feature	Endless Content Forever	Jacob Gregor	United States	
Best Experimental Short	Judy's Thoughts	Melody Gilbert	United States	
Best Experimental Feature	The Lost Record	Alexandra Cabral, Ian Svenonius	United States	
Best Documentary	Circus of the Scars: The Insider Odyssey of the Jim Rose Circus Slideshow	Cory Wees	United States	
Best Animation	Boys Clap, Girls Dance	Dena Springer	United States	
Audience Award	Provo	Emma Thatcher	United States	

2020 Winners
Award	Film Title	Director(s)	Nationality	Source
The Race to Hell Award	The Deepest Hole	Matt McCormick	United States	
Badass Bolex Award	Felix in Wonderland	Marie Losier		
Best Ghost Music Video Hybrid Feature	Ghost of the Golden Groves	Aniket Dutta, Roshni Sen		
Best in a Graveyard Short	Blessed Land	Phạm Ngọc Lân		
Best Pixelated Curiosity	Magic Explained	Paul Tarragó		
Honorable Mention	( ( ( ( ( /*\ ) ) ) ) )	Charles Fairbanks, Saul Kak		
Audacious Animation Award	Umbilical	Danski Tang		
Audience Award	Paper Shadows	Robert C. Banks Jr.		
Honorable Mention	Supermarket	Gianluca Abbate		

2018 Winners
Award	Film Title	Director(s)	Nationality	Source
Industrial Accident: The Story of Wax Trax! Records	Audience Award	Julia Nash	Country	source
Serpents and Doves	Honorable Mention: Short Documentary	Nellie Kluz		
On the Rink	Made in Chicago Award	Benjamin Buxton		
Black Dog	Honorable Mention: Animation	Joshua Tuthill		
Dream Journal	2018 | Honorable Mention: Surrealist Daymare	Jon Rafman		
Anti-Objects, or Space Without Path or Boundary	Best Experimental Film	Sky Hopinka		
The White World According to Daliborek	The Most "Problematic"	Vít Klusák		
V/IRL	Best Documentary Short	Malia Bruker		
Tomorrow Never Knows	Radical Empathy Award	Adam Sekuler		
Girl Powder	Best Comedy Short	Annelise Ogaard		
Common Carrier	Honorable Mention: Experimental Narrative	James N. Kienitz Wilkins		
Craigslist Allstars	Spirit of CUFF	Samira Elagoz		
