= Just Before Dawn (1981 film) =

1981 American slasher film directed by Jeff Lieberman

- Theatrical release poster
- Directed by: Jeff Lieberman
- Written by: Jeff Lieberman; Mark Arywitz; Jonas Middleton
- Produced by: David Sheldon
- Starring: Chris Lemmon; Gregg Henry; Deborah Benson; Ralph Seymour; Jamie Rose; Mike Kellin; George Kennedy
- Cinematography: Dean King; Joel King
- Edited by: Robert Q. Lovett
- Music by: Brad Fiedel
- Production company: Oakland Productions
- Distributed by: Picturmedia
- Release date: November 27, 1981
- Running time: 90 minutes
- Country: United States
- Language: English
- Budget: $1 million
- Box office: < $1 million

Just Before Dawn is a 1981 American slasher film directed by Jeff Lieberman and starring Chris Lemmon, Gregg Henry, Deborah Benson, Ralph Seymour, Jamie Rose, and George Kennedy. The film follows a group of hikers who travel into a mountainous region of Oregon to visit property inherited by one of them, only to be hunted by a ruthless backwoods killer.

Inspired by Deliverance (1972), Lieberman rewrote an original screenplay by Mark Arywitz and Jonas Middleton, which was originally set in Tennessee and featured prominent religious themes. Principal photography began in July 1980 at Silver Falls State Park in Silverton, Oregon. The original musical score was one of the earlier works of Brad Fiedel, who went on to compose the scores for such films as The Terminator (1984) and Fright Night (1985).

Just Before Dawn was distributed in the United States by the independent company Picturmedia, who released it theatrically on November 27, 1981. The film was not a commercial success and received mixed reviews, with many highlighting its elegant cinematography, and others criticizing the film for its derivative elements. The film has been noted by film scholars for expanding on tropes found in horror films such as The Texas Chain Saw Massacre (1974) and The Hills Have Eyes (1977), though Lieberman has emphatically stated he had seen neither film, and his intentions were to make a thriller with elements of an art film.

== Plot ==
In a rural, mountainous region of Oregon, drunken hunters Ty and Vachel come across an abandoned church, which they explore. After Ty sees their truck being crashed into a tree, Vachel is castrated with a serrated machete by a chuckling assailant who then dons Vachel's hat and jacket. Ty, seeing the murderer exit the church, quietly flees off into the forest. Meanwhile, forest ranger Roy McLean encounters an RV of five college-aged adults heading to rural property which one of them has inherited. Despite his insistence that they not venture up the mountain, the five continue along. Among them are Warren; his girlfriend Constance; Jonathan, and his girlfriend, Megan; and Daniel, Jonathan's brother.

On their way up the mountain, they hit a deer, and encounter Ty stumbling through the woods on his way down the mountain; they dismiss his warnings of "demons," as he is visibly drunk. After reaching a point where the RV cannot drive any further, the group set out on foot and make a campsite; at night, while around the fire, Constance, Megan, and Daniel hear noises around them and become frightened, only to find that Jonathan and Warren are playing a prank. The next morning, they hike along Silver Creek to a waterfall, where they see a young girl named Merry Cat Logan singing before noticing their presence and running into the woods. Megan and Jonathan go skinny dipping at the bottom of the falls, unaware that someone else has entered the water. Megan feels hands touching her and assumes it to be Jonathan, until she sees him on shore, whereupon she panics and swims to safety.

When the group splits up to go exploring, Jonathan spots Merry and chases after her. She runs to a clearing but sees something that frightens her and hides behind some trees. Jonathan assumes it is the rope bridge over the waterfall ahead and begins to go across, only to be confronted by the killer, who cuts his hand with his machete. The killer severs the bridge and Jonathan plummets into the water below. Unable to swim, he attempts to climb back up over the ledge using the rope. When he reaches the ledge, the killer kicks him in the face, and he falls to his demise. Meanwhile, Megan and Daniel are taking photographs in the woods, and come across the church and a graveyard. Daniel, who has lost his glasses, sees a figure emerging through the trees, and assumes it to be Jonathan. He and Megan pretend to kiss as a joke, but as the figure comes closer, Daniel realizes it is not his brother. The figure stabs Daniel, and Megan flees into the church, where she watches through the window as the killer investigates Daniel's camera. Suddenly, another identical man emerges behind her inside the church; Megan realizes that the two are identical twins. She is murdered in the church while the other twin photographs her death from outside the window.

Warren and Constance (now barefoot and in shorts) return to the camp, but cannot find anyone else. While wading through the river, they encounter Jonathan's body floating downstream, and pull him out. As night approaches, Warren leaves Constance at the campsite to retrieve the car keys from Jonathan's body, but cannot find them; nearby, he finds Jonathan's body against a tree. Meanwhile, Ty finally encounters Roy in the woods and tells him about the twins at the church. Roy goes out on his horse to find the teens, and comes across Merry's family, Pa and Ma Logan. They tell him that the twins were actually their own and their mother died during childbirth, so Pa raped his daughter and had Merry. Left alone, Constance is attacked by one of the twins, who chases her up a tree. The twin cuts down the tree, and just before he is about to kill Constance, Roy shoots him and he tells the couple to go pack their items. They go back to camp, as Merry runs through the woods to find them. At camp, the other twin stabs Warren and tries to kill Constance, who rams her fist down his throat, choking him to death. Warren begins to sob and Merry watches from the trees, as the sun rises in the forest.

== Cast ==
- Chris Lemmon as Jonathan
- Gregg Henry as Warren
- George Kennedy as Roy McLean
- Deborah Benson as Constance
- Ralph Seymour as Daniel
- Mike Kellin as Ty
- Jamie Rose as Megan
- John Hunsaker as The Mountain Twins (Luther & Lucas)
- Katie Powell (as Kati Powell) as Merry Cat Logan
- Charles Bartlett as Vachel
- Hap Oslund as Pa Logan
- Barbara Spencer as Ma Logan

== Themes ==
Jon Towlson writes in Lost Souls of Horror and the Gothic: Fifty-Four Neglected Authors, Actors, Artists and Others (2016) that Just Before Dawn exemplifies survivalist-themed horror, "emphasizing the conversion to savagery of the heroine, Connie." The film has been noted by several film scholars as expanding on tropes found in the films The Texas Chain Saw Massacre (1974) and The Hills Have Eyes (1977), despite director Lieberman stating he had seen neither of those films and was not influenced by them.

Though exhibiting prominent slasher film elements, Lieberman stated he never intended to make a slasher film, instead aiming to craft a survival thriller with elements of an art film.

== Production ==
=== Development ===
The film's original screenplay, based on a story by Jonas Middleton (a.k.a. Joseph Middleton), was titled The Tennessee Mountain Murders, and later The Last Ritual, and had heavy religious themes behind the twin killers' motives. It also included a sixth camper named Eileen and a different fate for Megan, which entailed her being tossed to her death over a cliff, as well as a climax involving Connie being forced to handle rattlesnakes by the inbred villains before becoming one of their wives; this version of the script also had more involvement from the Logan family, who were part of the scheme.

Jeff Lieberman, who had previously directed the horror films Squirm (1976) and Blue Sunshine (1978), was offered the project and extensively rewrote the screenplay under the pseudonym Gregg Irving, inspired by thriller films such as Deliverance (1972):

They offered me more money than I ever made before, to go to Oregon and shoot this film. They did the exact same thing: they pre-sold the movie, claiming they had George Kennedy and Linda Blair as the stars and me as a director. But I hated the script. It was called The Last Ritual, it was about a snake ritual in the Smoky Mountains. I don’t even remember why they had a snake ritual in there, but it was important enough to the story that they called it that. I thought the script was awful and I did a page one rewrite, under pseudonym. I used the first and middle name of my nephew who had just been born. I totally rewrote it.

While the film was in pre-production, Paramount Pictures released the slasher film Friday the 13th (1980), which became a swift box-office hit. Based on the success of the film, the producers of Just Before Dawn urged Lieberman to integrate a high number of violent killings in the screenplay: "But I didn’t want to do that. I didn’t even think I could do it. You still have to tell an actress: Go walk outside and you’ll get a hatchet in your forehead. If she has any brains at all, she’s gonna ask why she’s going outside. And I, Jeff Lieberman, would have to say: Well, because you can’t get a hatchet in your head in front of all these people in the living room. That’s not the guy you want to direct a movie like this."

=== Filming ===
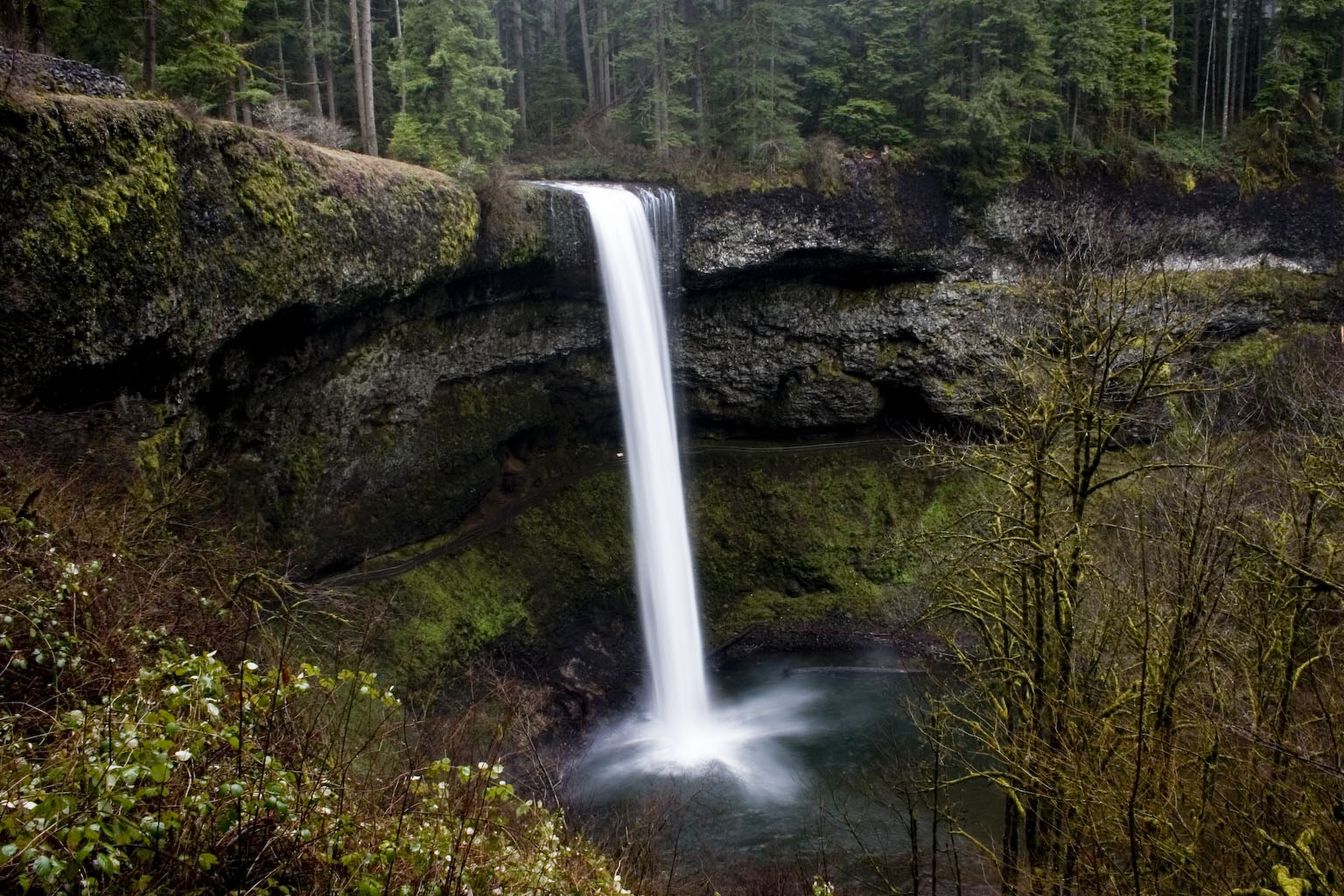
Silver Falls State Park served as the primary filming location.

The film was shot on location in 1980 at the Silver Falls State Park in Sublimity, Oregon, just outside nearby Salem, and an hour away from Portland, Oregon. Due to the film's low budget, filming time ranged from 14 to 15 hours per day. According to actor Chris Lemmon, the 1980 eruption of Mt. St. Helens occurred during filming; by Lemmon's account, he and the rest of the cast were gone for the day on a trip to the Oregon coast when the eruption occurred. Per a June 1980 newspaper article, however, filming was officially slated to begin on July 7, on a budget of approximately $1 million.

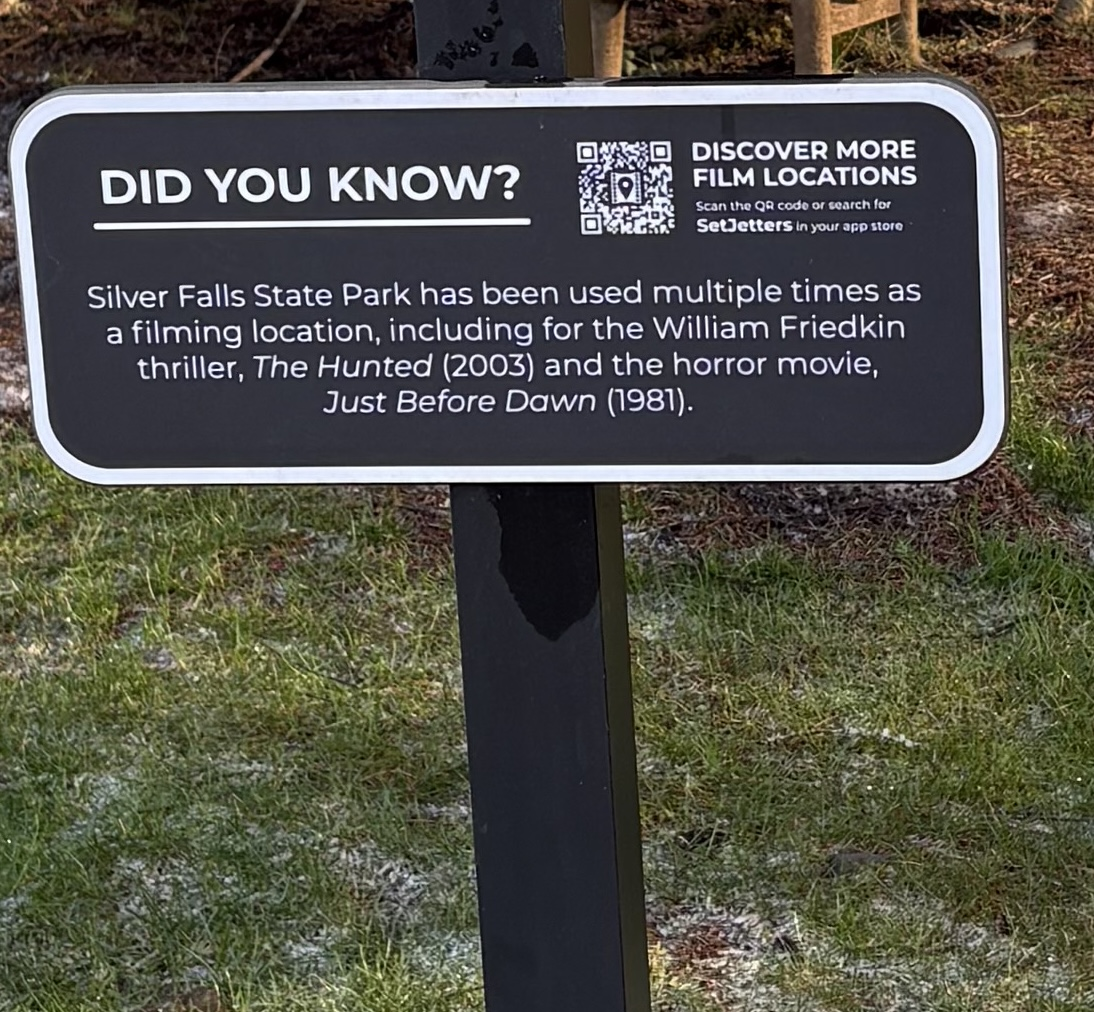
Plaque in Silver Falls State Park marking it as a filming location for Just Before Dawn

Effects designer Matthew Mungle, who had previously worked on films such as Roar (1981) and later, the slasher film The Dorm That Dripped Blood (1982), designed the film's prosthetics and special effects. Despite its authentic, weathered appearance, the church used in the film was actually built for the production. Lieberman recalled that numerous strangers arrived at the filming location to watch actress Jamie Rose perform a scene while skinny-dipping; Lieberman said that word of the shoot had apparently gotten out among the local forest rangers.

Several odd occurrences happened during the shooting of the film: While shooting in the woods one evening, the lighting went out without explanation, leaving the cast and crew in complete darkness. After several minutes the producer yelled out 'let there be light!', and the lights immediately returned without explanation. According to Lieberman, despite the numerous reviews of Just Before Dawn that implied it was inspired by The Texas Chain Saw Massacre (1974) or The Hills Have Eyes (1977), he had not seen either film at the time of making Just Before Dawn. Lieberman also stated that he was influenced by Ingmar Bergman when assembling some of the film's nature compositions. Filming officially completed on August 9, 1980.

== Music ==
The musical score for Just Before Dawn was one of the earlier works by composer Brad Fiedel, who went on to compose the scores for Eyes of Fire (1983), The Terminator (1984), and Fright Night (1985). The eerie whistling motif heard in the score is a reference to the rescue whistle that Warren carries in the film. According to Fiedel, many of the ominous sounds in the music score were actually electronically altered audio clips of himself vocalizing droning noises, in addition to the use of a synthesizer.

The film features the song "Heart of Glass" by Blondie in its opening scene.

== Release ==
Universal Pictures initially expressed interest in acquiring the film for distribution, but eventually backed out. Instead, the film was distributed by Picturmedia, a small independent company. Just Before Dawn was given a regional theatrical release in the United States, beginning on November 27, 1981, screening in Miami. It was also shown in several other nearby Florida cities the following week, including Fort Lauderdale and Palm Beach. It was released in Kingsport, Tennessee on December 11. The film was showing in Philadelphia, Pennsylvania the following year, beginning October 8, 1982.

In the United Kingdom, the film was released theatrically in the summer the following year, opening in Birmingham on August 15, 1982, with an X rating. The film was released in France under the title Survivance in an attempt to capitalize on the popularity of John Boorman's Deliverance.

=== Home media ===
Just Before Dawn was released on DVD in 2005 from Media Blasters on their Shriek Show imprint in a 2-disc special edition and features a director's commentary, as well as a documentary on the making of the film.

Media Blasters' rights to the film then expired, and it was re-released on Blu-ray and DVD by Code Red DVD in November 2013. This release is completely uncut, and also features the longer international version with additional dialogue and 12 minutes of additional footage. A new deluxe edition Blu-ray was released through Code Red on May 6, 2019. Kino Lorber reissued the deluxe edition Blu-ray on January 21, 2021.

== Reception ==
Jim Davidson of The Pittsburgh Press panned the film upon its initial release, writing: "The only suspense in this appalling 1980 movie... lies in anticipating the who and when of the next stabbing", adding that "director Jeff Lieberman uses forest locations and a full set of dark filters that disguise the cheapness of the production".

Jim Vorel of Paste magazine praised the film's use of location, writing: "This is a slasher film utterly defined by its uniquely mysterious and beautiful location, a factor that elevates a run-of-the-mill story into something truly unique... [the film] offers up some of the more beautiful nature photography you’re ever going to see in a horror movie. Considering the low aims of this standard slasher plot, the result is almost unaccountably beautiful, just thanks to locations such as huge, cascading waterfalls and rickety rope bridges. Thematically, it lends power to the idea that this group of young people must pay for the crime of disrespecting the sanctity of this place, because this place looks worthy of somehow summoning a demented killer to it."

TV Guide gave the film an unfavorable review, deeming it a "crushing disappointment from director Jeff Lieberman, whose Squirm (1976) and Blue Sunshine (1977) were two of the more interesting genre efforts of the 1970s" and comparing negatively to The Hills Have Eyes (1977).

Todd Martin from HorrorNews.net gave the film a positive review, praising the film's script, soundtrack, and bleak tone, calling it "one of the most underrated slasher flicks of all time". Dennis Schwartz from Ozus' World Movie Reviews awarded the film a grade C+. In his review of the film, Schwwartz wrote: "Fans of slasher films should be drawn to the blood and gore that is so beautifully shot and is not as graphic as it could have been. If not a devotee of this genre, you will probably find it repulsive, slack and moronic". Justin Kerswell from Hysteria Lives! gave the film 4/5 stars, praising the film's acting, characters, cinematography, and direction, calling it "a superb film which stands head-and-shoulders above the usual backwoods slasher movie". AllMovie's review of the film was favorable, writing: "Anyone lucky enough to fish out a copy of director Jeff Lieberman's Just Before Dawn will certainly find themselves richly rewarded".

On the review aggregator website Rotten Tomatoes, 60% of 5 critics' reviews are positive, with an average rating of 6.7/10.

== Sources ==
- DuPée, Matthew C. (2022). A Scary Little Christmas: A History of Yuletide Horror Films, 1972-2020. Jefferson, North Carolina: McFarland & Company. ISBN 978-1-476-67999-0.
- Hischak, Thomas S. (2015). The Encyclopedia of Film Composers. Lanham, Maryland: Rowman & Littlefield. ISBN 978-1-442-24550-1.
- Nowell, Richard (2010). Blood Money: A History of the First Teen Slasher Film Cycle. London, England: Bloomsbury. ISBN 978-1-441-12496-8.
- Towlson, Jon (2016). "Jeff Lieberman". In McCarthy, Elizabeth; Murphy, Bernice M. (eds.). Lost Souls of Horror and the Gothic: Fifty-Four Neglected Authors, Actors, Artists and Others. Jefferson, North Carolina: McFarland & Company. pp. 130–134. ISBN 978-1-476-62653-6.
