= Dukakis =

Dukakis (Greek: Δουκάκης) is a surname. Notable people with the surname include:

- John Dukakis (born John A. Chaffetz), actor, son of Kitty Dukakis and stepson of Michael Dukakis
- Kitty Dukakis (Katharine D. Dukakis), author, wife of Michael Dukakis
- Michael Dukakis, former Massachusetts governor and 1988 Democratic Party presidential candidate
- Olympia Dukakis, American actress, cousin of Michael Dukakis
