= Alice Nunn =

American actress (1927–1988)

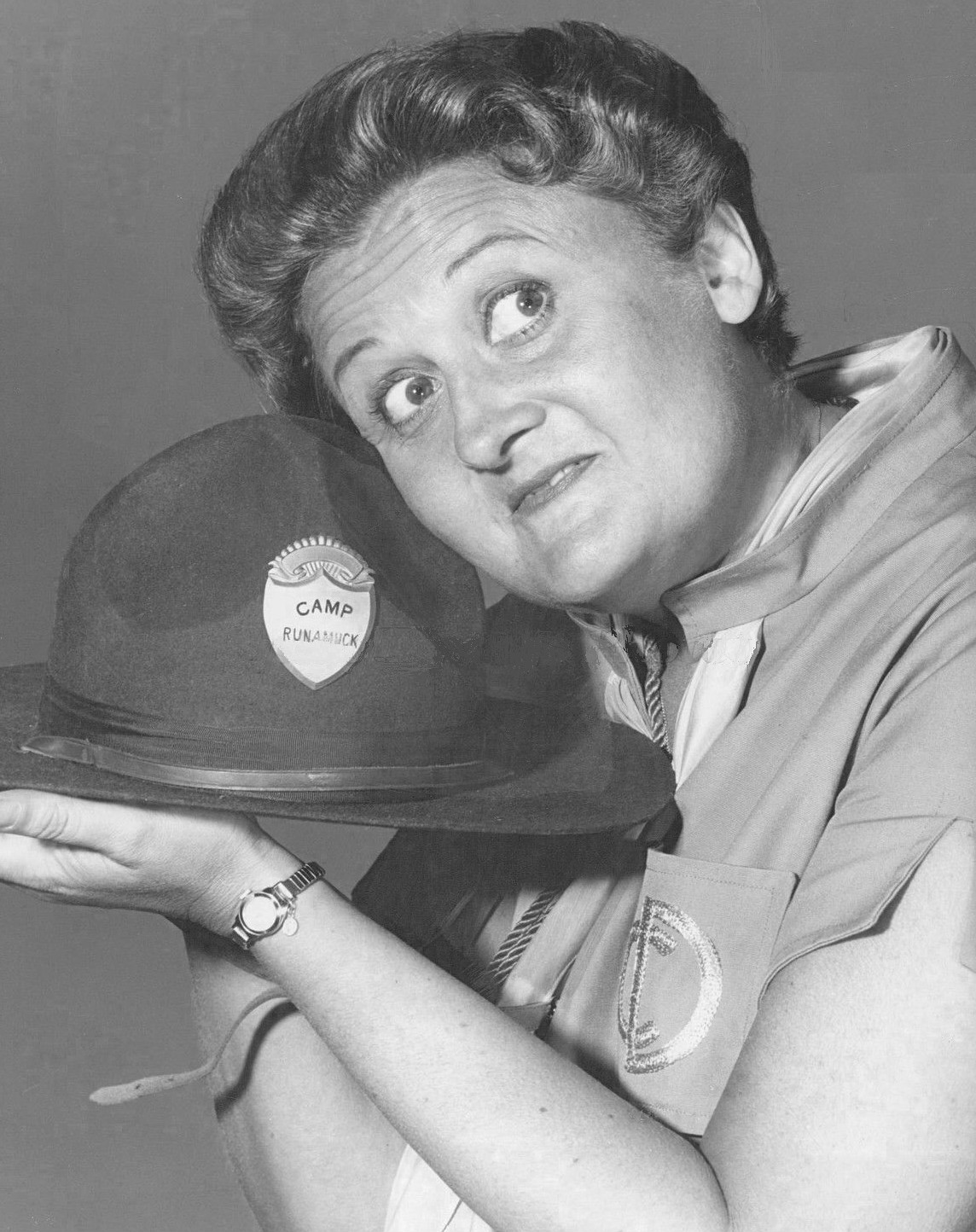
- Nunn in 1965
- Born: Alice Elizabeth Nunn; October 10, 1927; Jacksonville, Florida, U.S.
- Died: July 1, 1988 (aged 60); West Hollywood, California, U.S.
- Resting place: Old Jacksonville City Cemetery, Florida
- Occupation: Actress
- Years active: 1956–1988

Alice Elizabeth Nunn (October 10, 1927 – July 1, 1988) was an American actress. She was born in Jacksonville, Florida, and died at her apartment in West Hollywood, California of a heart attack. Although she played many roles across her 31-year career, appearing in more than 50 films and TV series, she is primarily remembered for her role as Large Marge, the ghost of a storied truck driver, in Tim Burton's 1985 film Pee-wee's Big Adventure, which is number 5 on the IFC list of the 25 scariest moments in non-horror film history, and earned her a cult following.

== Life and career ==
Nunn was born in Jacksonville in 1927 to N.G. Nunn and Alice Bush. She showed an early interest in the performing arts and took part in a school production of My Sister Eileen. She studied acting at Wesleyan University and took classes with the American Theater Wing. After some radio work, she got an acting part in New Faces of 1956 and played in the theatre alongside Shelley Berman and Nancy Walker.

She became a character actress, and appeared on television's Petticoat Junction in the episodes "Shoplifter at the Shady Rest" (1967, as Mrs. Benson); "Mae's Helping Hand" (1968); and the 1969 episodes "The Other Woman" (as Mrs. Birdwell) and "Kathy Joe's First Birthday Party" (as "Lady with wallet"). She also appeared on Ironside and The Wild Wild West.

She appeared in numerous sitcoms, such as Camp Runamuck, where she played Mahala May Gruenecker, the head counselor of Camp Divine, and the chief opponent of Commander Wivenhoe (played by series star Arch Johnson). In her sitcom appearances in the 1960s, she often played strong-willed, edgy women, but in a humorous vein.

Nunn's first film appearance was in Johnny Got His Gun (1971) where she played a nurse. She was a regular cast member of the Tony Orlando and Dawn variety show; and has small parts in films such as the "Fat Lady" in Mame (1974), and in Airport 1975. She appeared as Mrs. Callahan in Brian De Palma's The Fury (1978). She played Duffy the Cook in Alan Beattie's slasher/mystery Delusion (1980) (also known as The House Where Death Lives) with Patricia Pearcy and Joseph Cotten, and the maid Helga in Mommie Dearest (1981).

She is most widely known for her role as Large Marge, a ghostly truck driver who frightens Pee-wee Herman in the film Pee-wee's Big Adventure (1985), providing what has been called one of the scariest moments in non-horror film history. In Trick or Treat (1986), she played Mrs. Sylvia Cavell, and appeared in Who's That Girl (1987) with Madonna. Her last role was that of Nurse Palmer in Three O'Clock High (1987).

== Death ==
Nunn died in 1988 at her apartment in West Hollywood, California of a heart attack at age 60.

== Filmography ==
Film
Year	Title	Role	Notes
1971	Johnny Got His Gun	Third Nurse	
1971	The Steagle	Mrs. Furst	Uncredited
1974	Mame	Fat Lady	
1974	Airport 1975	Passenger with Dog	Uncredited
1974	Fangs	Sis	
1978	The Fury	Mrs. Callahan	
1978	The Fifth Floor	Emma	
1981	Delusion	Duffy	
1981	Mommie Dearest	Helga	
1983	Focus on Fishko	Old Mimi	Short
1985	Pee-wee's Big Adventure	Large Marge	
1986	Thrashin'	Truck Driver	Uncredited
1986	Trick or Treat	Mrs. Sylvia Cavell	
1987	Who's That Girl	Woman Parole Member	
1987	Three O'Clock High	Nurse Palmer	

Television
Year	Title	Role	Notes
1965	Hazel	Hildegarde	Episode: "Hazel's Inquisitive Mind"
1965-1966	Camp Runamuck	Mahala May Gruenecker / Mahala May	21 episodes
1967	The Phyllis Diller Show	Mrs. Hill	Episode: "Phyllis, the Beauty Queen"
1967	Judd for the Defense	Mrs. Merrell	Episode: "A Civil Case of Murder"
1968	The Wild Wild West	Hilda	Episode: "The Night of the Big Blackmail"
1967-1969	Petticoat Junction	Mrs. Benson / Lady With Wallet / Mrs. Birdwell	4 episodes
1970	The Bill Cosby Show	Winona Fisk	Episode: "Growing, Growing, Grown"
1971	Mayberry R.F.D.	Mrs. Plunkett	Episode: 'Millie's Egg Farm"
1971	The Jimmy Stewart Show	Big Mother	Episode: "Another Day, Another Scholar"
1972	Evil Roy Slade	Claire Beckendorf	TV movie
1972	McMillan & Wife	Woman / Mrs. Maxwell	2 episodes
1972	Ironside	Mrs. Winston	Episode: "Buddy, Can You Spare a Life?"
1972	Emergency!	Mrs. Lucille Rodgers	Episode: "Musical Mania"
1972	Alias Smith and Jones	Hotel Clerk	Episode: "McGuffin"
1974	Tony Orlando and Dawn	Regular	
1975	Love Nest		TV movie
1976	ABC Afterschool Special	Connie	Episode: "Francesca, Baby"
1977	Great Day	Molly	TV movie
1977	Westside Medical	Carrie	13 episodes
1978	Chico and the Man	Mrs. Keever	Episode: "Ed Brown's Car Wash"
1980	The Love Boat	The Harridan	Episode: "Celebration/Captain Papa/Honeymoon Pressure"
1974-1981	Happy Days	Mama Delvecchio / Mrs. Stewart	3 episodes
1981	Eight Is Enough	Horace's Wife	Episode: "Vows"
1981	Checking In	Mrs. Sabitino	Episode: "Whose Side Are You On?"
1981	Stockers		TV movie
1981	Callie & Son	Mrs. Watkins	TV movie
1981	Dark Night of the Scarecrow	Mrs. Bunch	TV movie
1981	Flamingo Road		Episode: "The Stranger"
1980-1982	WKRP in Cincinnati	Mrs. Hutchinson / Mrs. Nedelman	2 episodes
1982	Hart to Hart	Bujie	Episode: "The Harts Strike Out"
1982	Nine to Five	Bag Lady	Episode: "Temporarily Disconnected"
1984	Knight Rider	Nurse Gilmore	Episode: "Lost Knight"
1985	Crazy Like a Fox	Mrs. De Curtis	Episode: "Eye in the Sky"
1985	Misfits of Science	Sailor Sam	Episode: "Sonar... and Yet So Far"
1985	227	Woman	Episode: "Football Widow"
1986	Riptide	Nurse Carla Winters	Episode: "A Matter of Policy"
1982-1986	Simon & Simon	Woman customer at Quickie Mart / Barney - seller of maps to stars' home"	2 episodes
1987	Murder, She Wrote	Henrietta	Episode: "No Laughing Murder"
1988	My Sister Sam	Lily	Episode: "Walk a While in My Shoes"
