= Camp Runamuck =

American sitcom (1965–66)

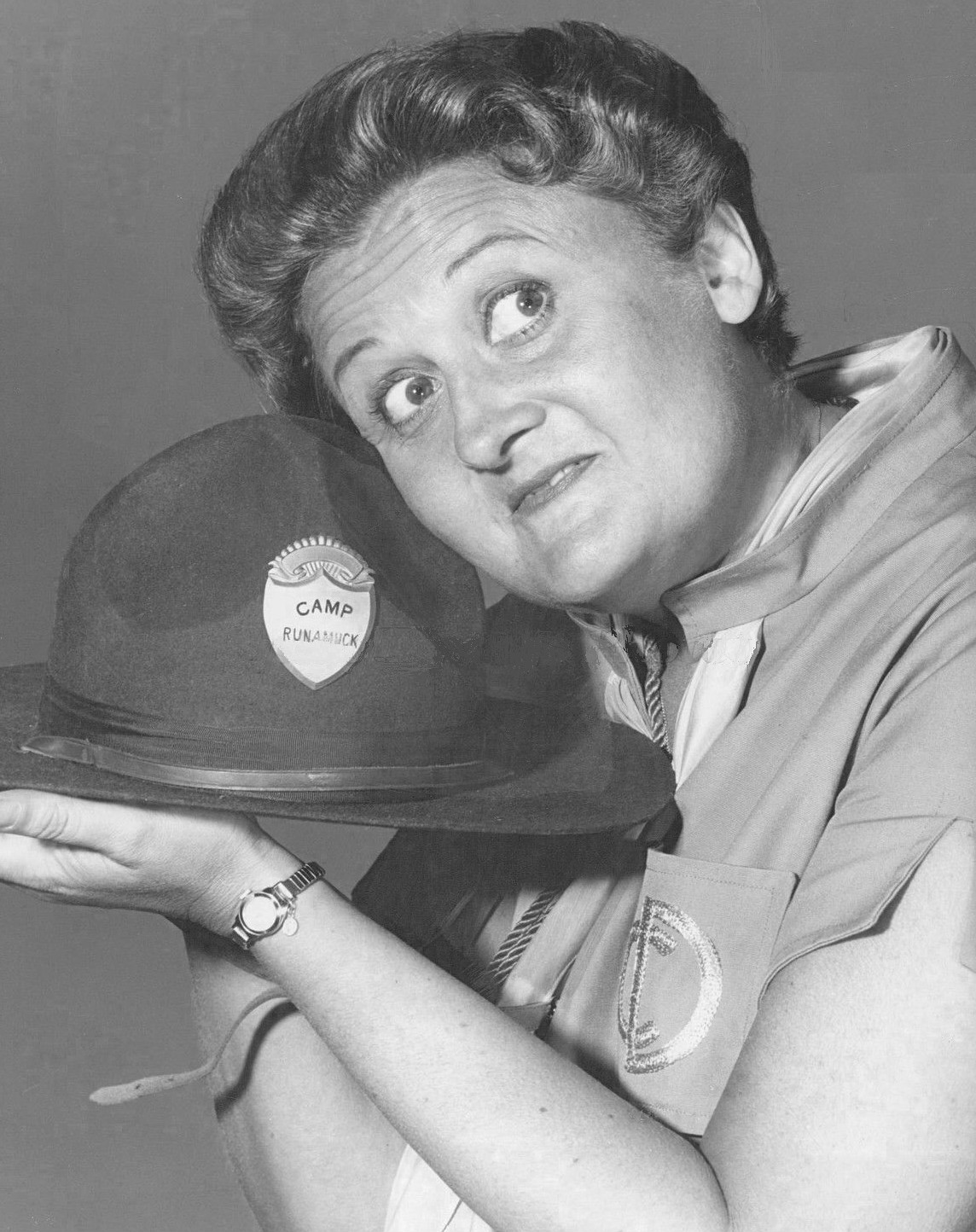
- Alice Nunn as Mahalia May Gruenecker
- Genre: Sitcom
- Created by: David Swift
- Written by: William Freedman; Ben Gershman; Sidney A. Mandel; Ann Marcus; Bob Rodgers; David Swift
- Directed by: Charles Barton; Bruce Bilson; Howard Duff; Hal March; R. Robert Rosenbaum; David Swift
- Starring: Arch Johnson; David Ketchum; Dave Madden; Alice Nunn
- Theme music composer: Frank DeVol; Jack Keller; Howard Greenfield
- Opening theme: "Camp Runamuck Theme"
- Composer: Edward J. Forsyth
- Country of origin: United States
- Original language: English
- No. of seasons: 1
- No. of episodes: 26

Production
- Executive producer: David Swift
- Producer: Billy Friedberg
- Editor: Ralph James Hall
- Running time: 22–24 minutes
- Production companies: Runamuck Productions Inc. Screen Gems

Original release
- Network: NBC
- Release: September 17, 1965 – April 15, 1966

Camp Runamuck is an American sitcom that aired on NBC during the 1965–66 television season. The series was created and executive produced by David Swift and aired for 26 episodes.

== Synopsis ==
The series related the wacky goings-on at the titular boys' summer camp, and at Camp Divine, its girls' counterpart across the lake. Runamuck was run by Commander Wivenhoe (Arch Johnson), a man who could not stand kids, and senior counselor Spiffy (David Ketchum), his assistant of sorts.

Helping them out were counselor Pruett (Dave Madden), Doc Joslyn, and camp cook Malden (Mike Wagner). Eulalia Divine (Hermione Baddeley) was the owner of the girls' camp, which was run by chief counselor Mahalia May Gruenecker (Alice Nunn). Nina Wayne (younger sister of Carol) played Camp Divine's curvaceous counsellor Caprice Yeudleman. The competitiveness between the two camps and the incidents and accidents that would normally occur at such summer camps - missing kids, people falling into the lake, food poisoning, and so on - formed the basis of most of the show's plots.

The series was scheduled opposite CBS's The Wild Wild West (which premiered that same day) and ABC's The Flintstones and struggled in the ratings. The series was canceled after 26 episodes, with the last new episode airing on April 15, 1966. Reruns aired on NBC until September 2, 1966.

== Production notes ==
Composer and bandleader Frank DeVol (who also wrote the series' theme song) played the part of Doc Joslyn in the pilot episode, but illness forced him to quit the role, and he was replaced by Leonard Stone for the actual series. DeVol's original theme song was performed by Bobby Darin. Hugo Montenegro provided a new theme song and score to the episodes.

In April 1966, Dell Comics issued a Camp Runamuck comic book.

Some of the characters on that show were based on some of the names described in the song "Hello Muddah, Hello Fadduh" by Allan Sherman, including Joe Spivey.

== Cast ==
- Arch Johnson as Commander Wivenhoe
- David Ketchum as Senior Counsellor Spiffy
- Dave Madden as Counselor Pruett
- Frank De Vol as Doc Joslyn (1)
- Leonard Stone as Doc Joslyn (2)
- Mike Wagner as Camp Cook Malden
- Hermione Baddeley as Eulalia Divine
- Alice Nunn as Mahalia May Gruenecker
- Nina Wayne as Caprice Yeudleman
- George Dunn as The Sheriff

== Episodes ==
Episode #	Episode title	Directed by	Written by	Original airdate
1-1	"Who Stole My Bathtub?"	David Swift	David Swift	September 17, 1965
1-2	"Rabbits of the World Unite"	David Swift	David Swift	September 24, 1965
1-3	"Fraternize"	R. Robert Rosenbaum	David Swift	October 1, 1965
1-4	"I'm in Luv with Your Beautiful Limpid Eyes, But I Can't Marry You Because You're a Cow"	David Swift	David Swift	October 8, 1965
1-5	"Say, You're A Bleeder Aren't You?' Tom Asks Cuttingly"	Hal March	David Swift	October 15, 1965
1-6	"They're Not Making Hurricanes Like They Used To"	Howard Duff	David Swift	October 22, 1965
1-7	"Turtle???"	R. Robert Rosenbaum	Sidney A. Mandel & Bob Rodgers	October 29, 1965
1-8	"Slaughter"	David Swift	David Swift	November 5, 1965
1-9	"Today is Parent's Day"	David Swift	David Swift	November 12, 1965
1-10	"Masquerade"	Howard Duff	Sidney A. Mandel & Bob Rodgers	November 19, 1965
1-11	"Spiffy Quits - Part 1"	David Swift	Sidney A. Mandel & Bob Rodgers	November 26, 1965
1-12	"Spiffy Quits - Part II"	David Swift	David Swift	December 3, 1965
1-13	"Soapsuds"	R. Robert Rosenbaum	Sidney A. Mandel & Bob Rodgers	December 10, 1965
1-14	"The New Swimming Pool"	R. Robert Rosenbaum	Sidney A. Mandel & Bob Rodgers	December 24, 1965
1-15	"Wivenhoe's New Car"	Howard Duff	Sidney A. Mandel & Bob Rodgers	December 31, 1965
1-16	"Tomboy"	Hal March	Ann Marcus & David Swift	January 7, 1966
1-17	"Look Out, Here Comes Arnie"	Howard Duff	Sidney A. Mandel & Bob Rodgers	January 14, 1966
1-18	"Diet"	R. Robert Rosenbaum	Sidney A. Mandel & Bob Rodgers	January 28, 1966
1-19	"Air Conditioner"	R. Robert Rosenbaum	Sidney A. Mandel & Bob Rodgers	February 4, 1966
1-20	"Food Poisoning"	Howard Duff	Sidney A. Mandel & Bob Rodgers	February 11, 1966
1-21	"Building"	R. Robert Rosenbaum	David Swift	February 25, 1966
1-22	"Termites"	Charles Barton	Sidney A. Mandel & Bob Rodgers	March 4, 1966
1-23	"Peace"	Howard Duff	Sidney A. Mandel & Bob Rodgers	March 18, 1966
1-24	"Malden Falls in Love"	David Butler	Bill Freedman & Ben Gershman	March 25, 1966
1-25	"Senior Citizens"	Howard Duff	Sidney A. Mandel & Bob Rodgers	April 8, 1966
1-26	"Commander for a Day"	Bruce Bilson	Bill Freedman & Ben Gershman	April 15, 1966

== Syndication ==
The series aired in the UK by the BBC on Saturday mornings in 1975, 10 years after it aired in the United States. (Although this was the first network UK screening of Camp Runamuck, the series was aired by some ITV regional stations in 1969). In the United States, it briefly ran on Nickelodeon and Comedy Central.

About half of the series became available on the streaming service Crackle in 2021.
