= Remote Control (1988 film) =

1988 film by Jeff Lieberman

- Promotional poster
- Directed by: Jeff Lieberman
- Written by: Jeff Lieberman
- Produced by: Scott Rosenfelt; Mark Levinson
- Starring: Kevin Dillon; Deborah Goodrich; Christopher Wynne; Frank Beddor; Jennifer Tilly; Bert Remsen
- Cinematography: Tim Suhrstedt
- Edited by: Scott Wallace
- Music by: Peter Bernstein
- Production company: Vista Organization
- Distributed by: Vista Organization
- Release date: April 7, 1988
- Running time: 85 minutes
- Country: United States
- Language: English
- Budget: $3 million

Remote Control is a 1988 American science fiction film written and directed by Jeff Lieberman, and starring Kevin Dillon as a Los Angeles video rental clerk who discovers that his store is circulating a VHS tape of a 1950s sci-fi film programmed by aliens to brainwash viewers, causing them to commit murders.

Lieberman's screenplay combines elements of thriller, horror, action films and science fiction with satirical humor. Lieberman did not direct another theatrical feature film for sixteen years, until Satan's Little Helper in 2004.

== Plot ==
A yuppie husband and wife, Alan and Juliette, watch a fifties sci-fi tape, Remote Control. The film also starts with a couple, Milo and Eva, watching a tape called Remote Control on a futuristic viewing screen. The tape hypnotizes Eva into killing Milo with her futuristic sewing device. The same thing happens to Juliette, and she kills her husband with a whip while dressed in a fifties sci-fi style dominatrix outfit.

Video store clerk Cosmo works at Village Video, a store converted from an old movie theater. He becomes smitten with a female customer, Belinda Watson, who is looking for foreign romance films to provide respite from Victor, her abusive boyfriend.

Cosmo helps his boss Georgie set up a display for Remote Control, with a mirror and rotating dish which sends out a repeating signal. Victor fights with female customer Allegra over the last tape of Remote Control. As she checks out, Victor notices her address on the computer. He later follows her home.

Cosmo convinces Georgie to deliver a tape Allegra had been requesting to her house personally, wanting the two of them to get together. They see her with Victor, not knowing he is strangling her. A neighbor sees them, and the two are forced to flee. Victor later kills Allegra’s parents when they return home.

The next day, two police officers, Artie and Pete, arrive at the video store, having gotten a description of Cosmo and Georgie from Allegra’s neighbor, as well as Georgie’s library card, which he accidentally dropped fleeing the scene. Since they were old friends, Cosmo convinces Artie to return to Allegra’s home and watch the tape, thinking it contains the footage of Victor attacking Allegra. It instead brainwashes Artie, who chases Cosmo around the house trying to shoot him. When his partner investigates, Artie shoots him, then is shot in self-defense by Cosmo.

Cosmo and Georgie flee with the tape, Cosmo driving to the gym where Victor and Belinda are taking an aerobics class. Cosmo coerces Belinda to go back to the store with them. To convince her of the threat her boyfriend poses, Cosmo and Georgie show her the tape, eventually ejecting the tape when she becomes homicidal.

Convinced that the film sends out a brainwashing signal, Cosmo destroys the display. The police are still looking for them, so they sneak out the back of the store. Needing another vehicle, Cosmo pretends to be a valet parking attendant to steal a couple’s car. The three drive to another video store, where Cosmo is attacked by the brainwashed manager. Cosmo manages to kill him and destroy the tapes.

The trio travel to the headquarters of Polaris Video, the company that produces Remote Control. Pretending to be new video creators, they gain access. Inside, they discover a row of monitors staffed by aliens, who all appear as Japanese men. They run up to the control room, and confront the aliens. The video company president reveals he knows of the aliens’ plan, having been commanded by the aliens’ control brain on their distant planet. He also was expecting their arrival, as part of the Remote Control film shows similar events.

Cosmo pleads with the owner to break free of the aliens’ mind control. He attempts to do so, getting shot by the aliens’ leader in the process. Cosmo kills the alien in response, and the remorseful president tells them to destroy all the tapes. Guards arrive, fatally wounding Georgie, though Cosmo manages to kill two of them. As the heroes flee to the storage warehouse, another alien takes over as the controller. Georgie dies of his injuries, and Cosmo uses a forklift to puncture fuel tanks and destroy the warehouse (while similar events play out in the fifties film).

Cosmo and Belinda escape in a delivery truck as the rest of the facility explodes, seemingly killing the alien leader. Cosmo directs Belinda towards the last remaining video store with copies of Remote Control. They steal the tape from brainwashed teenagers and destroy it, but learn that the other two were checked out: One is at a local nightclub, and the other was checked out by Cosmo’s sister for his nephew to watch.

Cosmo drops Belinda off at the nightclub, then races towards his sister’s house. He manages to steal the tape before his nephew can be brainwashed, fleeing from the police who were staking out the house. Back at the nightclub, Belinda is accosted by the teenagers from the video store, who have played the tape on the nightclub’s large television screen. The brainwashed nightclub patrons start a fight, which leads to a fire being set, killing several patrons (as well as destroying the VHS tapes). As firefighters arrive, Victor convinces Belinda he is innocent, then takes her home.

Cosmo arrives at the nightclub, and, seeing Belinda isn’t there, drives to her home. She lets him in and gives him Victor’s copy of Remote Control. Cosmo looks around for a hammer to destroy the tape, wandering into the garage and seeing Victor’s sports car parked inside. He runs upstairs, where the film is playing on the TV. Realizing the tape Belinda gave him was a decoy, he confronts her. Victor emerges, revealing he brainwashed her.

Cosmo fights with Victor, Belinda joining in. Cosmo manages to kill Victor and turn off the house’s power. The VHS player turns itself back on, the film brainwashing Cosmo when he investigates. As Cosmo tries to kill Belinda, he manages to fight off the aliens’ control and throw the VHS player at the TV set, smashing it. Cosmo destroys all the remaining copies of Remote Control. In the morning, in the rubble of the facility, the alien leader emerges, taking the last Remote Control tape from the heroes’ car, which they had forgotten about.

== Release ==
In 1988, the film was passed uncut with a 15 rating by the BBFC.

== Reception ==
TV Guide gave the film one out of five stars, saying: "It doesn't know whether it wants to be a spoof or a thriller; because of its indecision, it fails on both levels."

Allmovie reviewed the film favorably, writing, "This clever little b-movie is another example of why Jeff Lieberman is a cult favorite in certain genre-movie circles. His script puts a distinctly 1980's twist on the old alien-invasion premise, cleverly managing to make home video seem menacing as he builds up a solid combination of action, sci-fi and horror/thriller elements. Lieberman's direction is unflashy but effective, building tension throughout and frequently offsetting the dark elements of the script with satirical humor."

In Creature Feature, John Stanley gave the movie two out of five stars, but noted its commentary on video and what it does to people's minds.

== Home release ==
Sometime after its theatrical release, International Video Entertainment released the film on VHS. A second release occurred in 1990 under the Avid Home Entertainment label.

In 2013, a 25th Anniversary edition was released on Blu-ray and DVD by director Jeff Lieberman.
