= Back Roads (1981 film) =

1981 film by Martin Ritt

- Theatrical release poster
- Directed by: Martin Ritt
- Written by: Gary DeVore
- Produced by: Ronald Shedlo
- Starring: Sally Field; Tommy Lee Jones
- Cinematography: John A. Alonzo
- Edited by: Sidney Levin
- Music by: Henry Mancini
- Production company: CBS Theatrical Films
- Distributed by: Warner Bros. Pictures
- Release date: March 13, 1981
- Running time: 90 minutes
- Country: United States
- Language: English
- Budget: $7-8 million
- Box office: $11.8 million

Back Roads is a 1981 American romantic comedy film starring Sally Field and Tommy Lee Jones. It is directed by Martin Ritt. It got middling reviews and grossed $11 million at the box office. This was the first film produced by CBS Theatrical Films (a short lived film production branch of CBS). The film was distributed by Warner Bros. Pictures.

== Plot ==
Amy Post is a $20-a-trick hooker in Mobile, Alabama. One night she entertains Elmore Pratt, an ex-boxer who has just been fired from his job at a car wash. He cannot pay her for services rendered.

Pratt punches a plainclothes police officer. He and Amy drive away together, intending to head for California, bickering along the way.

== Production ==
Field and Jones disliked one another intensely during filming. Ritt said that he regretted not being able to make this film work, blaming its failure on both the script and the stars' inability to get along.

== Reception ==
In his March 13, 1981 review, The New York Times critic Vincent Canby wrote that there "seems to be a real rapport" between the two actors. Canby described the film as "extremely appealing and occasionally gutsy and very funny." Other reviewers were less kind. Roger Ebert of the Chicago Sun-Times considered the movie formulaic and "heavily laden with schtick", giving the film two stars on a scale of four, although he did comment that Field "gives a performance that cannot be faulted." He considered Back Roads a "less-than-successful" effort by director Ritt.

== Cast ==
- Sally Field as Amy Post
- Tommy Lee Jones as Elmore Pratt
- David Keith as Mason
- Michael V. Gazzo as Tazio
- Barbara Babcock as Ricky's mom
- Miriam Colon as Angel
- Alex Colon as Enrique
- M. Emmet Walsh as Arthur
- Dan Shor as Spivey
- Lee de Broux as "Red"
- Ralph Seymour as Gosler
- Royce D. Applegate as The Father
- John Dennis Johnston as Gilly
- John M. Jackson as Merle
- Woody Watson as Larry
- Bruce M. Fischer as Ezra
- Don "Red" Barry as Pete
- Brian Frishman as Bleitz
- Diane Sommerfield as Liz
- Henry Slate as Grover
- Matthew Campion as Stromberg
- Tony Ganios as Bartini
- Arthur Pugh as Taper
- Gerry Okuneff as Oren
- Louie Nicholas as Burt
- Cherie Brantley as Ellen
- James Michael Bailey as Billy
- Fred Baldwin as Gordy
- Billy Holliday as Isaac
- Barbara Thompson as Florence ("Flo")
- Buddy Thompson as Peter
- Phil Gordon as Caleb
- Richard Charles Boyle as Ernest
- Sherrie Whitman as Maralyn
- Lupita Cornejo as Cory
- Bob Hannah as Vernon
- Eliott Keener as Willis
- David Dahlgren as Mel
- John Wilmot as Ed
- Jack E. Shadix as Orville
- Joe Ford as Max
- Duke Alexander as Charlie
- Nell Carter as Waitress
- Billy Jayne as Boy Thief
- Eric Laneuville as Pinball Wizard
- Mike Barton as Police Officer
- Lee McLaughlin as Deputy
- Bennett Wayne Dean Sr. As Street Drug Dealer (uncredited)
