= 'Til Death Do Us Part (American TV series) =

- Also known as: "Love You to Death"
- Genre: Murder mystery
- Created by: Jeff Lieberman
- Written by: Nicole Snyder; Eric Charmelo; James Ireland; Scott Nimerfro; Mary Hanes
- Directed by: J. Miles Dale; Stephan Fanfara
- Creative director: Jerry Nicolaou
- Starring: John Waters
- Narrated by: John Waters
- Composer: Erika Lieberman
- Country of origin: Canada
- Original language: English
- No. of seasons: 1
- No. of episodes: 13

Production
- Executive producers: Ken Hanes; Ira Pincus; Jeff Lieberman; John Morayniss
- Producers: Kevin Lafferty; Bernard Bourret
- Production location: Various Places
- Cinematography: Yuri Yakubiw
- Editors: Film; Ben Wilkinson; Michael Todd; Sound; Kevin Howard; Rob Hegedus; Music; Rob Hegedus
- Running time: 22 minutes (excluding commercials)
- Production company: Blueprint Entertainment

Original release
- Network: Court TV
- Release: March 19 – June 4, 2007

'Til Death Do Us Part (also known in Canada and Australia as Love You to Death) is a murder mystery television series on Court TV. The series first aired on March 19, 2007, and went by the motto "To Love, Honor, and Perish". Created by Jeff Lieberman, it was the first scripted series made for Court TV.

== Format ==
The series was narrated and hosted by cult film director John Waters, who played "The Groom Reaper". The scripted program re-enacted real-life courtroom stories involving marriages and families whose seemingly picture-perfect lives end in a murderous way. The series had a Tales from the Crypt-like setting, with each episode lasting 30 minutes. At each end of an episode, John Waters would say "I have another wedding to go to, but I hope it won't be yours."

After 15 minutes of the show, Court TV would allow viewers to text message a guess on who would be the killer. Each re-enactment is directed to be intentionally over-the-top, complete with overacting and cringe-worthy dialogue.

Court TV's commercials promoting the show parody the DeBeers diamond television ads, through the use of silhouettes and dramatic background music.

== Plot ==
The show is about how two people get married and how one spouse ends up involved in the murder of the other spouse. The viewers were able to guess who murdered whom. The murderer was announced at the end of each show.

== Cast ==
Character	Actor/Actress	Episodes
The Groom Reaper	John Waters	(14 episodes, 2006–2007)

== Episodes ==
Ep #	Airdate	Title	Director
00	2006	"Pilot"	Jeff Lieberman
01	March 19, 2007	"Funeral Parlor Murder"	Larry A. McLean
02	April 16, 2007	"Storage Unit Murder"	Ken Hanes
03	March 19, 2007	"The Airplane Murder"	J. Miles Dale
04	April 2, 2007	"Car Keys Murder"	J. Miles Dale
05	March 26, 2007	"Time Capsule Murder"	Don McCutcheon
06	2007	"The Strip Club Murder"	Don McCutcheon
07	2007	"The Clown Case"	James Ireland
08	April 23, 2007	"The Pond Scum Murder"	Stephan Fanfara
09	2007	"The Bog Murder"	Larry A. McLean
10	2007	"Murder Mystery Weekend"	Larry A. McLean
11	May 7, 2007	"The In-Law Murders"	David Warry-Smith
12	2007	"The Beauty Queen Murder"	Don McCutcheon
13	May 14, 2007	"A Christmas Murder"	Stephan Fanfara

== Production ==
'Til Death Do Us Part is filmed in Canada as a co-production between Court TV and Canada's Global Television Network. The show debuted in Canada on Global on March 21, 2007, under the title Love You To Death.
