= Delusion (1981 film) =

1980 film by Alan Beattie

- Theatrical release poster
- Directed by: Alan Beattie
- Written by: Alan Beattie; Jack Viertel
- Produced by: John Cofrin; Alan Beattie; Peter Shanaberg
- Starring: Patricia Pearcy; Joseph Cotten; John Dukakis; David Hayward; Alice Nunn
- Cinematography: Stephen Posey
- Edited by: Robert Leighton
- Music by: Don Peake
- Distributed by: New American Films; International Picture Show
- Release date: January 16, 1981 (U.S.)
- Running time: 82 minutes
- Country: United States
- Language: English

Delusion (also known as The House Where Death Lives) is a 1981 American psychological slasher film directed by Alan Beattie, and starring Patricia Pearcy, Joseph Cotten, David Hayward, and John Dukakis.

The film's poster art is based on Charles Allan Gilbert's 1892 illustration All Is Vanity.

== Plot ==
Nurse Meredith Stone recounts, in a letter to her father, her mother's recent death, and details a job she has taken at a Fairlawn estate caring for the wealthy, elderly Ivar Langrock. There, she is greeted by his butler, Phillip, and Jeffrey Fraser, Ivar's attorney. She finds herself almost immediately drawn to a locked room on the second floor of the house. She discovers that Wilfred, Ivar's mentally-challenged son, lives in the room. Meredith develops a friendship with Ivar, even confessing to him that her mother had been institutionalized and that her father had raped her mother.

Shortly after Meredith begins working at Fairlawn, Langrock's adult grandson Gabriel, who spent his life on a commune in Arizona, comes to stay after the accidental death of his parents. After his arrival, a series of deaths begin to occur; Meredith and Ivar discover his dog hanging from a tree in the garden. Wilfred also dies in what appears to be a suicide when he is found having jumped out the window of his room. Gabriel makes sexual advances toward Meredith, who finds herself increasingly uncomfortable around him.

Phillip is murdered in the wine cellar, having been crushed under a fallen wine rack and clobbered with a table leg; the police, however, conclude his death an accident, though Jeffrey accuses Gabriel of his murder. Later in the evening, the house gardener, Alex, is confronted at the Fairlawn estate by the detective in a garage, who tells him the coroner has deemed Philip's death a murder. After he leaves, Alex hears a commotion behind him, and upon returning, he finds the detective dead. The unseen killer also attacks Alex, beating him to death.

Meredith, while searching the house, discovers a bloodied table leg, and calls Jeffrey, panicked. He tells her he is on his way to the house. Just as Jeffrey arrives, she discovers Gabriel's body stuffed in a closet. Jeffrey confronts her, and tells her that he has just returned from the hospital where Meredith claimed her mother was kept, and reveals that her mother died during Meredith's birth; he also accuses her of the murders, telling her she had been institutionalized for murdering her father, who had molested her. She then attacks Jeffrey with the table leg, and storms downstairs to kill Ivar. However, Ivar manages to knock her unconscious with a cane.

The film close as Meredith narrates her letter to her father, saying that maybe she will be able to return to Fairlawn one day to take care of Ivar.

== Cast ==
- Patricia Pearcy as Meredith Stone
- David Hayward as Jeffrey Fraser
- John Dukakis as Gabriel Langrock
- Leon Charles as Phillip
- Alice Nunn as Duffy
- Patrick Pankhurst as Wilfred Langrock
- Joseph Cotten as Ivar Langrock
- Louis Basile as Taxi Driver
- Abraham Alvarez as Alex
- Simone Griffeth as Pamela Barton
- James Purcell as Detective
- Shelby Leverington as additional dialogue (voice)
- George P. Wilbur as Stunts

== Production ==
Delusion was filmed on location in 1980 in Altadena, California.

== Release ==
The film was given a regional release in the southern United States in early 1981, opening on January 16, 1981 in Memphis, Tennessee, Fort Worth, Texas, and Alexandria, Louisiana.

=== Critical response ===
Arthur Cabasos of the Abilene Reporter-News was critical of the film, deeming it "one of those boring horror movies where the creators couldn't even come up with some ghoulish method for offing characters other than a sturdy coffee table leg to the temple... The only positive note to this movie is the psychiatric twist to the ending when the identity of the murderer is revealed." Candice Russell of the Fort Lauderdale News was ultimately disappointed by the film despite praising its character development, feeling that its twist ending was derivative.

Retro Slashers.net reviewer Thomas Ellsion gave the film a positive review, stating that "Delusion is a subdued slasher that relies more on the skills of a veteran cast, a deliberate pace, and a twist ending" and it is "worth seeking out for fans of slashers with a heavy dose of whodunit mystery."

AllMovie, however, gave the film a negative review, stating that "slow-moving and low-key."

=== Home media ===
In 1984, the film was released on VHS in the USA by Embassy Pictures under the title Delusion and that same year was released in the UK by Sultan Video under the title The House Where Death Lives. The film was not released on home video for forty-years until Vinegar Syndrome released it on Blu-ray in 2024.

== Sources ==
- Stanley, John (2000). Creature Features: The Science Fiction, Fantasy, and Horror Movie Guide. Berkly Boulevard Books. ISBN 978-0-425-17517-0.
