= Dave Madden =

Canadian-born American actor (1931–2014)

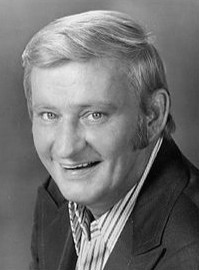
- Madden in 1970
- Born: David Joseph Madden; December 17, 1931; Sarnia, Ontario, Canada
- Died: January 16, 2014 (aged 82); Jacksonville, Florida, U.S.
- Occupation: Actor
- Years active: 1962–2008
- Spouses: Nena Arnold (m. 1975; div. 1985); Sandra Martin (m. 1998)
- Children: 2

David Joseph Madden (December 17, 1931 – January 16, 2014) was a Canadian-born American actor. His most famous role came on the 1970s sitcom The Partridge Family, in which he played the group's manager, Reuben Kincaid, opposite Shirley Jones's character. Madden later had a recurring role as diner customer Earl Hicks on the mid-1970s to mid-1980s sitcom Alice.

== Early life ==
Madden was born in Sarnia, Ontario, Canada, to Verna (née Burleigh) and Roger Madden. He had three older siblings: Sister Mary Roger (1920–2023), a practicing nun at Saint Mary-of-the-Woods in Indiana; Richard (1922–2001); and Jack (1926–1947). He spent his early childhood in Port Huron, Michigan, across the St. Clair River from Sarnia.

In 1939, he was sent to live with his aunt and uncle, Bess and Frank Hoff, in Terre Haute, Indiana, after his father's death and his mother's job keeping her on the road.

At age 13, a serious bicycle accident left him immobilized. Madden spent months recuperating, a time during which he took an interest in magic. He later worked magic into his comedy act, which he performed around Terre Haute.

He graduated in 1950 from Otter Creek High School, where he served as joke editor of the school paper, writing his own material. Madden spent one semester at Indiana State Teachers College, and in 1951 dropped out to enlist in the United States Air Force. Assigned to Special Services, he was sent to Tripoli, Libya, where he was a hit as an entertainer in camp shows and native theatre, even performing before Idris of Libya, the ruler at the time.

After the Air Force, Madden attended the University of Miami, where he graduated with a degree in communications in 1959.

== Career ==
After two unsuccessful years on the Southern nightclub circuit, Madden travelled to Los Angeles, where a successful opening night at a Beverly Hills nightclub led to a 10-week retention, and a recommendation by patron Frank Sinatra to Ed Sullivan, who signed Madden for three nights on The Ed Sullivan Show. These appearances led to his first real acting engagement, a spot on Camp Runamuck, in 1965.

Madden first gained national notice as a milk-drinking, confetti-throwing sad sack on Rowan & Martin's Laugh-In from 1968 to 1969. However, he became better known worldwide for his role as Reuben Kincaid, the harried manager/agent for The Partridge Family (1970–1974). Partridge co-star Danny Bonaduce, whom Madden took into his home during Bonaduce's family's domestic strife, has said that he owes a lot to Madden. In 1976, he appeared in Eat My Dust!, the first movie developed by Ron Howard.

Madden also made guest appearances on other television series, such as Bewitched, Happy Days, The Love Boat, Barney Miller (1978, episode: "Eviction", parts 1 and 2) and Fantasy Island. He had a recurring role on Alice as Tommy's basketball coach Earl Hicks, a regular at Mel's Diner.

Madden began voicing several characters on Focus on the Family's children's radio drama Adventures in Odyssey in the late 1980s. In 1990, he received his own regular character in the curmudgeonly window-washer Bernard Walton, a character he continued to play until 2008.

In 1992, he reprised his role of Mr. Kincaid for a sketch on an episode of The Ben Stiller Show. Two years later, he appeared with Bonaduce in an episode of Married... with Children.

In 1995, Madden appeared on the sitcom Boy Meets World in the episode "Rave On". His last guest appearance was on Sabrina the Teenage Witch, where he played Dr. Egglehoffer along with other former Laugh-In cast members.

Madden did voice-over work for numerous television and radio commercials, including the Corlick Sister advertisements for Denny's from 1990 to 1993. Madden also narrated the opening title sequence for the FOX sitcom Herman's Head during the show's first two seasons.

== Personal life ==
Madden married Nena Arnold in 1975. They had two children – an adopted daughter, Selena; and a son, Peter Michael – before divorcing in 1985.

Madden married his former college sweetheart Sandy (Dempsey) Madden on May 28, 1998.

While starring in The Partridge Family, Madden took an interest in photography. He would bring his camera onto the set to photograph the cast, crew, and guest stars. This became a lifelong hobby for him.

A long-time smoker, Madden quit after The Partridge Family episode "Each Dawn I Diet" (in which Danny and Reuben make a bet that Reuben can abstain from smoking longer than Danny can from eating "junk" food).

According to Madden, he did not get along with Shirley Jones's husband Marty Ingels; Madden and Jones had a limited relationship as a result.

Madden befriended many fellow actors over his career, including Jonathan Winters, Alan Young, Pat Morita, Henry Gibson, Dan Rowan, Richard Gautier, Arte Johnson, James Karen, and Gary Owens, as well as all of his Partridge Family co-stars and the show's creator Bernard Slade. While in retirement, he wrote his autobiography Reuben on Wry: The Memoirs of Dave Madden.

== Death ==
Madden died on January 16, 2014, in Jacksonville, Florida, where he was receiving hospice care, from complications of myelodysplastic syndrome. He was 82.

== Filmography ==
=== Film ===
Year	Title	Role	Notes
1973	Charlotte's Web	Ram (voice)	Feature film
1976	Eat My Dust!	Big Bubba Jones	Feature film

=== Television ===
Year	Title	Role	Notes
1965–1966	Camp Runamuck	Counselor Pruett	18 episodes
1967	Bewitched	Joe	Episode - "Super Car"
1967	Accidental Family	Tom	Episode - "Everywhere a Chick Chick"
1968–1969	Rowan & Martin's Laugh-In	Regular Performer	26 episodes
1969	Bewitched	Fred	Episode - "Samantha's Shopping Spree"
1970–1974	The Partridge Family	Reuben Kincaid	96 episodes
1972–1973	Love, American Style	Howard / Walter Lerner	Segments - "Love and the Topless Policy" and "Love and the Singing Suitor"
1974	The Girl Who Came Gift-Wrapped	Stanley	ABC Movie of the Week
1974	Happy Days	Jack Whippett	Episode - "Big Money"
1976	ABC Afterschool Special	Coach Puckett	Episode - "Mighty Moose and the Quarterback Kid"
1977	Starsky & Hutch	Phil Hill	Episode - "Starsky and Hutch on Playboy Island"
1977	Mulligan's Stew	Elliot	Episode - "A New Grandpa"
1978	This Is the Life	Roman Centurion	Episode - "The Stableboy's Christmas"
1978	Barney Miller	Clayton Walsh	Episodes - "Eviction" (Parts 1 & 2)
1978–1985	Alice	Earl Hicks	35 episodes
1978	The Love Boat	Wes Larsen	Episode - "El Kid/The Last Hundred Bucks/Isosceles Triangle"
1978	Flying High	Reception Clerk	Episode - "Fun Flight"
1979	Fantasy Island	George Crane	Episode - "The Red Baron/Young at Heart"
1979	Skinflint: A Country Christmas Carol	Stanley Gershen	TV movie
1980	When the Whistle Blows	Roscoe Baker	Episode - "Miss Hard Hat USA"
1980	More Wild Wild West	German Ambassador	TV movie
1981	The Misadventures of Sheriff Lobo	Sidney	Episode - "The Girls with the Stolen Bodies"
1982	Richie Rich	Additional voices	Episode - "Dollar's Exercise/Richie's Cube/The Maltese Monkey/Everybody's Doing It"
1985	CBS Storybreak	Arnold's Dad	Episode - "Arnold of the Ducks"
1986	The New Leave It to Beaver	Mr. Johnson	Episode - "How's Your Bird?"
1986	Life with Lucy	Stanley Bigelow	Episode - "Lucy Make Curtis Byte the Dust"
1989	Marvin: Baby of the Year	Jeff Miller (voice)	TV special
1992	The Ben Stiller Show	Mr. Kinkaid	Episode - "Pilot"
1994	Married... with Children	Manager	Episode - "How Green Was My Apple"
1995	Boy Meets World	The Manager	Episode - "Rave On"
1998	Sabrina the Teenage Witch	Dr. Hans Egglehoffer	Episode - "Good Will Haunting"
1999	E! True Hollywood Story	self-narrator	Episode: "The Partridge Family"

=== Radio ===
Year	Title	Role	Notes
1988–2008	Adventures in Odyssey	Various Characters/Bernard Walton	97 episodes

=== Video games ===
Year	Title	Role	Notes
1997	The Curse of Monkey Island	Dinghy Dog	Voice only
