= Nina Wayne =

American former dancer, actress (born 1943)

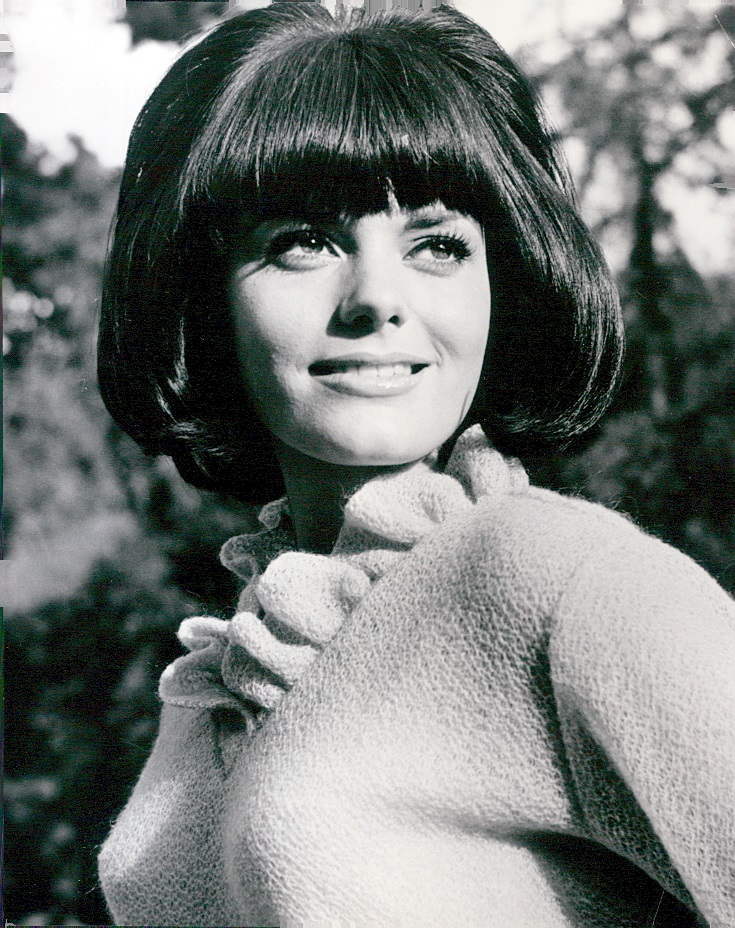
- Wayne in Camp Runamuck (1965)
- Born: September 13, 1943 (age 83); Chicago, Illinois, U.S.
- Occupation: Actress
- Years active: 1965–1973
- Spouses: David Wheeler (m. 1968; div. 1972) John Drew Barrymore (m. 1985; div. 1994)
- Children: 3
- Relatives: Carol Wayne (sister)

Nina Wayne (born September 13, 1943) is a retired American actress.

== Early years ==
Wayne was born on September 13, 1943, in Chicago. She is the younger sister of actress Carol Wayne. Wayne began taking ballet lessons when she was three years old, and at age 6 she began taking classes in skating.

== Career ==
When Wayne was 15, she and her sister Carol began performing for the Ice Capades as The Wayne Sisters. That act ended when her sister fell. Wayne stayed with the show for a year as a solo performer, after which she left and became a dancer.

She danced in Las Vegas for three years, then moved to New York, where she danced at the Latin Quarter nightclub. She was a dancer as part of Van Johnson's act there. During that same period she had a daytime job as a model.

She first appeared on The Tonight Show in October 1964. She started working in television in 1965, with a recurring role as camp counselor Caprice Yeudleman in the single season of Camp Runamuck, and appeared in one episode of Bewitched.

Wayne's first movie was Dead Heat on a Merry-Go-Round (1966). Her breakthrough came when she starred opposite Jack Lemmon and Peter Falk in the 1967 romantic comedy Luv. She followed with The Comic (1969) with Dick Van Dyke and Mickey Rooney. Her last appearance was in the 1973 TV supernatural drama The Night Strangler.

== Personal life ==
Wayne had one child, daughter Brahama Jessica, with actor John Drew Barrymore in 1966. They later married in 1985; then divorced in 1994.

== Filmography ==
- Dead Heat on a Merry-Go-Round (1966) as Frieda Schmid
- Luv (1967) as Linda
- The Comic (1969) as Sybil Atlas
- The Night Strangler (1973) as Charisma Beauty
