= Satan's Little Helper =

- Poster
- Directed by: Jeff Lieberman
- Written by: Jeff Lieberman
- Produced by: Mickey McDonough; Jeff Lieberman; Isen Robbins; Aimee Schoof
- Starring: Alexander Brickel; Katheryn Winnick; Amanda Plummer
- Cinematography: Dejan Georgevich
- Edited by: Jay Mathews
- Music by: David Horowitz
- Production company: Intrinsic Value Films
- Distributed by: Screen Media Films
- Release dates: May 6, 2004 (Tribeca Film Festival); October 4, 2005 (United States)
- Running time: 100 minutes
- Country: United States
- Language: English

Satan's Little Helper is a 2004 American horror film directed and written by Jeff Lieberman. The film stars Alexander Brickel as Dougie, a nine-year-old video gamer. On Halloween, Dougie meets a serial killer and unknowingly assists him in his murders. The film, which combines black comedy with horror, is Lieberman's first film as director in 17 years, since 1988's Remote Control. Satan's Little Helper was praised by reviewers for its satire, elements of comedy and characterization.

== Plot ==
Douglas "Dougie" Whooly is a nine-year-old boy obsessed with a video game, in which he plays Satan's little helper. His sister Jenna comes home from college for Halloween, but things turn sour when Dougie finds out she brought her boyfriend, Alex, with her.

After a fall out with Jenna, Dougie wanders off and finds a man dressed in a cheap costume arranging a dead body on his lawn as if it were a decoration. Dougie naively believes the man is Satan, and asks him for help in sending Alex to Hell, which "Satan" nods assent to. In the meantime, Alex comes up with the idea of bonding with Dougie by dressing as Satan for Halloween. When Dougie comes back home, he tries to lure Alex into the basement where Satan is waiting for him, but fails. Dougie ends up changing plans to instead have Alex ambushed by Satan while he and Alex go out shopping for a Satan costume, where Alex ends up being left for dead.

Dougie brings Satan home, whom everyone believes to be Alex. Despite Satan becoming forcefully, physically intimate with Jenna and his unwillingness to speak, Jenna interprets these as Alex's devotion to his Satan costume. When Satan and Dougie leave to get Halloween candy, they end up shoplifting a market for candy and tools, where Satan subsequently kills a bagger who tries to stop them and the two engage in a brief physical assault spree with their shopping cart. On the way home, Satan engages in a combination of assaulting and killing several more people, including Alex's estranged dad, before he and Dougie are accosted by the police. Satan indicates to Dougie to run home while he confronts the police, who are later found to be dead. In the meantime, it is revealed that Alex has survived, who finds out from a babbling man that all the police on the island are dead and the police station is on fire. When Dougie comes back home, he tells Jenna about what he and Satan have done. Still thinking that it is Alex in the Satan costume, Jenna begins to think that Alex is pushing the game too far.

After he comes home, his new personality starts to frighten her, she realizes he is not Alex. Dougie's father comes home, and Satan murders him. He kidnaps their mother, which makes Jenna and Alex go after him, only to think it's Alex's dad who is responsible, but are tricked by the killer repeatedly changing costumes and putting his old one on a victim, including a Jesus costume to trick Dougie into letting him into the house multiple times by saying that it is God coming to save him. In the end, Jenna and Mrs. Whooly accidentally kill Alex and are left at home with Dougie and a police man, who is actually the Satan Man, who spray paints a 6 on their home beneath their address, 66, turning it to 666. As he enters the house Jenna wonders why he doesn't speak, with Dougie saying it's so Satan doesn't hear him.

== Cast ==
- Alexander Brickel as Douglas "Dougie" Whooly
- Katheryn Winnick as Jenna Whooly
- Stephen Graham as Alex Martin
- Amanda Plummer as Merrill Whooly
- Wass M. Stevens as Dean Whooly (credited as Wass Stevens)
- Dan Ziskie as Vernon Martin
- Melisa McGregor as Nicole
- Joshua Annex as Billy Flarin (Satan Man)
- Joyce R. Korbin as Mrs. Sylvia Tishbaum
- Anthony Ardolino as Hunter
- Mary Kay Adams as Fran
- Christian Robert Varley as He Head
- Joanna Beckson as She Head (credited as Joanna Bechsen)
- Larry 'Ratso' Sloman as Mayor Flarin
- Lisa Barnes as Mrs. Flarin
- Jim Fitzpatrick as Pinocchio

== Reception ==
Variety called the film "Madly uneven", but wrote that it "delivers more than its share of exquisite creepy/funny bits but ultimately rests too much on the chubby little shoulders of a 9-year old. Still, horror buffs will delight in ingenious twists, perverse satire and gleefully off-kilter Amanda Plummer/Katheryn Winnick mother-daughter team."

The website JoBlo.com gave the film an 8/10 rating, writing, "if you like your horror with a heaping dose of the blackest of black comedy, then Satan’s Little Helper will be quite the treat! The flick is a prime example of horror on a low budget done right. Characters are actually developed, jokes are skillfully executed, and the scares are delivered with flair." Dread Central called the film "Irreverent, subversive and deliciously caustic [...] a unique and daring achievement", describing it as "a satiric commentary on the influence of videogames and fiction, the distinction between fantasy and reality for a child, and the danger and power of Halloween – all in a movie filled with blood, guts and black humour."

Satan's Little Helper was listed on Rolling Stone's 13 Terrifying Horror Movies You Can't Unsee.
