= Underground Aces =

- Directed by: Robert Butler
- Written by: James Carabatsos
- Produced by: Jay Weston
- Starring: Dirk Benedict; Melanie Griffith; Robert Hegyes; Jerry Orbach; Frank Gorshin
- Cinematography: Thomas Del Ruth
- Edited by: Argyle Nelson Jr.
- Music by: Pete Rugolo
- Distributed by: Filmways Pictures
- Release date: January 1981
- Running time: 95 minutes
- Country: United States
- Language: English

Underground Aces is a 1981 American comedy film directed by Robert Butler, and starring Dirk Benedict and Melanie Griffith.

== Plot ==
A group of misfits park cars in a hotel's underground parking lot, and get in plenty of trouble along the way.

== Cast ==
- Dirk Benedict as Pete Huffman
- Melanie Griffith as Lucy
- Rick Podell as Joe
- Randy Brooks as Ollie
- T. K. Carter as Dee Jay
- Kario Salem as Sheik
- Don Hawthorne as Rick
- Joshua Daniel as Wally
- Ralph Seymour as Zig
- Michael Winslow as Nate
- Robert Hegyes as Tico
- Fawne Harriman as Mitzi
- Audrey Landers as Annie Wenders
- Mimi Maynard as Madeline
- Jerry Orbach as Herbert Penlittle
- Frank Gorshin as Fred Kruger
- Sid Haig as Faoud
- William Mims
- Phil Adams as Chef
- Marlena Amey as Vamp
- Jerry Anderson as Mr. Naughton
- Selma Archerd as Sales Lady
- James Bacon as Businessman #2
- Kathleen Bracken as Lily
- Barbara Burroughs as Club Lady
- Twink Caplan as Marsha
- Jade Clark as Girl with Ripped Dress
- Steve Daron as Night Ace
- Bob Drew as Murphy
- Lynda Farrell as Cowgirl
- Andrea Frierson as Lena
- Gina Gallego as Juanita
- Sonny Gibson as Pro Bowler #2
- Bob Harders as Russell
- Sosimo Hernandez as Uncle Fausto
- Ernie Hudson as African General
- Nancy Jeris as Mrs. Wenders
- Nicky Katt as Son
- Kellie Khristiansen as Hooker
- Jack Krupnick as Pro Bowler #1
- Elli Maclure as Waitress (Credited as Ellie Maclure)
- Jock McNeil as Businessman #1
- Biff Manard as Pimp
- Marsha Meyers as Mother
- Sarah Miller as Club Lady
- Jed Mills as Father
- Jonathan Moore as Cook
- Yvonne Regalado as Rita
- Bill Smillie as Fire Chief
- Rebecca Stanley as Sally

== Release ==
Distributor Kino Lorber released the film on Blu-Ray on July 23, 2024.
