= David Ketchum =

American actor (1928–2025)

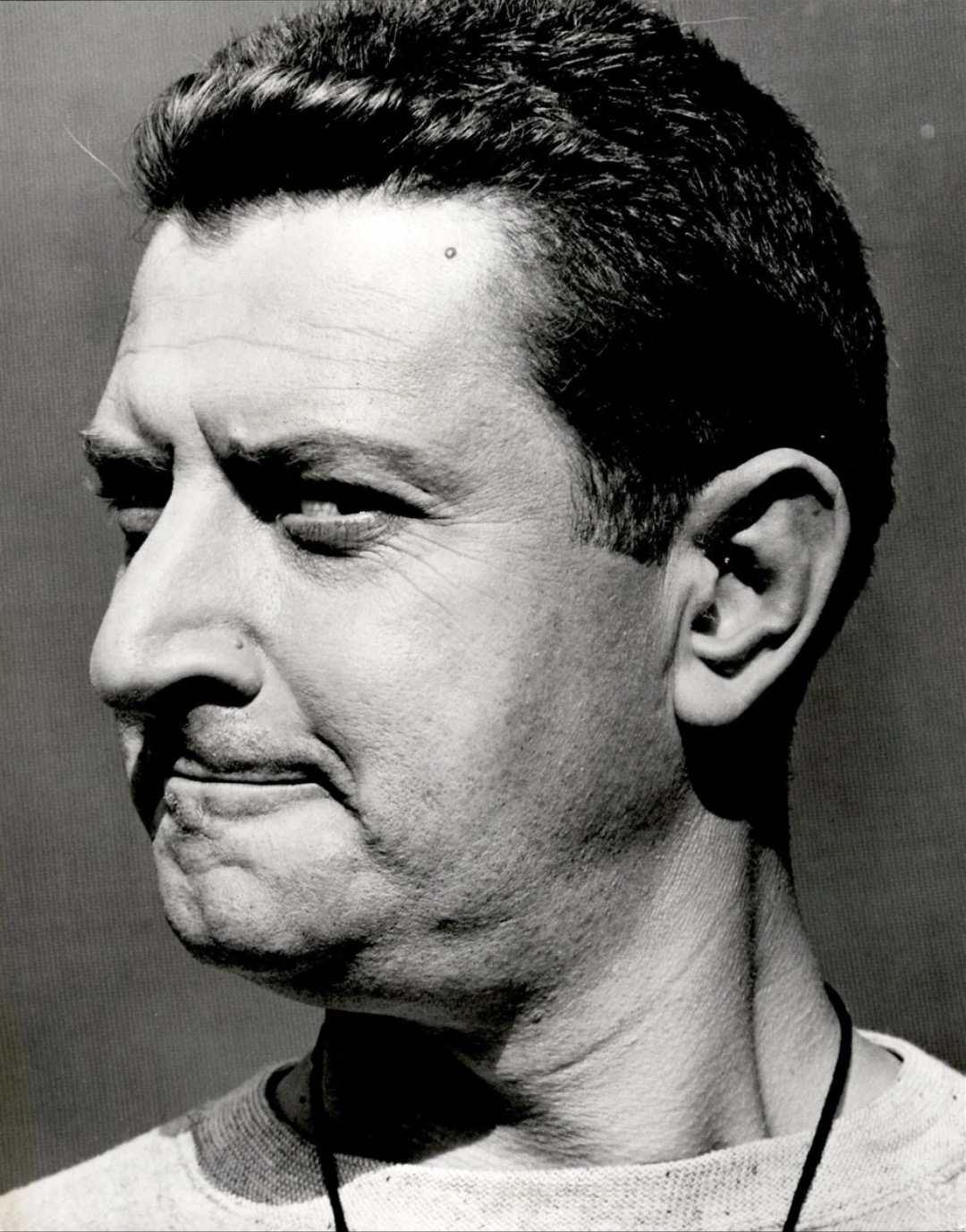
- Ketchum in Camp Runamuck, 1966
- Born: February 4, 1928; Quincy, Illinois, U.S.
- Died: August 10, 2025 (aged 97); Thousand Oaks, California, U.S.
- Occupations: Actor; comedian, writer
- Years active: 1960–1999
- Spouse: Louise Bryant (m. 1957)
- Children: 2

David Ketchum (February 4, 1928 – August 10, 2025) was an American actor and comedian, best known for his appearances in television sitcoms, including The Mary Tyler Moore Show, Camp Runamuck, and Get Smart.

== Life and career ==
Ketchum was born on February 4, 1928, in Quincy, Illinois. He studied physics at UCLA and joined other UCLA students in entertaining military personnel around the world for the USO.

Ketchum had a radio program for seven years in San Diego, California. On television, he portrayed Counselor Spiffy in Camp Runamuck. He was also a regular on I'm Dickens, He's Fenster, playing the role of Mel Warshaw.

In Get Smart, he played Agent 13, and was often seen in recurring jokes on the show hiding in unusual places such as mailboxes or fire hydrants. Ketchum reprised the role in the 1989 TV movie Get Smart Again as well as an episode of the 1995 revival of Get Smart on Fox. Ketchum also co-wrote one episode of the third season of the original series, titled "Classification: Dead." He also wrote scripts for other programs, including The Andy Griffith Show and Petticoat Junction.

In 1962, his comedy album The Long-Playing Tongue of Dave Ketchum was released. Billboard gave it a 4-star prefix for strong sales potential.

Films in which Ketchum appeared included Young Doctors in Love (1982) and The Other Sister (1999).

== Death ==
Ketchum married singer Louise Bryant in 1957 and had two daughters. He died of heart failure on August 10, 2025, in Thousand Oaks, California, at the age of 97. However, his death was not reported until August 22, 2025.

== Selected filmography ==
=== Film ===
Film
Year	Title	Role	Notes
1964	Good Neighbor Sam	Dave – Hertz Commercial Actor	Uncredited
1970	The Grasshopper	Football Conventioner	–
1971	Bless the Beasts & Children	Camp Director	–
1973	Your Three Minutes Are Up	Mr. Kellogg	–
1974	Goodnight Jackie	Mr. Green	–
1977	The Curious Case of the Campus Corpse	Writer cameo	Also credited as writer
1979	The North Avenue Irregulars	Capt. Bamford	–
1979	Love at First Bite	Customs Inspector	–
1979	The Main Event	Photographer	–
1982	Young Doctors in Love	Balloon Man	Credited as Dave Ketchum
1984	Harold and His Amazing Green Plants	Broccoli (voice)	Short film
1999	The Other Sister	College Maintenance Man #2	–

=== Television ===
Television
Year(s)	Title	Role	Notes
1960–1961	The Spike Jones Show	Himself	2 episodes
1961	Angel	Umpire / Repairman	2 episodes
1961	The Jim Backus Show	Dorcy Howard	1 episode
1962–1963	I’m Dickens, He’s Fenster	Mel Warshaw	23 episodes
1963	The Real McCoys	Lou Hicks	1 episode
1964	The Joey Bishop Show	Dr. Mar… / Floorwalker	2 episodes
1964	The Tycoon	Worker	1 episode
1964	The Jack Benny Program	Mr. Thrombry	1 episode
1965	The Munsters	Master of Ceremonies	1 episode
1965	Roger Ramjet	Announcer (voice)	8 episodes
1965–1966	Camp Runamuck	Spiffy	26 episodes
1966–1967	Hey, Landlord	Dr. Sand… / Haskell the Rascal / Wilson	4 episodes
1966–1967	Get Smart	Agent 13	13 episodes
1967	The Andy Griffith Show	Fred Michaels / Harry Walker	2 episodes
1967	Good Morning World	Henry Horn / Bert	2 episodes
1967	The Carol Burnett Show	George	1 episode
1967	Accidental Family	Mr. Jennings / Scott	2 episodes
1968	Petticoat Junction	Buddy Buster	1 episode
1968	Gomer Pyle: USMC	Sol Gordon	1 episode
1967–1971	Green Acres	Photographer / Harvey Schmidlapp	2 episodes
1969–1970	The Courtship of Eddie’s Father	Joe Kelly	3 episodes
1970	The Mary Tyler Moore Show	Hal	1 episode
1968–1970	That Girl	Man in Restaurant / Harry / Jack Packard	3 episodes
1970	Arnie	Grant	1 episode
1969	Mod Squad	Jake Barry	1 episode
1969	Mayberry R.F.D.	Man	1 episode
1969–1973	Love, American Style	Alfred	4 episodes
1972	Call Holme	Sergeant Dobbs	TV movie
1972–1973	The ABC Saturday Superstar Movie	Various voices	2 episodes
1972	The Partridge Family	Mr. Phelps	1 episode
1971	The Odd Couple	Joe / The Cop	2 episodes
1971	My Three Sons	Milton Baxter	1 episode
1971	The New Dick Van Dyke Show	Fred Ross	1 episode
1973	Thicker Than Water	–	1 episode
1974	Maude	Herman Ellinger	1 episode
1975	The Fireman’s Ball	Captain O’Hara	TV movie
1976	How to Break Up a Happy Divorce	Professor Schofield	TV movie
1977	Alice	Carl	1 episode
1978	Mork & Mindy	The Salesman	1 episode
1974–1984	Happy Days	Donald Hedg… / Coach Pelino / Lt. Col. Binicky	5 episodes
1986	Perfect Strangers	Customer	1 episode
1989	Get Smart, Again!	Agent 13	TV movie
1995	Get Smart (revival)	Agent 13	1 episode
