= Luv (film) =

1967 film by Clive Donner

- Directed by: Clive Donner
- Written by: Elliott Baker
- Based on: Luv by Murray Schisgal
- Produced by: Martin Manulis
- Starring: Jack Lemmon; Peter Falk; Elaine May; Nina Wayne; Eddie Mayehoff
- Cinematography: Ernest Laszlo
- Edited by: Harold F. Kress
- Music by: Gerry Mulligan
- Color process: Technicolor
- Production company: Jalem Productions
- Distributed by: Columbia Pictures
- Release date: 26 July 1967
- Running time: 93 minutes
- Country: United States
- Language: English
- Box office: $1 million (US/ Canada)

Luv is a 1967 American slapstick romantic comedy film directed by Clive Donner and starring Jack Lemmon, Peter Falk, Elaine May and Nina Wayne. It is based on the original Broadway production of the same name by Murray Schisgal, which opened at the Booth Theatre in New York City on 11 November 1964; the play ran for 901 performances and was nominated for the Tony Award for Best Play at the 19th Tony Awards. The film was produced by Lemmon's independent film production company, Jalem Productions, in cooperation with Martin Manulis.

== Plot ==
Scrawny Harry Berlin is a barely functional human being, about to tentatively jump off a bridge. As he contemplates his suicide attempt, he is distracted by Milt Manville, an old friend from fifteen years ago. Harry doesn't really recognize him at first, but Milt's force of personality steers Harry away from the bridge and into his company. There appears to be a contrast between the two of them, with Milt boasting of how well he is doing in life while Harry tries to listen.

Milt takes Harry to his house to meet Ellen Manville, Milt's long-suffering wife. She is complaining that their sex life is non-existent, unaware Milt has a secret lover in the form of beautiful blonde Linda, a fitness instructor. Milt convinces a barely-there Harry to make a go of things with Ellen, to inspire her to seek a divorce from him that she has been otherwise unwilling to grant. It takes a while but Harry and Ellen eventually fall in love. They marry and go to Niagara Falls for their honeymoon, but shortly Ellen realizes that Harry is the world's worst roommate and childish at heart. In one example, Harry unexpectedly stomps on Ellen's toe in order to test her love for him. As she hobbles in pain, she asks, "What did you do that for?" In response, he asks her if she still loves him, and she says she does. They proceed to exchange escalating blows and public humiliations to each other, to keep proving their love can withstand conflict.

Milt, who has been left with little resources in the divorce settlement, quickly marries Linda and they settle down as a couple in a comparably smaller apartment. Linda has quit her fitness work, and has been content to stay at home and lounge, forcing Milt to be the sole provider. To sustain their standard of living, Milt sells some of their household items to previous clients of his part-time junk business for a quick buck. Linda immediately dumps him, which causes Milt to be further economically decimated, and wanting Ellen back when he realizes how much he truly loves her. Ellen admits in turn that she doesn't really love Harry as much as she thought, as his bizarre day-to-day activities get to her. Milt and Ellen plot to get back together and convince Harry to divorce her, but in desperation to keep their new marriage intact, Harry agrees to get a job as an elevator operator in a department store, to prove he can be an equal partner in their home.

Milt and Ellen then get the idea of trying to make Harry fall in love with the pretty blonde Linda, unaware that the two have had a disastrous encounter during his ill-fated tenure at the department store. When they are brought together by the ex-spouses at a Japanese restaurant, they react badly to seeing each other again and make a scene. As a last resort, Milt orchestrates bringing Harry back to the bridge he previously found him, to either induce him to suicide or fake it by pushing him off. Ellen, meeting them at the bridge, is horrified at the concept, but does attempt to assist Milt; between her reticence and Harry's frequent tics and blackouts, it is Milt who twice falls off the bridge. In attempting to retrieve him from a scaffold on his second fall, Ellen too is endangered. Linda, taking a late-night power walk, is enlisted by Harry to try raising the scaffold to bring Milt and Ellen to safety, but instead all of them end up in the water. Harry, who cannot swim, is kept afloat by the athletic Linda, and becomes attracted to her, while Milt and Ellen reaffirm their love for each other.

== Cast ==
- Jack Lemmon as Harry Berlin
- Peter Falk as Milt Manville
- Elaine May as Ellen Manville
- Nina Wayne as Linda
- Eddie Mayehoff as D.A. Goodhart
- Paul Hartman as Doyle
- Severn Darden as Vandergist
- Alan DeWitt as Dalrymple

The uncredited cast includes Terrayne Crawford as a woman on the playground, Harrison Ford as an irate motorist and Cap Somers as a bartender.

== Reception ==
Variety wrote: "Clive Donner's direction fits the frantic overtones of unfoldment, but in this buildup occasionally goes overboard for effect. Jack Lemmon appears to over-characterize his role, a difficult one for exact shading. Peter Falk as a bright-eyed schemer scores decisively in a restrained comedy enactment for what may be regarded as the picture's top performance.

Bosley Crowther's review in The New York Times was particularly critical, ending the review with: "It goes around in circles—but maybe going around in circles is your whim. If it is, Luv is the picture to make you dizzy doing so."

== Home media ==
Luv was released to DVD by Sony Pictures Home Entertainment on January 3, 2012 as a Region 1 manufacture-on-demand DVD available through Amazon and from Mill Creek Entertainment on April 22, 2014 as a part of the Jack Lemmon Showcase Volume 1 set with Luv on the fourth disc of a 4-disc set. On January 31, 2023, it was released on Blu-ray by Mill Creek Entertainment as part of a 4-film, 2-disc Peter Falk collection.

== See also ==
- List of American films of 1967
