= Jeff Lieberman =

American film director and screenwriter (born 1947)

- Born: October 16, 1947 (age 78); Brooklyn, New York City, New York
- Education: School of Visual Arts
- Occupations: Film director, screenwriter

Jeff Lieberman (born October 16, 1947) is an American film director and screenwriter, known for his cult horror and thriller films Squirm (1976), Blue Sunshine (1977) and Just Before Dawn (1981).

== Biography ==
Jeff Lieberman was born in 1947 in the Brooklyn borough of New York City. He made his feature film debut as the writer and director of the nature horror film Squirm (1976), about earthworms inundating a small Southern town and wreaking havoc. His following film, Blue Sunshine (1977), followed a series of murders in Los Angeles, connected to the killers' use of a certain strain of LSD. Blue Sunshine screened at the Cannes Film Festival, as well as the London Film Festival and Edinburgh International Film Festival. In 1981, Lieberman wrote and directed the slasher film Just Before Dawn, about a group of campers stalked by a killer in the backwoods of Oregon.

In 1988, Lieberman wrote and directed Remote Control, a science fiction film following a video store clerk who discovers a videotape circulating in his store is brainwashing its viewers. He subsequently wrote the screenplay for The NeverEnding Story III (1994). He later wrote and directed the satirical comedy horror film Satan's Little Helper (2004).

== Filmography ==
=== As director ===
Year	Title	Notes
1972	The Ringer	Short film
1976	Squirm	
1977	Blue Sunshine	
1980	Doctor Franken	Television film
1981	Just Before Dawn	
1988	Remote Control	
1994	But... Seriously	Documentary
1995	Sonny Liston: The Mysterious Life and Death of a Champion	Television film
2004	Satan's Little Helper	

=== As screenwriter ===
Year	Title	Notes
1972	The Ringer	
1973	Blade	
1976	Squirm	
1977	Blue Sunshine	
1980	Doctor Franken	
1981	Just Before Dawn	
1988	Remote Control	
1994	The Neverending Story III	
2004	Satan's Little Helper	
2006	'Til Death Do Us Part	Television series, creator, 3 episodes

== Bibliography ==
- Towlson, Jon (2016). Elizabeth McCarthy; Bernice M. Murphy (eds.). Lost Souls of Horror and the Gothic: Fifty-Four Neglected Authors, Actors, Artists and Others. North Carolina Jefferson: McFarland. pp. 130–134. ISBN 9781476626536.
