= Joseph Beruh =

American theatrical producer

Joseph Beruh (1924 – October 30, 1989) was an American theatrical producer of Broadway and Off-Broadway plays and musicals. He worked frequently with Edgar Lansbury as co-producer. For 15 years, he was the general manager of the Sheridan Square Playhouse. He also produced films and was an occasion actor. Beruh was a graduate of Carnegie Mellon University. He died in his sleep of a heart attack at age 65.

== Notable productions ==
- The Magic Show (1974)
- Gypsy (1974)
- The Night That Made America Famous (1975)
- Godspell (1976)
- American Buffalo (1977)

== Film Producer ==
- The Clairvoyant (1982)
- He Knows You're Alone (1980)
- Blue Sunshine (1977)
- Squirm (1976)
- The Wild Party (1975)
- Camera Three (1971)
