= Ralph Seymour (actor) =

American film, stage and television actor

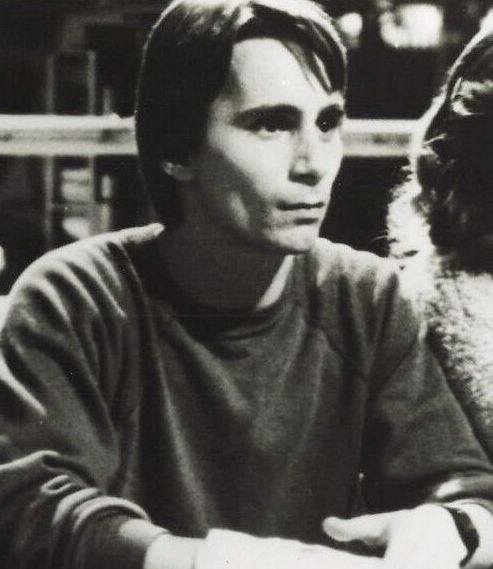
- Seymour in Longshot (1981)
- Born: May 4, 1956 (age 70); Lansing, Illinois, U.S.
- Occupation: Actor
- Years active: 1976–2002

Ralph Seymour (born May 4, 1956) is an American film, stage, and television actor. He began his career in theater, starring on Broadway in a production of Peter Shaffer's Equus. His early film credits include Underground Aces, Longshot, Back Roads, Just Before Dawn (all 1981). Seymour also had supporting roles in Killer Party (1986), Empire of the Sun (1987), and Rain Man (1988).

== Biography ==
Seymour was born in Lansing, Illinois, the third of five children. He graduated from Thornton Fractional South High School in Lansing in 1974, and was active performing in school plays and community theater.

Seymour relocated to New York City, where he appeared on Broadway as Alan Strang in a production of Peter Shaffer's Equus between 1976 and 1977.

He appeared in the short-lived sitcom Makin' It (1979) before making his film debut in Underground Aces (1981). Next, he co-starred with Leif Garrett and Linda Manz in the television film Longshot (1981), about a group of teenage foosball players.

Seymour subsequently appeared in the comedy Back Roads (1981) with Sally Field and Tommy Lee Jones, and had roles in the slasher film Just Before Dawn (also 1981) and the comedies Surf II (1983) and Meatballs Part II (1984).

Other film roles include in the horror-comedies Ghoulies (1985) and Killer Party (1986), the drama Empire of the Sun (1987), and the comedy-drama Rain Man (1988).

== Filmography ==
=== Film ===
Year	Title	Role	Notes	Ref.
1981	Underground Aces	Zig		
1981	Back Roads	Gosler		
1981	Just Before Dawn	Daniel		
1981	Longshot	Leroy Curtis		
1983	Surf II	Becker		
1984	Meatballs Part II	Eddie		
1985	Ghoulies	Mark		
1985	Fletch	Creasy		
1985	Pee-wee's Big Adventure	Francis' Accomplice		
1986	Killer Party	Martin		
1987	Empire of the Sun	Cohen		
1988	Rain Man	Lenny		
1989	Let It Ride	Sid		
1992	Rage and Honor	Sleazoid		
1997	The Relic	Sergeant		

=== Select television ===
Year	Title	Role	Notes	Ref.
1979	Makin' It	Al 'Kingfish' Sorrentino	Main role	
1992	Sinatra	Budd	Miniseries	
