= John Dukakis =

American actor and music executive

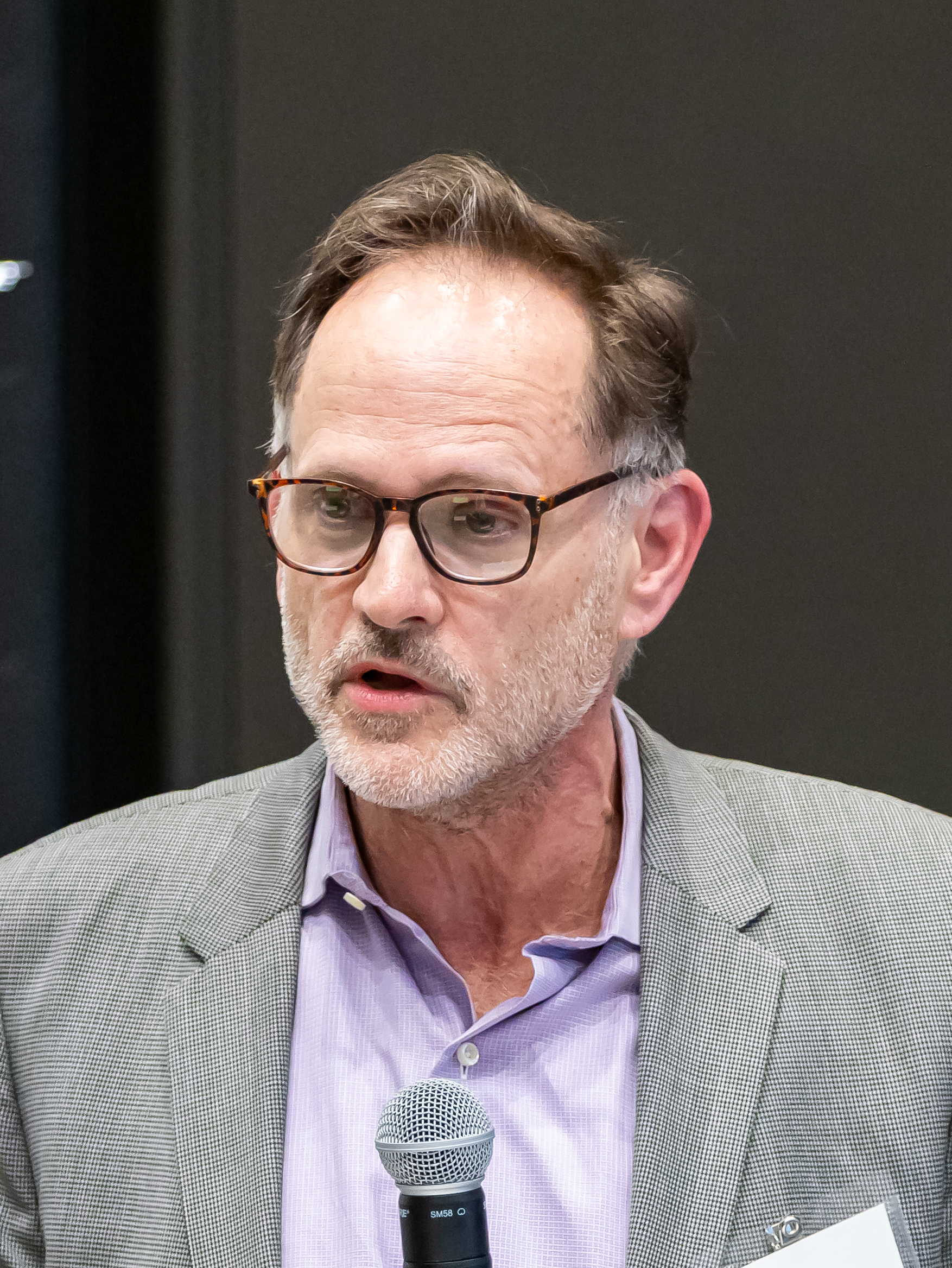
- Dukakis in 2024
- Born: John Chaffetz Jr. June 9, 1958 (age 68); San Jose, California, U.S.
- Education: Brown University
- Occupation: Actor; music executive
- Spouses: Lisa Thurmond (m. 1982; div. 2000) Adriana Sierra (m. 2002; div. 2020)
- Children: 4
- Parents: Kitty Dukakis; John Chaffetz (biological father); Michael Dukakis (adoptive father)
- Relatives: Jason Chaffetz (half-brother)

John Dukakis (né Chaffetz; born June 9, 1958) is an American former actor, record executive, and political aide.

== Early life ==
Dukakis was born John Chaffetz Jr. in San Jose, California, on June 9, 1958, and grew up in the Boston area. He is the son of Kitty Dukakis and John Chaffetz, a businessman, and the adopted son of former Massachusetts Governor and 1988 Democratic presidential nominee Michael Dukakis whom his mother married when he was five. His half-brother, through his biological father, is Jason Chaffetz who was a U.S. Representative from Utah from 2009 to 2017. He changed his name from Chaffetz to Dukakis at age 18.

== Acting career ==
While attending Brown University in the 1970s, Dukakis was cast in Universal's Jaws 2. He relocated to Hollywood and continued to work as an actor for the next six years. He had substantial roles in the films Making Love, Delusion, and Split Image, as well as on television in Knots Landing, Family Ties; Little House on the Prairie; Taxi; the Jim Jones docudrama, Guyana Tragedy: The Story of Jim Jones; and Three Sovereigns for Sarah. He finished his career in New York working on the Broadway and Off-Broadway stage.

== Political career ==
After retiring from acting, he secured a job in Washington, D.C., as a legislative assistant to U.S. Senator John Kerry in Kerry's first two years in office. In 1987, when Michael Dukakis announced his intention to run for President of the United States, John left Washington and moved to Atlanta to run the Southern campaign prior to the Super Tuesday primaries. Later, as the Democratic National Political Director, he campaigned nationally on behalf of the unsuccessful Dukakis–Bentsen ticket.

== Music industry ==
With the 1988 campaign over, John began work with an attorney in Boston named Bob Woolf who had built a significant international practice representing professional athletes. John ran the music business management department and spent most of his time on a developing local act: New Kids on the Block. Within several years the company grew and he was sent to Los Angeles to open an office there with an emphasis on working with other established and developing acts. When he left the company in 1992, the company was also working with Boyz II Men and Marky Mark and the Funky Bunch.

Dukakis left Bob Woolf to become the general manager of Paisley Park Records, a joint venture between the artist Prince and Warner Bros. Records. During his tenure, the company released a Prince album as well as projects from George Clinton and Mavis Staples.

In 1994, he formed a new venture with his partner, Qadree El-Amin. Southpaw Entertainment was a full service management company. In its early years it primarily focused on the management of Boyz II Men. But after the record-setting success of the 12× platinum II album, the company took on new clients. Over the years, Southpaw also handled the careers of Janet Jackson, Vanessa Williams, Brownstone, and Blackstreet.

In early 2002, Dukakis left Southpaw to take a position as an Executive Vice President of Overbrook Music, a music label as well as a full service management company owned and operated by Will Smith and his partner, James Lassiter. The company released the multi-platinum-certified soundtrack for the film Wild Wild West as well as the gold-certified soundtrack for the film Love & Basketball. The company manages Will Smith and also Christina Vidal (MCA Records, Nickelodeon's Taina), Jordan Knight (Interscope Records), Deborah Cox (J Records), singer/songwriter Javier (Capitol Records), Singer/songwriter Maria (DreamWorks Records), and Samantha Mumba (Polydor/Interscope records.

In December 2007, Dukakis returned to Boston to serve as Senior Vice President heading up Hill Holliday's emerging branded-entertainment division.

== Filmography ==
- Jaws 2 (1978) – Polo
- Taxi (1979) -- one episode
- Delusion (1980) – Gabriel Langrock
- Knots Landing (1980) -Beach Patron
- King of the Mountain (1981) – Duke
- Making Love (1982) – Tim
- Split Image (1982) – Aaron
- Family Ties (1983) – Jeff
- Three Sovereigns for Sarah (1985) – Joseph Putman
