= Squirm =

1976 American natural horror film directed by Jeff Lieberman

- Theatrical release poster
- Directed by: Jeff Lieberman
- Written by: Jeff Lieberman
- Produced by: George Manasse
- Starring: Don Scardino; Patricia Pearcy; R. A. Dow; Fran Higgins; Peter MacLean; Jean Sullivan
- Cinematography: Joseph Mangine
- Edited by: Brian Smedley-Aston
- Music by: Robert Prince
- Production company: The Squirm Company
- Distributed by: American International Pictures
- Release date: July 14, 1976
- Running time: 93 minutes
- Country: United States
- Language: English

Squirm is a 1976 American natural horror film written and directed by Jeff Lieberman in his feature-film directing debut, starring Don Scardino, Patricia Pearcy, R. A. Dow, Jean Sullivan, Peter MacLean, Fran Higgins, and William Newman. The film takes place in the fictional town of Fly Creek, Georgia, which becomes infested with carnivorous worms after an electrical storm. Lieberman's script is based on a childhood incident in which his brother fed electricity into a patch of earth, causing earthworms to rise to the surface.

Most of the financing came from Broadway producers Edgar Lansbury and Joseph Beruh. Millions of worms were used over the five-week filming in Port Wentworth, Georgia; worms were brought in from Maine to augment local supplies. Makeup artist Rick Baker provided the special effects, using prosthetics for the first time in his career. After American International Pictures picked up Squirm for distribution, it was edited to remove the most graphic scenes in an unsuccessful attempt to lower its "R" rating to "PG". The film was a commercial success, but opened to lukewarm reviews. It has since become a critical favorite and a cult classic.

== Plot ==
On September 29, 1975, in the rural town of Fly Creek, Georgia, a powerful storm topples an overhead power line, leaving the area without electricity. The power line lands in wet mud and electrifies the worms underneath. The next morning, Geri Sanders borrows a truck from her neighbor, worm farmer Roger Grimes, to pick up her boyfriend Mick, who is arriving from New York City for a vacation. While Geri and Mick go to town, Roger's shipment of 100,000 bloodworms and sandworms escape from the back of the truck. Mick enters a diner, where the local sheriff says over 300,000 volts are being released into the ground from severed power lines. Mick orders an egg cream and finds a worm in it, though the owner and Sheriff Jim Reston believe he placed it there himself as a prank.

Geri introduces Mick to her mother Naomi and sister Alma before they both leave to browse at antique dealer Aaron Beardsley's house. Outside, Roger's father Willie finds the shipment of worms is missing. Roger sees Mick with Geri and becomes envious of their relationship. After arriving at Beardsley's house, Geri and Mick cannot find him, but Geri sees a human skeleton outside the property. They summon Sheriff Reston, but the skeleton has apparently disappeared when he arrives. Thinking it is another prank, Reston threatens to arrest Mick if he returns to the town. While asking locals about Beardsley's whereabouts, they find out he was last seen before the storm. Mick believes he himself unintentionally released the worms; he apologizes to Roger and invites him to go fishing with him and Geri. They eventually find the skeleton in Roger's truck.

While on the boat, Mick is bitten by a worm. Roger shows his bitten-off thumb and tells Mick and Geri that worms attack when electrified. Mick gets off the boat to tend to his wound, leaving Geri with Roger. Next, Mick and Alma take the skeleton's skull to an abandoned dental office, where they compare its teeth with patient X-rays and confirm the skeleton is Beardsley's. Roger makes advances towards Geri, but the worms brought as bait attack him and crawl into his face. He runs off into the woods; Geri later tells Mick what happened. Mick and Geri visit the worm farm to find Roger, but Mick finds Willie's body being eaten by worms. They report their findings to Sheriff Reston, but he ignores them. Mick deduces the worms killed Beardsley but cannot figure out why they attacked him.

While Mick and Geri are eating dinner with Naomi and Alma, the worms eat through the roots of a tree, causing it to crash into the house. Mick realizes electricity is still being released from the power lines and that the wet soil is acting as a conductor; he further hypothesizes the worms only come out at night. Mick tells Geri to keep everyone inside equipped with candles (in order to ward off the worms) and leaves to get plywood to board up the house. Roger, whose face has been deformed by worms, attacks Mick in the woods and knocks him unconscious. He then enters the house and kidnaps Geri. The worms infest the house and attack other places in town. Sheriff Reston and his date are eaten alive in a jail cell, and people at a bar are attacked and eaten.

Mick regains consciousness and finds Naomi's remains, covered in worms, at the house. When he goes upstairs, Roger attacks and chases him downstairs. Mick pushes Roger into a pile of worms, which engulf him. Mick frees Geri and tells her that Naomi, and possibly Alma, are dead. While they try escaping through a window, Roger crawls out of the pile of worms and bites Mick in the leg. Mick beats Roger to death with a flashlight before climbing into a tree with Geri, where they stay until morning. Upon waking, they observe that the worms have disappeared; a lineman informs them that power has been restored to the town. Alma, who survived by hiding in a chest, emerges and looks out the window. Geri and Mick rush into the house to meet her.

== Cast ==
- Don Scardino as Mick
- Patricia Pearcy as Geraldine "Geri" Sanders
- R. A. Dow as Roger Grimes
- Jean Sullivan as Naomi Sanders
- Peter MacLean as Sheriff Jim Reston
- Fran Higgins as Alma Sanders
- William Newman as Quigley
- Barbara Quinn as Sheriff's Girl
- Carl Dagenhart as Willie Grimes
- Angel Sande as Millie
- Carol Jean Owens as Lizzie
- Kim Leon Iocovozzi as Hank
- Walter Dimmick as Danny
- Leslie Thorsen as Bonnie
- Julia Klopp as Mrs. Klopp
- William A. Lindblad as Power Line Repairman

== Production ==
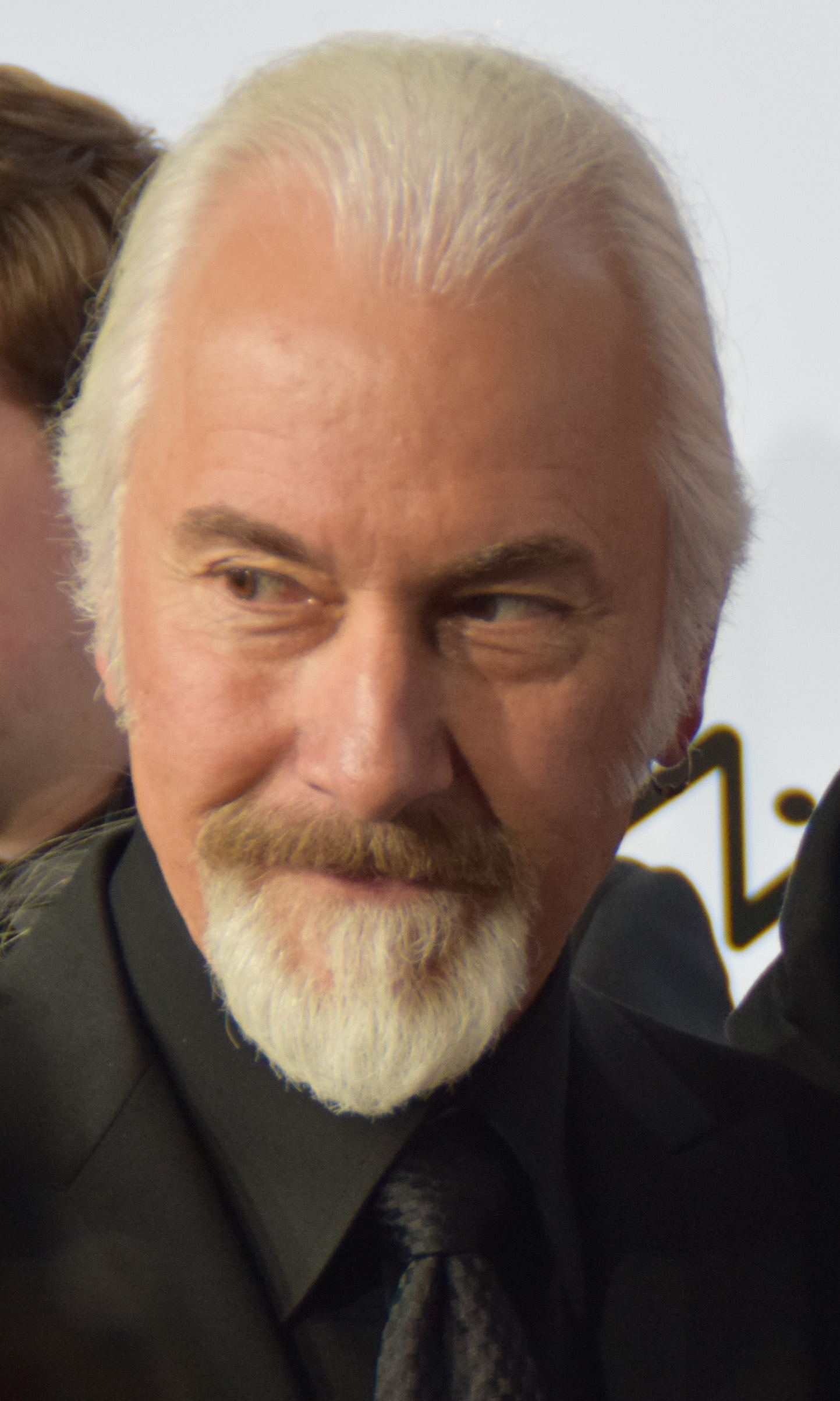
Special make-up effects artist Rick Baker provided the make-up for Squirm.

Squirm was written by Jeff Lieberman, who at the time was working for Janus Films on a series called The Art of Film; he developed Squirm as an after-work project to help deal with his "frustrations over having to put on a tie". The script was based on a childhood incident in which Lieberman's brother connected a transformer to the ground to force worms to emerge so he could use them for a fishing trip, which "scared the shit out of" Lieberman. He was also inspired by a news story from Floyds Knobs, Indiana, about migrating millipedes invading homes and by the 1963 film The Birds.

Lieberman completed a rough draft in six weeks and gave it to producer George Manasse, who saw potential in it. Manasse showed Lieberman's script to then-independent Broadway producers Edgar Lansbury and Joseph Beruh. They read the script during the warm U.S. summer months of 1975, after which the project moved swiftly, with the producers buying Squirm and investing $470,000 of their own money into the project. Squirm was the only film produced by The Squirm Company. The original setting and filming location was planned to be New England but the filming was changed to Port Wentworth, Georgia, due to unsuitable autumn weather conditions in the northeastern U.S. Production began in the warmer climate of Georgia in the late autumn of November 1975.

Kim Basinger auditioned for the role of Geri, but Lieberman passed on her, believing that the audience would not believe that she would live in a "hick town". Lieberman later regretted the decision, calling himself an idiot. Martin Sheen was originally cast to play the role of Mick, but was replaced with Don Scardino. Sheen suggested that the character of Mick should be an actor and had wanted him to recite the Yorick scene from Hamlet when he discovers Aaron Beardsley's skull in the film. Jean Sullivan, who played Geri's mother Naomi, based her Southern accent on Tennessee Williams. To prepare for his part as Roger, R. A. Dow spent weeks rehearsing in Port Wentworth using the method acting technique.

Half of the worms used in the film were made of rubber; the others included large sandworms from Maine, refrigerated and transported to Port Wentworth, and an estimated 3 million bloodworms provided by the University of Georgia Oceanographic Institute. To get the worms to move, wires were run under them and electrified. One scene in which a living room is filled with worms was accomplished by building a scaffolding four feet (1.2 m) above the ground; a canvas was placed on top and covered with a six-inch layer of thousands of worms. The local Boy Scouts troop was hired to move the canvas from below to make the worms undulate; they received merit badges for their work. After production wrapped, newspapers in Maine reported the local fishing industry had been impacted by a shortage of worms caused by the production of the film.

Brian Smedley-Aston edited Squirm. Robert Prince composed the score and also conducted a full orchestra in England for the film. Bernard Herrmann, composer for The Day the Earth Stood Still (1951) and Psycho (1960), was originally slated to write the score but died before beginning work. Joe Mangine was the director of photography and Henry Shrady was the art director. Special make-up effects artist Rick Baker created the make-up in New York for R. A. Dow's character Roger, who turns into "Wormface". He made a facial mold using prosthetics, which he had never worked with before. The fake worms were drawn through Dow's skin using monofilament fishing line covered in lubricant.

Principal photography wrapped after five weeks, one of which was dedicated to working with the worms. Lieberman was heavily involved with the post-production work, which included making the sound effects for the worms using balloons and shears, and looping the two sounds using multitrack recording. The opening and closing sound of the shears was used for the worm teeth. The worms' screams were taken from a scene in which pigs are slaughtered in Brian De Palma's 1976 film Carrie.

== Release ==
Squirm was shown during the May 1976 Cannes Film Market. It was acquired by American International Pictures (AIP), who released it theatrically in the United States on July 14, 1976, and worldwide on August 9 that same year. AIP had given a $250,000 advance to the film's producers for domestic distribution and $500,000 in guarantees from sixteen territories.

AIP hoped for a "PG" rating from the Motion Picture Association of America (MPAA), but the MPAA objected to nearly all the horror scenes as "objectionable to PG-rated sensibilities". The film was edited to remove most of the scariest material in addition to a shower scene with Patricia Pearcy. This cut the running time by 1 minute. The now 92-minute film, however, still received an "R" rating. In 1977, the MPAA re-rated the film with a "PG" rating. The TV version of the film was even more extensively cut: Lieberman commented that, "In the theatrical version there was just enough of the worm attacks left for them to work; on TV, the cuts are ridiculous!" The film was financially successful; Lansbury and Beruh recovered their investment from the foreign theatrical market.

The film was released on VHS by Vestron Video in 1983 and on DVD by MGM Home Entertainment in 2003. The DVD version, with a 93-minute run time, restored the shower scene and included an audio commentary with Lieberman as part of the special features. MGM released it as part of a set with Swamp Thing (1982) and The Return of the Living Dead (1985) in 2011. The unedited R-rated version was released in the United Kingdom on Blu-ray and DVD by Arrow Video on September 23, 2013. This version was released in the United States on Blu-ray by Shout! Factory under its label Scream Factory on October 28, 2014. Squirm was also released on streaming services Amazon Prime Video, Tubi, and Shudder.

== Reception ==
The gruesomeness of worms burrowing into Roger's face was recognized by critics, who praised the special effects.

Opinions on the film's horror elements and special effects were mostly positive, with several reviewers crediting the special effects for conveying a sense of gruesome creepiness. A TV Guide contributor described the worm scenes as "genuinely terrifying", and Cinefantastique contributor Kyle B. Counts found a shot of the worms burrowing into Roger's face "expertly gruesome". Vincent Canby, writing in The New York Times, felt the worm scenes were "effectively revolting", though he disliked the shot of Roger sinking into a pile of worms, comparing it to spaghetti with meat sauce. In his 2019 book American International Pictures, Rob Craig agreed that the movie's horror was made effective by Baker's gory make-up. Craig was also impressed that the film managed to convey a "sense of dread" with the use of a traditionally non-threatening creature like the earthworm, by "amassing [them] into a gigantic horde which becomes a mass-minded killing force". Another retrospective reviewer, in the 2013 edition of Leonard Maltin's Movie Guide, assessed the film as an "above-average horror outing [that] builds to good shock sequences". Robert Prince's use of synthesizers in the music score produced an "unnerving effect" according to Donald Guarisco of AllMovie.

Critics were less impressed with the film's production and performances, and were divided on Lieberman's direction. Kevin Thomas of the Los Angeles Times argued that Lieberman showed "plenty of panache [...] deftly playing a disarming folksy atmosphere against rapidly escalating peril", and TV Guide thought it was underrated, "as with most of Lieberman's work". Counts criticized the director's handling of the creepy moments in the film as "oppressively clumsy", and Variety magazine also found the creepy special effects were offset by "clumsy and amateurish" production. The cinematography was praised by critics; John Kenneth Muir commended the filmmaking along with the film's imagery, though he found the inconsistent tone and lack of believable characters "a letdown". In Canby's opinion, Scardino and Pearcy gave decent performances.

Squirm received lukewarm reviews upon its release from Variety and The New York Times, but impressions changed over time. Counts, an early reviewer, criticized the way the film cut away from violent moments to scenes of comic relief, saying that it undermined the film's "threadbare" tension, but Thomas thought the film had a good balance between humor and terror. John Pym of The Monthly Film Bulletin thought the film's use of humor and narrative rendered Squirm a commendable and scary addition to the genre. Guarisco described Squirm as an "excellent example of the 'revenge of nature' horror" genre, and praised its third act for getting viewers invested in the fate of the characters. The film received generally positive retrospective evaluations, earning it cult classic status and recognition for its humor and themes; Time listed Squirm as one of the best "Killer-Animal Movies" in 2010, noting its "sick twist" on the shower scene in Psycho. A TV Guide contributor gave positive marks to its handling of the tongue-in-cheek humor and scares, including the tribute to Psycho. Craig considered it to be "an entertaining—and fairly insightful—film which is certainly not uncritical to its main characters and their community". Jim Craddock, author of VideoHound's Golden Movie Retriever, gave a less than positive review and summarized it as an "okay" giant worm movie. On the review aggregator website Rotten Tomatoes, 31% of 16 critics' reviews are positive, with an average rating of 4.5/10.

== Analysis ==
Squirm can be seen as a "revenge of nature" film, a genre which began in the early 1970s with films like Frogs and Night of the Lepus. Jaws, the most important film in the genre, spawned "Jawsploitation" films which attempted to take advantage of its success, but film studies scholar I. Q. Hunter argues that Jaws "merely served to perpetuate the early-1970s genre Quentin Tarantino called the 'Mother Nature goes ape-shit kind of movie'". Muir describes the genre as "eco-horror", commenting that "these films reflected genuine audience trepidation that Mother Nature would not stand for Man's continued pillaging and pollution of the Earth".

The film critic Robin Wood, in a discussion of horror films showing the re-emergence of repressed sexual and familial tensions, included Squirm as an example of the "revenge of nature" motif and argued that the survival of three of the main characters runs "counter to the film's logic" of the unstoppable natural forces that the worms represent. Rob Craig also commented on the sexual undercurrents in the film, arguing that in the context of the film's treatment of rural folk as "ignorant, divisive, reactionary, corrupt, and quite possibly lunatic", the worms can be seen as a metaphor for "a country bumpkin's slimy, limp penis: a laughably vulnerable object by itself, but fearsomely dangerous in aggregate", which in turn implies the rural men are "a gaggle of 'limp noodles' which are nonetheless dangerous as a societal force". Kyle B. Counts notes similarities between the themes of "masculine ideals" in Squirm and Straw Dogs, in which the male leads are heroes, and also said the film does not give the impression Don Scardino's character grew into a "man" after his experience.

Lieberman wrote the foreword for Jon Towlson's 2014 book Subversive Horror Cinema: Countercultural Messages of Films from Frankenstein to the Present. In this, he addressed the critical and scholarly analysis of Squirm:

In my first movie, Squirm (1976), I really didn't try to make any sort of social or political comment. At least not consciously. However, soon after the movie's release, critics found some very profound subtexts which I myself wasn't aware of. Nature getting revenge on man for his disrespect of ecology. The symbolism of man's mortality and his inevitable fate of becoming worm food. Even themes of suppressed sexuality in the main characters. This could all very well be true, but if it is, it was not done purposely on my part.

— Jeff Lieberman, Subversive Horror Cinema: Countercultural Messages of Films from Frankenstein to the Present

== Legacy ==
Director Brian De Palma included a poster of Squirm in several scenes of his 1981 film Blow Out. A fan of De Palma, Lieberman told Fangoria that he asked him about the poster years later. De Palma reportedly answered "Only use the best!"

Musician "Weird Paul" Petroskey created an album titled Worm in My Egg Cream that was dedicated to the scene where Mick orders an egg cream and finds a worm in it. Released on his label Rocks & Rolling Records, all 16 tracks on the album are titled the same as the album.

=== Mystery Science Theater 3000 ===
Squirm was featured on episode #1012 of Mystery Science Theater 3000 (MST3K), a comedy television series in which the character Mike Nelson and his two robot friends Crow T. Robot and Tom Servo are forced to watch bad films as part of an ongoing scientific experiment. The episode was broadcast on the Sci-Fi Channel on August 1, 1999, and was the penultimate episode of the season and of the Sci-Fi Channel era of the show. The episode also included the short film A Case of Spring Fever. MST3K writer / performer Bill Corbett writes, "The thought of yet another movie based in the South ... had me depressed when we started work on this"; however, "the worms provided at least a slightly new take."

Paste writer Jim Vorel ranked the episode #50 (Note: Ranking based on 197 episodes as of 2018.) in his discussion of MST3K's first twelve seasons. He calls Squirm one of the series' "most southern" movies, although he derides the actors' accents, calling them "particularly dreadful." He describes the villains as "smug-as-hell sheriffs and an incomprehensible antagonist whose face is covered with worms." What puts this episode in the top third of MST3K episodes for Vorel is the short, which he describes as "a whimsical, nightmarish trip down the rabbit hole of how terrible existence might be if all the world’s springs suddenly went missing."

The MST3K version of the film was included as part of the Mystery Science Theater 3000, Volume XXXI: The Turkey Day Collection DVD set, released by Shout! Factory on November 25, 2014. Special features included with the episode are the movie's theatrical trailer and an interview with star Don Scardino, "Squirm Talk With Don Scardino". The other episodes in the four-disc set include Jungle Goddess (#203), The Painted Hills (#510), and The Screaming Skull (#912).
