= Patricia Pearcy =

American actress

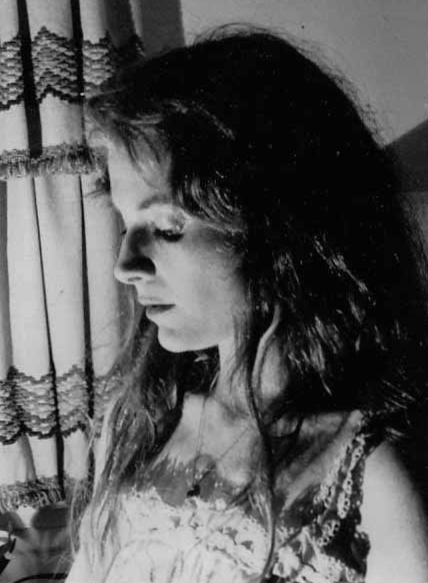
- Pearcy in Squirm (1976)
- Born: Patricia Sue Pearcy; Bell County, Texas, U.S.
- Education: University of Texas at Austin (BFA)
- Occupation: Actress
- Years active: 1971–2009

Patricia Sue Pearcy is an American film, stage, and television actress. She began her career in theatre, appearing on Broadway and in local theatre companies in Connecticut and Kentucky before making her film debut in Monte Hellman's Cockfighter (1974).

She had supporting parts in The Goodbye Girl (1977) and in several television series. She also appeared in several horror films, including Squirm (1976) and Delusion (1981).

== Early life ==
Percy was born in Bell County, Texas, and attended the University of Texas at Austin, where she earned a Bachelor of Fine Arts degree in acting in 1967.

== Career ==
She worked extensively in local theatre in the early 1970s, including at the Long Wharf Theatre in New Haven, Connecticut, where she appeared in productions of Solitaire/Double Solitaire (1971), which was later staged on Broadway at the John Golden Theatre. and also appeared in numerous plays at the Actors Theatre of Louisville, including roles in productions of Tom Stoppard's The Real Inspector Hound and Bertolt Brecht's The Threepenny Opera.

She made her film debut in Monte Hellman's Cockfighter (1974), opposite Warren Oates and Harry Dean Stanton, and then appeared in the creature horror film Squirm (1976). She would appear in several television series, including Starsky and Hutch and The Rockford Files, before having a supporting role in The Goodbye Girl (1977).

== Filmography ==
Year	Title	Role	Notes
1973–1974	One Life to Live	Melinda Cramer Janssen	Recurring
1974	Cockfighter	Mary Elizabeth	Also known as Born to Kill
1976	Squirm	Geraldine 'Geri' Sanders	
1977	Starsky and Hutch	Gail Harcourt	Season 2, Episode 14: 'Bloodbath'
1977	The Rockford Files	Pavarthi	Season 4, Episode 7: 'Quickie Nirvana'
1977	The Goodbye Girl	Rhonda Fontana	
1979	Charleston	Valerie Cross	Television film
1981	Delusion	Meredith Stone	Also known as The House Where Death Lives
1984	T.J. Hooker	Shirley Potter	Season 3, Episode 13: 'The Lipstick Killer'
1984	Little House: Bless All the Dear Children	Elsa Norris	Television film
1995	Texas Justice	Kimberly	Television film
1995	Crystania no densetsu	Old Woman	Voice, (English version)
1996	Tattoon Master	Maureen	Voice, (English version)

== Stage credits ==
Year	Title	Role	Location	Notes
1971	Solitaire/Double Solitaire	Daughter	John Golden Theatre (New York City)	
1972	The Wedding	Nastasya Timofeyevna	Long Wharf Theatre	
1974	Female Transport	Sarah	The Actors Theatre (Louisville, Kentucky)	
1974	Frankenstein	Elizabeth	The Actors Theatre	
1974	Countess Dracula	Laura	The Actors Theatre	
1975	The Real Inspector Hound	Cynthia	The Actors Theatre	
1975	A Flea in Her Ear	Lucienne Homenides de Histangua	The Actors Theatre	
1975	The Threepenny Opera	Dolly	The Actors Theatre	
2009	Long Day's Journey Into Night	Mary	The Off Center Theatre (Austin, Texas)	
