= Jill Fraser (composer) =

American film composer

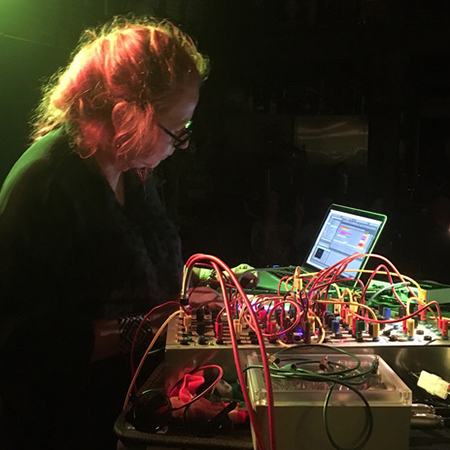
Jill Fraser in performance, 2016

Jill Fraser (born October 11, 1952) is an American composer and electronic music pioneer based in Los Angeles, CA. She is particularly known for her longstanding work using analog modular synthesis systems. Fraser has written both electronic and acoustic music for films, television and TV commercials since the 1970s. She has received Clio awards for her work with Lexus and Adidas.

== Early life ==
Born in Cincinnati, OH, Jill started classical piano training at age 4. In 1962, the family moved to Chapel Hill, NC. While she was still in high school, composer Roger Hannay heard her compositions and allowed her to attend his classes at the University of North Carolina. Fraser went on to earn a Bachelor of Music degree from East Carolina University, where she studied with Otto Henry and composed her first electronic works using a Moog IIIp modular synthesizer system.

At the urging of composer Morton Subotnick, Fraser left North Carolina to attend California Institute of the Arts (CalArts), where she was mentored by both Subotnick and Mel Powell, and attended master classes with John Cage and Lou Harrison. During this time, Fraser composed on the Buchla modular system and worked as an assistant to Morton Subotnick, helping to create voltage control tracks for the composer's original Nonesuch Records release of "A Sky of Cloudless Sulfur."

After receiving her M.F.A. from CalArts in 1978, Fraser began work at Serge Modular Music in Hollywood, where she built her first modular synthesizer system. The first Serge synthesizers had been introduced at CalArts five years earlier by composer/inventor Serge Tcherepnin. Together with Berkeley-based Don Buchla's seminal designs, these modular instruments came to define the "West coast synthesis" approach to electronic music creation, focusing on waveshaper techniques and non-traditional controllers, such as touch plates, rather than the subtractive synthesis and piano-style keyboard controllers characteristic of "East Coast synthesis."

The relatively compact and accessible Serge modular systems were designed to democratize the sonic possibilities provided by the larger, costlier modular systems produced at the time by Buchla, Moog and ARP. Today, Fraser continues to perform and record with classic original Serge modules, along with modern analog and digital electronics. In 2015, she performed with Tcherepnin and other original members of Serge at a 40-year reunion concert held in San Francisco at The Lab.

== Commercials ==
Jill Fraser has written original music for hundreds of TV commercials. Her clients include Lexus, BMW, Honda, Porsche, Nissan, Mazda, Mitsubishi, Suzuki, NBC, Apple, Adidas, Estee Lauder, Baskin Robbins, Yamaha Motorcycles, Bose, Carl's Junior, Hardee's, Mattel, Nike, and National Geographic, among many others. Fraser has been honored with Clio awards for her work with Lexus and Adidas.

== Films ==
Fraser created the electronic sound effects for the cult classics "Zardoz" (1974) starring Sean Connery, and "Empire of the Ants" (1977). She collaborated with Oscar-winning composer Jack Nitzsche to create electronic music for the Paul Schrader film "Hardcore" (starring George C. Scott), as well as William Friedkin's "Cruising" (starring Al Pacino) and "When You Comin’ Back, Red Ryder?".

In 1982, Fraser co-composed the score (with Nitzsche) for the movie "Personal Best," the directorial debut of Oscar-winning screenwriter Robert Towne and the first starring role for Mariel Hemingway. Fraser's score utilized both analog synthesizers and the then-new Fairlight CMI, one of the world's first digital samplers and audio workstations. Controversial at the time of its release due to the film's exploration of physical attraction between same-sex athletic competitors, "Personal Best" is today considered a classic and frequently cited as one of the greatest sports movies of all time.

Fraser also created synthesizer tracks with Buffy Sainte Marie on the score for the film "Spirit of the Wind" and later performed live with Sainte Marie, touring with her Serge modular synthesizer in Canada, Europe and the US. Other film scores from this period include "Reckless and in Love" (starring Meg Foster) and "Cutting Class" (starring Brad Pitt).

== Solo and collaborations ==
In addition to her work for film and television, Fraser's music has been released on several solo and collaborative albums. Her first CD was "Alphabetical Disorders," a collection of synthscapes set to poetry by Ivan E. Roth, released on the pioneering electronic music label Periodic Music in 1988. Fraser's performances with Roth were part of the vibrant Los Angeles punk and spoken word scene curated by Harvey Kubernik, opening for acts such as the Minutemen and Henry Rollins. A collection of Fraser's shorter pieces entitled "Smart Shack" was released in 2015, followed by electronic duets with the zZyzx Society (2018). Fraser released a new album of solo electronic work titled "Earthly Pleasures" on Drag City in September 2024.

== Discography ==
Alphabetical Disorders (with Ivan E. Roth) (1988)
Splashdown, commissioned by Health & Tennis Corporation of America (1988)
Smart Shack (2015)
the zZyzx Society (2018)
Earthly Pleasures (2024)

== Scores ==
“Cutting Class” composer (1988)
“Reckless and in Love” composer (1983)
“Personal Best” composer (1982)
“Hardcore” electronic music (1979)
“Spirit of the Wind” electronic music (1979)
“When You Comin’ Back Red Ryder” electronic music (1979)
