= Donovan Leitch =

Donovan Leitch may refer to:

- Donovan (born 1946), British musician
- Donovan Leitch (actor) (born 1967), his son, actor, former model and documentary filmmaker
