= Rospo Pallenberg =

English screenwriter and film director (b. 1939)

- Born: Robert Pallenberg; 1939 (age 86–87); England
- Occupations: Screenwriter, film director
- Known for: Work with John Boorman

Robert "Rospo" Pallenberg (born 1939) is an English screenwriter and film director. He is best known for his collaborations with John Boorman.

== Early life ==
Pallenberg was born in England in 1939. His father was Corrado Pallenberg (1912–1989), an Italian physician and journalist who worked as a papal medical adviser. He moved to New York City in the 1960s to study architecture, where he met director John Boorman.

== Career ==
While working professionally as an architect, Pallenberg collaborated with Boorman on the screenplay for his unproduced film adaptation of The Lord of the Rings. He was an uncredited script doctor on Deliverance (1972) and Zardoz (1974). He wrote the shooting script for Exorcist II: The Heretic (1977), though due to Writers Guild of America rules he was credited as "Creative Associate". He was also a second unit director, and according to Linda Blair co-directed several scenes with Boorman. He also contributed to the scripts for Crazy Joe (1974, dir. Carlo Lizzani) and Avalanche Express (1979, dir. Mark Robson).

Pallenberg's first credited screenplay was for Boorman's Arthurian fantasy epic Excalibur (1981), which earned him and the director a Hugo Award nomination for Best Dramatic Presentation. He then wrote his 1985 film The Emerald Forest. They had a falling out over Boorman's insistence on casting his own son Charley in the lead role, though they reconciled years later, co-writing scripts about Hadrian and Cú Chulainn.

He directed the 1989 slasher comedy film Cutting Class, starring Brad Pitt in an early role. During the 1990s, he collaborated with Stephen King on a film adaptation of The Stand, which was later retooled into a TV miniseries without his involvement. He wrote an adaptation of Frank Herbert's Dune during the early 1970s, for producer Arthur P. Jacobs.

== Personal life ==
Rospo Pallenberg's wife was Barbara Enes Pallenberg (July 12, 1937 - April 4, 2024), a writer, editor, who ran Sotheby's West Coast office. About a dozen screenplays were co-written by Rospo and Barbara Pallenberg.

== Filmography ==
Year	Title	Director	Notes
1981	Excalibur	John Boorman	Co-wrote with Boorman
1985	The Emerald Forest	John Boorman	
1989	Cutting Class	Himself	Directorial debut
1998	The Barber of Siberia	Nikita Mikhalkov	Co-wrote with Mikhalkov and Rustam Ibragimbekov
2001	Druids	Jacques Dorfmann	Wrote story, screenplay by Dorfmann and Norman Spinrad

=== Uncredited script contributions ===
Year	Title	Director	Notes
1972	Deliverance	John Boorman	Script doctor
1974	Crazy Joe	Carlo Lizzani	Script doctor
1974	Zardoz	John Boorman	Script doctor
1977	Exorcist II: The Heretic	John Boorman	Also second unit director
1979	Avalanche Express	Mark Robson	Script doctor

== Unproduced scripts ==
- The Lord of the Rings (early-to-mid-1970s) - Adaptation of J. R. R. Tolkien novel, for producers Gabriel Katzka, David Picker, and Arnold Picker. Co-written with and intended to be directed by John Boorman.
- Dune (early-to-mid-1970s) - Adaptation of Frank Herbert novel, for producer Arthur P. Jacobs. Haskell Wexler was attached to direct, with Susan Hampshire, John Neville and Patrick McGoohan attached to star.
- Hadrian (mid-2000s) - Biopic of 1st-century Roman Emperor, co-written with John Boorman.
- Cú Chulainn (c. 2015) - Fantasy film based on Irish mythological hero, co-written with John Boorman.
