= Robert Machray =

Robert Machray may refer to:

- Robert Machray (bishop) (1831–1904), Scottish-born Anglican bishop and missionary
- Robert Machray (actor) (1945–2025), American actor
