= John Merritt (editor) =

John Merritt (1920–1999) was a British film and television editor, writer, and director. He was born on 9 June 1920 in London. He died at the age of 79 on 6 July 1999 in Bristol, England. While John Merritt has a list of 20 credits on IMDb in all three of the categories listed above, he is most famous for his work as an editor.

== Notable works ==
Merritt's first major work came in 1963 on John Boorman's 5 part docuseries Citizen 63 (1963) this series was produced by BBC West, and followed five British individuals "as they confronted and conformed to the problems and pressures of everyday life in Britain in 1963." According to the book "The Cinema of John Boorman" this docu series was "the most popular and influential of Boorman's BBC projects." This early work helped Merritt to cultivate a good relationship with Boorman. Merritt would go on to work with Boorman on some of his most famous films, the first being the now infamous cult classic Zardoz (1974). After working on Zardoz with Boorman, Merritt was hired by Boorman again to the editorial crew of Exorcist II: The Heretic, the sequel to one of the most famous horror movies of all time The Exorcist. Apparently Boorman was happy with Merritt's work as he hired him again four years later as the head editor for his retelling of the legend of King Arthur and the knights of the Round Table, Excalibur. This film was based on the 15th-century Arthurian romance Le Morte d'Arthur by Thomas Malory. While Excalibur did not do very well with critics, The New York Times said it "lumbers along" and "accumulates no momentum." it has done quite well with audiences as it currently has 80% on Rotten Tomatoes. While John Merritt is not widely known, his working repeatedly with celebrated writer/director John Boorman is a statement to his great skill in the editorial field.

== Filmography ==
=== Editor ===
Excalibur (1981)

The Lively Arts (TV Series documentary) (1 episode)

- But Still We Sing (1979)

In Deepest Britain (TV Series documentary) (1 episode) (1978)

-Web of the Waterways (1978)

Sea Tales: The Return (TV Mini-Series) (1 episode) (1977)

-Miss Barraclough (1977)

Exorcist II: The Heretic (uncredited) (1977)

Demolition Man (TV Movie) (film editor) (1975)

Country Tales (1 episode) (1975)

-The Gallops Man (1975)

A Secret Place (1974)

Zardoz (1974)

The French Way (3 episodes) (1972)

-Desastre, Catastrophe, Cataclysme, Apocalypse (1972)

-The Blacksmith, the Baker, the Black Pudding Maker (1972)

-Goosey, Goosey, Gander (1972)

Sunday Night (TV Series documentary) (1 episode) (1966)

-The Quarry: Portrait of a Man as a Paralysed Artist (1966)

Grass Roots (TV Mini-Series) (1965)

The Newcomers (TV Mini-Series documentary) (5 episodes) (1964)

-Waiting (1964)

-A Celebration (1964)

-Out There in the Night (1964)

-The Good Life (1964)

-The Beginning (1964)

Citizen 63 (TV Series documentary) (4 episodes) (1963)

-Frank George (1963)

-Marion Knight (1963)

-Richard Callicott (1963)

-Barry Langford (1963)

In View (TV Series documentary) (2 episodes) (1962)

-The Big Stride (1962)

-Six Days to Saturday (1962)

Look (TV Series documentary) (3 episodes) (1958-1959)

-Seaquaria (1959)

-South of the Roaring Forties (1959)

-The Story of a Hyena (1958)

The Angel Who Pawned Her Harp (1954)

The Atomic Bomb: Its Effects and How to Meet Them (Documentary short) (1952)

Road Sense (Documentary short) (1951)

Mrs. Worth Goes to Westminster (Short) (1949)

=== Director ===
Ten Years On (TV Series documentary) (1 episode) (1973)

-The Set (1973)

Grass Roots (TV Mini-Series) (1 episode) (1965)

=== Writer ===
Ten Years On (TV Series documentary) (narrative script - 1 episode)

(1973)- The Set (1973) ... (narrative script)
