= Katrine Boorman =

English actress

- Born: 6 August 1960 (age 65); Hampshire, England
- Years active: 1974–present
- Parent: John Boorman
- Relatives: Charley Boorman

Katrine Boorman is an English actress and director of film, television, voice and stage since 1974. She is the daughter of British actor-filmmaker John Boorman.

== Biography ==
Boorman was born to British film director John Boorman and his first wife Christel Kruse Boorman. They had four children. The family spent the early years of her life in County Wicklow in Ireland, but after John and Christel divorced, the children and their mother left that area, while John remarried and started another family.

Boorman gradually became a greater presence in her father's life as she took parts in his films.

== Selected filmography ==
- Zardoz (1974; uncredited)
- Excalibur (1981)
- Marche à l'ombre (1984)
- Hope and Glory (1987)
- Camille Claudel (1988)
- French Twist (1995)
- Hanging Around (1996)
- Pédale douce (1996)
- Cash in Hand (1998)
- I, Cesar (2003)
- Marie Antoinette (2006)

== Television ==
- Jemima Shore Investigates (1983)
- Bordertown (1990)

== Director and producer ==
- Boogie Woogie (2009, assistant director and assistant producer)
- Me and Me Dad (2012 documentary, director and producer)

== Sources ==
- Katrine Boorman at IMDb
