= Nancy Boy (album) =

Studio album by Nancy Boy
- Released: 1996
- Genre: Pop
- Label: Sire
- Producer: Shel Talmy

Nancy Boy chronology
Promosexual (1995)	Nancy Boy (1996)

Nancy Boy is the second album by the American band Nancy Boy, released in 1996. The original title was Automaker. It was a commercial failure.

A video was produced for "Johnny Chrome & Silver", which was also a radio hit in several countries. "Deep Sleep Motel" was released as a single; Roman Coppola directed the video. The band supported the album with a North American tour.

== Production ==
The album was produced by Shel Talmy; the band wanted to create an album that did not resemble grunge music. "W.R.I.P." is an homage to the radio station WRIF. Guitar player Jason Nesmith sings lead on "Colors".

== Critical reception ==
Professional ratings
Review scores
Source	Rating
AllMusic	3.5/5 stars
The Evening Post	2/4 stars
The Guardian	1/5 stars
MusicHound Rock: The Essential Album Guide	.5/5 stars
Waikato Times	3/5 stars

The Guardian wrote that "the music, swollen with synthesisers and tinny guitar, renders the lyrics even more spoiled-brattish than they already are." The Indianapolis Star praised the "vivacious hooks and pop melodies modeled after '70s glam-rockers David Bowie, T-Rex and the Sweet." The Waikato Times concluded that the band has "got impeccable breeding, a great concept, but not enough new ideas to really do the damage."

The Record determined that the band "takes its cue from Blur's retro-friendly smash of a couple years ago, Parklife, with lots of Bowie-isms and stylistic flourishes." The Los Angeles Times admired Nesmith, and wrote that the album is "an affectionate homage, delivered with heart and spirit, and enough sense of perspective to avoid both pretension and camp." City Pages stated that Nancy Boy "bridges and celebrates those times when men wanted to look like women, and everyone seemed to want to be robots (hence synthpop, breakdancing, and bad man-made fabrics)."

AllMusic wrote that "Nancy Boy melds a glamorous, witty image to some fun, concise pop songs."

== Track listing ==
No.	Title	Length
1.	"Deep Sleep Motel"
2.	"Can You Dig It?"
3.	"Johnny Chrome & Silver"
4.	"Sometimes"
5.	"Colors"
6.	"Foxtrot"
7.	"Rocking Chair"
8.	"Dearest Girl"
9.	"I Don't Mind"
10.	"Mother's Ruin"
11.	"W.R.I.P."
12.	"Ultrasex"
13.	"You Deserve a Place"
