= Paul Geoffrey =

American actor (1955–2023)

- Born: 12 February 1955; Surrey, England
- Died: 3 June 2023 (aged 68); Santa Fe, New Mexico, U.S.
- Occupation: Actor
- Notable work: Excalibur
- Spouse: Sue Taylor

Paul John Geoffrey (12 February 1955 – 3 June 2023) was a British-American actor, known for his roles in the films Excalibur (1981), Greystoke: The Legend of Tarzan, Lord of the Apes (1984), and Emily Brontë's Wuthering Heights (1992). He also had roles in the film The Thomas Crown Affair (1999), the series The Manageress (1989–1990), and the miniseries Napoleon and Josephine: A Love Story (1987).

== Biography ==
Geoffrey was born in Surrey, England, on 12 February 1955. In the early 1990s, he moved to Santa Fe in the United States. He played Perceval in Excalibur. Geoffrey died from cancer in Santa Fe, on 3 June 2023, at the age of 68.
