= The Emerald Forest =

1985 film by John Boorman

- Directed by: John Boorman
- Written by: Rospo Pallenberg
- Produced by: John Boorman; Michael Dryhurst; Edgar Gross
- Starring: Powers Boothe; Meg Foster; Charley Boorman
- Cinematography: Philippe Rousselot
- Music by: Brian Gascoigne; Junior Homrich
- Production company: Christel Films
- Distributed by: Embassy Films Associates (through Rank Film Distributors)
- Release dates: 3 July 1985 (United States); 23 August 1985 (United Kingdom)
- Running time: 114 minutes
- Countries: United Kingdom; Brazil
- Languages: English; Portuguese
- Budget: $15 million
- Box office: $24,468,550 (U.S. and Canada)

The Emerald Forest is a 1985 British adventure drama film set in the Brazilian rainforest, directed by John Boorman, written by Rospo Pallenberg, and starring Powers Boothe, Meg Foster, and Charley Boorman with supporting roles by Rui Polanah, Tetchie Agbayani, Dira Paes, Estee Chandler, and Eduardo Conde.

The film tells the story of an American boy who is kidnapped by an indigenous tribe in the Amazon jungle. It is allegedly based on a true story, although the accuracy of this claim has been disputed. The film was screened out of competition at the 1985 Cannes Film Festival, where it was chosen as the closing film. In promoting the film for awards competition, Boorman created the first Oscar screeners, but the film received no Academy Award nominations.

== Plot summary ==
Bill Markham is an engineer who has moved to Brazil with his family to work on a large hydro-electric dam. The film opens on Markham, his wife Jean, his young son Tommy, and his daughter Heather having a picnic on the edge of the jungle, which is being cleared for the dam's construction. Tommy wanders from the cleared area, and an Indian from one of the indigenous tribes known as the Invisible People notices Tommy and takes him. Markham pursues the pair into the forest but does not find his son.

Ten years later, the dam is nearing completion. A 17-year-old Tommy, now called Tomme, has become one of the Invisible People. When his father, Chief Wanadi, the man who took and adopted Tommy, notices Tomme is now smitten with girls, he initiates Tomme's coming-of-age rite, after which Tomme undergoes a vision quest. Tomme's spirit animal tells him he must retrieve sacred stones from a remote spot deep in the jungle. Wanadi warns him that the quest will be dangerous, as it will take him into the territory of the cannibalistic Fierce People.

Meanwhile, Markham has finally identified his son's abductors. Markham and journalist Uwe Werner decide to set off bottle rockets to attract the attention of the Invisible People. Instead, they attract the Fierce People and are captured. Armed with a CAR-15 carbine, Markham is able to defend himself long enough to talk with Chief Jacareh who releases Markham for the night, promising to hunt him down in the morning, while the Fierce People kill and butcher the journalist. Close to dawn, Markham stumbles into Tomme collecting the sacred stones. The two recognize each other just as the Fierce People arrive, striking Markham in the arm with an arrow. Tomme and his father manage to escape, leaving Markham's carbine behind. In the care of the Invisible People, Markham recovers from his injuries and discovers that his son has chosen a wife, a young woman named Kachiri.

Jacareh, recognizing the destructive power of Markham's carbine, visits a seedy brothel at the edge of the construction zone and arranges to exchange women for ammunition and more guns.

Wanadi presides over the wedding, with Markham seated in honour next to the chief; Markham watches as Tomme and Kachiri are wedded; he is still grief-stricken, even still upset with Wanadi, for his son being taken; Markham asks Chief Wanadi why he took Tommy all those years ago. Wanadi answers that he had thought the white people must be terribly unhappy, since they were destroying the forest, but Tommy had smiled at the Invisible People when he saw them; the Chief says he had taken Tommy to save him.

Wanadi gives Markham the herb to instigate Markham's own vision quest, and he wakes up back at the dam's construction zone.

Tomme and his friends return to their village to discover that many of the Invisible People have been murdered and all the young women abducted by the Fierce People. Tracking the Fierce People, they find their women inside a building protected by unfamiliar, and deadly, technology. In the ensuing battle, the Fierce People kill several members of the Invisible People, including Chief Wanadi. Desperate for help, Tomme navigates the city to his parents' condo, and Markham agrees to help rescue the women from the brothel.

That night, Markham initiates a shootout in the brothel while Tomme and his friends release the enslaved women from captivity. The Fierce Ones arrive to fight the Invisible People, but are defeated with Markham killing Chief Jacareh. Tomme is later sworn in as the new chief of the tribe. Markham warns Tomme that the almost-completed dam will end the tribe's way of life, but Tomme insists that the Invisible People are safe and they will ask the wildlife to bring on sufficient rain to break the dam. Markham does not trust that the dam can be broken with any amount of water that the animals can bring, so he decides to "help" the cause and destroy the dam himself. During the storm, Markham places demolition explosives at key points along the dam, but just as the detonator fails from a falling piece of equipment, the water breaches and destroys the dam, just as Tomme had insisted could happen. Markham watches its destruction with mixed emotions.

The film ends with Tomme and Kachiri sitting at the swimming hole near their village in the jungle, watching the members of their tribe splash about and play.

== Cast ==
- Powers Boothe as Bill Markham
- Meg Foster as Jean Markham
- Charley Boorman as Tomme/Tommy Markham
  - William Rodriguez as Young Tommy Markham
- Estee Chandler as Heather Markham
  - Yara Vaneau as Young Heather Markham
- Dira Paes as Kachiri
- Eduardo Conde as Uwe Werner
- Ariel Coelho as Padre Leduc
- Peter Marinker as Perreira
- Mario Borges as Costa
- Átila Iório as Trader
- Gabriel Archanjo as Trader's Henchman
- Gracindo Júnior as Carlos
- Arthur Muhlenberg as Rico
- Chico Terto as Paulo
- Claudio Moreno as Jacareh

=== Invisible Tribe ===
- Rui Polanah as Wanadi
- Maria Helena Velasco as Uluru
- Tetchie Agbayani as Caya
- Paulo Vinicius as Mapi
- Aloiso Flores as Samanpo
- Joao Mauricio Ca as Monkey
- Isabel Bicudo as Kachiri's cousin
- Patricia Prisco as Kachiri's cousin
- Silvana de Faria as Pequi

== Production ==
Dira Paes was chosen after an audition in which she took advantage because she answered the casting director in English. Even counting as experience only the plays she performed at school, she had already shown herself to be professional enough to forget what the word "modesty" means. "I am naked all the time, with a G-string, but with breasts and buttocks exposed. I was 15 and I had my 16th birthday on the last day of shooting. I was a girl and I have that as a reminder of the time I was still a virgin. But it wasn't hard to do, because everyone was Indian and naked. It wasn't great, but it was good to be uninhibited," she said.

== Reception ==
=== Box office ===
The film made its worldwide debut in France on 25 June 1985, where its recent Cannes buzz made it a sizeable hit. With 2,652,685 admissions nationwide, including 711,929 in Greater Paris, it was the 12th most popular film of the year in the country, and the 10th most popular in the capital region.
In the United States, The Emerald Forest opened on 5 July 1985 via independent distributor Embassy Pictures, on a moderate 1,110 screens. It finished its run at the local box office with $24,468,550.
The film opened in its native UK on 23 August 1985, in second place, but quickly fell off the charts, only drawing a lackluster £913,000 domestically.

=== Critical ===
On review aggregator Rotten Tomatoes, 84% of 19 critics gave the film a positive review, with an average rating of 7.2/10. The Emerald Forest was designated a Critics' Pick by a New York Times reviewer, who called it "compelling and richly atmospheric". Derek Malcolm of The Guardian wrote, "This simplicity of expression, combined with Boorman's usual sophisticated visual technique, makes it a genuine oddity. But, whatever its faults, it looks glorious, tells a fascinating story and is a piece of sheer cinema you have to see." In a negative review, Paul Attanasio of The Washington Post called it "long, wheezy tribute to the Noble Savage" and more of "a National Geographic special" than a proper film.

=== Accolades ===
In addition to its Cannes selection, The Emerald Forest received three nominations at the 39th BAFTA Awards, for Best Cinematography (Philippe Rousselot), Best Original Music (Junior Homrich and Brian Gascoigne) and Best Makeup and Hair (Peter Frampton, Paul Engelen, Anna Dryhurst, Luis Michelotti and Beth Presares).

== Inspiration ==
The film was promoted as "based on a true story". Critic Harlan Ellison in his book Harlan Ellison's Watching wrote that attempts by SCAN to get background information on the real story revealed that Rospo Pallenberg's original screenplay was based on several stories, including an article in the Los Angeles Times about a Peruvian labourer whose child had been abducted by a local Indian tribe and located sixteen years later almost fully assimilated. Pallenberg's agent told SCAN that while director John Boorman had said that he read the original L.A. Times article, in fact, he had not, but was simply working from Pallenberg's screenplay. According to SCAN, Boorman told NPR's All Things Considered that the son was still living with the tribe in 1985, and identified the tribe as "the Mayoruna", yet detailed anthropological studies of that tribe do not mention an adopted outsider.

A possible additional source for The Emerald Forest is the book Wizard of the Upper Amazon (1971). The story is an autobiographical account of Manuel Córdova-Rios’ kidnapping when he was a teenager working for rubber cutters in the Amazon in the early 1900s. He was taken by a group of Native Amazonians to their remote Indian village. These Amazonians were fiercely independent and had fled into the interior because they refused to live under the subservient conditions imposed by the rubber barons at that time. Cordova-Rios was incorporated into their tribe and describes a life strikingly similar to the one depicted in The Emerald Forest.

Contrary to Ellison's conclusion, a contemporaneous January 1985 review in Variety magazine states up front that the movie is "[b]ased on an uncredited true story about a Peruvian whose son disappeared in the jungles of Brazil." The Los Angeles Times article also mentioned that the Peruvian child had at the time decided as an adult to stay with his adoptive tribe.

== First Oscar screeners ==
Because Embassy Pictures was struggling in the year of Emerald Forest's release, the film did not receive a traditional "For Your Consideration" advertising campaign for the 1985 Academy Awards. Boorman took the initiative to promote the film himself by making VHS copies available for no charge to Academy members at several Los Angeles-area video rental stores. Boorman's idea later became ubiquitous during Hollywood's award season, and by the 2010s, more than a million Oscar screeners were mailed to Academy members each year. However, Emerald Forest itself received no nominations from Boorman's strategy.

== See also ==
- List of films featuring hallucinogens
- Tucuruí Dam
