= Cutting Class =

1989 American dark comedy slasher film by Rospo Pallenberg

- VHS cover
- Directed by: Rospo Pallenberg
- Written by: Steve Slavkin
- Produced by: Donald R. Beck; Rudy Cohen
- Starring: Donovan Leitch; Jill Schoelen; Brad Pitt; Roddy McDowall; Martin Mull
- Cinematography: Avraham Karpick
- Edited by: Bill Butler; Natan Zahavi
- Music by: Jill Fraser
- Production companies: April Films; Gower Street Pictures
- Distributed by: Republic Pictures Home Video
- Release date: December 13, 1989
- Running time: 91 minutes
- Country: United States
- Language: English

Cutting Class is a 1989 American black comedy slasher film directed by Rospo Pallenberg in his directorial debut, written by Steve Slavkin, and starring Donovan Leitch, Jill Schoelen, Brad Pitt, Roddy McDowall, and Martin Mull. It was Pitt's second major role, after The Dark Side of the Sun.

The film was released direct-to-video by Republic Pictures on December 13, 1989.

== Plot ==
A paperboy delivers a newspaper to the house of District Attorney Bill Carson, who has planned a hunting trip. He warns his teenage daughter Paula to do her homework, not to allow boys in the house, and most importantly not to cut class. Paula then puts the newspaper in the bin, showing its headline: "Boy who killed father released from Mental Asylum."

Bill Carson drives to the swamps for his hunting trip. As he takes shots into the air, someone hiding nearby holds a bow and arrows. The mysterious figure fires an arrow into Bill, who cries out and falls down to the ground. Struggling to get help, Bill starts crawling his way back home.

Meanwhile, teenager Dwight Ingalls enters class late after avoiding an accident on his ride to school. he arrives to class late and when questioned by his science teacher, Mr. Conklin classmates give him the answers.

Later, Paula and her friend Colleen take out gym equipment. Paula walks past a set of bows and arrows and notices a leaf hanging off one of the arrows. Paula picks the leaf off. Meanwhile, student Brian Woods, the boy who was released from the mental asylum, is told to climb a rope by P.E. coach Harris, but Dwight causes him to fall. Meanwhile, the art teacher, Mr. Quint, is murdered after being locked in a kiln by an unknown assailant.

At a hot dog stand, Colleen, Paula, and student Gary wait for Dwight. Brian approaches, and Colleen insults him before asserting that he has a crush on Paula. Dwight then pulls up in his car and starts talking to Paula. He asks to go to her house, as Bill is away, which would give them a chance to be alone. Dwight then goes to buy Paula a hot dog but is beaten by Brian who hands her one. Dwight tells Paula to get in the car and makes it clear to Brian that they are not friends anymore and to leave him and Paula alone. They all then drive off in Dwight's car.

Brian and Paula nevertheless become friends, and she starts to trust him. Dwight warns her to stay away from him. Meanwhile, students Gary and Colleen are murdered under the bleachers during a basketball game, in which Dwight is participating in for a scholarship. Dwight and Brian have a conversation and discuss the time as teens they worked on Brian's late father's car. Brian describes how they took a part out and did not put it back in. Dwight gets angry and says they will not have another encounter like that. Vice Principal Knocht is murdered in the copy room, and Dwight notices that the killer made copies of the killing on the copy machine. Knocht's face is shown smashed into the copy machine glass along with a ring on the killer's finger. The ring belongs to Dwight. Brian shows Paula the picture and tells her Dwight is the killer instead of Brian.

Brian tries to kill Paula, Dwight, and their math teacher, Mr. Glynn, and school janitor Schultz happens to be around at the time. Every classroom they run into, Brian starts talking to Paula and Glynn through the PA in the principal's office. Still thinking that Dwight is the killer, Paula runs from him. Brian goes into the classroom after hacking Glynn to death. Dwight enters and gets Brian off of Paula, and they run out to the shop class and hide after Brian exclaims, "YOU'RE A YANKEE DOODLE DANDY TOO; YOU TOO MUST KILL OR DIE!" Brian knows they are in there, and follows them while locking them in and turning on all the equipment.

Brian corners Dwight and puts his head in a vice and points a drill towards his face. Paula ends up striking Brian in the head with a claw hammer, making him fall onto a moving saw, which goes into his back as Paula rescues Dwight. They leave the school and are in Dwight's car when they see Bill falling down a hill into the road. However, Dwight cannot stop because Brian cut the brakes earlier. They swerve and miss hitting Bill, who responds, "Shouldn't you be in school? You're not cutting class, I hope!". Paula tells her dad Brian is dead.

== Cast ==
- Donovan Leitch as Brian Woods
- Jill Schoelen as Paula Carson
- Brad Pitt as Dwight Ingalls
- Roddy McDowall as Mr. Dante
- Martin Mull as William Carson III
- Brenda James as Colleen (as Brenda Lynn Klemme)
- Mark Barnet as Gary
- Tom Ligon as Mr. Ingalls
- Robert Glaudini as Shultz
- Eric Boles as Mr. Glynn
- Dirk Blocker as Coach Harris
- Nancy Fish as Mrs. Knocht
- Robert Machray as Mr. Conklin
- David Clarke as Crusty Old Man
- Norman Alden as Officer Fondulac

== Production ==
Cutting Class marked the first major role for Brad Pitt in a feature film being third billed in the credits after having previously done mostly television work. Pitt began a relationship with co-star Jill Schoelen with the two dating for about three months.

== Reception ==
The film was received negatively by critics. It has an approval rating of 14% on the review aggregator website Rotten Tomatoes, based on seven reviews.

Felix Vasquez Jr. of Film Threat wrote, "Pallenberg's creaky slasher film is one that you'll either love or hate, and while many will opt for the latter, it's good campy fun with some of the dumbest scenes you can grab from a slasher of this decade."
