= Personal Best (film) =

1982 American drama film by Robert Towne

- Theatrical release poster
- Directed by: Robert Towne
- Written by: Robert Towne
- Produced by: Robert Towne
- Starring: Mariel Hemingway; Scott Glenn; Patrice Donnelly; Kenny Moore
- Cinematography: Michael Chapman
- Edited by: Jacqueline Cambas; Jere Huggins; Ned Humphreys; Walt Mulconery; Bud S. Smith
- Music by: Jack Nitzsche; Jill Fraser
- Production company: The Geffen Company
- Distributed by: Warner Bros.
- Release date: February 5, 1982
- Running time: 124 minutes
- Country: United States
- Language: English
- Budget: $15 million
- Box office: $5.7 million

Personal Best is a 1982 American drama film written, produced and directed by Robert Towne in his directional debut. It stars Mariel Hemingway as track runner Chris Cahill and real-life track star Patrice Donnelly as fellow runner Tory Skinner, along with Scott Glenn as their coach Terry Tingloff. The film is about the lesbian relationship between two track-and-field teammates whose relationship might interfere with their performance.

The film was shot in California and Oregon. Several issues arose during production, including a strike by the Screen Actors Guild and a $110 million lawsuit.

The film received positive reviews after its release. Both Gene Siskel and Roger Ebert placed Personal Best on their lists of the ten best films of 1982. It garnered a 74% approval rating at review aggregator Rotten Tomatoes. Despite its popularity with film critics, the film did not succeed at the box office.

== Plot ==
Chris Cahill and Tory Skinner are two young women who compete in track-and-field. Chris is upset about her difficulty reaching her potential, while Tory is calm. After Chris faints in a bar, Tory drives her home, and they become friends. Tory consoles Chris when she is distressed. After a while, they have sex and fall in love.

Coach Terry Tingloff, who is very upset, says Chris can train on his team, but at first he refuses to teach her. Later, Tory successfully persuades Tingloff to let Chris compete in the trials. The team learns that they will compete for a chance at the 1980 Summer Olympics in Moscow. Tingloff gets enraged because Tory asks to not finish the last two events in a race. She wants to help Chris, who is sick, but Chris wants to perform. Chris criticizes Tingloff for his treatment of Tory.

Tingloff promises Chris a room, board, and tuition for the next year. However, she would have to stay with him during the summer. At first, she accepts the offer, but she changes her mind. The women decide to skip a pentathlon to train at home. Tingloff becomes impressed with Chris's improvement. Chris becomes excited about her higher ranks.

During an argument on their way to practice, Tory and Chris almost break up over how much they worry about each other. While practicing a high jump, Chris dislocates her knee. Tory confesses to moving the mark while showing her how to lengthen her approach in order to lower her center of gravity. This enrages Tingloff.

While Chris is undergoing treatment for her leg, Tingloff apologizes for his anger and tells her to stay at his house. Tingloff gets enraged because he thinks Tory and Chris's relationship is damaging their performance. He intentionally provokes Chris to get her angry in order to make her hit him. Tingloff keeps Tory and Chris from appearing on the field at the same time. Chris becomes friends with a professional swimmer named Denny Stiles and they start a relationship.

At the US Olympic trials, Tory injures her knee, and Chris tells her to keep going if she wants to make the team. Tory, Chris, and another competitor, Pooch Anderson, make the team. However, they will not go to Moscow due to the United States boycott. Tory is happy that Chris is dating Denny. The movie ends with the three teammates on the podium.

== Cast ==
- Mariel Hemingway as Chris Cahill
- Scott Glenn as Terry Tingloff
- Patrice Donnelly as Tory Skinner
- Kenny Moore as Denny Stiles
- Jim Moody as Roscoe Travis
- Larry Pennell as Rick Cahill
- Luana Anders as Rita Cahill
- George de la Pena as Raoul

== Production ==
Mariel Hemingway trained extensively before the film began shooting.

Many of the scenes were filmed in San Luis Obispo County, California. While the sign on the track shows "Cal Poly" (California Polytechnic State University, San Luis Obispo, a university in San Luis Obispo), it was filmed at the track at Morro Bay High School. Two scenes were filmed at restaurants in downtown San Luis Obispo: the Cigar Factory and 1865. Filming also occurred in Eugene, Oregon. Locations included Hayward Field and the Track Town Pizza restaurant.

The production was halted in July 1980 because of a strike by the Screen Actors Guild.

Towne clashed with producer David Geffen during the production. He later sued Geffen and others for $110 million.

Although Michael Chapman is listed as the sole director of photography, Reynaldo Villalobos and Caleb Deschanel did uncredited work.

== Reception ==
=== Critical response ===
Personal Best garnered a 74% approval rating at review aggregator Rotten Tomatoes based on 34 reviews. Metacritic, which uses a weighted average, assigned the film a score of 71 out of 100, based on 13 critics, indicating "generally favorable" reviews. Roger Ebert gave the film four out of a possible four stars and wrote, "This is a very physical movie, one of the healthiest and sweatiest celebrations of physical exertion I can remember... It is filled with the uncertainties, risks, cares, and rewards of real life, and it considers its characters' hearts and minds, and sees their sexuality as an expression of their true feelings for each other". Both Gene Siskel and Roger Ebert placed Personal Best on their lists of the ten best films of 1982. Pauline Kael wrote that "There has probably never been a growing-up story presented on the screen so freely and uninhibitedly." Vincent Canby of The New York Times praised the acting of the four leads, but criticized the storyline and the "prettified slow-motion footage." Stanley Kauffmann of The New Republic described Personal Best as "tedious".

In April 2024 it was selected by Britain's The Observer newspaper as one of their "20 best sports movies".

=== Box office ===
Personal Best did well in its initial limited engagement, but ultimately flopped at the box office.

=== Accolades ===
The film is recognized by American Film Institute in these lists:

- 2008: AFI's 10 Top 10:
  - Nominated Sports Film

== See also ==
- List of films about the sport of athletics
