= Robert Machray (actor) =

American stage and television actor (1945–2025)

- Born: Robert Machray Ward; May 4, 1945; San Diego, California, U.S.
- Died: January 12, 2025 (aged 79); North Hollywood, California, U.S.
- Occupations: Stage and television actor
- Years active: 1977–2011
- Spouse: Luigi Camperchioli

Robert Machray Ward (May 4, 1945 – January 12, 2025) was an American stage and television actor. He was best known for playing the recurring role of Fire Marshal Dobbins in the American sitcom television series Cheers.

== Life and career ==
Machray was born in San Diego, California. His stage career included numerous major roles at Shakespeare festivals, and major roles with companies such as the Los Angeles Civic Light Opera, Hartford Stage and Playwrights Horizons. He began his screen career in 1977, appearing in the television film Panic in Echo Park. He then appeared in the ABC sitcom television series Operation Petticoat.

Machray guest-starred in television programs including Roseanne, Life Goes On, The Drew Carey Show, Suddenly Susan, Profiler and Three's Company, and played the recurring role of Fire Marshal Dobbins in the NBC sitcom television series Cheers. He also appeared in two films: Cutting Class (as Mr. Conklin) and The Master of Disguise. In 1983, he was cast in a summer stage production of My Fair Lady, and in 1991, he appeared in the stage play A Passenger Train of Sixty-One Coaches.

Machray retired from acting in 2011, last appearing in the NBC satirical television mockumentary sitcom Parks and Recreation.

== Personal life and death ==
Machray lived in North Hollywood, Los Angeles, with his husband Luigi Camperchioli.

Machray died of complications from dementia and two strokes at his home on January 12, 2025, at the age of 79.
