= John Boorman =

British filmmaker (born 1933)

Sir John Boorman CBE
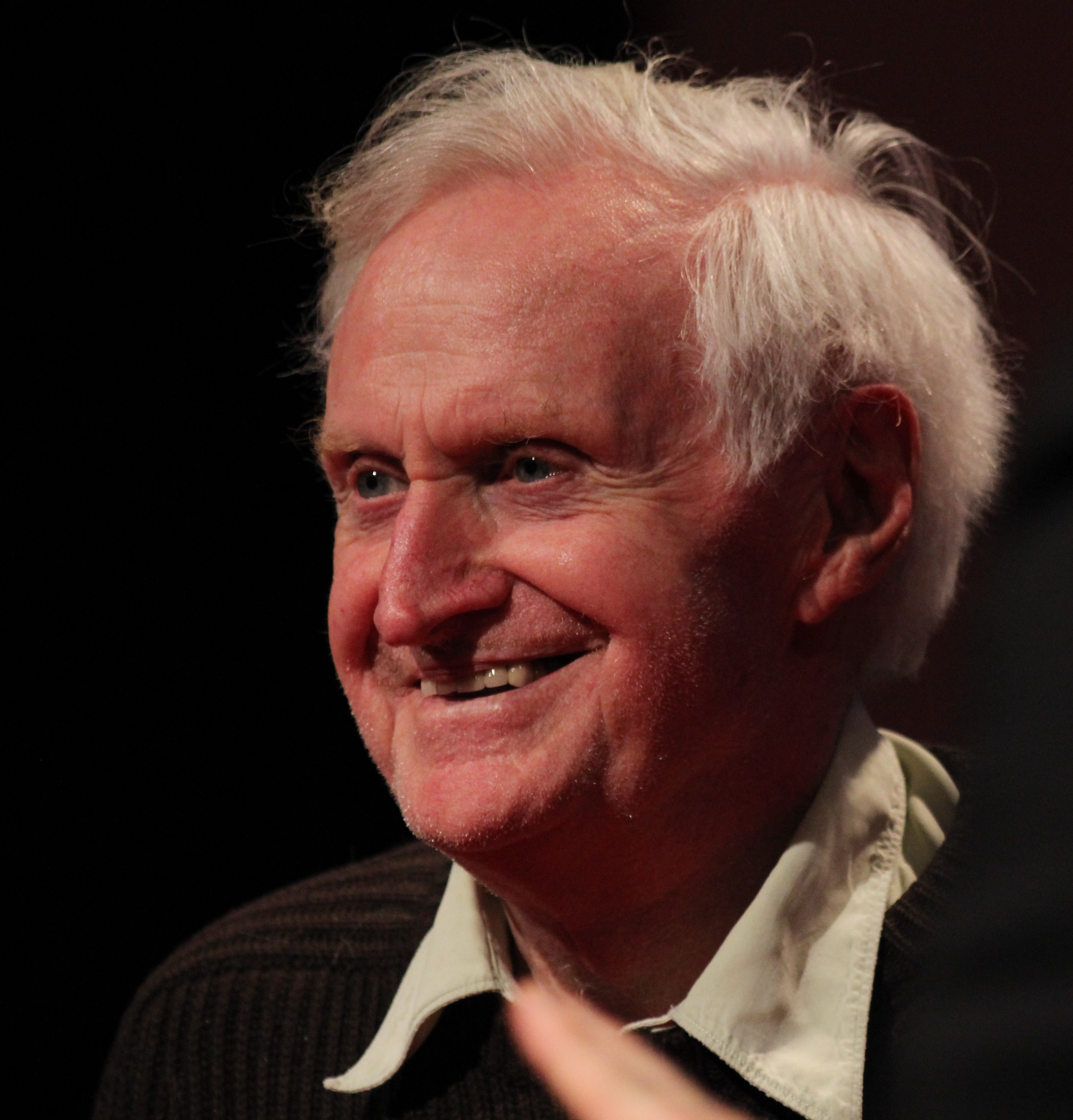
- Boorman in Paris in November 2014
- Born: 18 January 1933 (age 93); Shepperton, Middlesex, England
- Occupations: Film director; screenwriter; producer
- Years active: 1962–present
- Spouses: Christel Kruse (m. 1956–1990) Isabella Weibrecht (m. 1995, divorced)
- Children: 7 (1 deceased), including Charley Boorman and Katrine Boorman

Sir John Boorman (/ˈbʊərmən/; born 18 January 1933) is a British filmmaker. He is best known for directing feature films such as Point Blank (1967), Hell in the Pacific (1968), Deliverance (1972), Zardoz (1974), Exorcist II: The Heretic (1977), Excalibur (1981), The Emerald Forest (1985), Hope and Glory (1987), The General (1998), The Tailor of Panama (2001) and Queen and Country (2014).

Boorman has directed over 20 films and he has received five Academy Award nominations, twice for Best Director (for Deliverance, and Hope and Glory); two British Academy Film Award nominations; three Golden Globe Award nominations; and he won the Cannes Film Festival's Best Director Award twice, in 1970 and 1998. He is also credited with creating the first Academy Award screeners to promote The Emerald Forest. In 2004, Boorman received the BAFTA Fellowship for lifetime achievement from the British Academy of Film and Television Arts. In the 2022 New Year Honours, he received a knighthood from Queen Elizabeth II for services to film. Point Blank and Deliverance have been included in the United States' National Film Registry.

== Life and career ==
=== Early years and education ===
Boorman was born in Shepperton, Middlesex, England, the son of pub landlord George Boorman and his wife, Ivy (née Chapman), daughter of another pub owner in the East End of London. George Boorman was of Dutch parentage; he served as a captain in the British Indian Army during World War I, and later worked for the founder of Shell Oil. Boorman's paternal grandfather, an inventor, "made and lost several fortunes during his lifetime". Although not Roman Catholic, after failing the eleven-plus he was sent to be educated at the Salesian School in Chertsey, Surrey.

=== Career ===
Boorman was conscripted for military service and became a clerical instructor in the British Army. He did not serve in the Korean War, but once faced court-martial for "seducing a soldier from the course of his duty" by criticising the war to his trainees; this was abandoned when Boorman showed that The Times newspaper was the source of all his comments. After army service he worked as a drycleaner and journalist in the late 1950s. He ran the newsrooms at Southern Television in Southampton and Dover before moving into television documentary filmmaking, eventually becoming head of the BBC's Bristol-based documentary unit. In 1963 he wrote and directed a documentary about professional football, Six Days to Saturday, which focused on a week in the life of Swindon Town, a club in England's second division.

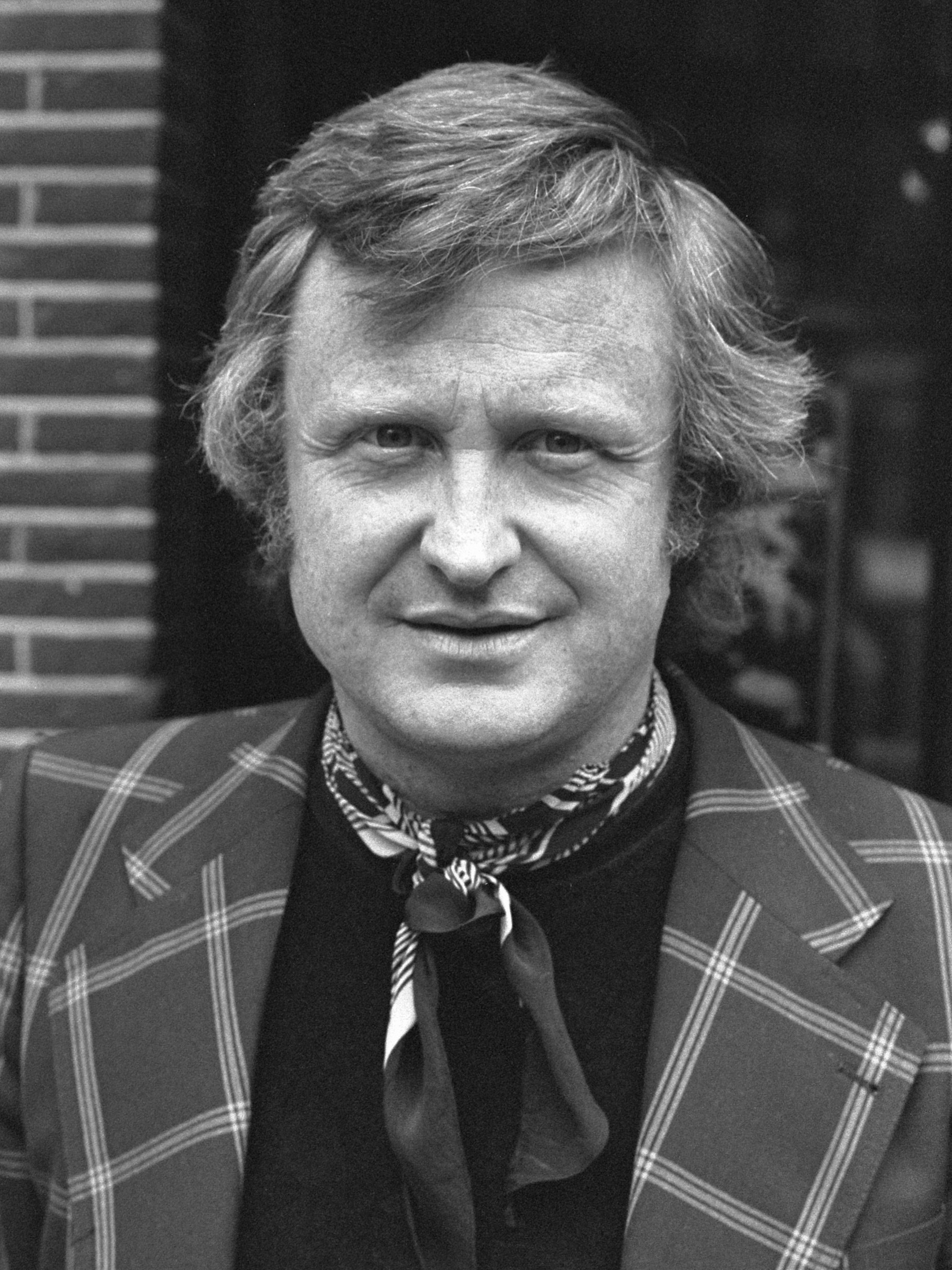
Boorman in 1974

Having caught the attention of a producer, David Deutsch, Boorman was offered the chance to direct a film aimed at repeating the success of Richard Lester's A Hard Day's Night (1964): Catch Us If You Can (1965) is about another pop group, the Dave Clark Five. While it was not as successful commercially as Lester's film was, it drew good reviews from distinguished critics such as Pauline Kael and Dilys Powell, and smoothed Boorman's way into the film industry.

Boorman was drawn to Hollywood for the opportunity to make more ambitious films and in Point Blank (1967), based on a novel by Richard Stark (a pen name of Donald E. Westlake), he brought a stranger's vision to the decaying fortress of Alcatraz and the proto-hippy world of the West Coast of the United States. Lee Marvin gave the unknown director his full support, telling studio Metro-Goldwyn-Mayer that he deferred all his approvals on the project to Boorman. After Point Blank, Boorman worked with Marvin and Toshiro Mifune on the robinsonade Hell in the Pacific (1968), which tells a fable of two representative soldiers stranded on an island.

After returning to the United Kingdom, Boorman made Leo the Last (1970), influenced by Federico Fellini and starring Fellini regular, Marcello Mastroianni. It won Boorman a Best Director Award at the 1970 Cannes Film Festival.

Boorman achieved much greater resonance with Deliverance (1972), adapted from a novel by James Dickey. It depicted the ordeal of four urban men, played by Jon Voight, Burt Reynolds, Ronny Cox and Ned Beatty, who encounter danger from an unexpected quarter while whitewater canoeing through the Appalachian backwoods. The film became Boorman's first true box office success and earned him several award nominations.

At the beginning of the 1970s, Boorman planned to film The Lord of the Rings and corresponded about his plans with the author, J. R. R. Tolkien. Ultimately the production proved too costly, though some elements and themes can be seen in Excalibur (1981). A wide variety of films followed. Zardoz (1974), starring Sean Connery, is a post-apocalyptic science fiction piece, set in the 23rd century where society is divided into two worlds. According to the director's film commentary, the "Zardoz world" is on a collision course with an "effete" eternal society.

Boorman was selected as director for Exorcist II: The Heretic (1977), a move that surprised the industry given his dislike of the original film. Boorman declared, "Not only did I not want to do the original film, I told the head of Warner Brothers, John Calley, [that] I'd be happy if he didn't produce the film too". The original script by a Broadway playwright, William Goodhart, was intellectual and ambitious, being concerned with the metaphysical nature of the battle between good and evil, and influenced by the writings of Catholic theologian Pierre Teilhard De Chardin, "I found It extremely compelling. It was based on Chardin's intoxicating idea that biological evolution was the first step In God's plan, starting with inert rock, and culminating in humankind." Despite Boorman's rewriting throughout shooting, the film was rendered incomprehensible. The film, released in June 1977, was a critical disaster but a moderate box office success. Boorman was denounced by William Peter Blatty, the author of the original novel The Exorcist, and by William Friedkin, director of the first Exorcist film. Boorman later admitted that his approach to the film was a mistake. The Heretic is often considered not just the worst film of The Exorcist series but one of the worst films of all time.

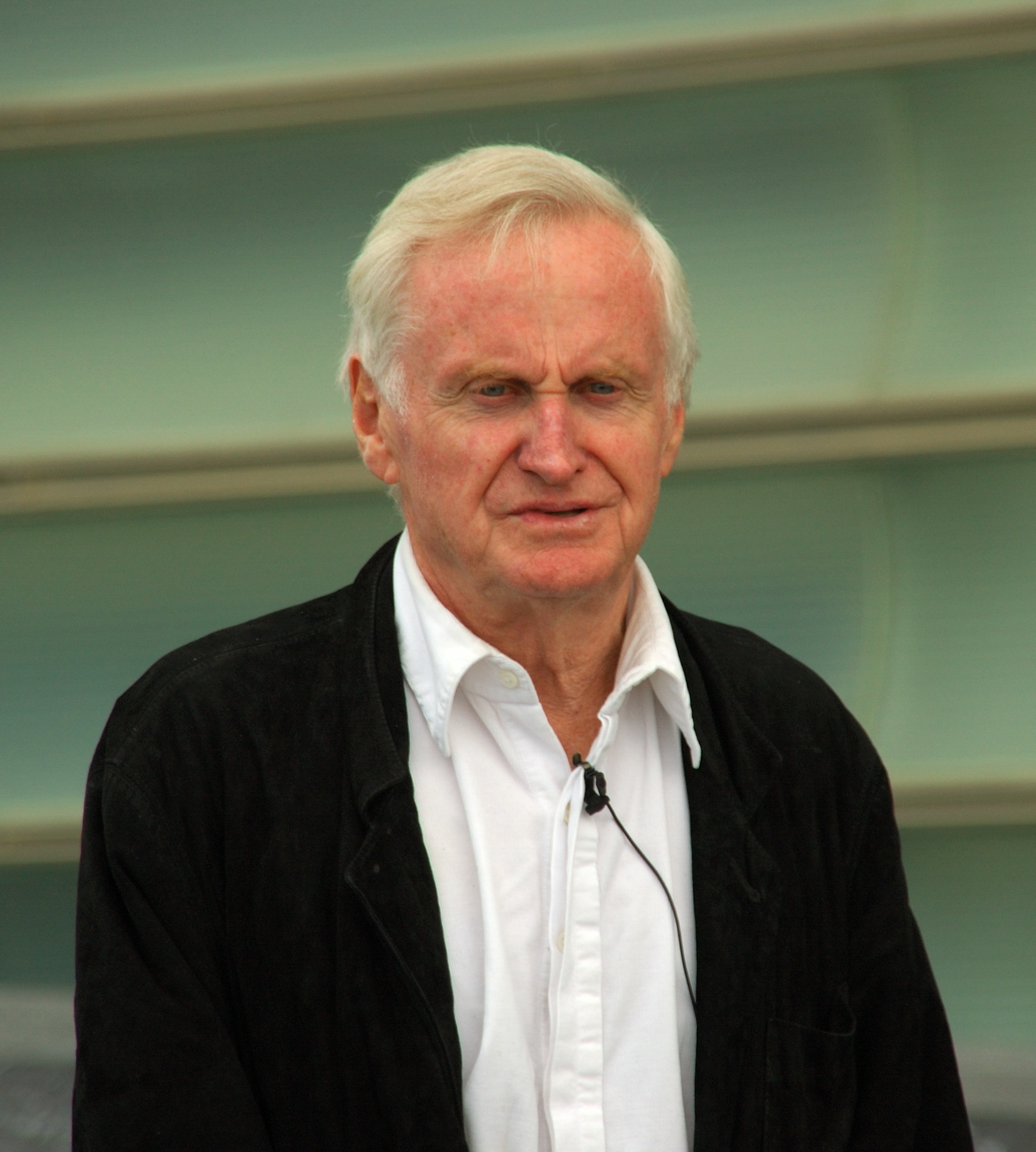
Boorman at the San Sebastián International Film Festival in September 2006

Excalibur, a long-held dream project of Boorman's, is a retelling of the Arthurian legend, based on Le Morte D'Arthur. Boorman cast Nicol Williamson and Helen Mirren over their protests, as the two disliked each other intensely but Boorman felt that their mutual antagonism would enhance their presentations of the characters they were playing. The production was based in Ireland, where Boorman had settled, and employed all of Boorman's children as actors and crew, a practice he repeated in later films. The film, one of the first to be produced by Orion Films, was a moderate success.

The Emerald Forest (1985) saw Boorman cast his son Charley Boorman as an eco-warrior in a rainforest adventure that included commercially required elements – action and near-nudity – with authentic anthropological detail. Rospo Pallenberg's original screenplay was adapted into a book of the same name by author Robert Holdstock. Because the film's distributor faced business troubles that year, the film did not receive a traditional "For Your Consideration" advertising campaign for the 1985 Academy Awards, despite positive critical reviews. Boorman took the initiative to promote the film himself by making VHS copies available for no charge to Academy members at several Los Angeles-area video rental stores. Boorman's idea later became ubiquitous during Hollywood's award season, and by the 2010s, more than a million Oscar screeners were mailed to Academy members each year. Emerald Forest received no nominations.

Hope and Glory (1987) was his most autobiographical movie, a retelling of his childhood in London during the Blitz. Produced by Goldcrest Films, with Hollywood financing the film, it proved a box office hit in the US, receiving numerous Oscar, BAFTA and Golden Globe nominations. His 1990 US-produced comedy about a dysfunctional family, Where the Heart Is, was a major flop.

When his friend David Lean died in 1991, Boorman was to take over direction of Lean's long-planned adaptation of Nostromo, but the production collapsed. Beyond Rangoon (1995) and The Tailor of Panama (2000) both explore unique worlds with alien characters stranded and desperate.

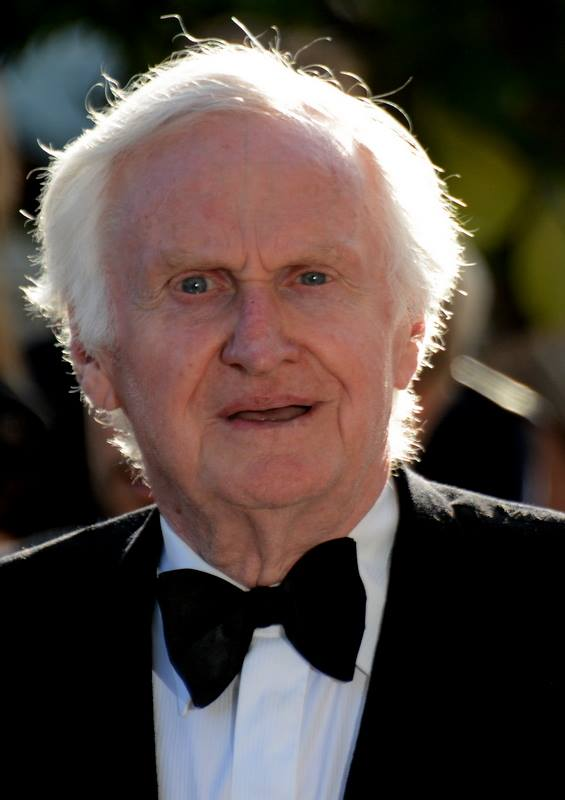
Boorman at the 2014 Cannes Film Festival

Boorman won the Best Director Award at the 1998 Cannes Film Festival for The General, his biopic of Martin Cahill. The film is about a glamorous, yet mysterious, criminal in Dublin who was killed, apparently by the Provisional Irish Republican Army. Boorman had been one of Cahill's burglary victims, having the gold record awarded for the score to Deliverance stolen from his home.

Released in 2006, his The Tiger's Tail was a thriller set against the tableau of early 21st century capitalism in Ireland. At the same time, Boorman began work on a long-time pet project of his, a fictional account of the life of Roman Emperor Hadrian (entitled Memoirs of Hadrian), written in the form of a letter from a dying Hadrian to his successor. In the meantime, a re-make/re-interpretation of the classic The Wonderful Wizard Of Oz with Boorman at the helm was announced in August 2009.

In 2007 and 2009 he took part in a series of events and discussions as part of the Arts in Marrakech Festival along with his daughter Katrine Boorman including an event with Kim Cattrall called 'Being Directed'. In November 2012 he was selected as a president of the main competition jury at the 2012 International Film Festival of Marrakech.

In autumn 2013, Boorman began shooting Queen and Country, the sequel to his 1987 Oscar-nominated Hope and Glory, using locations in Shepperton and Romania. The film was selected to be screened as part of the Directors' Fortnight section of the 2014 Cannes Film Festival.

In 2016, his debut novel, Crime of Passion, was published by Liberties Press of Dublin, with a French-language edition published by Marest in 2017.

In 2024, Boorman was revealed to be working on an animated project titled The Honey Wars, with Jamie Lee Curtis, Vanessa Kirby, Patrick Stewart, Brendan Gleeson, Richard E. Grant and Jon Voight all eyed to star, and Kavaleer Productions producing the project.

== Personal life ==
Boorman was a longtime resident of Ireland and lived in Annamoe, County Wicklow, close to the Glendalough twin lakes. In 2022, he put his property up for sale, intending to move to Surrey, England, where his son Charley lived. According to a 2012 interview, he was recently divorced. By 2020, he was married to his third wife.

He has seven children.

His son, Charley Boorman, has a career as an actor but reached a wider audience when he and actor Ewan McGregor made a televised motorbike trip across Europe, Central Asia, Siberia, Alaska, Canada, and the Midwest US during 2004. His daughter Katrine Boorman (Igrayne in Excalibur) works as an actress in France. Another daughter, Telsche, co-wrote the screenplay for Where the Heart Is with Boorman. She died of ovarian cancer in 1996 at the age of 36. She had been married to the journalist Lionel Rotcage, the son of French singer Régine, and they had a daughter together.

Boorman was appointed Commander of the Order of the British Empire (CBE) in the 1994 Birthday Honours for services to the film industry. In 2004, Boorman was also made a Fellow of BAFTA and in 2013 he received a Fellowship from the British Film Institute, an organisation he had previously served as a Governor. Boorman was knighted in the 2022 New Year Honours for services to film.

== Awards and nominations ==
Academy Awards

- Best Picture (1973) (Deliverance) – Nominated
- Best Director (1973) (Deliverance) – Nominated
- Best Picture (1988) (Hope and Glory) – Nominated
- Best Director (1988) (Hope and Glory) – Nominated
- Best Original Screenplay (1988) (Hope and Glory) – Nominated

British Academy Film Awards

- Best Film (1988) (Hope and Glory) – Nominated
- Best Original Screenplay (1988) (Hope and Glory) – Nominated
- BAFTA Fellowship (2004) – Won

Cannes Film Festival

- Best Director Award (1970) – Won
- Best Director Award (1998) – Won

Cinema for Peace

- The Cinema for Peace Award for the Most Valuable Film of the Year (2004) (In My Country) – Won

Golden Globe Awards

- Best Director (1973) (Deliverance) – Nominated
- Best Director (1988) (Hope and Glory) – Nominated
- Best Screenplay (1988) (Hope and Glory) – Nominated

== Works ==
=== Selected filmography ===
Film

Year	Title	Director	Producer	Writer
1965	Catch Us If You Can	Yes	No	No
1967	Point Blank	Yes	No	No
1968	Hell in the Pacific	Yes	No	No
1970	Leo the Last	Yes	No	Yes
1972	Deliverance	Yes	Yes	No
1974	Zardoz	Yes	Yes	Yes
1977	Exorcist II: The Heretic	Yes	Yes	No
1981	Excalibur	Yes	Yes	Yes
1985	The Emerald Forest	Yes	Yes	No
1987	Hope and Glory	Yes	Yes	Yes
1990	Where the Heart Is	Yes	Yes	Yes
1995	Beyond Rangoon	Yes	Yes	No
1998	Lee Marvin: A Personal Portrait by John Boorman	Yes	No	No
1998	The General	Yes	Yes	Yes
2001	The Tailor of Panama	Yes	Yes	Yes
2004	In My Country	Yes	Yes	No
2006	The Tiger's Tail	Yes	Yes	Yes
2014	Queen and Country	Yes	Yes	Yes
TBA	The Honey Wars	No	Yes	Yes

Short film

Year	Title	Director	Writer	Producer	Notes
1991	I Dreamt I Woke Up	Yes	Yes	Yes	Commissioned by the BBC for anthology series "The Director's Place"
1995	Two Nudes Bathing	Yes	Yes	No	Episode of Picture Windows

=== Bibliography ===
- Boorman, John, with Bill Stair (1974) Zardoz (novel)
- Boorman, John (1985). Money into Light: The Emerald Forest: A Diary. London: Faber and Faber.
- Boorman, John (1992). "Bright Dreams, Hard Knocks: A Journal for 1991". Projections: A Forum for Film Makers. London: Faber and Faber. ISBN 9780571168286.
- Boorman, John (2003). Adventures of a Suburban Boy. London: Faber and Faber.
- Boorman, John (2016). Crime of Passion. Liberties Press.
- Boorman, John (2020). Conclusions. London: Faber and Faber. ISBN 978-0-5713-5379-8.
- Boorman, John (2020). John Boorman's Nature Diary One Eye, One Finger. Dublin: Liliput Press. ISBN 978-1-8435-1795-5.

== See also ==
- List of British film directors
- List of Academy Award winners and nominees from Great Britain
