= Donovan Leitch (actor) =

British-American actor, singer (born 1967)

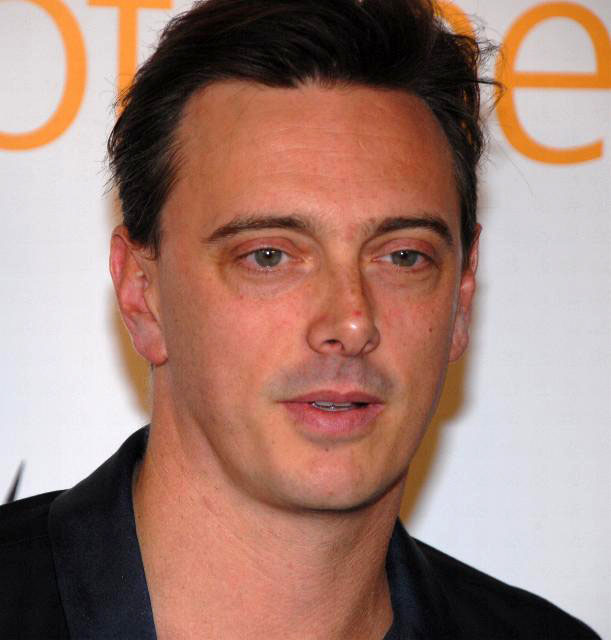
- Leitch at Hollywood Life Magazine's 7th Annual Breakthrough Awards on December 9, 2007
- Born: Donovan Jerome Leitch; August 16, 1967 (age 59); London, England
- Spouses: Kirsty Hume (m. 1997; div. 2014) Libby Mintz (m. 2015)
- Children: 2
- Relatives: Ione Skye (sister)

Donovan Jerome Leitch (born August 16, 1967) is a British-American actor and singer. He is the son of the singer-songwriter Donovan and the brother of actress Ione Skye. He was a member of the hard rock band Camp Freddy, was a founding member of neo-glam group Nancy Boy along with Jason Nesmith, the son of Michael Nesmith of The Monkees. As an actor, he is best known for portraying Paul Taylor in the 1988 remake of The Blob.

== Career ==
Leitch appeared in the films Breakin' 2: Electric Boogaloo (1985), The In Crowd (1988), ...And God Created Woman (1988), The Blob (1988), Glory (1989, portraying Charles Fessenden Morse), Cutting Class (1989), Gas, Food Lodging (1992), Dark Horse (1992), Jack the Bear (1993), Cityscrapes: Los Angeles (1994), I Shot Andy Warhol (1996), One Night Stand (1997) and Love Kills (1998). Leitch was featured as the villain of the week, Malcolm Lagg, an underground fight club coordinator for metahumans in the Birds of Prey episode "Gladiatrix".

In 1986, he auditioned for the role of "Bill S. Preston Esquire" in Bill & Ted's Excellent Adventure being one of the final picks along with Keanu Reeves, Gary Riley and Matt Adler. The role ultimately went to Alex Winter, who initially read for the part of Ted "Theodore" Logan.

In the early 1990s, Leitch formed Nancy Boy, an alternative rock band with glam rock and Britpop influences. The band also featured guitarist Jason Nesmith, son of Michael Nesmith of The Monkees, and bassist Nigel Mogg of the Quireboys. The band released two albums, Promosexual in 1995 and Nancy Boy in 1996. Although their second album was issued on major label Elektra Records, it failed to meet expectations, and the band fell inactive after Nesmith left the lineup a few years later.

== Personal life ==
Leitch was born in London, the son of singer/songwriter Donovan and model Enid Karl (née Stulberger). He is the brother of actress Ione Skye. His parents separated when he was three and he was raised by his mother in the Hollywood Hills of California. His father is Scottish, of partial Irish descent. His mother was raised in The Bronx, New York City and is Jewish.

He married Scottish model Kirsty Hume on September 23, 1997. Their daughter, Violet Jean Leitch, was born March 21, 2004, at home in Los Angeles. Leitch and Hume separated in 2011, and Hume filed for divorce in summer 2014.

Leitch proposed to actress Libby Mintz two months after Hume filed for divorce. He and Mintz had a son, Donovan Evers Leitch, on April 14, 2015, and were married in a ceremony in Los Angeles on October 3, 2015.

== Filmography ==
=== Film ===
Year	Title	Role	Notes
Filmed 1970; Released 2005	There is an Ocean	Himself (at age 3)	
1984	Breakin' 2: Electric Boogaloo	Dancer	
1986	The Education of Allison Tate	Martin Stubbs	
1988	The In Crowd	Del	
1988	And God Created Woman	Peter Moran	
1988	The Blob	Paul Taylor	
1989	Rock & Read	The Chaueffeur	Short
1989	Cutting Class	Brian Woods	
1989	Glory	Capt. Charles Fessenden Morse	
1992	Gas Food Lodging	Darius	
1992	Dark Horse	J.B. Hadley	
1993	Jack the Bear	Grad Student	
1996	Cityscrapes: Los Angeles	Troy	
1996	Bed, Bath and Beyond		Short
1996	I Shot Andy Warhol	Gerard Malanga	
1996	The Size of Watermelons	Patrick	
1997	One Night Stand	Kevin	
1997	Big City Blues	Donovan	
1998	Love Kills	Dominique	
1999	Cherry	Eddie	
2000	Men Make Women Crazy		Short
2008	The Dark Knight	Ward Neeley	Uncredited
2021	Habit	News Anchor	

=== Television ===
Year	Title	Role	Notes
1984	Alice	Dono-D	1 episode, Footloose Mel
1985	It's Your Move	Boy No. 3	1 episode, The Dregs of Humanity: Part 1
1988	Rockin' the Night Away		Television film
1989	21 Jump Street	Mike Pratt	1 episode, Mike's P.O.V.
1990	Life Goes On	Teddy	1 episode, The Banquet Room Renovation
1991	CBS Schoolbreak Special	Charlie Tyler	1 episode, But He Loves Me
1991	For the Very First Time		Television film
1999	The '60s	Neal Reynolds	Television film
2000	Sex and the City	Baird Johnson	1 episode, Boy, Girl, Boy, Girl...
2002	The Job	Barry / Crystal	1 episode, Parents
2002	Girls Club	Michael Harrod	9 episodes
2003	Birds of Prey	Malcolm	1 episode, Gladiatrix
2006	Grey's Anatomy	Rick Friart	1 episode, Tell Me Sweet Little Lies
2015–2016	Breaking Band	Producer	6 episodes

== Nancy Boy discography ==
=== Albums ===
- Promosexual (Equator, 1995)
- Nancy Boy (Sire Records 1996)

=== Singles ===
- "Johnny Chrome and Silver" (Equator, 1994)
- "Are "Friends" Electric?" (Equator, 1995)
- "Deep Sleep Motel" (Sire Records 1996)
