= Excalibur (film) =

1981 film by John Boorman

- Theatrical release poster by Bob Peak
- Directed by: John Boorman
- Screenplay by: Rospo Pallenberg; John Boorman
- Adaptation by: Rospo Pallenberg
- Based on: Le Morte d'Arthur by Thomas Malory
- Produced by: John Boorman
- Starring: Nigel Terry; Helen Mirren; Nicholas Clay; Cherie Lunghi; Paul Geoffrey; Nicol Williamson
- Cinematography: Alex Thomson
- Edited by: John Merritt; Donn Cambern (uncredited)
- Music by: Trevor Jones
- Production companies: Orion Pictures; Cinema ‘84
- Distributed by: Warner Bros. (United States); Columbia–EMI–Warner Distributors (United Kingdom)
- Release dates: 10 April 1981 (United States); 2 July 1981 (London); 5 July 1981 (United Kingdom)
- Running time: 140 minutes
- Countries: United Kingdom; United States
- Language: English
- Budget: $11 million
- Box office: $46.8 million

A motif from Wagner's Götterdämmerung, which was used prominently in Excalibur as the theme for the sword

Excalibur is a 1981 medieval fantasy film directed, co-written and produced by John Boorman, that retells the legend of King Arthur and the knights of the Round Table, based loosely on the 15th-century Arthurian romance Le Morte d'Arthur by Thomas Malory. It stars Nigel Terry as Arthur, Helen Mirren as Morgana, Nicholas Clay as Lancelot, Cherie Lunghi as Guenevere, Paul Geoffrey as Perceval and Nicol Williamson as Merlin. The film is named after the legendary sword of King Arthur that features prominently in Arthurian literature. The film's soundtrack features the music of Richard Wagner and Carl Orff, along with an original score by Trevor Jones.

Boorman's Excalibur began development as an unproduced adaptation of The Lord of the Rings. The film was shot entirely on location in Ireland and at Ardmore Studios, employing Irish actors and crew. It has been acknowledged for its importance to the Irish filmmaking industry and for helping launch the film and acting careers of a number of Irish and British actors, including Liam Neeson, Patrick Stewart, Gabriel Byrne and Ciarán Hinds.

Reviewers praised Excalibur's visual style, though some felt it came at the expense of a coherent plot or character depth. It won the award for Best Artistic Contribution at the 1981 Cannes Film Festival, and received an Oscar nomination for Best Cinematography and a BAFTA nomination for Best Costume Design. It grossed $35 million in the United States and Canada on a budget of $11 million.

== Plot ==
In the Dark Ages, the sorcerer Merlin retrieves the magical sword Excalibur from the Lady of the Lake for Uther Pendragon, who is declared king. In exchange for their future child, Merlin uses his Charm of Making to help Uther seduce Igrayne, the Duke of Cornwall's wife. When the Duke dies in battle and Igrayne gives birth to Arthur, Merlin takes the boy. Ambushed by the Duke's men, a mortally wounded Uther thrusts Excalibur into a stone. Merlin declares that he who pulls the sword from the stone shall be king.

Merlin entrusts Ector to raise Arthur, who becomes squire to Ector's son Kay. An annual jousting tournament gives the winner the right to try pulling the sword from the stone, though none have been able to do so. When Arthur loses Kay's sword and is desperate to find a replacement, he effortlessly pulls the sword from the stone, proving he is Uther's rightful heir. Leondegrance pledges his allegiance to Arthur, but they are opposed by knights who dispute Arthur's kingship as a bastard. Defending Leondegrance's castle and his daughter Guenevere, Arthur defeats Uryens and compels him to swear allegiance. Smitten with Guenevere, Arthur ignores Merlin's warning that she will fall in love with someone else.

Years later, the undefeated knight Lancelot has blocked a bridge and defeats each of Arthur's knights as they try to cross. Arthur himself is nearly defeated before unethically calling on the power of Excalibur to unfairly defeat Lancelot, breaking the indestructible blade in half across the armored heart of the impeccable warrior and plunging Lancelot to the ground as if dead. The Lady of the Lake restores the sword to a remorseful Arthur, and Lancelot swears allegiance to him. Unifying the land, Arthur and his knights create the Round Table and the castle Camelot. Secretly infatuated with each other, Lancelot escorts Guenevere to her wedding to Arthur, declaring that his loyalty to the king outweighs his love for her. Arthur's half-sister Morgana, the daughter of the Duke of Cornwall, reveals to Merlin that she is a sorceress, and Lancelot brings Perceval, who hopes to become a knight, to Camelot.

Influenced by Morgana, Gawain drunkenly accuses Guenevere of betraying the king, and demands a duel over her innocence. Resolved to impartially uphold the law, Arthur cannot defend Guenevere's honor himself. When no champion will fight for the queen, Perceval steps forward and is knighted by Arthur, before Lancelot arrives and defeats Gawain, sparing his life. Lancelot is followed into the forest by a deeply moved Guenevere, and they make love. Informed by Merlin, Arthur tracks them and thrusts Excalibur into the ground between the sleeping lovers. Merlin's magical link to the land impales him on the sword, as Morgana magically traps him and then steals his Charm of Making.

Taking Guenevere's form, Morgana seduces Arthur and gives birth to a son, Mordred. While praying to God for salvation, Arthur is struck by lightning, infecting the land with famine and sickness. A weakened Arthur sends his knights to search for the Holy Grail, hoping to restore the land and himself. Many knights die on their quest or are bewitched into Morgana's service, but Perceval resists her attacks. Mordred reaches adulthood, and his mother gifts him a golden suit of armour that she has enchanted so that no weapon made by man can pierce it. Mordred demands Arthur's crown, but Arthur can only offer him his love as his father, which is the only thing Mordred does not want from him, vowing to take Camelot by force.

Unable to save Uryens from Mordred, Perceval is attacked by Lancelot, who has renounced his knighthood. Thrown into a river and nearly drowned, Perceval is transported to the Grail and proves himself worthy, bringing the Grail to Arthur. He drinks from the Grail and is revitalized along with the land, calling upon Kay to rally their remaining forces against Mordred. Arthur finds Guenevere at a convent, and they reconcile before she gives him back Excalibur, which she had held in secret. At Stonehenge, Arthur's love liberates Merlin and they share a final conversation. Merlin tricks Morgana into speaking the Charm of Making, exhausting her powers and enveloping the battlefield in mist. Mordred discovers his now-haggard aged mother, murdering her in disgust.

Arthur and his men battle Mordred's forces, using the mist in their favour. Lancelot comes to Arthur's aid, reconciling with his friend and dying a true knight. At the battle's end, only Arthur, Perceval, and Mordred remain. In single combat, Mordred mortally wounds Arthur, running him through with a spear, but Arthur pulls himself down the spear's shaft and stabs Mordred with Excalibur (a weapon not made by man), killing him. Arthur commands Perceval to throw Excalibur into the water, knowing the sword will rise again for a worthy king. The Lady of the Lake catches the sword and disappears, and Perceval watches as Arthur is carried away on a ship toward Avalon.

== Cast ==
Credits from the AFI Catalog of Feature Films.

- Nigel Terry as Arthur
- Helen Mirren as Morgan(a) le Fay
  - Kay McLaren as aged Morgana
  - Barbara Byrne as young Morgana
- Nicol Williamson as Merlin
- Nicholas Clay as Lancelot
- Cherie Lunghi as Guenevere
- Paul Geoffrey as Perceval
- Corin Redgrave as Duke of Cornwall
- Patrick Stewart as Leondegrance
- Keith Buckley as Uryens
- Clive Swift as Ector
- Liam Neeson as Gawain
- Gabriel Byrne as Uther Pendragon
- Robert Addie as Mordred
  - Charley Boorman as young Mordred
- Katrine Boorman as Igrayne
- Ciarán Hinds as King Lot
- Niall O'Brien as Kay
- Liam O'Callaghan as Sadok
- Michael Muldoon as Astamor
- Mannix Flynn as Mordred’s Lieutenant
- Garrett Keogh as Mador
- Emmet Bergin as Ulfius
- Brid Brennan as Lady-in-Waiting
- Eamon Kelly as Abbot
- Hilary Joyalle as Lady of the Lake (uncredited)

== Production ==
=== Development ===
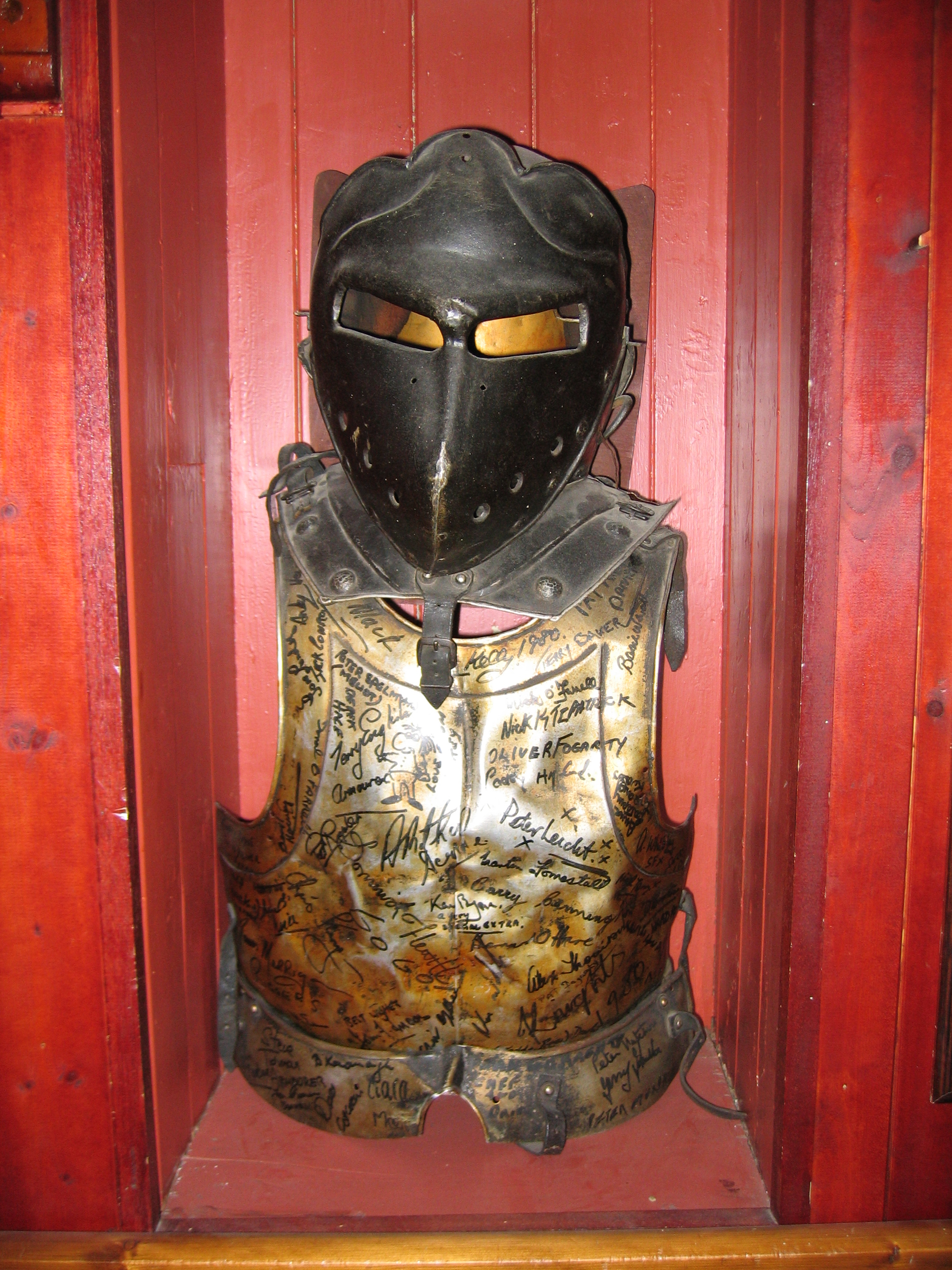
Autographed armour from the movie Excalibur in a pub in Cahir, Ireland, 2004

John Boorman had planned a film adaptation of the Merlin legend as early as 1969, but when submitting the three-hour script written with Rospo Pallenberg to United Artists, they rejected it deeming it too costly and offered him J. R. R. Tolkien's The Lord of the Rings instead. Boorman was allowed to shop the script elsewhere, but no studio would commit to it. Returning to his original idea of the Merlin legend, Boorman was eventually able to secure deals that would help him do Excalibur. Much of the imagery and set designs were created with his The Lord of the Rings project in mind.

=== Writing ===
Rospo Pallenberg and John Boorman wrote the screenplay, which is primarily an adaptation of Malory's Morte d'Arthur (1469–70) recasting the Arthurian legends as an allegory of the cycle of birth, life, decay, and restoration, by stripping the text of decorative or insignificant details. The resulting film is reminiscent of mythographic works such as Sir James Frazer's The Golden Bough and Jessie Weston's From Ritual to Romance. Arthur is presented as the "Wounded King" whose realm becomes a wasteland to be reborn thanks to the Grail, and may be compared to the Fisher (or Sinner) King, whose land also became a wasteland, and was also healed by Perceval. "The film has to do with mythical truth, not historical truth," Boorman remarked to a journalist during filming. The Christian symbolism revolves around the Grail, perhaps most strongly in the baptismal imagery of Perceval finally achieving the Grail quest. "That's what my story is about: the coming of Christian man and the disappearance of the old religions which are represented by Merlin. The forces of superstition and magic are swallowed up into the unconscious."

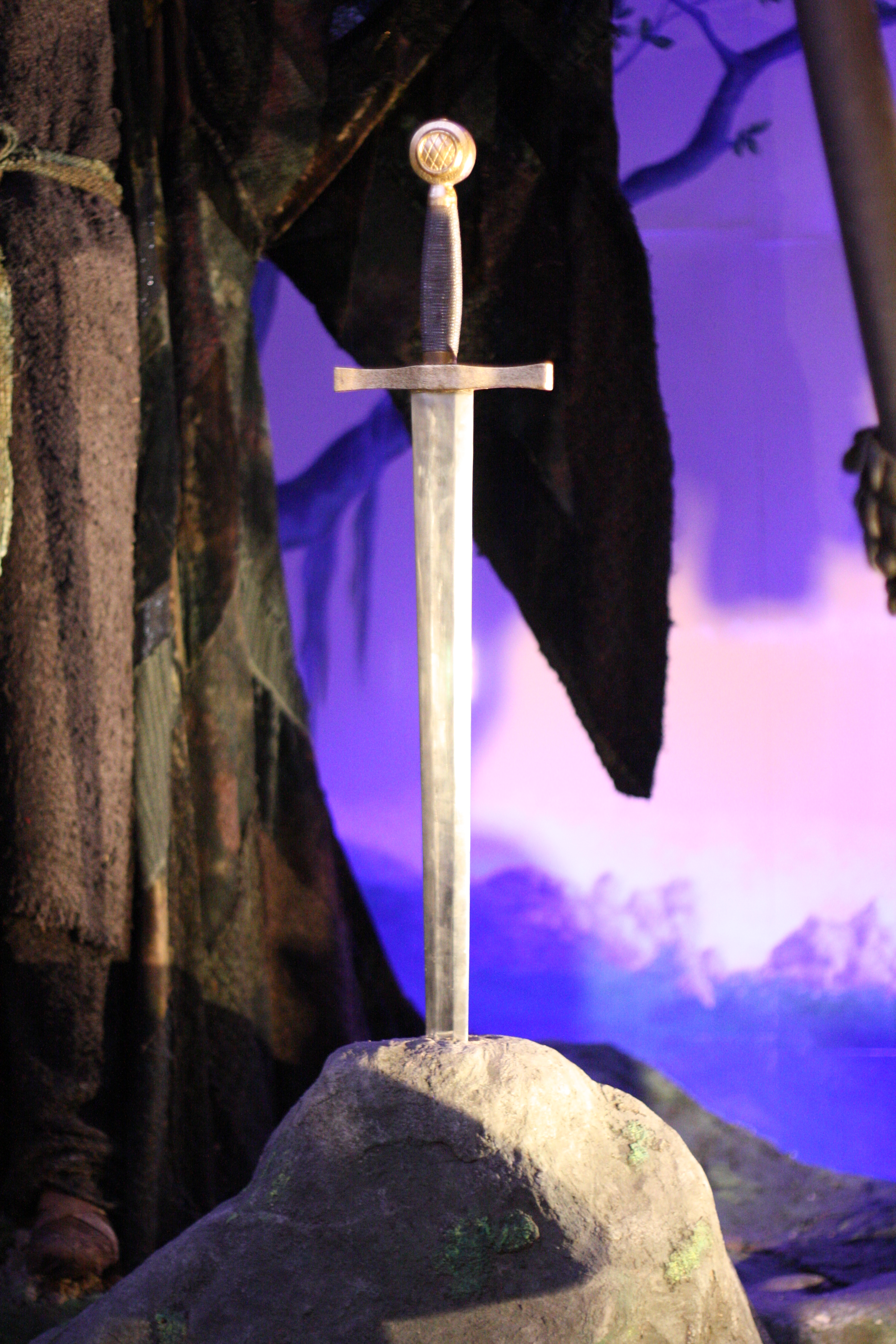
The film's sword Excalibur at the London Film Museum

In addition to Malory, the writers incorporated elements from other Arthurian stories, sometimes altering them. For example, the sword between the sleeping lovers' bodies comes from the tales of Tristan and Iseult; the knight who returns Excalibur to the water is changed from Bedivere to Perceval; and Morgause and Morgan Le Fay are merged into one character. The sword Excalibur and the Sword in the Stone are presented as the same thing; in some versions of the legends, they are separate. In Le Morte d'Arthur, Sir Galahad is the Knight who is worthy of the Holy Grail. Boorman follows the earlier version of the tale as told by Chrétien de Troyes, making Perceval the grail winner. Some new elements were added, such as Uther wielding Excalibur before Arthur (repeated in Merlin), Merlin's 'Charm of Making' (written in Old Irish), and the concept of the world as "the dragon" (probably inspired by the dragon omen seen in Geoffrey of Monmouth's account of Merlin's life).

The Charm of Making

According to linguist Michael Everson, the "Charm of Making" that Merlin speaks to invoke the dragon is an invention, there being no attested source for the charm. Everson reconstructs the text as Old Irish. The phonetic transcription of the charm as spoken in the film is Celtic pronunciation: [aˈnaːl naθˈrax, uːrθ vaːs beˈθʌd, doxˈjeːl ˈdjenveː]. Although the pronunciation in the film has little relation to how the text would actually be pronounced in Irish, the most likely interpretation of the spoken words, as Old Irish text is:

Anál nathrach,
orth’ bháis's bethad,
do chél dénmha

In modern English, this can be translated as:

Serpent's breath,
the charm of death and life,
thy omen of making.

=== Casting ===
As early as 1974, Boorman had considered casting Max von Sydow, Sean Connery, or Lee Marvin as Merlin. However, the film's comparatively low budget precluded such marquee casting. Boorman considered casting Klaus Kinski as Merlin, before choosing Nicol Williamson.

Boorman cast Williamson and Helen Mirren opposite each other as Merlin and Morgana, knowing that the two were on less than friendly terms due to personal issues that arose during a production of Macbeth seven years earlier. Boorman verified this on the Excalibur DVD commentary, saying he felt that the tension on the set would come through in the actors' performances.

Even though he was 35 years old, Nigel Terry plays King Arthur from his teenage years to his ending as an aged monarch. Excalibur was Terry's first leading role in a feature film, he was mainly a stage and television actor. For the role, Terry adopted a West Country accent, in order to reflect the mythological Arthur's association with Cornwall.

The rest of the cast were also relative unknowns, and for several it was their film debut or otherwise very early in their careers. As the film was shot in Ireland, many Irish actors appeared in the film, including Gabriel Byrne (in only his second film role), Liam Neeson (his third), and Ciarán Hinds (his very first). Neeson was cast after Boorman saw him in an Abbey Theatre production of Of Mice and Men.

Several members of the Boorman family appear in the cast: his daughter Katrine played Igraine, Arthur's mother, and his son Charley portrayed Mordred as a boy. Because of the number of Boormans involved with the film, it is sometimes called "The Boorman Family Project".

During filming, Liam Neeson and Helen Mirren became romantically involved, and lived together for several years thereafter.

=== Filming ===
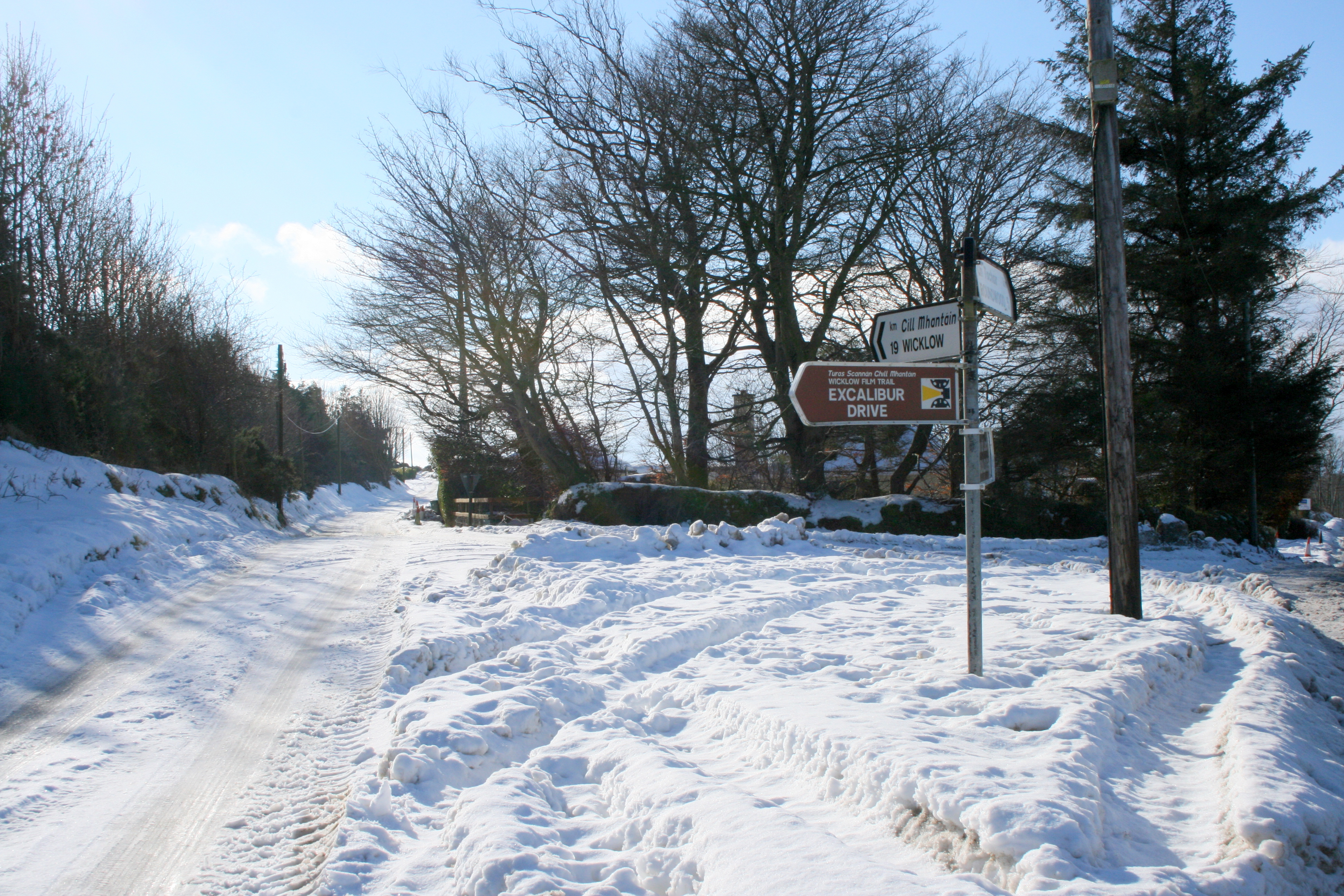
Excalibur locations trail in County Wicklow, 28 years after filming

Cahir Castle during the siege battle sequence

Excalibur was filmed in 1980 on location in County Wicklow, County Tipperary, and County Kerry, with the interiors shot at Ardmore Studios. The costumes were designed by Bob Ringwood. The armour was designed by Terry English.

An early critical battle scene at a castle, in which Arthur is made a knight by Uryens while kneeling in a moat, was filmed in Cahir Castle, in Cahir County Tipperary, a well-preserved Irish castle. The castle's moat is the River Suir which flows around it. The fight with Lancelot was filmed at Powerscourt Estate's waterfall. Other locations included Wicklow Head as the backdrop to the battle over Tintagel, the Kerry coast as the place from which Arthur sails to Avalon, and a place called Childers Wood near Roundwood, County Wicklow, where Arthur comes on Excalibur in the stone. At the time, John Boorman was living just a few miles down the road, at Annamoe. According to Boorman, the love scene between Lancelot and Guenevere in the forest was filmed on a very cold night, but Nicholas Clay and Cherie Lunghi performed the scene nude anyway.

The opening battle sequence had to be remounted twice, when a fault in the light meter led the first two attempts to come out underexposed. The original director of photography, Tony Pierce-Roberts, suffered a nervous breakdown and was replaced by Alex Thomson. Heavy rainfall meant shooting was frequently delayed.

=== Music ===
Classical music excerpts by Richard Wagner ("Siegfried's Funeral March", "Prelude to Parsifal", "Prelude to Tristan and Isolde") and Carl Orff ("O Fortuna") feature prominently in the film. The original underscore was written by Trevor Jones, the South African composer's first score for a major feature film. The score was performed by the London Philharmonic Orchestra.

Critic Thomas Glorieux noted "here the classical music was given the opportunity to shine through most of the important scenes, while giving Jones the underscore to tie it all together."

=== Editing ===
According to Boorman, the film was originally three hours long; among the scenes that were deleted from the finished film, but featured in one of the promotional trailers, was a sequence where Lancelot rescued Guenevere from a forest bandit.

== Release ==
The film opened in the United States on 10 April 1981 and in London on 2 July 1981, before opening nationwide in the United Kingdom on 5 July 1981. The film was initially released in the United States with an R rating. Distributors later announced a 119 minute PG-rated version, with less graphic sex and violence, but it was not widely released. When first released in the United Kingdom, the film was classified as an "AA" by the BBFC, restricting it to those aged 14 and over. In 1982, the BBFC replaced the "AA" certificate with the higher age-specific "15", which was applied to Excalibur when released on home video. When Excalibur first premiered on HBO in 1982, the R-rated version was shown in the evening and the PG-rated version was shown during the daytime, following the then-current rule of HBO only showing R-rated films during the evening hours.

Excalibur was re-released in Ultra HD in the UK on February 23, 2026 and in the US and Canada on February 24, 2026 by Arrow Films.

== Reception ==
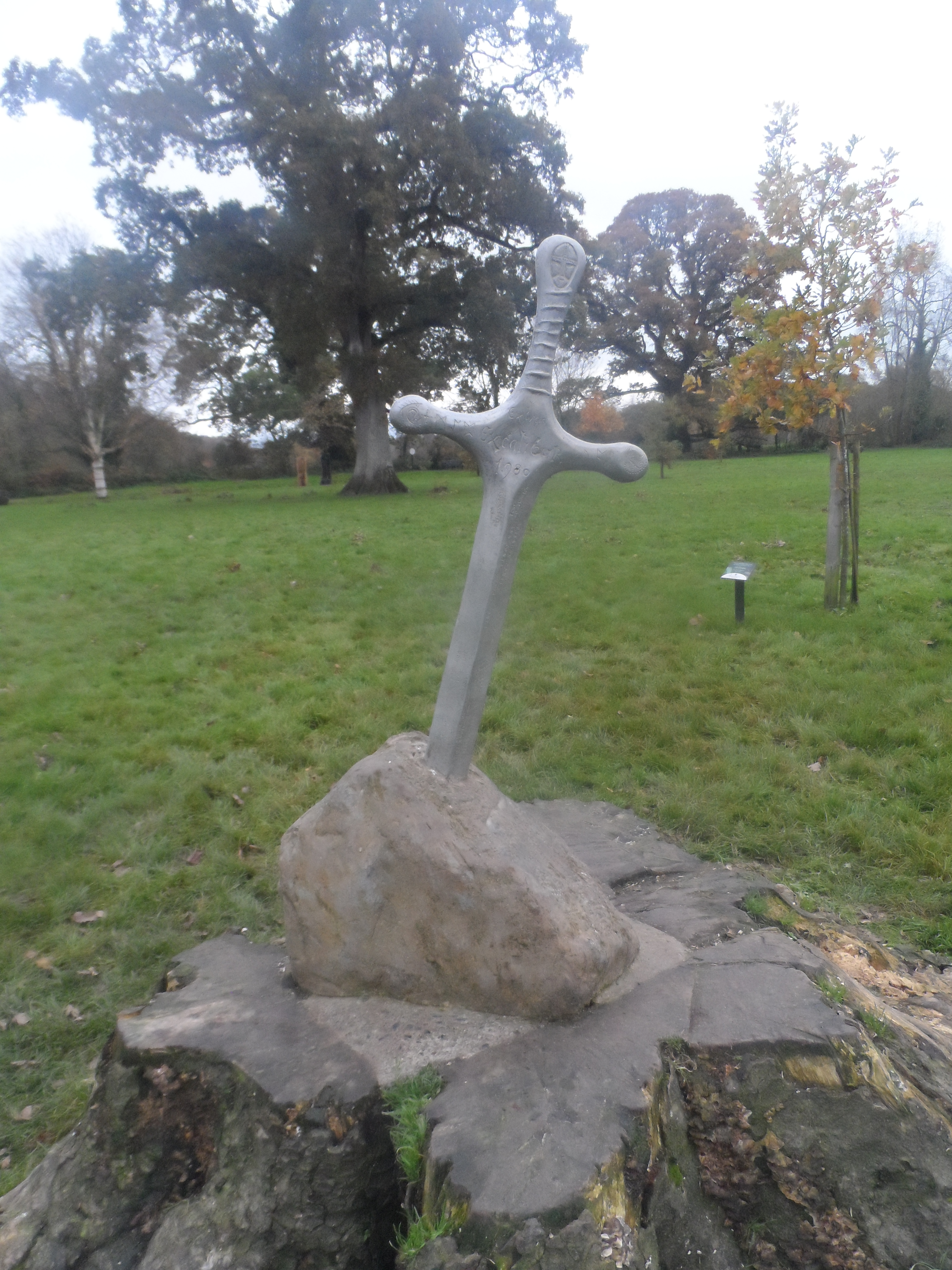
The "Sword in the Stone" sculpture, located at Cahir Castle, one of the filming locations. It was created by local stonemason Philip Quinn and bears the names of local people who appeared as extras.

Excalibur was the number one film in the United States during its opening weekend, eventually grossing $34,967,437 in the United States and Canada, ranking as the 18th highest-grossing film of the year. On review aggregator Rotten Tomatoes, it holds a 73% score based on 99 reviews. The film's critics consensus states, "John Boorman's operatic, opulent take on the legend of King Arthur is visually remarkable, and features strong performances from an all-star lineup of British thespians." On Metacritic, it has a weighted average score of 56 out of 100 based on reviews from 10 critics.

Roger Ebert called it both a "wondrous vision" and "a mess". Elaborating further, Ebert wrote that the film was "a record of the comings and goings of arbitrary, inconsistent, shadowy figures who are not heroes but simply giants run amok. Still, it's wonderful to look at". Vincent Canby wrote that while Boorman took Arthurian myths seriously, "he has used them with a pretentiousness that obscures his vision." In her review in The New Yorker, Pauline Kael wrote that the film had its own "crazy integrity", adding that the imagery was "impassioned" with a "hypnotic quality". According to her, the dialogue was "near-atrocious". She concluded by writing that "Excalibur is all images flashing by... We miss the dramatic intensity that we expect the stories to have, but there's always something to look at".

Others have praised the entire film, with Variety calling it "a near-perfect blend of action, romance, fantasy and philosophy". Sean Axmaker of Parallax View wrote "John Boorman's magnificent and magical Excalibur is, to my mind, the greatest and the richest screen incarnation of the oft-told tale." In a later review upon the film's DVD release, Salon's David Lazarus noted the film's contribution to the fantasy genre, stating that it was "a lush retelling of the King Arthur legend that sets a high-water mark among sword-and-sorcery movies". A study by Jean-Marc Elsholz demonstrates how closely the film Excalibur was inspired by the Arthurian romance tradition and its intersections with medieval theories of light, most particularly in the aesthetic/visual narrative of Boorman's film rather than in its plot alone.

Christopher John reviewed Excalibur in Ares Magazine #9 and commented that "Excalibur is a shockingly large film and an incredibly intricate and fascinating piece of cinema. It is a fine prologue for the spate of fantasy films waiting in the wings for release this year." The film featured many actors early in their careers who later became very well-known, including Helen Mirren, Patrick Stewart, Liam Neeson, Gabriel Byrne, and Ciarán Hinds. For his performance as Merlin, Nicol Williamson received widespread acclaim. The Times in 1981 wrote: "The actors are led by Williamson's witty and perceptive Merlin, missed every time he's offscreen".

C. J. Henderson reviewed Excalibur for Pegasus magazine and stated that "As far as Excalibur was concerned, a grimmer, more serious sword and sorcery film has never been made."

=== Accolades ===
Institution	Year	Category	Nominee	Result
Academy Awards	1982	Best Cinematography	Alex Thomson	Nominated
British Academy Film Awards	1982	Best Costume Design	Bob Ringwood	Nominated
British Society of Cinematographers	1981	Best Cinematography in a Theatrical Feature Film	Alex Thomson	Nominated
Cannes Film Festival	1981	Palme d'Or	John Boorman	Nominated
Cannes Film Festival	1981	Best Artistic Contribution	John Boorman	Won
Hugo Awards	1982	Best Dramatic Presentation	John Boorman, Rospo Pallenberg, Thomas Malory	Nominated
Saturn Awards	1982	Best Fantasy Film	—N/a	Nominated
Saturn Awards	1982	Best Director	John Boorman	Nominated
Saturn Awards	1982	Best Supporting Actor	Nicol Williamson	Nominated
Saturn Awards	1982	Best Supporting Actress	Helen Mirren	Nominated
Saturn Awards	1982	Best Costume Design	Bob Ringwood	Won
Saturn Awards	1982	Best Make-up	Basil Newall, Anna Dryhurst	Nominated

== Legacy ==
The comedic 1989 teaser trailer for Leatherface: The Texas Chainsaw Massacre III directly parodies the lady of the lake scene from Excalibur.

In 2009, filmmaker Zack Snyder said Excalibur was his favorite film, calling it "the perfect meeting of movies and mythology".

The 2018 adaptation of science fiction novel Ready Player One features the charm of making as an activation code.

During the shooting of the 2023 film Irati, inspired by Basque mythology and several medieval films including Excalibur, the crew nicknamed it Euskalibur, after euskal, ("Basque-language").

The British extreme metal band Anaal Nathrakh took their name from Merlin's Charm of Making.

=== Documentaries ===
Neil Jordan directed a 1981 documentary on the making of Excalibur, entitled The Making of Excalibur: Myth Into Movie. In 2013 another documentary entitled Behind the Sword in the Stone was released featuring interviews with director Boorman and many of the cast, such as Terry, Mirren, Stewart, Neeson, Byrne, Lunghi, and Charley Boorman. Distribution rights were later acquired by PBS International, and the title was changed to Excalibur: Behind the Movie. As of June 2020, this documentary was made available in the United States through various online streaming services.

== See also ==
- List of American films of 1981
- List of films based on Arthurian legend
- List of sword and sorcery films
