= Evils of the Night =

- Directed by: Mardi Rustam
- Written by: Mardi Rustam; Philip Dennis Connors
- Produced by: Mardi and Mohammed Rustam
- Starring: Aldo Ray; Neville Brand; Tina Louise; John Carradine; Julie Newmar
- Cinematography: Don Stern
- Edited by: Henri Charr
- Music by: Robert O. Ragland
- Distributed by: Aquarius Releasing
- Release date: October 25, 1985
- Running time: 84 minutes
- Country: United States
- Language: English

Evils of the Night is a 1985 American science fiction horror film starring Aldo Ray, Neville Brand, Tina Louise, John Carradine, and Julie Newmar. The film was directed, co-produced and co-written by Mardi Rustam.

== Plot ==
"Space vampires" Dr. Kozmar (Carradine) and his assistants, Dr. Zarma (Newmar) and Cora (Louise), recruit two sadistic garage mechanics (Ray and Brand) to abduct teenagers living in a college town and bring them to a rural hospital. There, the aliens drain them of their blood, which they need to stay young, and save their dying planet.

== Cast ==
- Neville Brand as Kurt
- Aldo Ray as Fred
- Julie Newmar as Dr. Zarma
- John Carradine as Dr. Kozmar
- Tina Louise as Cora
- Karrie Emerson as Nancy
- Bridget Holloman as Heather
- David Hawk as Brian
- Tony O'Dell as Billy
- Amber Lynn as Joyce
- Jerry Butler as Eddie
- G.T. Taylor as Connie

== Production ==
Filming began in June 1983 in Los Angeles and completed in October 1983.

Only mainstream film appearances of adult film stars Crystal Breeze and Jody Swafford. It is also the first mainstream role for adult film star Amber Lynn, who went on to appear in other mainstream movies and shows in her career. All three were cast to add nudity and sex to the film in order to appeal to a bigger audience.

== Release ==
The film premiered in New York City on October 25, 1985.

=== Critical response ===
Reviews were generally negative. A reviewer at the Atlanta Journal-Constitution wrote, Evils of the Night is an attempt to introduce an appalling new genre: The "Teen Sex Comedy-Slice 'N' Dice Thriller-Martians Have Landed Combo." Roger Hurlburt at the Fort Lauderdale Sun Sentinel wrote, "Simply stated, Evils of the Night is a deplorable motion picture." Michael Weldon in his 1996 Psychotronic Video Guide described this as a good example of "inept filmmaking" and an opportunity to "see once-popular stars degraded."

== See also ==
- Evil Town
