= Eaten Alive =

1976 film by Tobe Hooper

- Theatrical release poster
- Directed by: Tobe Hooper
- Written by: Kim Henkel; Alvin L. Fast; Mardi Rustam
- Produced by: Mardi Rustam
- Starring: Neville Brand; Mel Ferrer; Carolyn Jones; Marilyn Burns; William Finley; Stuart Whitman
- Cinematography: Robert Caramico
- Edited by: Michael Brown
- Music by: Wayne Bell; Tobe Hooper
- Production company: Mars Productions Corporation
- Distributed by: Virgo International Pictures
- Release date: October 29, 1976 (Texas)
- Running time: 91 minutes
- Country: United States
- Language: English

Eaten Alive (known under various alternate titles, including Death Trap, Horror Hotel, and Starlight Slaughter, and stylized on the poster as Eaten Alive!) is a 1976 American exploitation slasher horror film directed by Tobe Hooper, from a screenplay by Kim Henkel, Alvin L. Fast, and Mardi Rustam. It stars Neville Brand, Mel Ferrer, Carolyn Jones, Roberta Collins, Robert Englund, William Finley, Marilyn Burns, Janus Blythe, and Kyle Richards.

The film centers on Judd (Brand), a psychotic hotel proprietor in a Southern bayou, (Note: The setting of the film has been alternately identified as either Louisiana or Florida.) who feeds those who upset him to a large crocodile that lives in a swamp beside the hotel. The story is loosely based on Joe Ball, a Texas murderer and suspected serial killer from the late 1930s.

Although the film did not receive a warm reception when it was released, it has gained a cult following in its time, and with The Texas Chain Saw Massacre from 1974, Eaten Alive helped Hooper advance in his career, allowing him to direct his first major studio film, The Funhouse, in 1981.

== Plot ==
After refusing a demand for anal sex from a scummy customer named Buck, naïve prostitute Clara Wood is evicted from the town brothel by the madame, Miss Hattie. Clara makes her way to the decrepit Starlight Hotel, located deep in the remote swampland of rural Texas, where she encounters the hotel's mentally disturbed proprietor, Judd. Judd chases her outside, then attacks and kills her with a pitchfork before feeding her to his pet Nile crocodile that lives in the swamp beside the hotel.

Some days later, a fractious couple, the well-dressed, pill-popping Faye and her disturbed husband Roy, arrive at the hotel with their young daughter, Angie. Shortly after their arrival, the family dog, Snoopy, is brutally attacked by the resident crocodile, which shocks little Angie. In retaliation, Roy goes out to kill the carnivorous swamp creature but is attacked by Judd, who is wielding a large scythe. In the struggle, Roy manages to shoot Judd in the foot, but Judd—who has a false leg—is uninjured and kills Roy. Judd then violently beats and straps Faye onto her bed and attempts to grab Angie, but she escapes and hides under the hotel's porch.

Later, Harvey Wood and his daughter Libby also arrive at the Starlight Hotel, seeking information on the now-deceased Clara, who is Harvey's runaway daughter, but they leave when Judd denies having seen her. Accompanied by Sheriff Martin, Harvey and Libby question Miss Hattie, who also denies ever seeing Clara. Harvey returns to the creepy swamp hotel alone, while Libby goes for dinner and drinks with the sheriff. After Harvey discovers a captive Faye in her hotel room, Judd murders him, once again utilizing his large scythe.

Meanwhile, after being kicked out of a bar by the sheriff, Buck and his underaged girlfriend Lynette venture to the Starlight, much to the annoyance of Judd. When Buck hears screams from Faye and Angie crying under the porch, he is pushed into the swamp by Judd and devoured by the crocodile. Lynette runs outside and is spotted by Judd. She runs into the woods screaming, and he pursues her. However, the fog causes Judd to lose sight of her, and Lynette is saved by a man in a passing car.

Later, Libby arrives back at the hotel and manages to untie Faye from her bed and retrieve Angie from under the porch. Consumed with madness, Judd chases the three survivors into the swamp, where he is finally attacked and killed by his pet reptile. Sheriff Martin then arrives at the hotel and rescues Libby, Faye, and Angie. Before the credits roll, Judd's false leg comes up from the water.

== Cast ==
- Neville Brand as Judd
- Mel Ferrer as Harvey Wood
- Carolyn Jones as Miss Hattie
- Marilyn Burns as Faye
- William Finley as Roy
- Stuart Whitman as Sheriff Martin
- Roberta Collins as Clara Wood
- Kyle Richards as Angie
- Robert Englund as Buck
- Janus Blythe as Lynette
- Crystin Sinclaire as Libby Wood

== Production ==
Following the success of The Texas Chain Saw Massacre (TCSM), Tobe Hooper (alongside TCM co-writer Kim Henkel) worked on scripts for the murder mystery Bleeding Hearts and another project titled Dead and Alive. However, neither came to materialize and Hooper was approached by Psychic Killer producer Mardi Rustam to direct Eaten Alive. The film's budget was mainly gathered on Hooper's name alone and is reported to have been $600,000.

The concept came from Rustam and Alvin Fast but the screenplay was written by Henkel and Hooper. The plot was very loosely based on the story of Joe Ball (also known as the Alligator Man or The Butcher of Elmendorf) who owned a bar with a live alligator attraction during the 1930s in Elmendorf, Texas. During this time, Ball murdered several women. Legend has it that he disposed of his victims' bodies by feeding them to his pet alligators, but this was never proven.

Working under the title Death Trap, Eaten Alive was filmed entirely on the sound stages of Raleigh Studios in Hollywood, California, which had a large-scale pool that could double as a swamp. Shooting on a sound stage instead of a practical location contributed to the atmosphere of the film, which director Tobe Hooper described as a "surrealistic, twilight world." The film eventually proved to be problematic for the director, though, who left the set shortly before production ended, due to a dispute with the producers. Hooper's good relationship with his actors remained intact, though. The director later recalled how he worked with actor Neville Brand to fully develop the character of Judd, declaring, "He understood what he was doing exactly.” Kyle Richards, however, told Entertainment Weekly in 2021 that filming Eaten Alive had been disturbing and had caused her "a lot of anxiety."

== Release ==
The film was initially released in 1976 under the title Starlight Slaughter by Virgo International, then re-released as Eaten Alive by New World Pictures in 1978. On its 1978 release, the film received an R rating from the Motion Picture Association of America. This was upgraded to an X rating by Chicago's film review board, but the rating was rejected by New World Pictures on free speech grounds. The film was one of the first to challenge a Chicago law allowing films to be banned for under-18s due to violent content (rather than sexually explicit content). However, the film review board's decision was upheld by an appeal board and later in court. The film went on to be a commercial flop, and was re-released under various titles in an attempt to recoup losses.

Although passed with cuts for its theatrical release in Britain in 1978, an uncensored version was released on home video by VIPCO in 1982 under the title Death Trap. Its gratuitous violence became the focal point of many social critics in the UK, including vocal conservative activist Mary Whitehouse, and the film became one of the first of the so-called "video nasties" to be prosecuted under the Obscene Publications Act 1959. As a result, the master tapes for Eaten Alive were confiscated from VIPCO's offices and all video copies were removed from retail stores. The film was removed from the list of banned video nasties in 1985 and was eventually re-released on VHS in 1992, although 25 seconds were removed from the original cut by the British Board of Film Classification (BBFC). An uncut version was released on DVD in 2000, and a Blu-ray was distributed by Arrow Films in 2015.

== Critical reception ==
=== Contemporary reception ===
Eaten Alive was largely ignored by audiences upon release and received negative reviews from critics. David Bartholomew of Cinefantastique complained of the "unevenly directed" cast and predictable plot, claiming the film's only saving grace was the "airless, claustrophobic set, supposedly exterior but obviously built on a sound stage" which called back to horror movies of the 1930s and 40s such as Strangler of the Swamp. Linda Gross in the Los Angeles Times called the script "implausible and offensive", taking particular issue with the "gratuitous violence, nudity and soupçon of kinky sex". In The Monthly Film Bulletin, Martyn Auty criticized "the linear and predictable pattern of slaughter" that he felt eliminated the possibility of suspense, and the use of female characters as the victims of sexual violence that "suggests that sexism remains an unconscious force in exploitation cinema".

=== Retrospective reviews ===
Since its initial release, Eaten Alive has come to have a more mixed reception. According to Quentin Tarantino, the film's reputation began to improve amongst horror fans throughout the 1980s, and some critics claim its initial reception was due to a delayed critical resentment following the success of The Texas Chain Saw Massacre. Writing in 2002, John Kenneth Muir stated "Today, the critical community is polarized about the movie. Some reviewers see it as pure exploitation, whereas others see it as a compellingly lurid companion piece to Hooper's work in The Texas Chain Saw Massacre." The film holds an approval rating of 28% on Rotten Tomatoes based on 18 reviews, with a weighted average rating of 4.7/10. Metacritic assigned the film a weighted average score of 48 out of 100, based on 6 reviews, indicating "mixed or average" critical reception.

A number of reviews compared Eaten Alive negatively to The Texas Chain Saw Massacre. One point of departure was the explicit use of violence in Eaten Alive as opposed to the mere suggestion of violence in The Texas Chain Saw Massacre. Josh Goller of Spectrum Culture called the approach "tawdry" and said "it simply doesn't possess enough transgressive power to truly shock". The use of a soundstage as opposed to on-location filming was also commented upon by critics. Scream Magazine writer Cleaver Patterson felt it "kills the sense of reality which made TCM [Texas Chain Saw Massacre] so chilling" and Dread Central's Dave J. Wilson dubbed the set design "cheap, tacky and fake". However, Wilson did think it added to the strangeness of the film, and critics from Syfy Wire and Starburst remarked that the obviousness of the sets in conjunction with Caramico's bright, colourful lighting helped the film achieve a surreal, dream-like atmosphere.

Stefan Jaworzyn in The Texas Chain Saw Massacre Companion and Josh Goller in Spectrum Culture felt that the sound design and score added to the surreal feeling of the film. This opinion was mirrored by composer Fabio Frizzi, who states that the "mix of country western songs and paroxysmal effects" effectively symbolises Judd's madness for the viewer. An obituary for Hooper for the British Film Institute cited the film's "musique concrète concerto" as one of the factors making the movie "one of the most grating, oppressive films ever made" and compared it favourably to the album Metal Machine Music. Other reviewers were less enthusiastic, with Doug Brod writing for Entertainment Weekly about the "garish lighting and intense dentist-drill 'score'."

In general, reviewers felt that the characters as written were unlikable and it was hard to root for them, but some individual performances received praise. Brand's performance as Judd was pointed to as a highlight, described as "enough to make the movie a minor genre classic" by one critic and "one of the great overlooked characters in horror cinema" by another. Robert Englund was also praised as Buck in IGN and Scream Magazine; Tarantino particularly enjoyed Englund's "sensational" performance, so much that he referenced Englund's opening line "Name's Buck and I'm rarin' to fuck" in his 2003 movie Kill Bill: Volume 1.

== Themes ==
One of the key themes of Eaten Alive is summed up by Screen Slate as "homo homini gatorus: man is bloodthirsty killer gator to man." Throughout the film, each of the characters represent and are driven by base desires: Judd by murderous instincts, Buck by lust, and even Sheriff Martin (Stuart Whitman) who is romantically interested in Libby Wood (Crystin Sinclaire). This idea is echoed in Judd's rambling monologues—his justifications that "he makes no distinctions" and "you've got to do what you've got to do" apply equally to the crocodile as to Judd or any of the other characters—and by the sound design, which overlays human screams, radio music and animal sounds to suggest an equivalence between the human characters and non-human animals.

A number of critics identified black comedy in the film. For Screen Slate, the film's satirical take on human nature as animalistic and violent represents a shift towards more overt comedy compared to The Texas Chain Saw Massacre. Literature and media studies professors Kristopher Woofter and Will Dodson list Eaten Alive as among Hooper's films that are "infused with dark humor in their unsettling of America's sacrosanct vision of family and nation." Muir argues that the violence throughout is so messy, error-laden and over-the-top that it become comedic.

== See also ==
- Crocodile (2000 film)
