= Curtis Hanson =

American filmmaker (1945–2016)

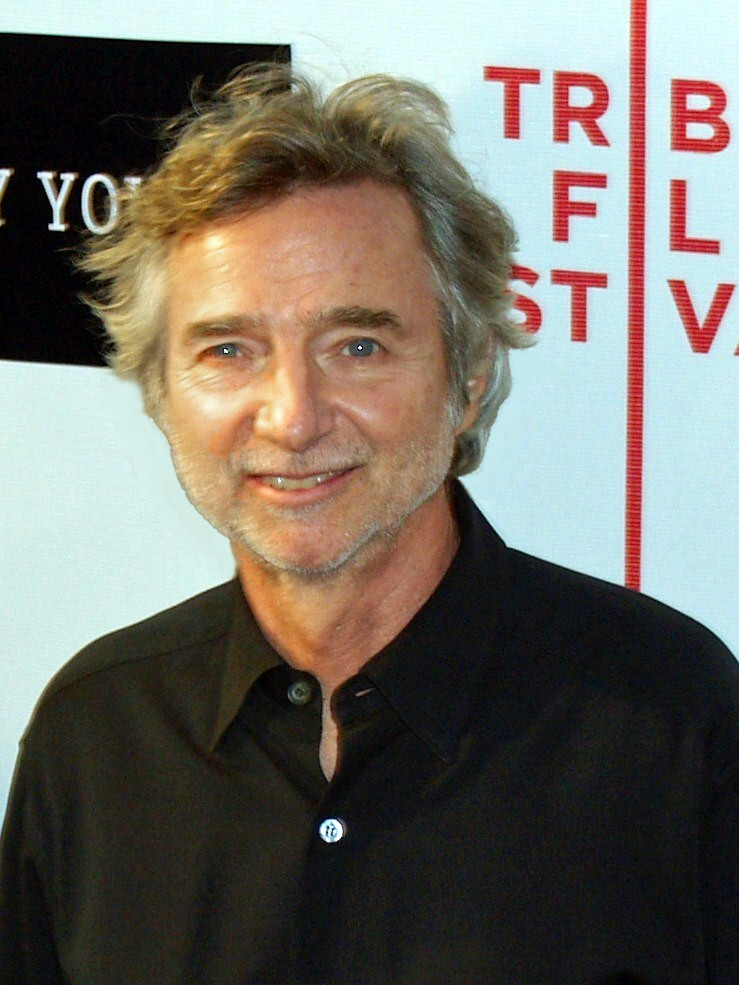
- Hanson at the 2007 Tribeca Festival
- Born: Curtis Lee Hanson; March 24, 1945; Reno, Nevada, U.S.
- Died: September 20, 2016 (aged 71); Los Angeles, California, U.S.
- Occupations: Director; producer; screenwriter
- Years active: 1970–2014
- Notable work: The Dunwich Horror; The Hand That Rocks the Cradle; The River Wild; L.A. Confidential; Wonder Boys; 8 Mile; In Her Shoes

Curtis Lee Hanson (March 24, 1945 – September 20, 2016) was an American film director, screenwriter, and producer. Born in Reno, Nevada, Hanson grew up in Los Angeles. After dropping out of high school, Hanson worked as photographer and editor for Cinema magazine. In the 1970s, Hanson participated as a writer for the horror film The Dunwich Horror (1970) and made his directorial debut the B-Movie Sweet Kill (1973), where he lacked creative control to fulfill his vision. While Hanson continued directing, he rose to prominence screenwriting critically acclaimed films such as The Silent Partner (1978), White Dog (1982), and Never Cry Wolf (1983).

After working on projects that kept him unsatisfied, he decided that he should write and direct thriller films based on the success of The Silent Partner. Hence, he followed up with The Bedroom Window (1987) where his writing and directing finally came to merge. By this point, his body of work made an impression on screenwriter David Koepp, who was convinced that he could handle the directorial duties for his script, which led to Bad Influence (1990). Finally he directed The Hand That Rocks the Cradle (1992), which was both a critical and commercial success.

Moving forward he directed the thriller The River Wild (1994), which grossed $94.2 million. Afterwards, he directed the acclaimed neo-noir crime film L.A. Confidential (1997) earning him the Academy Award for Best Adapted Screenplay as well as nominations for Best Picture and Best Director. The film was also nominated for the Palme d'Or at the 1997 Cannes Film Festival and is preserved by the Library of Congress in the National Film Registry as "culturally, historically, or aesthetically significant".

His next directorial effort was the critically acclaimed comedy-drama Wonder Boys (2000). Then came the hip-hop drama 8 Mile (2002), starring rapper Eminem and based on his life experiences. The film was a triumph with critics and at the box-office grossing $242.9 million. Finally the romantic comedy In Her Shoes (2005), was also critically acclaimed and a financial success.

Prior to his 2014 retirement, due to poor health, Hanson directed Lucky You (2007), and Chasing Mavericks (2012), both had troubled productions and the final results did not come near his previous critical and financial accomplishments. Hanson's last significant directorial effort was the HBO television film Too Big to Fail (2011) receiving nominations for the Primetime Emmy Award for Outstanding Limited Series or Movie and Outstanding Directing for a Limited Series or Movie. Hanson died of natural causes in 2016.

== Early life ==
Hanson was born in Reno, Nevada, and grew up in Los Angeles. He was the son of Beverly June Curtis, a real estate agent, and Wilbur Hale "Bill" Hanson, a teacher. Hanson dropped out of high school, finding work as a freelance photographer and editor for Cinema magazine.

== Film career ==
=== 1970 to 1982: early writing and directing efforts ===
Hanson's first produced screenwriting credit was on The Dunwich Horror, a 1970 film adaptation of H.P. Lovecraft's short story, by American International Pictures.

In 1973, Hanson wrote and directed his first feature, Sweet Kill starring Tab Hunter. The film came about when Hanson approached the executive producer Roger Corman about the possibility of writing and directing a film for him. Corman replied he might also be interested in a modern horror film along the lines of Psycho (1960). Hanson wrote the script originally with the killer as a female. Corman liked it but felt it was "a little too different" for the killer to be female so asked she be turned male. According to Hanson, the film cost $130,000 and Corman was supposed to put up two-thirds of the money. After Corman decided to only put up a third, Hanson said "I went to my parents and persuaded them to put a mortgage on their home in order to finance this film." After creative interference from Corman, Hanson later described the experience as a "very unhappy" one.

That same year, Hanson, with the pseudonym Edward Collins, shot a film called And God Bless Grandma and Grandpa. Producer Peter S. Traynor wanted to shoot new scenes. Which he did with actor Dean Jagger, in 1974, who played a character named "Dr. Shagetz." It was renamed God Bless Dr. Shagetz. In 1975, a litigation started between Traynor and the film's financial investors. It is rumored that with the name God Bless Dr. Shagetz, it had limited released in 1977. In 1983, a producer named Mardi Rustam, bought the films rights and shot new footage. In 1985, Rusham's version was released as a direct to video title name Evil Town.

In 1978, Hanson wrote and was an associate producer for Daryl Duke's Canadian film The Silent Partner. The film came about when Hanson was being asked to direct b-level picture and decided to write something more ambitious. He said that "The Silent Partner was a film I wrote on spec. I was hoping to direct it but I didn't get the opportunity. But I ended up finishing the movie. I was brought back by the producers to do a week of pick-up shots and all of the post-production. The Silent Partner did well in Canada both critically and financially, winning several Canadian Film Academy Awards including Best Picture and Best Director. The film was a sleeper upon its US release, with Brendon Hanley of the film database Allmovie noting that the film"...stands out as one of the best sleepers of the late '70s".

In 1980, Hanson directed The Little Dragons starring Chris and Pat Petersen.

In 1982, Hanson was among the screenwriters of Samuel Fuller's White Dog. The film depicts the struggle of a dog trainer named Keys, who is black, trying to retrain a stray dog trained to make vicious attacks upon, and to kill, any black person. White Dog was a 1970 novel, whose story was purchased for use by Paramount in 1975, with Hanson selected to write the screenplay and Roman Polanski hired to direct. Before shooting commenced, Polanski had legal problems, leaving the production in limbo. Over a span of six years, the project was given to various writers and producers. By 1981, Hanson, back on board as the film's screenwriter, suggested that Samuel Fuller be named the film's director as he felt Fuller was the only one available with the experience needed to complete the film on short notice, while still doing so responsibly with regard to the sensitive material. The film was praised by critics, particularly for its treatment of racism and Fuller's directorial talents.

=== 1982 to 1994: rise to prominence and breakthrough ===
In 1982, Hanson directed Losin' It, a teen-comedy starring Tom Cruise, about teenagers going to Tijuana to visit a brothel. Hanson explains that it was "not a happy experience. A picture I'm proud of the work we all did, but it was again taken away, retitled, re-edited and music was stuck in I didn't like." The film received negative reviews from critics. It has an 18% score on Rotten Tomatoes based on 11 reviews. It opened in 180 theaters in New York and Los Angeles, opening with $437,257 for the weekend; it grossed $1,246,141 domestically.

That same year he was credited among the writers of Carroll Ballard's Never Cry Wolf. The review aggregation website Rotten Tomatoes gives the film a score of 100% based on reviews from eighteen critics, with an average rating of 7.7 out of 10. The film grossed in the US$27,668,764.

In 1986, Hanson directed the made-for-television crime drama film The Children of Times Square.

In 1987, Hanson directed The Bedroom Window starring Steve Guttenberg, Isabelle Huppert, and Elizabeth McGovern. The film came about, while Hanson was only offered teen-comedies after Losin' It and wanted to accomplish something like The Silent Partners. He explains that, when he read the novel The Witness by Anne Holden and tried to get the film rights. Already bought by Paramount, Hanson made a deal with them. Hanson says McGovern was his "only choice" for the part of Denise. Hanson decided to cast French actress Huppert for a part of an American character, who felt she added sophistication to the role. Hanson says Guttenberg was not his first choice for the lead but rather a suggestion by producer Dino De Laurentiis, due to his popularity in comedies. Hanson agreed to cast Guttenberg, when he saw the actor's enthusiasm, and his eagerness to escape typecast. Upon its original release, the film received mixed reviews from other film critics. As of April 2021, the film holds a 70% rating on Rotten Tomatoes with the consensus: "A likable cast and mostly solid story..." Of the film Hanson concluded "that was the one where my writing and directing finally merged."

In 1990, Hanson directed Bad Influence, starring Rob Lowe and James Spader. Hanson stated that the film bears similarities to his earlier movies, The Silent Partner and The Bedroom Window. He said all are about a "character who takes a step out of line. In these pictures the guy is very guilty ... and his guilt gets him in deeper and deeper. Because he's guilty he pays a terrible price, but we feel better because he paid that price and he ends up with a strict moral code he didn't have at the start of the picture." He explained that he got the directing duties because screenwriter David Koepp "was a big fan of a picture I had written called The Silent Partner. When he wrote Bad Influence, which actually had elements in it that were kind of inspired by The Silent Partner, I think this is something David would be the first to say himself, the people who financed the movie were going, "Who should we get to direct this?" As it happened, one of them was a big fan of The Bedroom Window and said, "Well, what about that guy?" and David went, "That's a great idea!" During rehearsals, a sex scandal story broke about Lowe. "I don't believe in the theory that any publicity is good," said Hanson. "For Rob's sake and the picture's sake, I wish it had never happened. The story broke shortly before rehearsals and my reaction was completely selfish. I kept wondering, 'How does this affect the movie? How does it affect his performance?' It was like a carnival atmosphere around him." Hanson said of the final result that "Bad Influence is a movie that I'm very proud of, actually. It was the first movie where I was pretty much, within the confines of budget and obvious considerations like that, I was pretty much able to follow through with this all the way to the end including the choice of music, right down to the end." Bad Influence received mixed to positive reviews from critics. It holds a 65% rating on Rotten Tomatoes based on 20 reviews.

In 1992 Hanson directed The Hand That Rocks the Cradle starring Rebecca De Mornay and Annabella Sciorra. The film opened on January 10, 1992, and grossed $7.7 million in its opening weekend. The film lasted at #1 for four consecutive weeks and by the end of its run earned $88 million in the United States and Canada and $52 million internationally, for a worldwide total of $140 million.

=== 1994 to 2005: continued success ===
In 1994, Hanson directed the adventure film The River Wild starring Meryl Streep, Kevin Bacon, and David Strathairn. It grossed $94,216,343 worldwide, earning $46,816,343 in the United States and Canada and $47,400,000 internationally.

In 1997, Hanson directed the noir film L.A. Confidential. Prior to the Warner Brothers acquisition of the James Ellroy novel L.A. Confidential, and his hiring as a writer and director, Hanson had been a long-time fan of the author. Regarding Ellroy's characters, Hanson said "What hooked me on them was that, as I met them, one after the other, I didn't like them — but as I continued reading, I started to care about them." Ellroy's novel also made Hanson think about Los Angeles and provided him with an opportunity to "set a movie at a point in time when the whole dream of Los Angeles, from that apparently golden era of the '20s and '30s, was being bulldozed."

Hanson was subsequently joined by screenwriter Brian Helgeland who had lobbied to be its writer prior to the hiring of Hanson. They worked on the script together for two years, with Hanson turning down jobs and Helgeland writing seven drafts for free. Relatively unknown Australian actors Russell Crowe and Guy Pearce were cast in leading roles, Hanson explained that he wanted to "replicate my experience of the book. You don't like any of these characters at first, but the deeper you get into their story, the more you begin to sympathize with them. I didn't want actors audiences knew and already liked." Hanson explained that due to the success of The Hand That Rocks the Cradle and The River Wild, he was "able for the first time to initiate a picture that was a personal project from the get go. Not only initiate it, but follow through with the making of it in the way that I wanted to." L.A. Confidential was a critical and commercial success. It grossed $126 million against a $35 million budget and received acclaim from critics, with praise for the acting, writing, directing, editing, and Jerry Goldsmith's musical score. It was nominated for nine Academy Awards, including Best Picture, winning two: Best Supporting Actress (Kim Basinger) and Best Adapted Screenplay. In 2015, the Library of Congress selected L.A. Confidential for preservation in the United States National Film Registry as "culturally, historically, or aesthetically significant".

In 2000 Hanson directed Wonder Boys, a comedy drama starring Michael Douglas and Tobey Maguire. Actress Elizabeth McGovern advised Hanson to work with screenwriter Steve Kloves. When he was given the writer's script for Wonder Boys and was told that Michael Douglas was interested in starring, he "fell in love with these characters – and they made me laugh." Hanson also identified with the main character and the "thing building up inside him: frustration, hunger, yearning, et cetera." One of the challenges for Hanson was to take a plot that, as he put it, "is meandering and, apparently, sort of aimless," and a character that "does things that even he doesn't really know why he's doing them," and try to create a "feeling of focus" to keep the audience interested. Another challenge the director faced was working in actual locations in very cold weather that was constantly changing. Hanson also considered Robert Downey Jr., who at the time had legal and personal problems, for a role. Downey met with Hanson where they addressed his problems. The actor demonstrated a commitment to the project and Hanson hired him. Reportedly, Downey acted professionally for the entire shoot. Hanson also contacted Dante Spinotti about working on the film in November 1998. In its opening weekend, Wonder Boys opened at No. 7 in the US and Canadian box office and grossed a total of US$5.8 million in 1,253 theaters. It went on to gross $19,393,557 there and $14,033,031 in other countries, for a worldwide total of $33,426,588. Based on a $55 million budget, the film was a box office bomb. The film received largely positive reviews from critics. Rotten Tomatoes reports an 81% rating, based on 125 reviews, with an average rating of 7.2/10. On Metacritic, the film has a 73 out of 100 score, based on 36 critics, indicating "generally favorable reviews".

In 2000, Hanson directed the music video "Things Have Changed" by Bob Dylan. The songwriter Clinton Heylin wrote "Things Have Changed" to demonstrates a close knowledge of the film Wonder Boys, for which it was written. The lyrics make reference to "dancing lessons", "the jitterbug rag" and dressing "in drag", all of which feature in the plot of the film. Hanson recalled: "I learned that Dylan might be interested in contributing an original song… So when I came back from filming in Pittsburgh, Bob came by the editing room to see some rough cut footage. I told him the story and introduced him to the characters. We talked about Grady Tripp and where he was in life, emotionally and creatively. Weeks later a CD arrived in the mail". For the music video, Hanson intercut footage of Dylan with sequences from the feature film, to suggest that Dylan was interacting with the film's characters.

In 2002, Hanson directed 8 Mile a semi-biographical hip hop drama film about and starring rapper Eminem. According to Paul Rosenberg (Eminem's manager) both Quentin Tarantino and Danny Boyle were considered to direct, while Boyle came close, Eminem felt he had a better connection with Hanson. Hanson explained that his bond with Eminem began when they discussed their shared vision for 8 Mile. Eminem's admiration for Hanson's earlier films, The Hand That Rocks the Cradle (1992) and L.A. Confidential (1997), helped build trust. Hanson noted that Eminem didn't want a vanity project; instead, he sought to be part of a meaningful film. Initially, Hanson was cautious about casting him, worried that Eminem's reputation could be a liability. He recalled a remark from actor Russell Crowe, who had previously worked with Hanson, upon hearing about the project: “Good idea, Curtis. But who are you going to get to play Eminem?” highlighting the risk of whether Eminem could carry the film as an actor. Ultimately, Hanson was won over by Eminem's natural charisma, particularly in his expressive eyes, a quality Hanson described as essential for engaging audiences and carrying the story. Hanson added that Eminem was involved in 8 Mile from the project's inception, as writer Scott Silver developed the script with him in mind. Early drafts, however, lacked a strong connection to Detroit and set Eminem's character as a hotel bellboy. Hanson reworked the script to ground it in Detroit's identity, moving the character to an automotive stamping plant, shifting the timeline to 1995, and adding elements like the local radio station and arson scenes emblematic of the city's struggles. While Eminem's input on the script was limited to initial discussions, Hanson collaborated with him closely during rehearsals, particularly on the rap battles, explaining their thematic significance as Eminem crafted lyrics, including the theme song “Lose Yourself.” Hanson emphasized authentic casting, bringing in Detroit locals and fostering a bond among the actors, most of whom were new to film. Their group name, 3 1/3, emerged organically during rehearsals, symbolizing Detroit's 313 area code and a deeper commentary on identity and unity. For Hanson, the goal was to create an authentic portrayal of this world, finding performers who could fully embody their characters. It received positive reviews, with critics praising the music and Eminem's performance. Review aggregator Rotten Tomatoes reports the film has 75% of 214 professional critics giving a positive review and a rating average of 6.7/10. Also a box office success, it opened at No. 1 in the US with $51.3 million grossed in its opening weekend and an eventual total of $242.9 million worldwide.

Also in 2002, Hanson directed Piddler on the roof an episode of the sitcom Greg the Bunny. Furthermore, he acted in Spike Jonze's Adaptation.

In 2005, Hanson directed the comedy drama In Her Shoes, starring Cameron Diaz and Toni Collette. In Her Shoes has received generally positive reviews from critics. Rotten Tomatoes reported that 75% of critics gave the film positive reviews, based on 164 reviews, with an average rating of 6.8/10. The film opened at #3 at the U.S. box office, raking in $10,017,575 in its first opening weekend. Its worldwide gross totaled $83,697,473.

=== 2007 to 2014: later projects and retirement ===
Hanson wrote, produced and directed the 2007 film Lucky You. He developed the film with his producing partner Carol Fenelon, who was a regular competitor in poker tournaments. Hanson said, "Part of the reason for wanting to make the movie was that the poker world was different, interesting, and we had an affinity for it. But the other part of it was the emotional thing. The skills at the table — and in the movie business — are different from the qualities that you want running your personal life. That single-mindedness, the aggression, the duplicity or bluffing or whatever you want to call it, the lack of sympathy..." The film was initially set for release on December 16, 2005. However, the film sat on the shelf for two years and went through numerous release date changes as Warner Bros. mandated a half-dozen different cuts of the film in response to negative test screenings. Opening the same weekend as Spider-Man 3, the film debuted at $2.7 million in ticket sales; the lowest saturated opening week since 1982. It finished its theatrical run with $8,382,477 in total worldwide revenue. The film received generally negative reviews from critics. It holds a 28% approval rating based on 141 reviews on Rotten Tomatoes.

In 2010, Hanson served as an executive producer for Win-Loss and episode of the television show Three Rivers.

In 2011, Hanson directed the television film Too Big to Fail, based on the 2009 Andrew Ross Sorkin book of the same name about the beginnings of the 2008 financial crisis. The film was produced by Hanson's production company Deuce Three Productions for HBO. The film received 11 nominations at the Emmy Awards, with Hanson being nominated for "Outstanding Directing For A Miniseries, Movie Or A Dramatic Special" and "Outstanding Miniseries or Movie."

Also in 2011, Hanson produced David Frankel's film The Big Year.

His last film was to be Chasing Mavericks in 2012. Michael Apted received director credit alongside Hanson after he took over as director during the last 15 days of principal photography, while Hanson recovered from complications arising from recent heart surgery. On Rotten Tomatoes it has an approval rating of 32% based on 81 reviews, with an average rating of 4.90/10. The site's consensus states: "It's sweet, gentle, and affably modest, but Chasing Mavericks is ultimately pulled under by an unconvincing script and a puzzling lack of energy."

In 2014, he served as an executive producer for the FX pilot Hoke, which wasn't picked up for a series.

Hanson later retired from film work and was reported to have frontotemporal dementia.

Within his career, he was an active member of the Directors Guild of America, he was a member of the Creative Rights Committee, the President's Committee on Film Preservation, and the Film Foundation.

== Influences and style ==
Hanson said that he was heavily influenced by the directors Alfred Hitchcock and Nicholas Ray. In an interview with the New York Times in 2000, Hanson stated that Ray's film In a Lonely Place was among many that he watched in preparation for the filming of L.A. Confidential.

== Personal life ==
Hanson had a son named Rio, with his partner Rebecca Yeldham.

=== Illness and death ===
In 2016, Hanson died of natural causes at his Hollywood Hills home at the age of 71. It was later reported that Hanson suffered from a rare terminal condition known as frontotemporal degeneration which he had been suffering with for "some time". Hanson was unaware of his condition as lack of awareness of the presence of the disease is a symptom in and of itself.

=== Archive ===
Hanson's professional papers are held by the Margaret Herrick Library at the Academy of Motion Picture Arts and Sciences in Beverly Hills, California.

== Filmography ==
=== Film ===
Year	Title	Functioned as			Notes
Year	Title	Director	Writer	Producer	Notes
1972	Sweet Kill	Yes	Yes	Yes	
1978	The Silent Partner	Uncredited	Yes	Assocaite	Oversaw re-shoots and post-production
1980	The Little Dragons	Yes	No	Yes	
1982	Losin' It	Yes	No	No	
1987	Evil Town	Uncredited	No	No	Footage from unfinished film And God Bless Grandma and Grandpa
1987	The Bedroom Window	Yes	Yes	No	
1990	Bad Influence	Yes	No	No	
1992	The Hand That Rocks the Cradle	Yes	No	No	
1994	The River Wild	Yes	No	No	
1997	L.A. Confidential	Yes	Yes	Yes	
2000	Wonder Boys	Yes	No	Yes	
2002	8 Mile	Yes	No	Yes	
2005	In Her Shoes	Yes	No	Yes	
2007	Lucky You	Yes	Yes	Yes	
2012	Chasing Mavericks	Yes	No	Yes	Co-director with Michael Apted

==== Writer only ====
- The Dunwich Horror (1970)
- White Dog (1982)
- Never Cry Wolf (1983)

Producer only

- The Big Year (2011)

==== Acting roles ====
- Adaptation (2002) - Susan Orlean's Husband

=== Television ===
Year	Title	Functioned as			Notes
Year	Title	Director	Writer	Executive Producer	Notes
1986	The Children of Times Square	Yes	Yes	No	Television film
2002	Greg the Bunny	Yes	No	No	Episode "Piddler on the Roof"
2010	Three Rivers	No	No	Yes	Episode "Win–Loss"
2011	Too Big to Fail	Yes	No	Yes	Television film
2014	Hoke	No	No	Yes	Failed pilot

=== Music video ===
- "Things Have Changed" for Bob Dylan (2000).

== Awards and nominations ==
Over his career he received the Academy Award for Best Adapted Screenplay as well as nominations for the Cannes Film Festival's Palme d'Or, three British Academy Film Awards, two Golden Globe Awards, and two Primetime Emmy Awards. Hanson became one of the five directors (alongside Quentin Tarantino, Steven Soderbergh, David Fincher, and Barry Jenkins) to ever sweep "The Big Four" critics awards (LAFCA, NBR, NYFCC, NSFC).

Organizations	Year	Category	Work	Result	Ref.
Academy Awards	1997	Best Picture	L.A. Confidential	Nominated	
Academy Awards	1997	Best Director	L.A. Confidential	Nominated	
Academy Awards	1997	Best Adapted Screenplay	L.A. Confidential	Won	
BAFTA Awards	1997	Best Film	L.A. Confidential	Nominated	
BAFTA Awards	1997	Best Direction	L.A. Confidential	Nominated	
BAFTA Awards	1997	Best Screenplay	L.A. Confidential	Nominated	
Cannes Film Festival	1997	Palme d'Or	L.A. Confidential	Nominated	
Critics' Choice Movie Awards	1997	Best Screenplay	L.A. Confidential	Won	
Deauville American Film Festival	1990	Critics Award	Bad Influence	Nominated	
Directors Guild of America Award	1997	Outstanding Directing – Feature Film	L.A. Confidential	Nominated	
Edgar Allen Poe Award	1997	Best Motion Picture	L.A. Confidential	Won	
European Film Award	2000	International Award	8 Mile	Nominated	
Festival du Film Policier de Cognac	1992	Grand Prix	The Hand That Rocks the Cradle	Won	
Festival du Film Policier de Cognac	1992	Audience Award	The Hand That Rocks the Cradle	Won	
Golden Globe Awards	1997	Best Director	L.A. Confidential	Nominated	
Golden Globe Awards	1997	Best Screenplay	L.A. Confidential	Nominated	
Primetime Emmy Awards	2011	Outstanding Miniseries or Movie	Too Big to Fail	Nominated	
Primetime Emmy Awards	2011	Outstanding Directing for a Miniseries or Movie	Too Big to Fail	Nominated	
Producers Guild of America	1997	Best Theatrical Motion Picture	L.A. Confidential	Nominated	
Satellite Award	1997	Best Film	L.A. Confidential	Nominated	
Satellite Award	1997	Best Director	L.A. Confidential	Nominated	
Satellite Award	1997	Best Adapted Screenplay	L.A. Confidential	Won	
USC Scripter Award	1997	Best Screenplay	L.A. Confidential	Won	
Writers Guild of America	1997	Best Adapted Screenplay	L.A. Confidential	Won	

Awards and nominations for Hanson's directed films
Year	Title	Academy Awards		BAFTAs		Golden Globes	
Year	Title	Nominations	Wins	Nominations	Wins	Nominations	Wins
1994	The River Wild					2	
1997	L.A. Confidential	9	2	12	2	5	1
2000	Wonder Boys	3	1	2		4	1
2002	8 Mile	1	1			1	
2005	In Her Shoes					1	
Total		13	4	14	2	13	2
