= Bad Influence (1990 film) =

1990 film by Curtis Hanson

- Theatrical release poster
- Directed by: Curtis Hanson
- Written by: David Koepp
- Produced by: Steve Tisch
- Starring: Rob Lowe; James Spader
- Cinematography: Robert Elswit
- Edited by: Bonnie Koehler
- Music by: Trevor Jones
- Production company: Epic Productions
- Distributed by: Triumph Releasing Corporation
- Release date: March 9, 1990
- Running time: 100 minutes
- Country: United States
- Language: English
- Budget: $7 million
- Box office: $12.6 million

Bad Influence is a 1990 American psychological thriller film directed by Curtis Hanson starring Rob Lowe and James Spader. Spader stars as a meek yuppie who crosses paths with a mysterious stranger (Lowe) and is gradually encouraged to explore his dark side. Bad Influence was the first film for which David Koepp received sole screenplay credit.

== Plot ==
As a woman lies sleeping, a man methodically removes all traces of himself from her apartment and leaves, throwing a bag of belongings into a dumpster as it is emptied.

Michael Boll, a shy, socially awkward doormat, finds important work data missing. He knows that Patterson, his dishonest coworker and rival for a senior position, has somehow hidden the data but can't prove it, let alone bring himself to accuse the man. Frustrated, he hides in his office only to be confronted by his fiancée Ruth, whose prattling about their upcoming wedding only worsens Michael's anxiety. He goes to a bar at Hermosa Beach and buys a drink for a woman who has lost her wallet. Her abusive boyfriend appears and assaults Michael. Suddenly, the man from earlier appears, threatening the boyfriend with a broken beer bottle until he leaves. Michael turns to thank his benefactor, but the man has disappeared.

At home, Michael's older brother Pismo arrives to ask for money, once again blaming a prior drug conviction for his inability to get a job. Michael is exasperated by Pismo's apathetic lifestyle but gives him the money nonetheless. Realizing his wallet is missing, Michael leaves his number at the bar then jogs to Hermosa Beach Pier. There he discovers the mysterious man, who introduces himself as Alex. They go out for drinks and, after listening to his problems, Alex tells Michael he needs to get the best of Patterson. Emboldened, Michael steals some of Patterson's data just before an important presentation and uses it as leverage to get his own data back, leaving him exhilarated.

Alex quickly introduces Michael to a life of self-indulgence, aggression, and anarchy. At an art gallery they encounter a beautiful, hedonistic woman named Claire, who Alex convinces to have sex with Michael. The next morning, Michael wakes up and discovers, to his horror, that Alex filmed the encounter, while Claire is unfazed. At a party at Ruth's parents' house, Alex tricks Ruth into watching the sex tape, causing her to break off the engagement Michael had previously admitted he didn't want. Afterward, Michael is led by Alex on a drug-fueled crime spree, culminating in an assault on Patterson, though Michael is too drunk and high to remember what happened.

At work, Michael comes to his senses when he hears his secretary gossiping about the assault. He confronts Alex, who tells him in detail what happened and that they threatened to kill Patterson to ensure his silence. Michael declares himself finished with the toxic relationship and kicks Alex out. At work, Michael wins the senior position because Patterson has withdrawn, but is too guilt-ridden to enjoy his success. He returns home to find that Alex has completely stripped his apartment. When Alex takes credit for the promotion, Michael tells him to keep the stuff and consider them even.

Alex lures Claire to Michael's apartment while Michael is at work and films himself beating her to death with one of Michael's golf clubs. When Michael returns home and sees the video, Alex beats Michael and takes both his blood-soaked jacket and the tape as insurance. Trapped, and unable to go to the police, Michael enlists Pismo's help to get rid of Claire's body in the La Brea Tar Pits. However, she is quickly discovered, and Michael finds the golf club planted in his office.

Michael sends Pismo to a floating sex party Alex had previously introduced him to. Pismo grabs a beer bottle with Alex's fingerprints and reads the driver's license of the girl he's currently seducing. Noticing this, Alex stalks Pismo back to his apartment and attacks him, but flees when Michael arrives. Michael is about to leave to kill Alex when Pismo notices Alex has rigged Michael's car to blow up. After disabling it, Pismo convinces Michael that killing Alex will only prove he's no better than him.

At the girl's Manhattan Beach apartment, Alex has sex with her and another woman before preparing to disappear again. As he grabs a plastic bag with the bloody jacket, Michael appears and holds a knife to his throat. Alex admits he was going to plant the jacket at Michael's apartment and wrestles the knife away, chasing Michael to Hermosa Pier. Alex traps him at the end of the pier, but Michael suddenly pulls a gun, lent to him by a security guard from work. Alex preens and tells Michael his belief that humanity is inherently evil, and admits to beating up Patterson while Michael was unconscious and murdering Claire. Michael calls out to Pismo, who has recorded the entire confession with a video camera. Pismo stumbles, distracting Michael, and Alex lunges at him, but Michael fatally shoots him in self-defense and his body falls into the ocean. At dawn the police, summoned by Pismo, arrive and Michael walks out to meet them, followed by Pismo carrying the video camera holding the evidence.

== Cast ==
- Rob Lowe as Alex
- James Spader as Michael Boll
- Lisa Zane as Claire
- Christian Clemenson as Pismo Boll
- Marcia Cross as Ruth Fielding
- Kathleen Wilhoite as Leslie
- Grand L. Bush as Bartender
- David Duchovny as Club Goer with Glasses
- Perri Lister as Claire's Friend
- Michael Kristick as Bouncer
- Bianca Rossini as Bumped Woman
- John de Lancie as Howard
- Warren Stanhope as Banker
- Lilyan Chauvin as Art Gallery Patron
- Rosalyn Landor as Britt
- Tony Maggio as Patterson
- Susan Lee Hoffman as Karen
- Jeff Kaake as Willie

== Production ==
The film is based on an original script by David Koepp, who had previously co-written the script for Apartment Zero. The script launched Koepp's career.

Director Curtis Hanson stated that the film bears similarities to his earlier movies, The Silent Partner and The Bedroom Window. He said all are about a "character who takes a step out of line. In these pictures the guy is very guilty ... and his guilt gets him in deeper and deeper. Because he's guilty he pays a terrible price, but we feel better because he paid that price and he ends up with a strict moral code he didn't have at the start of the picture."

When Rob Lowe originally read the script, he said "my strongest reaction on a visceral level was to Alex. But I was nervous about playing him because I felt the character didn't go through any sort of arc or metamorphosis. He ended up unredeemed, unlike the villain I'd played in Masquerade." So Lowe decided to play Michael, the protagonist. He then had second thoughts and was persuaded by Koepp to play Alex.

During rehearsals for the film, Lowe found himself embroiled in a public scandal when news broke of a videotape he had made having sex with two women, one of whom was sixteen. "I don't believe in the theory that any publicity is good," said Hanson. "For Rob's sake and the picture's sake, I wish it had never happened. The story broke shortly before rehearsals and my reaction was completely selfish. I kept wondering, 'How does this affect the movie? How does it affect his performance?' It was like a carnival atmosphere around him." It was ultimately decided to keep Lowe in the part.

Filming began in July 1989. James Spader called it "an extremely strange, peculiar thriller, and where you end up is extremely surprising. You really think you know where you're going all the way along, and boy, you're surprised just how lost you are."

== Release ==
Bad Influence was released in the United States on March 9, 1990. On its opening weekend, it came in at 4th place with $3,822,019 at the box office. Worldwide, it grossed $12,626,043 on an estimated $7 million budget.

The film was released on VHS by RCA Columbia Pictures Home Video.

The film was released on DVD on December 3, 2002 by MGM Home Entertainment.

== Reception ==
Bad Influence received mixed to positive reviews from critics. The film holds a 65% rating on Rotten Tomatoes based on 20 reviews.

Roger Ebert gave the film 3 stars out of 4, praising the script, direction, and the actors' performances. He wrote the film "is a much superior exploitation of a theme that Koepp used in his screenplay for last year's 'Apartment Zero': A passive hero falls for the spell of a virile man who enters his life under false and deadly pretenses. 'Apartment Zero' was lurid and overwrought, almost a self-parody, while Hanson's direction of 'Bad Influence' makes it into a sombre, introspective study of the relationship."

Vincent Canby of The New York Times also lauded the acting and wrote, "There's a crucial point at which the audience either will turn away from Bad Influence, or consciously elect to stick with it in spite of common sense. Until that moment, Bad Influence is a refreshing exercise in glossy decadence."

Owen Gleiberman of Entertainment Weekly gave the film a grade of B+ and said, "Hanson establishes a ripe sense of temptation. In Bad Influence, the sinful undercurrents aren't just cheap thrills. They're luridly topical — they're meant to subvert a world in which people have begun to organize their erotic lives by Filofax".

In a more critical review, Leonard Maltin gave the film 2.5 out of a possible 4 stars, describing it as a "slick, high-tech variation on Strangers on a Train." He added it "knows what buttons to push and when; Lowe is convincingly creepy, but he won't make you forget Robert Walker."

In a 2017 interview, Rob Lowe said that of all his films, Bad Influence was the project that did not get the rightful attention it deserved. "It was really ahead of its time. I'm really proud of it... It's sexy. It's weird. It's dark. The characters are great... It's also a great snapshot of underground L.A. at the beginning of the '90s. And yet it doesn't feel dated."

Curtis Hanson said he was "very fond" of the film but "it was an unhappy experience when that picture got released, because it coincided with that ridiculous Rob Lowe videotape scandal. Rob, who I thought was really good in the movie, had his performance overshadowed by this sort of tabloid approach to him and the movie... There were people who actually wrote in reviews that this picture had been put out to capitalize on the scandal. Which, of course, would have been impossible."

== See also ==
- List of American films of 1990
- List of films featuring home invasions
