= Sweet Kill =

1973 film by Curtis Hanson

- Theatrical release poster
- Directed by: Curtis Hanson
- Written by: Curtis Hanson
- Produced by: Tamara Asseyev
- Starring: Tab Hunter
- Cinematography: Daniel Lacambre
- Edited by: Gretel Ehrlich
- Music by: Charles Bernstein
- Production companies: Curtis Lee Hanson; Tamaroc Productions
- Distributed by: New World Pictures
- Release date: January 1973 (US)
- Running time: 85 minutes
- Country: United States
- Language: English
- Budget: $110,000 or $130,000

Sweet Kill (also known as A Kiss from Eddie and The Arousers) is a 1973 B-movie written and directed by Curtis Hanson. The film was Hanson's directorial debut and was executive-produced by Roger Corman. It stars Tab Hunter and was the last film of actress Isabel Jewell.

Sweet Kill poster when re-released as The Arousers

== Plot ==
Eddie Collins finds that he is unable to perform sexually with women because of repressed memories of his mother. After accidentally killing a woman while trying to sleep with her, he finds that he is able to get aroused by the dead body. This leads him into a chain of luring women into bed in order to kill them for sexual gratification.

== Main cast ==
Actor	Role
Tab Hunter	Eddie Collins
Cherie Latimer	Lauren
Nadyne Turney	Barbara
Isabel Jewell	Mrs. Cole
Linda Leider	Vickie
Roberta Collins	Call Girl
John Aprea	Richard
Rory Guy	Henry
John Pearce	Mr. Howard

== Production ==
=== Development ===
Curtis Hanson got to know Roger Corman while doing re-writes on The Dunwich Horror (1970), which Corman had helped finance. Corman had a track record of giving opportunities to first time directors and was setting up his own distribution company, New World Pictures. When Dunwhich Horror was finished, Hanson told Corman he wanted to direct a film he had written; Corman said he would be interested in financing a motorcycle movie, a women in prison movie or a nurses movie. Hanson was unenthusiastic, so Corman then said he might also be interested in a modern horror film along the lines of Psycho (1960).

Hanson wrote the script originally with the killer as a female. Corman liked it but felt it was "a little too different" for the killer to be female so asked she be turned male.

The producer, Tamara Asseyev, was Corman's former assistant.

According to Hanson, the film cost $130,000 and Corman was supposed to put up two-thirds of the money. A couple of weeks before filming started Hanson says Corman "reneged on the deal and said he would only put up one-third of the money. My producing partner and I had to raise the other two-thirds. To show how foolhardy I was, I went to my parents and persuaded them to put a mortgage on their home in order to finance this film."

In November 1970, Tab Hunter signed to make the film. Isabelle Jewel, Cherie Latimer and Rita Murrie were also cast. At this stage the film was called A Kiss for Eddie.

=== Shooting ===
Filming took place in 1971. The apartment where Tab Hunter's character lived in Venice was owned by Hanson's grandmother.

=== Reshoots ===
Hanson says when he showed the film to Corman "he said it needed more tits in it... It was my first nightmare post-production experience."

Hanson says "It was recut to some degree and more bare breasts were put into it. It was the first time I learned the lesson that I had the opportunity to learn multiple times after that which is: If you're going to risk being wrong, it's better to be wrong with your own mistakes than with somebody else's. "

"It was very low-budget and it was a really interesting script", said Hunter. "But, of course, Roger Corman had to put his own little tweaks into it (laughter). He had his own way of making motion pictures... and selling them."

== Releases ==
The film was originally released as Sweet Kill.

Box office performance was disappointing. The film was re-released as The Arousers. It arrived in Los Angeles cinemas in 1976. The Los Angeles Times said it was "made with a sensitivity and intelligence unusual for the normally lurid psycho genre."

Hanson later described the experience as a "very unhappy" one.

== See also ==
- List of American films of 1973
