= Anagram (disambiguation) =

An anagram is a word or phrase formed by rearranging the letters of another word or phrase.

Anagram or Anagrams may also refer to:

- Anagram (band), Canadian punk rock band
- Anagram Islands off Antarctica
- Operation Anagram, British police investigation into serial killer Peter Tobin
- Anagrams (game), a word game
- Anagram Sweden, film company that produced Thin Blue Line (Swedish TV series)
