= Fitzrovia (company) =

Canada's largest developer of purpose-built rentals

- Type: Privately held company
- Industry: Real estate
- Founded: 2017; 9 years ago
- Founder: Adrian Rocca
- Headquarters: Toronto, Canada
- Area served: Toronto
- Products: Purpose-built rentals
- Website: fitzrovia.ca

Fitzrovia is a Canadian real estate company. The company develops and manages purpose-built rental in Toronto and Montréal. As of 2025, it had completed, acquired, or was developing approximately 10,000 rental units across a $11-billion real estate portfolio.

== History ==
Fitzrovia was founded in 2017 by Adrian Rocca, a former executive at Tricon Residential and Apollo Global Management.

Its first completed building, the 15-story Waverley at College & Spadina near University of Toronto, was opened in 2021 with 166 units and the re-development of the historic Silver Dollar Room.

In November 2024, Fitzrovia launched the first project funded from its DevCore Fund, a roughly $1.1-billion vehicle backed by pension plans. 135 St. Clair Avenue West was acquired by Fitzrovia via a 100-year ground lease and is slated for re-development into a 49-storey apartment tower with 600 units.

In June 2025, Fitzrovia announced a national expansion of purpose-built student housing into secondary Ontario markets London, Kingston, Guelph, and Kitchener-Waterloo.

== Properties ==
=== Multi-family rental ===
Since 2017, the company has built 19 purpose-built rental buildings in Toronto. Actively leasing communities include “Waverley”, “Parker” near Yonge & Eglinton, and “Elm-Ledbury” near Queen & Church; and “Sloane” near Yorkdale Mall which opened in January 2025. At this community, Fitzrovia is targeting downsizers and older renters.

At Bloor and Dufferin, Fitzrovia is developing Marlow, a purpose-built rental community comprising three towers of 19, 22 and 32 storeys with 898 rental units. The development also incorporates the former Kent Public School, which is being restored and adapted for community and child-care uses.

Projects currently under construction include four buildings at Main and Danforth in Toronto.

=== Student Housing ===
Fitzrovia’s student portfolio operates under its Waverley brand. New projects underway include Waverley Western in London with 35 storeys, 512 units and a planned move-in date of 2029; and Waverley Queen’s in Kingston with two 10-storey buildings and 508 units on Princess Street that expect to be completed by fall 2028. Fitzrovia plans to invest $150–$200 million in each project.
