= The Silent Partner (1978 film) =

- US film poster
- Directed by: Daryl Duke
- Written by: Curtis Hanson
- Based on: Think of a Number by Anders Bodelsen
- Produced by: Joel B. Michaels; Stephen Young
- Starring: Elliott Gould; Christopher Plummer; Susannah York; Celine Lomez
- Cinematography: Billy Williams
- Edited by: George Appleby
- Music by: Oscar Peterson
- Production company: Silent Partner Film Productions Limited
- Distributed by: Pan-Canadian Film Distributors
- Release dates: September 7, 1978 (United Kingdom); November 3, 1978 (Canada)
- Running time: 106 minutes
- Country: Canada
- Language: English
- Budget: C$2,500,000 (estimated)

The Silent Partner (titled Double Deadly on home video in the UK) is a 1978 Canadian thriller film directed by Daryl Duke and starring Elliott Gould, Christopher Plummer, Susannah York and Celine Lomez. The screenplay by Curtis Hanson is based on the novel Think of a Number (Tænk på et tal) by Danish writer Anders Bodelsen.

The film is about Miles Cullen (Gould), a Toronto bank teller, who discovers a discarded holdup note revealing an imminent robbery. Suspecting the mall Santa, Harry Reikle (Plummer), Miles secretly hides $48,300 from his transactions in a lunchbox, giving Reikle only a small amount during the robbery. Realizing he's been shorted, Reikle stalks and threatens Miles.

The Silent Partner marked Carolco Pictures' first production and benefited from Canada's Capital Cost Allowance incentive, promoting domestic filmmaking. Post-production saw Curtis Hanson return to handle pick-up shots and editing after producers added a beheading scene, a decision opposed by Duke.

It won three Canadian Film Awards including Best Feature Film and Best Direction.

== Plot ==
Miles Cullen, a teller at a bank in a Toronto shopping mall (the Eaton Centre), accidentally learns that his place of business will be robbed when he finds a discarded hold up note on one of the bank's counters. Harry Reikle, a mall Santa Claus outside the bank, has a "give to charity" sign whose handwriting is similar to that on the note.

Instead of informing his bosses or contacting the police, Miles begins stashing the cash from his window's transactions in an old lunch box rather than in the bank's till. When held up at the teller's counter by Reikle, Miles hands over a small amount and then reports that he gave all the money from his day's transactions.

Reikle figures out what happened when he sees news reports of how much was stolen during the robbery. He makes violent attempts to get the money (totalling CA$48,350) that Miles has kept for himself. Reikle starts following Miles to and from his home, and making threatening calls to him.

Miles attracts the attention of bank colleague Julie Carver, who has been having an affair with the bank's married manager, Charles Packard. After escorting Julie to a Christmas party at the Packards' house, he tells her that he is attracted to her.

When Reikle breaks into Miles' apartment and trashes it looking for the money, Miles turns the tables by following Reikle and setting him up to be arrested for the theft of a delivery truck. When brought to the police station to identify Reikle in a lineup, Miles does not point him out, aware that Reikle would then implicate him in the bank robbery.

Months later, at his father's funeral, Miles meets a woman named Elaine who says she was a nurse who had been caring for his father. Elaine is actually working with the imprisoned Reikle, who wants her to keep tabs on Miles and possibly discover where he hid the money. However, by the time Elaine discovers that Miles has stashed the money in a safety deposit box at his bank, Reikle no longer trusts her, correctly deducing that she has become romantically involved with Miles. Julie, meanwhile, has begun to suspect something about Miles and his new girlfriend.

Reikle is released from jail and confronts Elaine over where her loyalties lie. She admits that she has fallen in love with Miles. Enraged, Reikle decapitates her in a broken fishtank in Miles' apartment. After discovering what Reikle has done to Elaine, Miles disposes of her body in the foundation of the bank's new building under construction. Reikle, having watched Miles do so, congratulates him on his cleverness, but threatens to kill him unless he gets the money.

Miles agrees, but insists it be handed over in a public place where no harm can come to him. They agree that Reikle will come to the bank, again in disguise, and be handed the money at Miles' window, where Miles will feel safe. The next day, Reikle arrives dressed as a woman. After Miles hands him a packet, Reikle says that he intends to kill him anyway, for all the problems Miles has caused him. Anticipating that Reikle was intending that, Miles hands him a forged recreation of the original stick-up note and shouts "he has a gun" while triggering the alarm. Shocked, Reikle shoots Miles, flees into the mall and is shot by the bank security guard. A gravely wounded Reikle tells the guard that Miles gave him the bank's money; the guard, not comprehending Reikle, responds, "Whose money did you expect?"

A wounded Miles is taken away by ambulance. Julie goes along, telling Miles that she has figured out everything. Both decide to quit their jobs and find another line of work, somewhere far away.

== Cast ==
- Elliott Gould as Miles Cullen
- Christopher Plummer as Harry Reikle
- Susannah York as Julie Carver
- Celine Lomez as Elaine
- Michael Kirby as Charles Packard
- Ken Pogue as Detective Willard
- John Candy as Simonson
- Sean Sullivan as Frank
- Gail Dahms as Louise
- Michael Donaghue as Berg
- Jack Duffy as Fogelman
- Stephen Young as Freddie
- Charlotte Blunt as Marie Packard
- Sandy Crawley as Detective Barker
- John Kerr as Detective Lowell
- Tony Rosato as Man In Bank (uncredited)

== Production ==
=== Development ===
Anders Bodelson's novel was published in 1969. The Chicago Tribune called it "an excellent suspense novel." The New York Times called it a "fine suspense tale". The film had previously been adapted twice, a 1970 Danish theatrical film directed by Palle Kjærulff-Schmidt and starring Henning Moritzen and Bibi Andersson, and a 1972 West German telefilm directed by Rainer Erler and starring Klaus Herm and Edith Schultze-Westrum.

American filmmaker Curtis Hanson wrote the script on "spec" hoping to direct but was unable to persuade the producers to allow him, as they wanted a Canadian director. Daryl Duke, who was mainly known as a television director, was hired instead.

=== Casting ===
The lead role went to Elliott Gould, who called it "the best script I've read since The Touch." Gould later said on meeting the director and discovering the project, "Daryl was wonderful. Daryl was interested in me doing it. I read the script and the book. It’s an interesting book – “Think of a Number” – it was Scandinavian. And Curtis [Hanson] bought it or optioned the book and wrote the screenplay. I recall it took me a long time to commit to it. I’m slow, you know, I try to be deliberate. Or, on the other hand, I can be extremely impulsive and go too fast. Daryl and I were quite friendly, but I remember meeting with Daryl in the boardroom at the agency ICM, and it was just Daryl and me. And Daryl said to me: “I don’t want any of you in the picture.” And I thought, A. I’m not committed to your picture yet and who do you think I am? Who are you talking about?” So you have a reference of work I’ve done before? I mean, this is going to be something new for me. And I’m going to be something, hopefully, new enough for it. But I did adore Daryl Duke and we had a very good work relationship. We talked about doing other things together. Daryl was a friend."

=== Filming ===
The film was the first to be produced by Carolco Pictures and one of the earliest films from within Canada to take advantage of the government's "Capital Cost Allowance" incentive plan, which gave production companies tax inducements to make commercial films in Canada. The film was shot entirely on-location in Toronto. One of the central locations was the then recently opened Eaton Centre, which was open throughout the shoot. Harry Reikle's hangout was The Silver Dollar Room, a well-known live music venue in downtown Toronto. Interior sets were constructed at Cinespace Film Studios in Kleinburg.

=== Re-shoots and post-production ===
According to Gould, after the film was completed, executives wanted Daryl Duke to add a beheading scene and he refused, so he was removed from the film and the scene was shot by Hanson. "I was not happy about it," said the actor. "Daryl really did a wonderful job."

Hanson later said, "I ended up finishing the movie. I was brought back by the producers to do a week of pick-up shots and all of the post-production."

== Reception ==
=== Box office ===
The Silent Partner did well in Canada both critically and financially, winning several Canadian Film Academy Awards including Best Picture and Best Director. The film was a sleeper upon its US release, with Brendon Hanley of the film database Allmovie noting that the film"...stands out as one of the best sleepers of the late '70s".

=== Critical response ===
Roger Ebert, in his March 30, 1979 review in the Chicago Sun-Times, awarded three-and-a-half of a possible four stars to the film, calling it "a thriller that is not only intelligently and well acted and very scary, but also has the most audaciously clockwork plot I've seen in a long time." Ebert described it as "worthy of Hitchcock."

Gene Siskel of the Chicago Tribune gave the film an identical three-and-a-half star grade and called it "a very entertaining caper film." He thought that the film was "predictable" but the characters "are so joyfully written and played that you don't particularly care if you can figure out what's about to happen."

Janet Maslin of The New York Times wrote, "Just as he did with Payday, Mr. Duke has put together a dense, quirky, uncommonly interesting movie, this time with a high quotient of suspense. He develops his characters firmly and fast, and populates the story with a lot of them, weighed down by the monotony of their lives but still, senselessly, always on the go."

Variety called it "one of the films that run the gamut from intrigue to violence. The excellent cast is headed by Susannah York, Christopher Plummer and Elliott Gould. It is entertaining."

Kevin Thomas of the Los Angeles Times wrote that the film was "tense and ingenious under Duke's light touch and boasts a fine Oscar Peterson score."

Gary Arnold of The Washington Post stated, "Before it takes an appalling turn for the vicious, The Silent Partner seems an uncommonly clever and gripping suspense thriller. Even after the story threatens to self-destruct, you fight the impulse to suffer a major letdown, for the sake of the swell nerve-racking time you've been having up to that point."

Jay Scott wrote in The Globe and Mail, "As a suspense picture, The Silent Partner is first class: the story is told cleanly and the coincidences don't strain credulity unduly, although I wish screenwriter Hanson had not exhausted his imagination on the plot — the dialogue clunks when it should canter."

On the review aggregator website Rotten Tomatoes, 78% of 9 critics' reviews are positive, with an average rating of 7.5/10.

=== Accolades ===
The film was nominated for 11 Canadian Film Awards (Etrogs). Even though it was the only film in competition that had not been seen by the public, it won six awards: best picture (for producers Garth Drabinsky, Joel Michaels, Stephen Young); best director (Daryl Duke); sound recording (David Lee); sound editing (Bruce Nyznik); original music (Oscar Peterson); and editing (George Appleby).

Category	Nominee	Result
Best Feature Film	Garth Drabinsky; Stephen Young; Joel B. Michaels	Won
Best Direction (Feature)	Daryl Duke	Won
Best Performance by a Lead Actor (Feature)	Christopher Plummer	Nominated
Best Performance by a Lead Actress (Feature)	Celine Lomez	Nominated
Best Art Direction/Production Design (Feature)	Trevor Williams	Nominated
Best Overall Sound	David Lee	Won

== Legacy ==
Hanson said the film later influenced Bad Influence (1990). He explains that screenwriter David Koepp "was a big fan of a picture I had written called The Silent Partner. When he wrote Bad Influence, which actually had elements in it that were kind of inspired by The Silent Partner, I think this is something David would be the first to say himself, the people who financed the movie were going, "Who should we get to direct this?" As it happened, one of them was a big fan of The Bedroom Window (1987) and said, "Well, what about that guy?" and David went, "That's a great idea!"

It was the first film from Mario Kassar, who invested half a million dollars in it. He tried to remake it but says Curtis Hanson could not do it.

Gayle Macdonald of The Globe and Mail called it "one of the few truly good films to come out of the tax-shelter heyday of the 1970s."
