= Lynda Wiesmeier =

American actress and model (1963–2012)

- Lynda Wiesmeier in Evil Town

Playboy centerfold appearance
- July 1982
- Preceded by: Lourdes Estores
- Succeeded by: Cathy St. George

Personal details
- Born: May 30, 1963 Washington, D.C., U.S.
- Died: December 16, 2012 (aged 49) Ramona, California, U.S.
- Height: 5 ft 6 in (1.68 m)

Lynda Ann Wiesmeier (pronounced WEES-myer, May 30, 1963 – December 16, 2012) was an American model and actress. She made her film debut in American Pop. Wiesmeier was selected as both cover model and Playmate of the Month for the July 1982 issue of Playboy magazine, and her centerfold was photographed by Richard Fegley. Wiesmeier also appeared in several Playboy newsstand special editions and videos, and worked steadily for Playboy for more than five years after she graced the magazine's fold-out page, first as a nude glamour and pin-up model, and then as a promotional model and a feature reporter for the Playboy Channel.

She died at age 49 in December 2012 due to a brain tumor.

== Appearances in Playboy videos ==
- Playboy: 50 Years of Playmates (2004) – archival footage
- Playboy: Video Centerfold Tawnni Cable (1991)
- Playboy: Playmates At Play (1990)
- Playboy: Wet & Wild (1989)
- Playboy: Playmate Playoffs (1986)
- Playboy: Video Playmate Review (1983)

== Filmography ==
- Evil Town (1987)
- Touch and Go (1986)
- Teen Wolf (1985)
- Real Genius (1985)
- Wheels of Fire (1985)
- Avenging Angel (1985)
- Malibu Express (1985)
- R.S.V.P. (1984)
- Preppies (1984)
- Private School (1983)
- Joysticks (1983)
- American Pop (1981)

== See also ==
- List of people in Playboy 1980–1989
- List of Playboy Playmates of 1982#July

Kimberly McArthur	Anne-Marie Fox	Karen Witter	Linda Rhys Vaughn	Kym Malin	Lourdes Estores
Lynda Wiesmeier	Cathy St. George	Connie Brighton	Marianne Gravatte	Marlene Janssen	Charlotte Kemp
