= Anagram (band) =

Canadian punk rock band

- Origin: Oshawa, Ontario, Canada
- Genres: Post punk, punk rock
- Years active: 2002–2012
- Labels: Dead Astronaut Records, Blocks Recording Club, Telephone Explosion Records
- Past members: Clayton Churcher; Matt Mason; Willy Mason; Jeff Peers; Jon Schwartz; Chris Levoir; Chris Taylor

Anagram was a Canadian punk rock band from Oshawa, Ontario, Canada later based out of Toronto. The group was known for loud, frenzied and sometimes violent live shows.

== History ==
Singer Matt Mason founded the band with his fraternal twin Willy Mason. Its members, including departures and replacements, were Matt Mason, lead vocals; Jeff Peers, bassist; Clayton Churcher, drummer; guitarist Willy Mason, singer and saxophonist Jon Schwartz, guitarist Chris Lavoir, bassist Chris Taylor and keyboardist Christopher Sandes. Their self-titled debut EP was released in late 2003.

The band's first full-length album, After Dark, was released in early 2006 to positive reviews. Andrew Steenberg of Exclaim! wrote that the album was "a lesson in how music should be played." They also released a split 12" with The Creeping Nobodies of Toronto and a 7" single in mid-2007.

In 2010, the band released their third album Majewski. It was named in memory of Oshawa musician Michal Majewski.

Of their live shows, Now wrote, "Their droning hypnotism has been known to arouse urges to violence and maybe a house fire or two."

Anagram disbanded in 2012, playing their final show at The Silver Dollar Room in Toronto.

In 2013, Churcher and the Mason brothers founded the band Surinam.

== Discography ==
=== Albums ===
- After Dark (2005), Dead Astronaut Records
- Majewski (2010), Dead Astronaut Records

=== EPs ===
- Anagram (2003), Dead Astronaut Records
- The Creeping Nobies and Anagram (Split, 2006), Dead Astronaut Records, Blocks Recording Club

=== Singles ===
- "I Didn't Want To Go Anyways" / "What a Mess" (2007), Dead Astronaut Records
- "Butcher / "Fish" (2010), Telephone Explosion Records
