= Hotel Waverly =

Hotel in Toronto, Ontario, Canada

Coordinates: 43.658275°N 79.400543°W

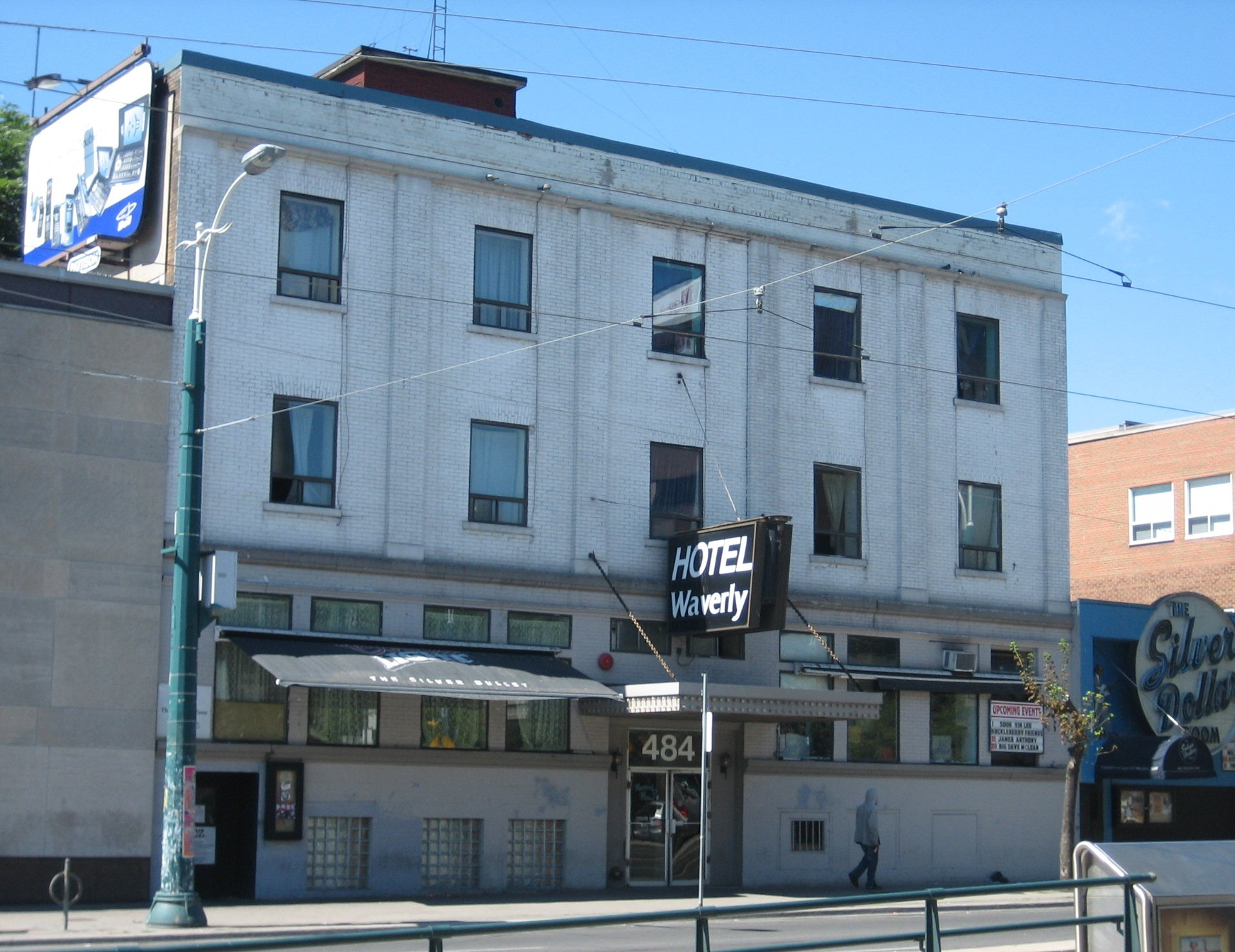
The Hotel Waverly

The Hotel Waverly was a four-storey low-rise hotel in downtown Toronto. Opened in 1900, the hotel was built for J.J. Powell. It was one of the oldest Toronto hotels in continuous operation.

== Location ==
Hotel Waverly was at 484 Spadina Avenue on the northwest corner of Spadina Avenue and College Street, adjacent to Toronto's Chinatown. It was adjacent to The Silver Dollar Room, which was added to the hotel in 1958. The Scott Mission was next door.

The hotel's central location was close to major attractions such as the Art Gallery of Ontario, Queen's Park, The Royal Ontario Museum and Kensington Market, making it a prime target for redevelopment.

== Accommodations ==
The Waverly's interior rooms were modest but comfortable. This accommodation provided low-cost housing benefiting Toronto's transient community as well as monthly residents. Its proximity to the mission kept rental rates low, attracting customers who were looking for a deal in downtown. The hotel offered 24-hour laundry facilities, free parking and a snack counter.

== Notability ==
Though he denied it, evidence points towards James Earl Ray staying at the Waverly while hiding out in Toronto after shooting Martin Luther King Jr. It was also the longtime home of poet Milton Acorn; several of his most acclaimed works depict the life in the neighbourhood. In popular culture the hotel was the setting for the opening scene of the Elmore Leonard novel Killshot and was also featured in the film version. In the 1995 Due South episode Bird in the Hand, the hotel was used as a hiding place by Gerrard after his escape during a prisoner transfer. The hotel is also briefly pictured in the music video for "Games for Days" by Julian Plenti (a.k.a. Paul Banks), and the music video for "Man I Used to Be," by Canadian musician k-os. Also used in the Canadian movie "Code 8" written by Jeff Chan and starring Robbie and Stephen Amell. It was also featured in the song "Devil's Eyes" by Buck 65.

== Closure and Demolition ==
The Wynn Group, a Toronto-based rental group and building developer, proposed to construct a 20-storey building with 202 rental units aimed at Toronto's university students. The Silver Dollar Room would be reopened on the first floor.

The hotel permanently closed in 2017. In March 2018, Fitzrovia Real Estate acquired the approved plans and site, confirming that the new purpose-built rental tower would be called "The Waverley" The hotel was demolished that summer.
