= Evil Town =

- Directed by: Curtis Hanson; Larry Spiegel; Peter S. Traynor; Mardi Rustam
- Written by: Royce D. Applegate; Richard Benson; Larry Spiegel
- Produced by: Joan Kasha; William D. Sklar; Peter S. Traynor
- Starring: James Keach; Dean Jagger; Robert Walker Jr. Doria Cook-Nelson; Michele Marsh; Christie Houser; Hope Summers; Lynda Wiesmeier
- Cinematography: Bob Ioniccio; Bill Mann
- Edited by: David Blangsted; Jess Mancilla; Peter Parasheles
- Music by: Michael Linn; Charles Bernstein (uncredited)
- Production companies: Centaur Productions; Mars Productions
- Distributed by: New World Pictures; Starmaker Video; Trans World Entertainment (TWE)
- Release date: June 2, 1987
- Running time: 88 min.
- Country: United States
- Language: English

Evil Town is a 1987 American horror film produced by William D. Sklar and Peter S. Traynor, and starring James Keach, Dean Jagger, Robert Walker, Michele Marsh and Lynda Wiesmeier. It is notable for its lengthy and troubled production, which began in 1973 and lasted until 1985, under four different directors: Curtis Hanson (credited as 'Edward Collins'), Mardi Rustam, Larry Spiegel and Traynor. Producer Peter S. Traynor was convicted of fraud related to the film's financing in 1981, six years before its eventual release. This was also the final film for Dean Jagger.

== Synopsis ==
The film depicts an evil scientist's campaign to achieve eternal youth, through synthesizing a drug derived from human pituitary fluid. In extracting the fluid, he creates mindless zombies from the donors. Because the local town residents are in on the plot, to achieve immortality, they help the scientist, by abducting visitors who come through town.

== Cast ==
- James Keach as Dr. Chris Fuller
- Dean Jagger as Dr. Schaeffer
- Robert Walker Jr. as Mike
- Doria Cook-Nelson as Linda
- Lynda Wiesmeier as Dianne
- Michele Marsh as Julie
- Christie Houser as Terrie
- Dabbs Greer as Lyle Phelps
- Regis Toomey as Doc Hooper
- Lurene Tuttle as Mildred Phelps
- Richard Hale as Lester Wylie
- Hope Summers as Mrs. Wylie
- E. J. André as Earl

== Production ==
=== Under Curtis Hanson / Peter S. Traynor ===
In 1973, director Curtis Hanson and producer Peter S. Traynor shot a film called And God Bless Grandma and Grandpa. The low-budget film was shot in Mendocino, California and starred James Keach, Robert Walker and Michele Marsh. Unsatisfied with the initial cut, Traynor fired Hanson and hired Dean Jagger to star in new scenes as a mad scientist named "Dr. Shagetz" (a minor Yiddish swear). The new scenes were shot at a studio in Hollywood. Hanson removed his name from the film and used the pseudonym "Edward Collins".

Retitled God Bless Dr. Shagetz, the film was planned for a late 1974/early 1975 release and promoted under that title in several trade publications. A rough cut was screened for entertainment journalist James Bacon. Charles Bernstein was attached to write a film score, and is listed by the AFI Catalog of Feature Films, though he is uncredited in the final version.

=== Litigation against Traynor ===
In 1975, a litigation started between Traynor and the film's financial investors. Traynor, a San Francisco investment counselor by day, had bankrolled the film by convincing 19 physicians to invest in individual films (labeled "limited partnerships") as tax write-offs. The investors claimed that Traynor had failed to promote and distribute the film per their agreement.

It is rumored that the film had a limited release in 1977, though this has never been confirmed.

In 1979, the U.S. Securities and Exchange Commission indicted Traynor for fraud. He was found guilty, and sentenced to three years in prison in 1981. The cast is recorded as U.S. v. Leverage Funding Systems, Inc., Centaurfilms, Peter S. Traynor, William G. Mcdonald, Jr. (637 F.2d 645).

=== Under Mardi Rustam ===
In 1983, producer Mardi Rustam, bought the film's rights. In an interview with the American Film Institute, he stated he didn't contact the original filmmakers or cast, to avoid opening new claims against it. Rustam stated the workprint of the film ran under 70 minutes long.

In early 1984, Rustam wrote and directed around 20 minutes of new scenes featuring Jillian Kesner and Playboy Playmate Lynda Wiesmeier, which brought the final runtime to 88 minutes. He hired Michael Linn to write a score, re-dubbed the film to change the name of Dean Jagger's character to "Dr. Schaeffer", and changed the title to Evil Town.

== Release ==
Rustam copyrighted the film under its Evil Town title in 1985, but it was not released for another two years. It received a limited theatrical release on June 2, 1987, before being released on VHS in November.

== Reception ==
Cavett Binion of All Movie Guide called it a "silly horror film" and noted that it was an assemblage of parts of earlier films, including an unfinished one from the 1970s, and that it was "spiced up with some gratuitous nudity courtesy of former Playboy playmate Lynda Wiesmeier". While remarking that the editor's efforts to maintain continuity were commendable, he concluded that "the end result seems hardly worth the effort".

== Relation to other works ==
When beginning work on Evil Town in 1984, director Mardi Rustam liked the story enough to make his own version, which he released as Evils of the Night (1985), two years before the release of Evil Town.

== See also ==
- List of films with the longest production time
