= My Uncle the Alien =

- Cover of 1996 VHS release
- Directed by: Henri Charr
- Written by: Robert Newcastle
- Produced by: Jess Mancilla
- Starring: Hailey Foster; Josh Paddock
- Cinematography: Guido Verweyen
- Edited by: Henri Charr; Jess Mancilla
- Music by: Richard McHugh; Mike Slamer
- Release date: 1996
- Running time: 90 minutes
- Country: United States
- Language: English

My Uncle the Alien (sometimes styled as My Uncle: The Alien) is a 1996 science-fiction family film directed by Henri Charr. It was released on VHS in December 1996 and intended for young audiences. The film received mixed reviews and has since been remembered as notoriously low quality.

According to Charr's personal website, My Uncle the Alien was shown at the Brussels International Festival of Fantasy, Thriller and Science Fiction Films in 1996. It was also screened at the 1996 Cannes Film Festival among other films hoping to find distributors (and not as a film competing in the festival).
