= Last of the Mohicans (1977 film) =

Made-for-TV adaptation of the novel

- Genre: Adventure; Drama
- Based on: The Last of the Mohicans by James Fenimore Cooper
- Written by: Stephen Lord
- Directed by: James L. Conway
- Starring: Steve Forrest; Ned Romero; Andrew Prine; Don Shanks; Michele Marsh; Jane Actman; Robert Tessier
- Music by: Bob Summers
- Country of origin: United States
- Original language: English

Production
- Producer: Robert Stabler
- Cinematography: Henning Schellerup
- Editor: Steve Michaels
- Production company: Schick Sunn Classic Pictures

Original release
- Network: NBC
- Release: November 23, 1977

Last of the Mohicans is a 1977 American adventure drama television film based on the novel The Last of the Mohicans by James Fenimore Cooper. The film was directed by James L. Conway, written by Stephen Lord, and stars Steve Forrest, Ned Romero, Andrew Prine, Don Shanks, Michele Marsh, Jane Actman, and Robert Tessier. It was produced by Schick Sunn Classic Pictures as part of their Classics Illustrated series, and aired on NBC on November 23, 1977.

== Cast ==
- Steve Forrest as Hawkeye
- Ned Romero as Chingachgook
- Andrew Prine as Major Heyward
- Don Shanks as Uncas
- Michele Marsh as Cora Munro
- Jane Actman as Alice Munro
- Robert Tessier as Magua
- Robert Easton as David Gamut
- Whit Bissell as General Webb

== Production ==
Parts of the film were shot in Summit County, Utah and Pipe Spring, Arizona.
