= Michele Marsh (actress) =

American actress

- Born: Michèle Noelle Buhler; 20 December 1946 (age 79)
- Occupation: Actress
- Notable work: Hodel in Fiddler on the Roof (1971 film)

Michele Marsh (born December 20, 1946) sometimes credited as Michèle Marsh, is a French-American television, theater, and film actress. She is best known for her portrayal of Hodel, the second of Tevye’s five daughters who falls in love with a student radical, in the 1971 film Fiddler on the Roof. She acted mainly in television and in West Coast theatre. She resides in Idyllwild, California, where she performed with the Idyllwild Actors Theatre.

== Early life and education ==
Marsh's father taught music theory in private schools. She and her parents moved permanently to the United States, settling in Washington, D.C. The following year, they relocated to Idyllwild, California, where her father taught in the private Desert Sun School. She attended elementary school in Idyllwild and took classes at the Idyllwild School of Music and the Arts before the family moved upstate to the Monterey Peninsula in 1959. She appeared in the musical The King and I at the Wharf Theater in Monterey, playing one of the children.

After earning her Bachelor of Fine Arts degree, she joined the American Conservatory Theater in San Francisco.

== Fiddler on the Roof ==
Marsh made her film debut in the 1971 film Fiddler on the Roof. During high school, Marsh had played one of Tevye's younger daughters, Bielke, in the play Tevye and His Daughters. In the film, she portrays the second-eldest daughter, Hodel, who falls in love with Perchik, a student radical who breaks tradition by dancing hand-in-hand with Hodel at her older sister's wedding. After Perchik asks her to marry him—another break with tradition—the couple tells Tevye that they do not seek his permission to marry, only his blessing. When Perchik is exiled to Siberia, Hodel leaves home to join him. Marsh was one of the singers of "Matchmaker, Matchmaker" and performs the solo "Far From the Home I Love".

== Acting career ==
After completing Fiddler on the Roof, Marsh moved to Los Angeles and appeared mainly in television and in West Coast theatre.

=== Television credits ===
- Love, American Style (1972)
- Mannix, episode "Lost Sunday" (1972)
- Gunsmoke, 2 episodes (1974–1975)
- The Magician (1974)
- Sandburg's Lincoln (1975)
- The disappearing dagger - Ellery Queen (1975)
- Movin' On (1976)
- The Last of the Mohicans (1977)
- The Immigrants (1978)
- The Adventures of Huckleberry Finn (1981)
- Quincy, M.E. (Season 6, Episode 13 "Who Speaks for the Children?" 1981; Season 8, Episode 21 "Suffer the Little Children" 1983)
- Little House on the Prairie (1982)
- Sledge Hammer!, 2 episodes (1986)
- Star Trek: The Next Generation, Season 1: "When the Bough Breaks" (1987)
- Highway to Heaven (1989)
- Shootdown (1989)
- Tribes (1989–1990)
- Nothing Sacred (1998)
- Memory in My Heart (1999)
- Diagnosis: Murder, 1 episode (2000)
- The West Wing (1999)
- Titus (1999–2000)
- The Dead One (2007)
- Desperate Housewives (2008)
- House, M.D., Season 8, Episode 2: "Transplant" (2011)
- Bucket & Skinner's Epic Adventures (2013)

=== Film credits ===
- Fiddler on the Roof (1971)
- God Bless Dr. Shagetz (1976)
- Tough Guys (1986)
- Evil Town (1987)
- El Muerto (2006)

== Personal life ==
Marsh lives in Idyllwild, California, with her third husband, Peter Szabadi, a retired litigation attorney.

Marsh performed with the Idyllwild Actors Theatre, and also served as a secretary/hospitality director for the group.

== Sources ==
- Benjamin, Ruth; Rosenblatt, Arthur (1993). Movie Song Catalog. McFarland. ISBN 0899507646. "marsh."
- Films and Filming. Hansom Books. 1984.
- Isenberg, Barbara (2014). Tradition!: The Highly Improbable, Ultimately Triumphant Broadway-to-Hollywood Story of Fiddler on the Roof, the World's Most Beloved Musical. St. Martin's Press. ISBN 978-1466862524.
- Patinkin, Sheldon (2008). "No Legs, No Jokes, No Chance": A History of the American Musical Theater. Northwestern University Press. ISBN 978-0810119949.
