= The Tolucan Times =

American newspaper

- Type: Monthly newspaper
- Format: Community journalism
- Founder: Betty Branch
- Editor-in-chief: Gino Renzulli
- Managing editor: Michael Argento
- Founded: 1937 (as The Canyon Crier)
- Language: English
- Website: thetolucantimesla.com

The Tolucan Times is a community weekly newspaper based in the Toluca Lake area of Los Angeles, California. Founded in 1937, it is one of the oldest newspapers in the San Fernando Valley. It covers politics and local news, as well as books, films, theatre and art reviews for the Los Angeles region. It has a readership in the Los Angeles entertainment industry, as the newspaper is carried on all of the studio lots and is featured in various production businesses.

== History ==
In 1937, The Canyon Crier, a newspaper in the Laurel Canyon neighborhood of Los Angeles, was founded. It was created by Betty Branch while her husband, Russel Branch was away serving in the military. Around 1948, Betsy and Norman Rose became proprietors. Mr. Rose previously worked as a radio writer until returning home from World War II. He quit his job and then bought the paper. The couple grew it into an eight-page tabloid with a circulation of 6,500. One local columnist described the Crier as a "New Yorker magazine with no shoes on." Another called it an "odd little example of free and enterprising journalism" that grew a national following with its brand of "personalized journalism."

The Crier hailed itself as "the only paper that makes sense." It reported on area locals and the famous residents of Hollywood and Beverly Hills alike, including Humphrey Bogart, Risë Stevens and Nelson Eddy. The paper got an exclusive interview with Eugene Ormandy, and Collier Young promised to schedule his wedding so the Crier wouldn't get scooped. The paper also reported on the problems of planting pansies in the hillside land and a opossum stealing goldfish. Around 1952, the Roses sold the Crier to publicist Jim Bishop.

In 1958, Ellis Morcos founded The Tolucan, a newspaper in Toluca Lake. In 1956, Bishop, owner of an advertising and public relations firm, sold the Crier to Richard Sharpe and his wife Gya Sharpe. Mr. Sharpe was a well-known gourmet who wrote about restaurants for several publications. As Crier publisher, a columnist said he "made life pure misery for the carless civil servant" and was "not afraid - or bound by journalist tradition - to get in there and really slug it out."

In 1968, Mrs. Sharpe sold the Crier to Ty Jurras, a publicist for the wine industry from Los Angeles. A year later John H. Eccleston was appointed editor. Jurras operated the Crier until 1977, when he sold it along with his public relations firm, moved to Vermont and opened a bed and breakfast. At some point Morcos acquired the Crier. In 1981, Hearst Communications acquired a number of community papers in southern California including The Tolucan, The Canyon Crier and The Magnolian. Those there papers were merged together to a form a single publication. In 1985, Hearst sold The Tolucan to Iraqi film producer Mardi Rustam. He soon renamed the paper to The Tolucan Times and published the paper until his death in 2023. Since Rustam's passing, the paper has been published by The Tolucan Media Group.
