= Leslie Barrett =

American actor (1919–2019 )

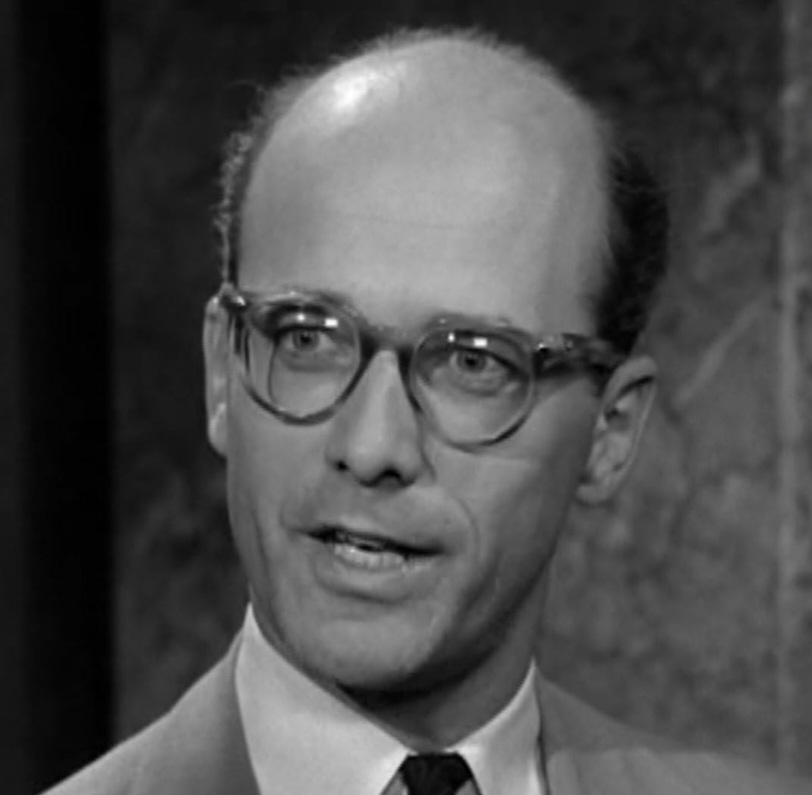
- Barrett in an episode of One Step Beyond (1959)
- Born: Leslie Klein; October 30, 1919; New York City, U.S.
- Died: June 8, 2010 (aged 90); Englewood, New Jersey, U.S.
- Occupation: Actor
- Years active: 1937–1998
- Spouses: Diana Newman Barth (divorced); Ruth W. Livingston

Leslie Barrett (October 30, 1919 – June 8, 2010) was an American actor whose career spanned Broadway, feature films and television from 1937 to 1998.

== Biography ==
Leslie Klein was born on Staten Island, New York City on October 30, 1919. His parents were Cecil and Theresa (née Leonhardt) Klein. He attended George Washington High School. He changed his name to Leslie Barrett in 1937. He had two marriages: the first to Diana Newman Barth, which ended in divorce, and the second to actress Ruth Livingston.

== Career ==
Barrett made his professional acting debut on January 12, 1937, under the name Leslie Klein at what was then known as the Guild Theatre. He first performed under his stage name upon succeeding Billy Halop in a production of Dead End at the Belasco Theatre. Barrett appeared in numerous original Broadway productions throughout his career, including The Primrose Path in 1939, Rhinoceros in 1961, and The Dresser in 1981.

In 1952, Barrett and Paul Curtis formed the American Mime Theatre. He was an accomplished Shakespearean actor. He joined the Shakespeare Theatre Workshop under the direction of Joseph Papp in April 1955. He appeared in Much Ado About Nothing and As You Like It at the Westport Country Playhouse later that year, and The Taming of the Shrew at the Walnut Street Theatre in 1974.

Barrett appeared on television as early as 1949. He appeared in four (4) episodes of The Philco Television Playhouse from 1949-53. In 1960, he performed in an episode of The Twilight Zone and on NBC's Startime in the Alfred Hitchcock- directed Incident at a Corner. In 1964, he appeared in an episode of East Side/West Side. In 1962, he appeared in an episode of Dennis the Menace playing the new principal "Mr. Spivey". He played Judge Hanley who presided over the trial of Victoria Winters for witchcraft on the soap opera Dark Shadows. Barrett may be best known as George, Harvey's best friend from The Honeymooners episode "The Bensonhurst Bomber".

== Partial filmography ==
- Career (1959) - Kensington's Assistant (uncredited)
- Preppies (1984) - Dean Flossmore
- Death Mask (1984) - Albert Dalton
