= The Bedroom Window (1987 film) =

1987 film by Curtis Hanson

- Theatrical release poster
- Directed by: Curtis Hanson
- Screenplay by: Curtis Hanson
- Based on: The Witnesses by Anne Holden
- Produced by: Martha Schumacher
- Starring: Steve Guttenberg; Elizabeth McGovern; Isabelle Huppert
- Cinematography: Gilbert Taylor
- Edited by: Scott Conrad
- Music by: Michael Shrieve; Patrick Gleeson
- Distributed by: De Laurentiis Entertainment Group (USA); 20th Century Fox (International)
- Release date: January 16, 1987
- Running time: 113 minutes
- Country: United States
- Language: English
- Budget: $8.3 million
- Box office: $12.6 million

The Bedroom Window is a 1987 American neo-noir psychological thriller film written and directed by Curtis Hanson, and based on the novel The Witnesses by Anne Holden. It stars Steve Guttenberg, Elizabeth McGovern and Isabelle Huppert.

The film is about Terry (Guttenberg) who is having an affair with his boss's wife, Sylvia (Huppert), which leads to a dangerous web of lies and murder. Sylvia witnesses an attack on a woman from Terry's apartment window, but to protect her, Terry falsely claims he saw it himself which then escalates into nightmare.

The production began with Hanson's desire to create a film similar to his earlier thriller The Silent Partner (1978). Hanson adapted the novel The Witnesses, acquiring the rights from Paramount, and made significant changes, including adding the character of Denise. Elizabeth McGovern was Hanson’s first choice for Denise, seeing her as a perfect fit to shift from victim to aggressor. Isabelle Huppert was cast as Sylvia, bringing a sophisticated, glamorous contrast to Denise. Guttenberg, suggested by producer Dino De Laurentiis, was chosen for the lead role after demonstrating enthusiasm for the part, despite not being Hanson's initial pick. Filming took place in Baltimore’s Mount Vernon neighborhood and at DEG Studios in Wilmington, North Carolina, blending atmospheric locations with studio work.

The film garnered a mix of reactions, with many critics highlighting its strong performances and solid story, though some felt it relied too heavily on familiar tropes. The Bedroom Window grossed $12.6 million at the box office and spent its first three weeks in the Top 10.

== Plot ==
Terry asks his boss's wife Sylvia to his apartment after an office party and the two go to bed. Later, while he is in the bathroom, she hears screams outside and goes naked to the window. Seeing a man attacking a young woman, she opens the window and the assailant runs away. When the media report the murder of a young woman near Terry's flat that night, he thinks the police should know what Sylvia saw but, to protect her, claims that it was he who was at the bedroom window.

At a police lineup, neither he nor the victim Denise is able to pick out the attacker, Carl Henderson. Despite the feeble evidence against him, Carl is put on trial for the assault and during the proceedings his lawyer proves that since Terry is short-sighted, and was supposed to be asleep - and therefore not wearing his contact lenses - when the attack occurred, that he could not have witnessed the incident. Carl goes free, leaving not only the police and the prosecution but also Denise and Sylvia aghast at Terry's ineptness.

In the courtroom, Carl recognises Sylvia as the woman at the window. Desperate to warn her, Terry finds her at a ballet performance and tells her she must go to the police, but she refuses all further involvement. As he leaves, he sees Carl's distinctive truck parked outside and rushes in again. He is too late, however, for in the dark she has been stabbed fatally and dies in Terry's arms.

He takes refuge with Denise, who first seduces him and then offers him a chance to redeem himself. She wants revenge, and with him devises a plot to provoke Carl into another attack. Disguising herself, she goes to a bar where Carl is drinking and signals her availability. Terry follows her as she leaves to go home and, when Carl attacks, the two are able to repel him. He escapes, only to be caught by the police who Terry forewarned.

== Cast ==
- Steve Guttenberg as Terry Lambert
- Elizabeth McGovern as Denise
- Isabelle Huppert as Sylvia
- Paul Shenar as Collin
- Carl Lumbly as Quirke
- Wallace Shawn as Henderson's attorney
- Frederick Coffin as Jessup
- Brad Greenquist as Carl Henderson
- Penelope Allen as Judge
- Robert Schenkkan as State Attorney Peters
- Mark Margolis as Man in Phone Booth
- Sara Carlson as Dancing girl
- Jodi Long as Cocktail Waitress
- Leon Rippy as Seedy Bartender
- Maury Chaykin as the pool player

== Production ==
=== Development ===
Curtis Hanson said the film came about, while Hanson was only offered teen-comedies after directing Losin' It (1983) and wanted to accomplish something similar to another previous project of his The Silent Partners (1978).

When he read the novel The Witnesses by Anne Holden and tried to get the film rights. They had been bought by Paramount who had them for 15 years. Hanson did a deal with the studio to write the script. His adaptation added the character of Denise, the assaulted waitress.

=== Casting ===
Hanson says Elizabeth McGovern was his "only choice" to play Denise. "Robert De Niro was obsessed with McGovern in Once Upon a Time in America. Dudley Moore was obsessed with her in Lovesick. So it's fun to have her play a part where her beauty is secondary. At a certain point she takes over the plot. She's the victim who becomes the aggressor."

In the script Sylvia was American but Hanson decided to cast Isabelle Huppert. "She gives the movie a little extra something," said Hanson. "Being French, she has a veneer of sophistication. She's glamorous and belongs to a world that he aspires to. Isabelle also added a contrast with Elizabeth, to whom Steve's character was initially unattracted."

Hanson says Steve Guttenberg was not his first choice for the lead of Terry but rather a suggestion of Dino De Laurentiis. "Dino thought that if the movie wasn't successful, at least he'd have a young person in the lead who is liked and is known for comedy," said Hanson.

Guttenberg was very enthusiastic to do the film and Hanson agreed to cast him after they had dinner together. "I thought the picture should have his enthusiasm and his humor," Hanson said. "Steve was dying to play the part. It was something different for him. He perceived his character as more of a leading man than a comedian."

=== Filming ===
The film was shot in the Mount Vernon neighborhood of Baltimore, Maryland, in Winston-Salem, NC and at DeLaurentiis' DEG studios in Wilmington, North Carolina.

== Music ==
The music for the film was composed by Michael Shrieve and Patrick Gleeson, and released as the official soundtrack album on LP in 1986.

== Reception ==
=== Critical response ===
On the review aggregator website Rotten Tomatoes, 72% of 32 critics' reviews are positive, with an average rating of 6.3/10. The website's consensus reads: "A likable cast and mostly solid story help The Bedroom Window transcend hollow Hitchcock pastiche." Metacritic, which uses a weighted average, assigned the film a score of 45 out of 100, based on 13 critics, indicating "mixed or average" reviews.

The film was met with negative feedback by Vincent Canby in The New York Times. It subsequently received mixed to mildly positive reviews from other film critics. James Berardinelli gave the film 2 out of 4 stars and called it "a promising thriller [gone] badly wrong". Jack Sommersby recommended it as "a first-rate thriller that only occasionally missteps", but reflected negatively on its story. Derek Armstrong described it as "a diligent, suspenseful thriller" with "a tense, focused story", pointing out, however, the inferiority of the third act to the rest of the film as well as loose plot threads.

=== Box office ===
In the United States and Canada, The Bedroom Window grossed $12.6 million at the box office, against a budget of $8.3 million. It spent its first three weeks in the Top 10 at the box office.
