= Mardi Rustam =

American film producer and director (1932–2023)

Mardi Ahmed Rustam (November 25, 1932 – April 30, 2023) was an Iraqi-born American film producer and director.

== Life and career ==
Mardi Ahmed Rustam was born on November 25, 1932, in Kirkuk, Iraq. He graduated from the University of Chicago with a degree in Business Administration. He also earned a Bachelor of Fine Arts from the Arts Institute/Goodman Theatre of Chicago and a Master of Fine Arts in Cinema from USC.

Rustam became the founder and president of the movie company Mars Productions in the 1960s. He has produced and directed more than 20 film and television productions in the United States and abroad. One of his films is the horror flick Evils of the Night, starring Julie Newmar and Tina Louise. He also acted in three of his own films.

In 1994, Rustam was honored with the Service Award by the Academy of Science Fiction, Fantasy and Horror Films.

A member of the Producers Guild of America, he also became publisher and editor-in-chief of the Tolucan Times, one of the oldest newspapers in the San Fernando Valley, and Entertainment Today. He also joined the Los Angeles Press Club.

In the summer of 1998, he was honored by The United Chambers of Commerce of the San Fernando Valley with its Small Business of the Year Award.

Rustam and his wife, Sarah, had two daughters. The couple lived in Toluca Lake, California. He died there on April 30, 2023, at the age of 90.

His granddaughter, Brittany Lee, is following in his footsteps. Her first short film, A Book By Its Cover, was in the San Fernando Valley International Film Festival. The film was chosen out of 500 submissions and was placed at No. 6.

== Filmography ==
| Year | Title | Director | Writer | Producer | Executive Producer | Actor | Role |
|---|---|---|---|---|---|---|---|
| 1971 | Dracula vs. Frankenstein | | | Associate | | | |
| 1971 | The Female Bunch | | | | Yes | | |
| 1972 | Lash of Lust | | | Yes | | | |
| 1973 | Pets | | | Yes | | | |
| 1973 | Tom | | | | Yes | Yes | Nancy's Father |
| 1975 | Psychic Killer | | | Yes | | | |
| 1976 | Eaten Alive | | Yes | Yes | Yes | | |
| 1980 | Mark, I Love You | | | | Yes | | |
| 1983 | Please Don't Eat the Babies | | | | Yes | | |
| 1985 | Evils of the Night | Yes | Yes | Yes | | | |
| 1987 | Evil Town | Yes | | | | | |
| 1987 | Savage Harbor | | | Yes | | Yes | Doctor |
| 1997 | James Dean: Live Fast, Die Young | Yes | | Yes | | Yes | Mario, the Maitr'D |
| 1999 | Follow Your Heart | | | | | Yes | Mr. Ahmar |
