= James Deahl =

Canadian poet and publisher

James Deahl (born 1945) is a Canadian poet and publisher. He is known for his 1987 collaboration with Milton Acorn, A Stand of Jackpine.
