= Preppies (film) =

- Directed by: Chuck Vincent
- Written by: Chuck Vincent; Rick Marx
- Produced by: Chuck Vincent
- Cinematography: Larry Revene
- Music by: Ian Shaw
- Production companies: The Playboy Channel; Platinum Pictures
- Distributed by: The Playboy Channel
- Release date: February 24, 1984
- Country: United States
- Language: English

Preppies is a 1984 comedy written and directed by Chuck Vincent. The film is ranked Number 45 in GamesRadar's 50 Best Sex Comedies, a list including "Annie Hall" and "The Graduate", and in 2013 Complex magazine rated it Number 42 in their 50 Best Raunchy Teen Comedies, above several better known major studio films.

== Premise ==
Three sexy young women are hired to ensure that three college students don't pass their final exams, which would preclude one of them from inheriting a family fortune.

== Production ==
The film was produced by Chuck Vincent as part of a slate of ten films to be made for airing on The Playboy Channel. Vincent filed a complaint with the MPAA over the use of the words "preppie" and "preppy" in the MGM/UA film Making the Grade original title The Last American Preppie. The MPAA sided with Vincent and noted Preppies had been registered with the MPAA over a year before Cannon registered the titles The Last American Preppy and The Unofficial Preppy Movie promptingMGM/UA to change the name.

== Cast ==
Filmed in Manhattan and nearby suburbs, the film has a cast of New York City based actors, several from Broadway with credits ranging from musicals (William Hardy, Peter Brady Reardon), to Shakespeare (Dennis Drake, Leslie Barrett), along with future screenwriter and director Katt Shea, the actress and model Lynda Wiesmeier, and Jerry Butler, an award-winner from earlier Vincent films, showing his versatility here in a comedic role.

- Dennis Drake as Robert 'Chip' Thompson III
- Steven Holt as Bayard
- Peter Brady Reardon as Marc
- Nitchie Barrett as Roxanne
- Cindy Manion as Jo
- Katie Stelletello as Tip
- Katt Shea as Margot
- Lynda Wiesmeier as Trini
- Jo-Ann Marshall as Suzy
- Leonard Haas as Blackwel
- Jerry Butler as Dick Foster (credited as Paul Sutton)
- Anthony Matteo as Louie
- Leslie Barrett as Dean Flossmore
- Wayne Franson as Bikini Dumont
- Myra Chasen as Corki Dumont
- Lara Berk as Kiki Dumont
- Beverly Brown as Mistress Tayna
- Lynette Sheldon as Saleswoman

== Reception ==
Variety praised the direction and said "The sight gags are often amusing." The Los Angeles Times called it "silly, crude inept soft core porn." More recently a Cashiers du Cinemart overview of Vincent's early R-rated comedies cited their "joyful embracing of sex through a bawdy, burlesque lens" that made them, once they became staples on cable, the "favorites of teenage boys in the early ’90s everywhere", and specifically praised Preppies for its "very breezy and light" tone.
