= Milton Acorn =

Canadian poet, writer, and playwright

- Born: Milton James Rhode Acorn; March 30, 1923; Charlottetown, Prince Edward Island, Canada
- Died: August 20, 1986 (aged 63); Charlottetown, Prince Edward Island, Canada
- Other name: The People's Poet
- Occupations: Poet, writer, playwright
- Spouse: Gwendolyn MacEwen (1962–1964; divorced)

Milton James Rhode Acorn (March 30, 1923 – August 20, 1986), nicknamed The People's Poet by his peers, was a Canadian poet, writer, and playwright.

== Early life ==
He was born in Prince Edward Island, and grew up in Charlottetown. He joined the armed forces during World War II at the age of eighteen.

== Career ==
During World War II, on a trans-Atlantic crossing, Acorn suffered a wound from depth charges. The wound was severe enough for him to receive a disability pension from Veterans Affairs for most of his life. He returned to Prince Edward Island and moved to Montreal, Quebec, in 1956 and was for a time a member of the Labor-Progressive Party. He spent several years living at the Hotel Waverly in Toronto, Ontario.

In Montreal, he published some of his early poems in the political magazine, New Frontiers. In 1956, he self-published a mimeographed chapbook, In Love and Anger, his first collection of poems. In the 1950s, some of his poetry was published in the magazine Canadian Forum.

He was for a short time married to poet Gwendolyn MacEwen.

In the mid-1960s, he moved to Vancouver and joined the League for Socialist Action. In 1967, Acorn helped found the "underground" newspaper The Georgia Straight in Vancouver, British Columbia. In 1969, he published his poetry collection I've Tasted My Blood.

Acorn was awarded the Canadian Poets Award in 1970 and the Governor General's Award in 1976 for his collection of poems, The Island Means Minago. In 1977, Acorn introduced the Jackpine sonnet, a form designed to be as irregular and spikey (and Canadian) as a jack pine tree, but with internal structure and integrity. Without a fixed number of lines and with varied line lengths, the Jackpine sonnet depends on interweaving internal rhymes, assonance and occasional end-rhymes.

In July 1986, he suffered a heart attack and was admitted to the hospital. Acorn died in his home town of Charlottetown on August 20, 1986, due to complications associated with his heart condition and diabetes. According to fellow poet and friend Jim Deahl, he had "lost his will to live after the death of a younger sister."

== Milton Acorn People's Poetry Award ==
In 1987, the Milton Acorn People's Poetry Award was established in his memory by Ted Plantos. It is presented annually to an outstanding "people's poet." The award was initially $250 (since raised to $500) and a medallion, modelled after the one given to Milton Acorn.

== Acorn on film ==
In 1971, Acorn was the subject of a documentary, Milton Acorn: The People's Poet, which was aired on the CBC program Thirty Minutes. The National Film Board of Canada produced two films on Acorn's life and works. The first is entitled In Love and Anger: Milton Acorn - Poet, and came out in 1984. The second is called A Wake for Milton. It was produced in 1988.

== Bibliography ==
- 1956: In Love and Anger
- 1960: Against a League of Liars
- 1960: The Brain's the Target
- 1963: Jawbreakers ()
- 1969: I've Tasted My Blood
- 1971: I Shout Love and On Shaving Off His Beard
- 1972: More Poems for People
- 1975: The Island
- 1977: The Road to Charlottetown (with Cedric Smith)
- 1977: Jackpine Sonnets
- 1982: Captain Neal MacDougal & the Naked Goddess
- 1983: Dig Up My Heart
- 1986: Whiskey Jack HMS Press (Toronto) ISBN 0-919957-21-8

== Posthumous collections ==
- 1987: A Stand of Jackpine (with James Deahl)
- 1987: The Uncollected Acorn
- 1987: I Shout Love and Other Poems
- 1988: Hundred Proof Earth
- 1996: To Hear the Faint Bells

=== Anthologies ===
- 2002: Coastlines: The Poetry of Atlantic Canada, ed. Anne Compton, Laurence Hutchman, Ross Leckie and Robin McGrath (Goose Lane Editions)

== Discography ==
- More Poems for People Audio CD reading Canadian Poetry Association, (1986 audio tape / 2001 CD) ISBN 0-919957-42-0

== Literary awards ==
- 1970 Canadian Poets' Award, more commonly known as the People's Poet Award and Medal
- 1975 Governor General's Award
- 1977 Honorary Doctorate of Law Degree (from the University of Prince Edward Island)
- 1986 Life member Canadian Poetry Association

== See also ==
- Canadian poetry
- List of Canadian poets
