= The Dunwich Horror (film) =

1970 film by Daniel Haller

- Theatrical release poster
- Directed by: Daniel Haller
- Screenplay by: Curtis Hanson; Henry Rosenbaum; Ronald Silkosky
- Based on: "The Dunwich Horror" by H. P. Lovecraft
- Produced by: James H. Nicholson; Samuel Z. Arkoff
- Starring: Sandra Dee; Dean Stockwell; Ed Begley; Lloyd Bochner; Donna Baccala; Joanne Moore Jordan; Sam Jaffe
- Cinematography: Richard C. Glouner
- Edited by: Christopher Holmes
- Music by: Les Baxter
- Production company: Alta Vista Productions
- Distributed by: American International Pictures
- Release date: January 14, 1970
- Running time: 88 minutes
- Country: United States
- Language: English
- Box office: $1,035,000

The Dunwich Horror is a 1970 American supernatural horror film directed by Daniel Haller, and starring Sandra Dee, Dean Stockwell, and Ed Begley. A loose adaptation of the 1929 novella by H. P. Lovecraft, the film concerns a young female graduate student who is targeted by a man attempting to use her in an occult ritual taken from the Necronomicon. The screenplay was co-written by Curtis Hanson, while Roger Corman served as an executive producer on the film.

The film's distributor, American International Pictures, had tentatively planned an adaptation of the Lovecraft story in 1963. Executive producer Corman hired Haller to direct, as he had previously directed several features for him, including Devil's Angels (1967). Though set in the fictional Massachusetts town of Arkham, principal photography of The Dunwich Horror took place in and around Mendocino, California in the spring of 1969. The film marked Sandra Dee's first adult role, following the break in her contract with Universal Pictures, and she envisioned the picture as a major departure from the films she had appeared in as a child and teen actor, in which she had been presented in a very wholesome way.

The Dunwich Horror premiered in Chicago in January 1970, and screened throughout the country that year, as well as internationally. Critical response was divided, with some critics praising the film's technical elements and adaptation of the source material, while others felt the performances were ineffective, and the film generally mediocre. Despite this, some contemporary film scholars, such as Alain Silver, have championed it as one of the best film adaptations of a Lovecraft literary work. Film historian Rob Craig similarly deemed it "one of the most overall successful adaptations of a Lovecraft source work ever committed to film." Aesthetically, the film has been noted for its psychedelic posterized imagery.

== Plot ==
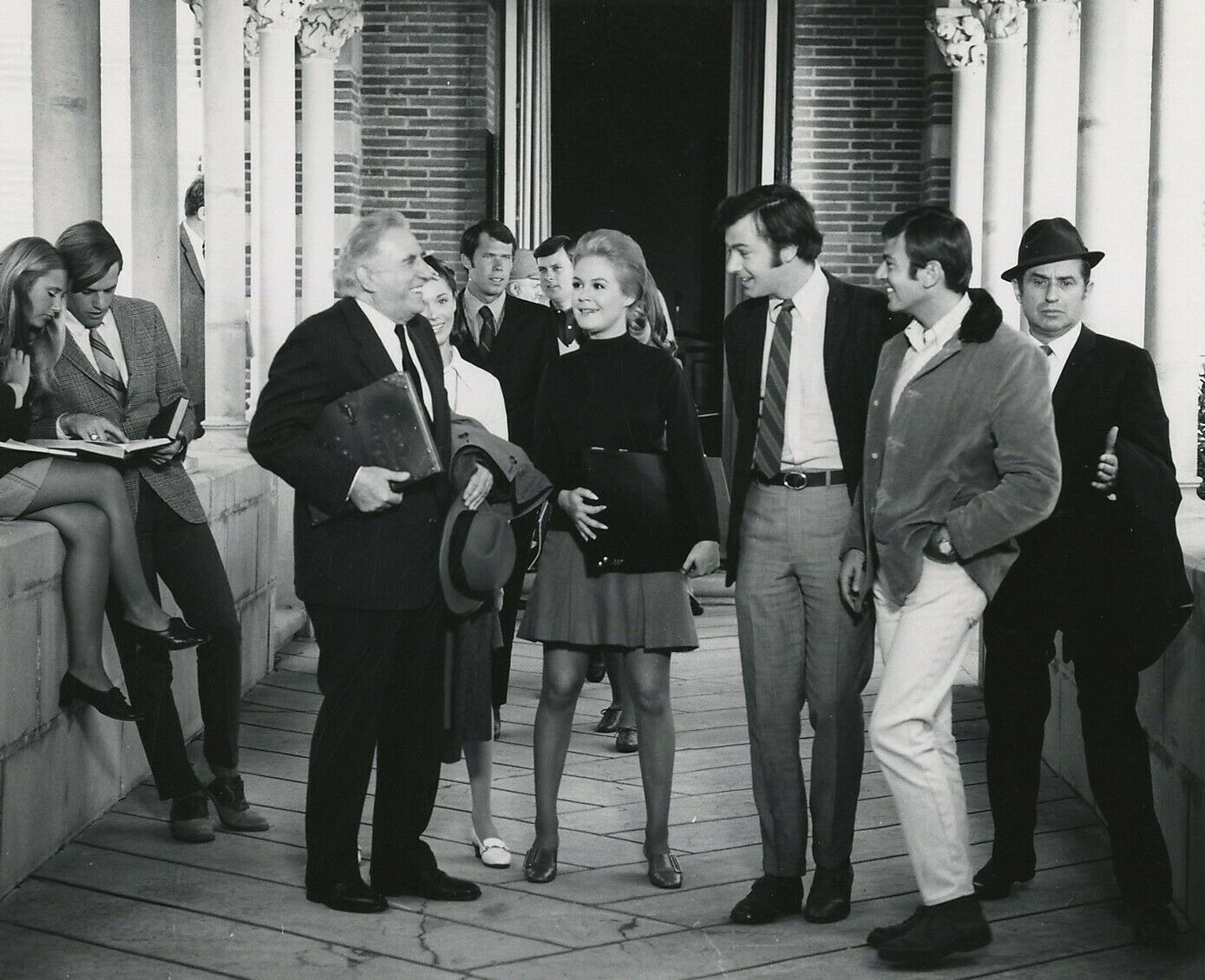
Sandra Dee (center) as Nancy Wagner

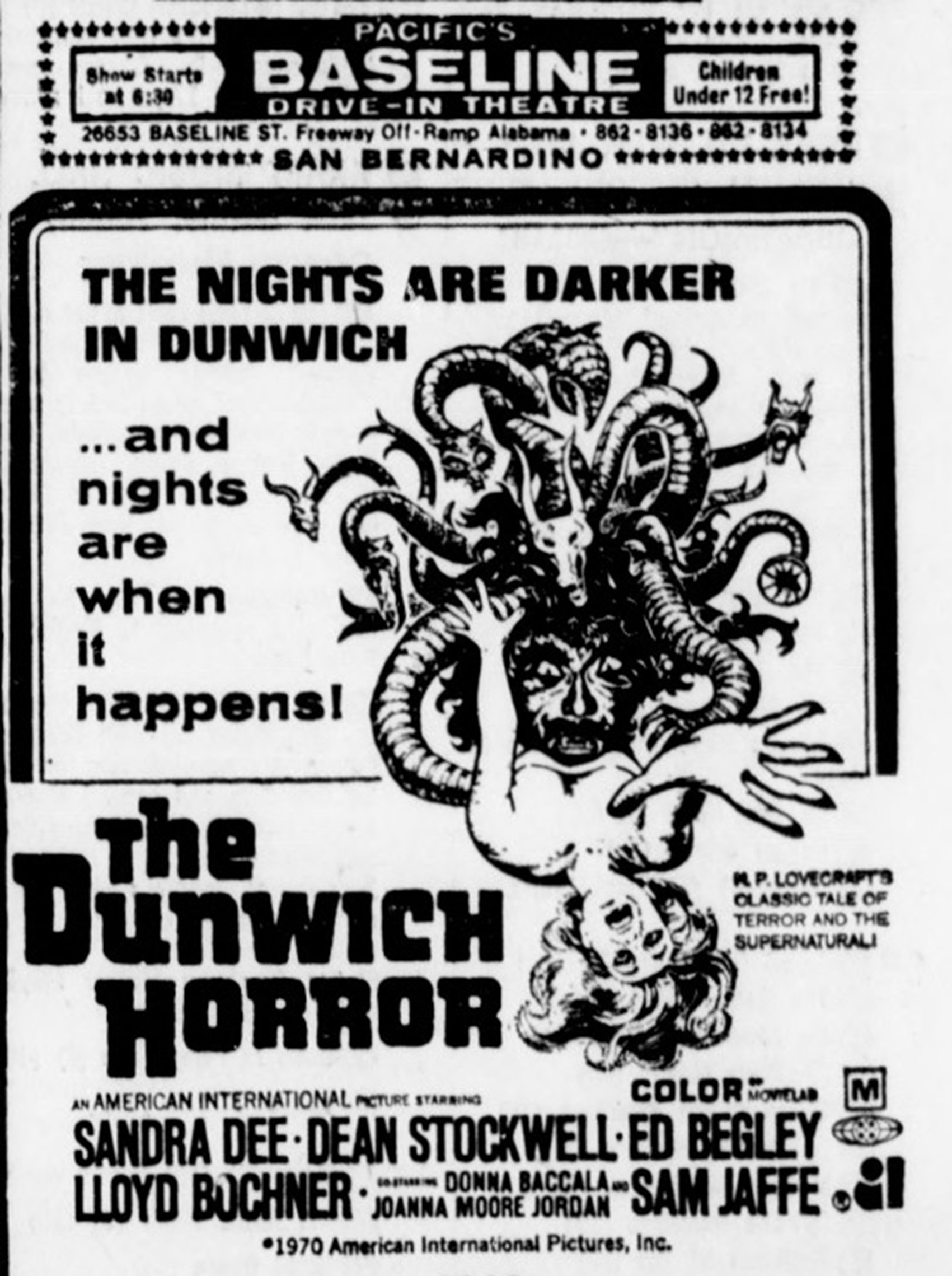
Drive-in advertisement from 1970

A woman groans and writhes with the pain of childbirth in a bedroom from a bygone era as two elderly women - who appear to be twins - and an elderly man watch. She is then led out of the room by the elderly man.

At the Miskatonic University in Arkham, Massachusetts, Dr. Henry Armitage has just finished a lecture on local history and the very rare and priceless book known as the Necronomicon. He gives the book to his student Nancy Wagner to return to the library. She is followed by a stranger, who introduces himself as Wilbur Whateley. Wilbur asks to see the book, and although it is closing time and the book is reputedly the only copy in existence, Nancy allows it under the influence of his hypnotic gaze.

Wilbur's perusal of the book is cut short by Henry, who has researched Wilbur's family's sordid past. His warnings about the Whateleys go unheeded by Nancy, who decides to give Wilbur a ride back to Dunwich after he intentionally misses his bus. At a gas station on the outskirts of town, Nancy first encounters the ill-will that the locals feel for Wilbur.

Once back at the Whateley house, she meets Old Whateley, Wilbur's grandfather. Wilbur disables her car, and then drugs Nancy. She decides under the influence of hypnosis and the drug to spend the weekend, and she does not change her mind when Nancy's classmate Elizabeth arrives with Henry from Arkham the next morning. The duo do not abandon Nancy, however. They investigate further and discover that Wilbur's mother, Lavinia, is still alive and in an asylum. Dr. Cory, the town doctor, informs Henry that Lavinia delivered twins when Wilbur was born, but one was stillborn. As he was not there for the delivery, he never saw the body. The childbirth was traumatic, during which Lavinia lost her mind and nearly died.

A drugged and hypnotized Nancy is seduced (or raped) by Wilbur on an old clifftop altar by the sea. In the meantime, Elizabeth enters the Whateley house looking for Nancy. She opens a locked door and releases a creature, Wilbur's monstrous twin, which kills her and escapes. Upon Wilbur and Nancy's return, Old Whateley confronts them about the presence of Nancy's car, and in an ensuing argument, falls down a flight of stairs and dies. Wilbur takes him to the local cemetery for a decidedly non-Christian burial, but the local townsfolk vociferously stop him.

Wilbur fights and kills a guard in the process of stealing the Necronomicon. Lavinia dies in the asylum, looking much older than her 45 years. Using the book, Wilbur prepares Nancy for sacrifice on the altar in a pagan ritual to summon "The Old Ones," during which the Whateley estate is consumed by a conflagration. Wilbur's twin runs amok in and around Dunwich, killing several people. Confronted by Armitage, Wilbur chants and calls down his demonic father as his adversary chants reverse spells. Wilbur is struck by lightning and falls into the sea.

The physically unharmed Nancy is escorted off the sacrificial altar by Armitage and Cory, who calm her by stating that the Whateley line has ended. However, Nancy is pregnant with Wilbur's ill-conceived child.

== Cast ==
- Dean Stockwell as Wilbur Whateley
- Sandra Dee as Nancy Wagner
- Ed Begley as Dr. Henry Armitage
- Lloyd Bochner as Dr. Cory
- Sam Jaffe as Old Whateley
- Joanne Moore Jordan as Lavinia Whateley (credited as Joanna Moore Jordan)
- Donna Baccala as Elizabeth Hamilton
- Talia Shire as Nurse Cora (credited as Talia Coppola)
- Michael Fox as Dr. Raskin
- Jason Wingreen as Sheriff Harrison
- Barboura Morris as Mrs. Cole
- Beach Dickerson as Mr. Cole
- Michael Haynes as Guard
- Toby Russ as Librarian
- Jack Pierce as Reeger

== Analysis ==
Film scholar Alain Silver considers The Dunwich Horror "the first geographical and architecturally apt transliteration of Lovecraft," and "more appropriate to the source material and not just a revamping of old designs from Poe films." Silver identifies one significant difference in the portrayal of Wilbur, who appears sensual and seductive in the film, whereas he is described in the story as "goatish" and uncharismatic. Scholar Rob Craig similarly notes that, in remaining true to the "spirit of the source work," the film "may be, ironically, one of the most overall successful adaptations of a Lovecraft source work ever committed to film."

Several critics have noted that the film features prominent psychedelic posterized imagery, particularly in its depiction of the disembodied energy that attacks several characters in the film.

== Production ==
=== Development ===
American International Pictures (AIP) originally announced a film version of Lovecraft's "The Dunwich Horror" in 1963. Originally, AIP had conceived an international co-production of the film between the United States and Italy, to be directed by Italian filmmaker Mario Bava and starring Boris Karloff and Christopher Lee. The film was tentatively called Scarlet Friday, following the naming trend of Bava’s previous films Black Sunday and Black Sabbath. This version of the film ultimately never came to fruition.

Daniel Haller, who was eventually hired to direct, had previously directed several films for executive producer Roger Corman, including the motorcycle film Devil's Angels (1967).

Commenting on the production, Haller noted that the production was partly inspired by the success of Rosemary's Baby (1968), but added, "We are not making a Gothic horror story. We want a much more contemporary image—one that will bring witchcraft and necromancy into an area of credibility, at least to some extent."

=== Casting ===
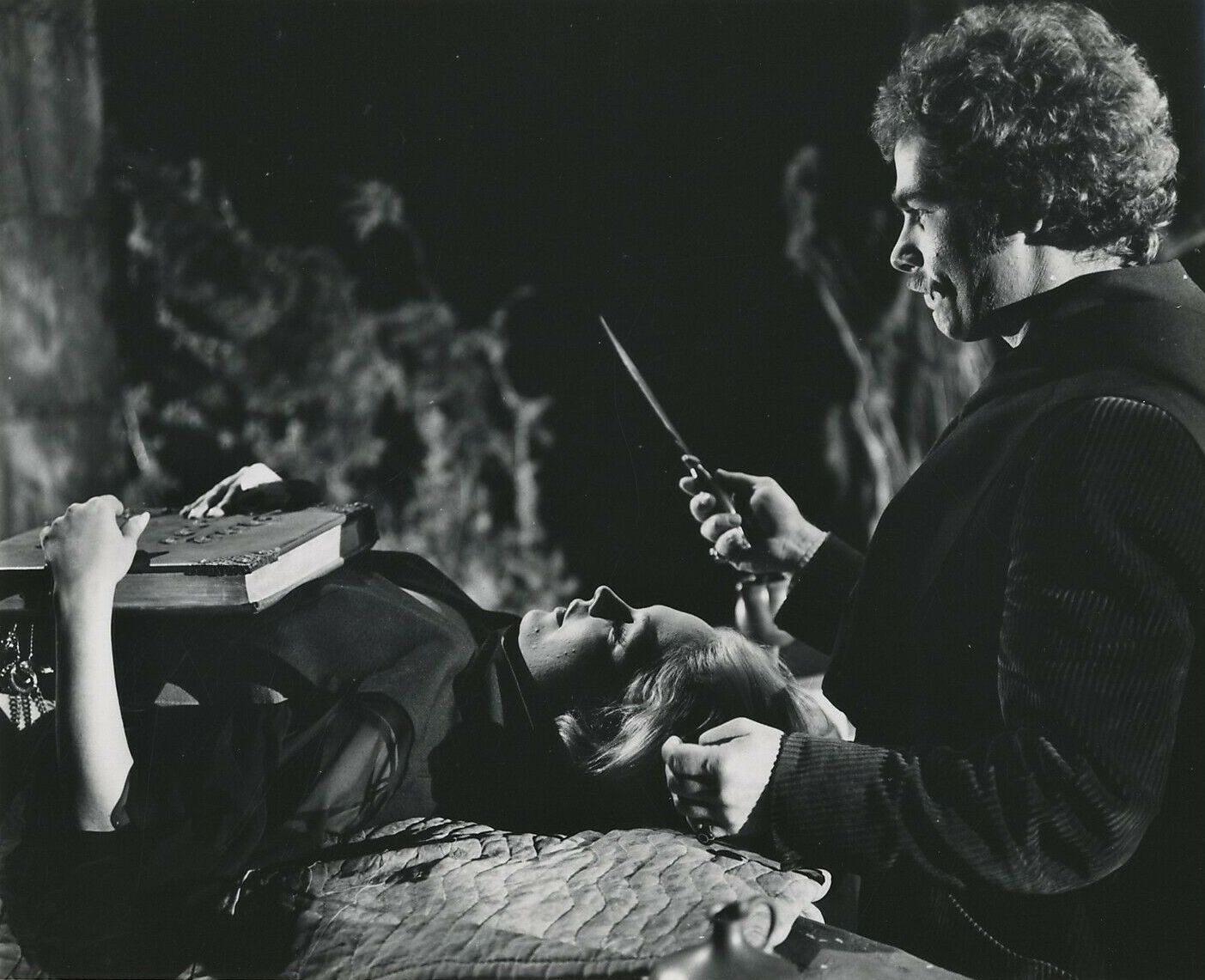
Dean Stockwell and Sandra Dee in a publicity still for the film

Sandra Dee was cast in the lead role of Nancy in April 1969, and paid $65,000 plus 5% of the profits. The role was Dee's first major part after the lapse of her years-long contract with Universal Pictures, and she saw it as a notable change of pace in her career. Dissatisfied with her previous work (Dee referred to her past 25 films with Universal as "all rotten"), she stated, "The reason I decided to do Dunwich was because I couldn't put the script down once I started reading it. I had read so many that I had to plow through, just because I promised someone. Even if this movie turns out be a complete disaster, I guarantee it will change my image." However, Dee refused to be nude in the film's final sequence, which was written in the screenplay.

Originally, Peter Fonda was cast in the role of Wilbur Whateley, but he backed out of the project and was replaced by Dean Stockwell. Both Stockwell and Dee were former child actors. This was the last film of actor Ed Begley, who died three months after its theatrical release.

Talia Shire (credited under her birth name ‘Talia Coppola’), still two years from her breakout role in The Godfather, played a supporting role as Nurse Cora. She had previously appeared in Haller’s film The Wild Racers.

=== Filming ===
Principal photography of The Dunwich Horror took place in Mendocino County, California, including the town of Little River, in the spring of 1969. The sequences set at Arkham College were filmed in the philosophy department at the University of Southern California.

== Release ==
=== Box office ===
The Dunwich Horror premiered in Chicago at the McVicker's Theater on January 14, 1970. During its first week, it grossed $30,000. The following week, on January 21, it opened in Los Angeles, then premiered in New York City on July 8 of that year. It premiered in London on September 20, 1970 as a double bill with The Oblong Box (1969). The film grossed $478,900 in 1970, per a May 12, 1971 report; however, a report in Variety from January 1971 indicated a total of $1,043,000 in U.S. and Canadian rentals.

=== Critical response ===
On Rotten Tomatoes, the film holds an approval rating of 29% based on 7 reviews, with a rating of 4.5/10.

Kevin Thomas of the Los Angeles Times praised the film, describing it as a "truly engrossing film of the supernatural that has been made with sensitivity and skill," further commending its mood and atmosphere, as well as the performances of Dee and Stockwell. John Duvoli of Cinefantastique noted that the film "is not Lovecraftian, but it is good technical film-making," also praising the special effects and score, but lambasting Dee's performance as ineffective. Ann Guarino of the New York Daily News awarded the film two-and-a-half stars out of four, noting that "Director Daniel Haller keeps interest high in the proceedings, but cannot avoid a letdown for, after all, he is dealing with the unbelievable."

Vincent Canby of The New York Times was less praiseful, writing that the film "has all the faults of Corman's various Poe adaptations (House of Usher, Pit and the Pendulum, The Masque of the Red Death), and very few of the virtues, with the exception of a beautifully Victorian interior set." A reviewer for the Syracuse The Post-Standard was similarly unimpressed, writing that "aside from being a good old-fashioned B-horror film, The Dunwich Horror has nothing startling to offer and will likely find its way to the late, late show." The Tampa Tribune's Sharon Cohen felt the film's special effects were unremarkable, and commented that all of the principal cast seemed out of place, "Ed Begley looks uncomfortable in his role... Sandra Dee, as the virgin, looks like a chubby coed whom someone found on a Hollywood movie lot. And Dean Stockwell, with his curly long hair, looks vaguely like a warlock, but never manages to exude enough scary charm to be a convincing villain."

Dennis Schwartz from Ozus' World Movie Reviews gave the film a grade C, commending the film's eerie atmosphere, but criticized its uneven presentation, and found the film to be "dull and uninspiring." Patrick Legare of AllMovie gave the film a mixed review, stating, "Everything about the film -- the performers, the hair styles, the psychedelic imagery, the music -- has late-'60s tackiness written all over it, which leaves it very dated and not very Lovecraftian." TV Guide awarded the film 2/4 stars, calling it "[a] fairly successful attempt at adapting H. P. Lovecraft for the screen." Ain't It Cool News gave the film a mixed review, commending the film's first half and Stockwell's performance, but criticized the second half as kitsch and badly written, with the final confrontation being especially ridiculous. On his website Fantastic Movie Musings and Ramblings, Dave Sindelar stated that he disliked the changes to the film that departed from the original story, and criticized the performances, and underdeveloped characters. Sindelar also highlighted the handling of the film's monster as being effective and the only aspect he liked about the film.

=== Home media ===
The film was released on DVD by MGM on August 28, 2001, and as part of a multi-disk set on September 11, 2001, then re-released as a double feature with Die, Monster, Die! on September 20, 2005.

Scream Factory released the film as a double feature on Blu-ray with Murders in the Rue Morgue (1971) in 2016.

The film received a deluxe reissue from Arrow Films on Blu-Ray with a new commentary track, featurettes focusing on the production, reactions to the film and how the film fits in with Lovecraftian mythology. The film was restored in 2K with a new scan of the original camera negative supplied by MGM.

== Remake ==
Another film version, produced by Active Entertainment Finance and Bullet Films, was released in 2009. Dean Stockwell, who played Wilbur Whateley in the 1970s film, also stars in this version, this time as Dr. Henry Armitage.

== See also ==
- List of American films of 1970

== Sources ==
- Craig, Rob (2019). American International Pictures: A Comprehensive Filmography. Jefferson, North Carolina: McFarland. ISBN 978-1-476-66631-0.
- Haberman, Steve (2016). The Dunwich Horror (Blu-ray audio commentary). Scream Factory.
- McGee, Mark (1996). Faster and Furiouser: The Revised and Fattened Fable of American International Pictures. Jefferson, North Carolina: McFarland. ISBN 978-0-786-40137-6.
- Muir, John Kenneth (2012). Horror Films of the 1970s. Jefferson, North Carolina: McFarland. ISBN 978-0-786-49156-8.
- Silver, Alain (1994). More Things Than are Dreamt of: Masterpieces of Supernatural Horror, from Mary Shelley to Stephen King, in Literature and Film. New York City, New York: Limelight Ed. ISBN 978-0-879-10177-0.
- Smith, Gary A. (2013). American International Pictures: The Golden Years. Albany, Georgia: Bear Manor Media. ISBN 978-1-593-93750-8.
