= Losin' It =

1983 American-Canadian comedy film by Curtis Hanson

- Theatrical release poster
- Directed by: Curtis Hanson
- Written by: Bill L. Norton
- Produced by: Bryan Gindoff; Hannah Hempstead; Joel B. Michaels
- Starring: Tom Cruise; Jackie Earle Haley; John Stockwell; Shelley Long
- Cinematography: Gilbert Taylor
- Edited by: Richard Halsey
- Music by: Kenneth Wannberg
- Production company: Tijuana Productions
- Distributed by: 20th Century Fox (August 1982 Test Run); Embassy Pictures (April 1983 Release); Manson International (International)
- Release dates: August 20, 1982 (Columbia); April 8, 1983 (New York); April 22, 1983 (United States)
- Running time: 100 minutes
- Countries: Canada; United States
- Language: English
- Budget: $5 million
- Box office: $1.2 million

Losin' It is a 1982 comedy film directed by Curtis Hanson, and starring Tom Cruise, Shelley Long, Jackie Earle Haley, and John Stockwell. The film follows four teenagers trying to lose their virginity. It was filmed largely in Calexico, California.

The original title for the film was Tijuana.

== Plot ==
Four teenagers from early 1960s Los Angeles are on their way to Tijuana, Mexico: Dave, Woody, Spider, and Dave's brother Wendell. Dave, Spider, and Woody are there to lose their virginity, while Wendell came along to buy fireworks. They end up picking up a woman named Kathy, who goes with them because she wants a fast divorce from her husband, and they get into a series of hijinks and misadventures south of the border.

== Cast ==
- Tom Cruise as Woody
- Shelley Long as Kathy
- Jackie Earle Haley as Dave
- John Stockwell as "Spider"
- John P. Navin, Jr. as Wendell
- Henry Darrow as Sheriff
- Hector Elias as "Chuey"
- Mario Marcelino as Pablo
- John Valby as Johnny "Hotrocks"
- Rick Rossovich as Marine
- Kale Browne as Larry
- Joe Spinell as US Customs Officer
- Santos Morales as Barker At Tongaley

== Reception ==
=== Critical response ===
The film received negative reviews from critics. On the review aggregator website Rotten Tomatoes, 18% of 11 critics' reviews are positive, with an average rating of 4.3/10. Metacritic, which uses a weighted average, assigned the film a score of 51 out of 100, based on 4 critics, indicating "mixed or average" reviews.

Gene Siskel and Roger Ebert criticized the film on their TV program At the Movies. Siskel called it "dreadful" and "predictable." Ebert described the themes of the movie as "sick" for suggesting that young men should seek out prostitutes or older women instead of forming relationships with women their own age. Janet Maslin of The New York Times praised Shelley Long for her charm and skill at physical comedy, calling her "the best thing in the movie." But she criticized the screenplay for its excesses and suggested that most of the cast "might fare much better in a different movie."

=== Box office ===
The film opened in 180 theatres in New York and Los Angeles opening with a "lackluster" $437,257 for the weekend.

== Home media ==
MGM released Losin' It as a Region 1 DVD on February 6, 2001. Kino Lorber released the film on Blu-ray on March 5, 2019.
