= Henri Charr =

Iranian film director

Henri Charr, also credited as H. Charr, is an Assyrian filmmaker born in Iran and living in Southern California. He started in educational films and documentaries, then turned to mainstream cinema in genres including thrillers, drams, action-adventure, family films and comedies.

In the early 1990s Charr made a trilogy of action films: Under Lock and Key, Caged Hearts and Cell Block Sisters. In the mid-1990s Char made family films; My Uncle the Alien was a Selection at the Brussels International Festival of Fantasy, Thriller and Science Fiction Films. He then made Little Heroes, a children's film televised on Animal Planet as the "Movie of the Month". In 2002 Charr produced and directed the Action-Adventure Disaster film Wildfire.

He then produced family adventure comedy Abe & Bruno, suspense drama Heart of Fear, and Stepping High.

== Filmography ==
=== As director ===
- Please Don't Eat the Babies (1983), a.k.a. Island Fury (USA: video title)
- Fatal Encounter (1990)
- Illegal Entry: Formula for Fear (1993)
- Under Lock and Key (1995)
- Cellblock Sisters: Banished Behind Bars (1995), a.k.a. Banished Behind Bars
- Caged Hearts (1995)
- Wild Fire (1995)
- My Uncle the Alien (1996)
- Hollywood Safari (1997)
- Little Heroes (1999)
- Little Heroes 2 (2000)
- Little Heroes 3 (2002), a.k.a. Les Petits héros III (Canada: French title: TV title), a.k.a. Top Dogs: Little Heroes 3 (UK)
- Abe & Bruno (2006) (TV)
- Heart of Fear (2006)
- Forbidden Border (2009)
- I Love Your Moves (2012)
- The Big Goofy Secret of Hidden Pines (2013)
- Stepping High (2013)

=== As writer ===
- Illegal Entry: Formula for Fear (1993) (story)
- Under Lock and Key (1995) (story)
- Cellblock Sisters: Banished Behind Bars (1995) (story), a.k.a. Banished Behind Bars
- Caged Hearts (1995) (story)
- My Uncle the Alien (1996) (story)
- Little Heroes 3 (2002) (story) Les Petits héros III (Canada: French title: TV title), a.k.a. Top Dogs: Little Heroes 3 (UK)
- Wild Fire (film) (2003)
- Abe & Bruno (2006) (TV)
- Heart of Fear (2006) (story)

=== As producer ===
- Illegal Entry: Formula for Fear (1993) (executive producer)
- Caged Hearts (1995) (executive producer)
- Under Lock and Key (1995) (executive producer)
- Hollywood Safari (2001) TV Series (executive producer)
- Heart of Fear (2006) (producer)

=== As production manager ===
- 3 Little Ninjas and the Lost Treasure (1990) (post-production supervisor), a.k.a. Little Ninjas (USA: video title)

=== As sound effects director ===
- Savage Harbor (1987) (sound effects editor) (credited as H. Charr), a.k.a. Death Feud (USA: new title), a.k.a. Raggedy Anne, a.k.a. Slammers (USA)

== See also ==
- List of Assyrians
