= Please Don't Eat the Babies =

- Directed by: Henri Charr
- Written by: David Golia; John B. Pfeifer
- Produced by: Jess Mancilla; Marcus Robertson
- Starring: Elizabeth Monet; Tanya Louise; Michael Wayne; Mike Jacobs; Joe Lombardo; Ross Hamilton; Hank Worden; Ed McClarty; Robin Haden
- Cinematography: David Golia; Vojislav Mikulic
- Edited by: Henri Charr; Jess Mancilla
- Music by: Larry Wolff
- Release date: November 1983
- Running time: 88 min.
- Country: United States
- Language: English

Please Don't Eat the Babies (also known as Island Fury) is a 1983 American horror and thriller film directed by Marcus Robertson. This music was composed by Larry Wolff. The film stars Elizabeth Monet, Tanya Louise, Michael Wayne, Mike Jacobs, Joe Lombardo and Ross Hamilton in the lead roles.

== Cast ==
- Elizabeth Monet
- Tanya Louise
- Michael Wayne
- Mike Jacobs
- Joe Lombardo
- Ross Hamilton
- Hank Worden
- Ed McClarty
- Robin Haden

== Reception ==
The Spinning Image gave the film 3 stars and concluded it was "a bizarre but oddly compelling movie." The film has also been described as a "Hokey action film about two teenage girls who, as children, accidentally" made a gruesome discovery. It addresses the topic of cannibalism. A review at Dread Central was very dismissive: "It’s joyless, soulless, and abysmal. The only good time to be found here is had by making fun of the late Eighties fashion, but even that cannot sustain for ninety minutes."
