= Vipco =

Video distribution company

Vipco's logo

Vipco (Video Instant Picture Company, sometimes stylised as VIPCO) was a video distribution company, specialising in horror and exploitation movies during the "video nasties" period in the UK. It was acquired by BayView Entertainment in 2022.

== Sources ==
- Egan, Kate (2007). Trash Or Treasure?: Censorship and the Changing Meanings of the Video Nasties. Manchester University Press. ISBN 978-0-7190-7232-1.
- McKenna, Mark (2020). Nasty Business: The Marketing and Distribution of the Video Nasties. Edinburgh University Press. ISBN 978-1-4744-5110-9.
- Hunter, I. Q.; Porter, Laraine; Smith, Justin (2017). The Routledge Companion to British Cinema History. Routledge. ISBN 978-1-315-39217-2.
- Macnab, Geoffrey (2015). Delivering Dreams: A Century of British Film Distribution. Bloomsbury Publishing. ISBN 978-0-85772-951-4.
- Simpson, James (2019). Video Nasty Mayhem: The Inside Story of VIPCO. Dark River. ISBN 9781911121701.
- Impey, Jason; McKenna, Mark (2019). VIPCO The Untold Story. Amazon Prime. Staffordshire Online Repository: 6847.
