= The Silver Dollar Room =

Live music venue in Toronto

Coordinates: 43°39′30″N 79°24′02″W

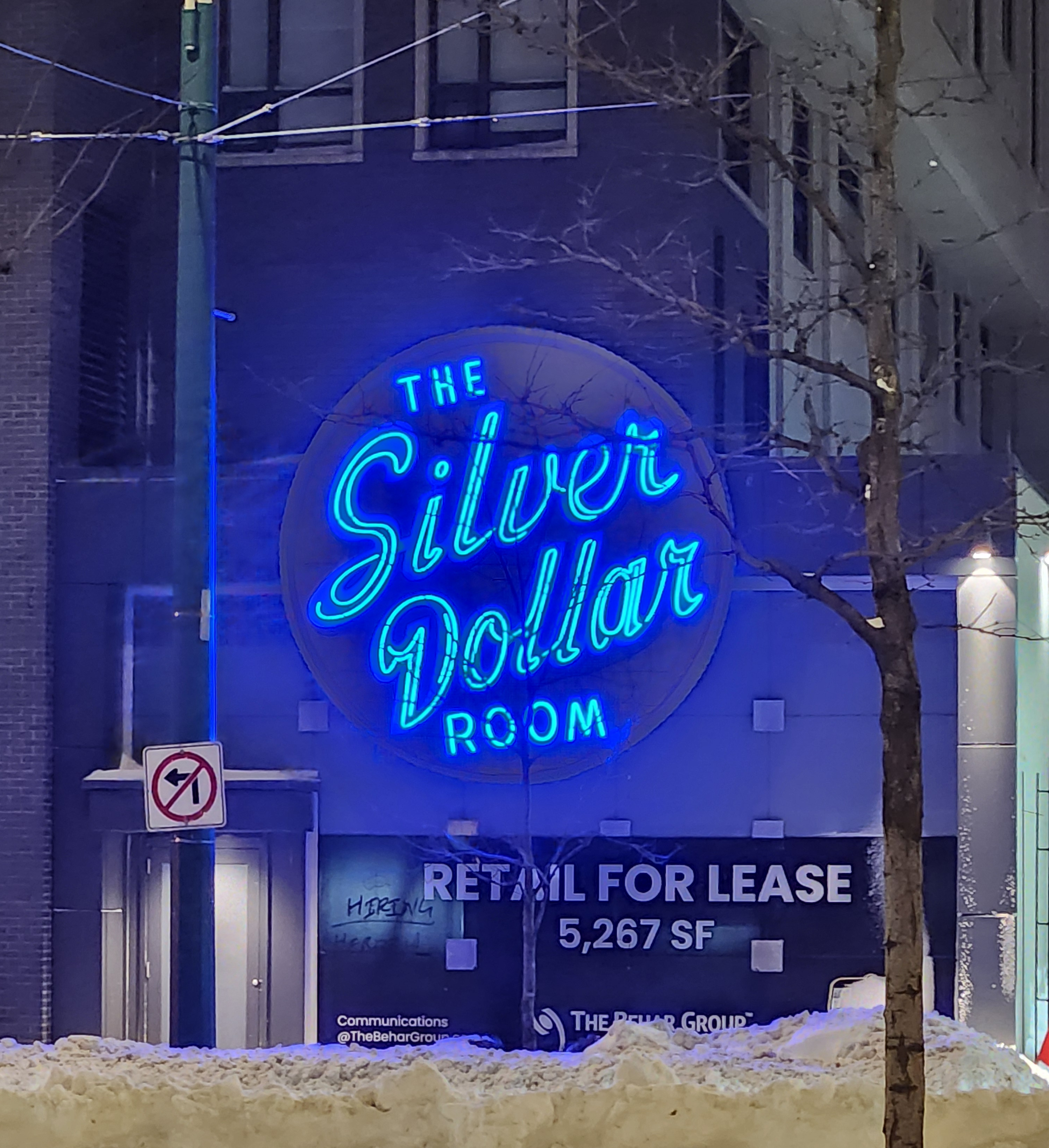
The exterior sign at the original Spadina Avenue location in February 2025

The Silver Dollar Room is a live music venue in Toronto, Ontario, Canada. Established in 1958, it was originally located next to the main floor of the Hotel Waverly, a four-storey hotel at the intersection of Spadina Avenue and College Street in downtown Toronto. Opened in 1900, the hotel was built for J. J. Powell and was one of Toronto's oldest continuously operating hotels.

The Silver Dollar Room opened on January 5, 1959, initially operating as a lounge for the Waverley Hotel. It subsequently became a venue for jazz, blues, rock and bluegrass performances. The venue received municipal heritage designation in 2015 amid plans to redevelop the property.

Over the years, the venue hosted musicians including Bob Dylan, Levon Helm, Bobby Bland, Blue Rodeo, Barenaked Ladies, Pixies and Death from Above 1979.

The venue was used as a filming location for the Blue Oyster bar, a fictional bar in the comedy film Police Academy (1984).

== Closure and redevelopment ==
The Silver Dollar Room closed at its original location on May 1, 2017, ahead of the redevelopment of the property. Under an agreement with the City of Toronto, the redevelopment was required to preserve or reconstruct designated heritage features of the venue, including its distinctive exterior sign, bar, stage, terrazzo floor and interior murals.

The original building was demolished in 2018 to make way for a 15-storey mixed-use development. The reconstructed performance space was incorporated into the ground floor of the new Waverley development. The restored Silver Dollar Room sign was reinstalled on the building's Spadina Avenue frontage in 2021.

== Relocation and successor venue ==
The Silver Dollar Room reopened in 2020 at 1371 Queen Street West in Toronto's Parkdale neighbourhood.

In September 2025, the reconstructed venue at 486 Spadina Avenue reopened as Dina's Tavern, a live music venue operated by a team associated with Toronto bars Track & Field, Bangarang and Hail Mary. The new establishment retained elements of the original Silver Dollar Room, including its layout, bar, stage and murals. Its operators stated that they intended to maintain the location's musical traditions without recreating the former venue.

In January 2026, the historic Silver Dollar Room sign at the Spadina Avenue location was covered following a trademark proceeding. The developer, Fitzrovia, stated that it was working with the City of Toronto to address the matter in accordance with the property's heritage preservation requirements.
