= List of Canadian films of 1981 =

This is a list of Canadian films which were released in 1981:

Title	Director	Cast	Genre	Notes
64,000,000 Years Ago	Bill Maylone		National Film Board animated short	
Alligator Shoes	Clay Borris	Clay Borris, Garry Borris, Ronalda Jones	Drama	
The Amateur	Charles Jarrott	John Savage, Christopher Plummer, Marthe Keller, Arthur Hill	Drama	
Being Different	Harry Rasky	Billy Barty, Sandy Allen, Jóhann K. Pétursson	Documentary	
Bush Pilot: Reflections on a Canadian Myth	Norma Bailey, Robert Lower		Documentary	
A Choice of Two	John Howe	Alexandra Bastedo, Mavor Moore, Leslie Nielsen, Gary Reineke	Drama	
Circle of Two	Jules Dassin	Richard Burton, Tatum O’Neal, Patricia Collins, Kate Reid	Drama	Dassin's last film; novel by Marie-Térèse Baird
Crac	Frédéric Back		Animated	
The Devil at Your Heels	Robert Fortier	Ken Carter	Documentary	
Dirty Tricks	Alvin Rakoff	Elliott Gould, Kate Jackson, Arthur Hill, Rich Little, John Juliani	Comedy	
Elvis Gratton	Pierre Falardeau	Julien Poulin	Short	Genie Award – Theatrical Short
Firebird 2015 AD	David Robertson	Darren McGavin, Doug McClure	Futuristic drama	
First Winter	John N. Smith	Kathleen McAuliffe, Sharon O'Neill, Eric Patrick Godfrey, Kevin Kennedy	National Film Board dramatic short	Academy Award nominee
The Followers (Les Adeptes)	Gilles Blais		Documentary	
Gas	Les Rose	Philip Akin, Susan Anspach	Comedy	
Ghostkeeper	Jim Makichuk		Horror	
Happy Birthday to Me	J. Lee Thompson	Melissa Sue Anderson, Glenn Ford, Lawrence Dane, Sharon Acker	Slasher film	
Happy Memories (Les Beaux souvenirs)	Francis Mankiewicz	Monique Spaziani, Paul Hébert, R. H. Thomson, Julie Vincent	Drama	
Heartaches	Donald Shebib	Margot Kidder. Annie Potts, Robert Carradine, Winston Rekert	Drama	Genie Award – Screenplay, Actress (Kidder), Foreign Actress (Potts)
Heartbreak High	Mark Warren		Comedy	
Heavy Metal	Gerald Potterton	Voices of Jackie Burroughs, John Candy, Joe Flaherty, Don Francks, Eugene Levy, Al Waxman	Feature animation; based on the French fantasy magazine of the same name	Genie Award – Sound, Golden Reel Award
The High Country	Harvey Hart	Timothy Bottoms, Linda Purl	Drama	
The Hot Touch	Roger Vadim		Crime comedy	
Imagine the Sound	Ron Mann	Cecil Taylor, Archie Shepp, Bill Dixon and Paul Bley	Feature documentary	A film that focuses on four musicians of the free jazz movement.
Improper Channels	Eric Till	Alan Arkin, Mariette Hartley	Comedy	Genie Award– Foreign Actor (Arkin)
The Incubus	John Hough		Horror	
Just Another Missing Kid	John Zaritsky		Documentary	Academy Award for Documentary Feature
Kings and Desperate Men	Alexis Kanner	Patrick McGoohan, Alexis Kanner, Margaret Trudeau	Drama	Featuring Margaret Trudeau, the ex-wife of Prime Minister Pierre Trudeau.
Mr. Patman	John Guillermin	James Coburn, Kate Nelligan, Fionnula Flanagan, Les Carlson	Drama	
My Bloody Valentine	George Mihalka	Paul Kelman, Don Francks, Cynthia Dale	Slasher film	Shot in Cape Breton Island coal mines
Nose and Tina	Norma Bailey		Documentary	
Not a Love Story: A Film About Pornography	Bonnie Sherr Klein		National Film Board documentary	
Off the Wall	Derek May		Documentary	
The Olden Days Coat	Bruce Pittman	Megan Follows, Doris Petrie	Drama, Christmas	
The Pit	Lew Lehman		Horror	
The Plouffe Family (Les Plouffe)	Gilles Carle	Émile Genest, Juliette Huot, Denise Filiatrault, Gabriel Arcand	Drama based on the novel by Roger Lemelin	
Porky's	Bob Clark	Dan Monahan, Mark Herrier, Wyatt Knight, Roger Wilson, Kim Cattrall, Susan Clark	Teen comedy	Golden Reel Award; made with U.S. financing
P4W: Prison for Women	Janis Cole & Holly Dale		Documentary	Genie Award – Theatrical Documentary
Quest for Fire	Jean-Jacques Annaud		Drama	
Rubberface	Glen Salzman, Rebecca Yates	Jim Carrey	Comedy	
The Running Man	Donald Brittain	Chuck Shamata, Barbara Gordon, Colm Feore, Kate Trotter	Drama	
Scanners	David Cronenberg	Michael Ironside, Stephen Lack, Jennifer O'Neill, Patrick McGoohan, Lawrence Dane	Horror/Sci-Fi	
Silence of the North	Allan King	Ellen Burstyn, Tom Skerritt, Gordon Pinsent	Drama	Genie Award – Cinematography
Stade 81	Jaco Van Dormael		Documentary	
Surfacing	Claude Jutra	Joseph Bottoms, R. H. Thomson, Kathleen Beller, Michael Ironside	Drama	Adaptation of the Margaret Atwood novel
The Tender Tale of Cinderella Penguin	Janet Perlman		National Film Board animated short	Academy Award nominee
Threshold	Richard Pearce	Donald Sutherland, Jeff Goldblum, John Marley, Sharon Acker, Mare Winningham, Mavor Moore	Medical drama	Genie Award – Actor (Sutherland), Cinematography
Ticket to Heaven	Ralph L. Thomas	Saul Rubinek, R. H. Thomson, Nick Mancuso, Meg Foster, Kim Cattrall, Jennifer Dale	Cult drama	
Top Priority	Ishu Patel	Walter Massey, Vlasta Vrana, Maureen Hill, Paula Mazzone	Animated short	
Tulips	Rex Bromfield	Gabe Kaplan, Bernadette Peters, Henry Gibson, Al Waxman	Comedy, drama	
Violet	Shelley Levinson	Didi Conn	Short drama	
A War Story	Anne Wheeler		Docudrama	
Yesterday	Lawrence Kent	Vincent Van Patten, Claire Pimparé	Drama	
Your Ticket Is No Longer Valid	George Kaczender	Richard Harris, Jennifer Dale, George Peppard, Jeanne Moreau, Winston Rekert, Alexandra Stewart	Drama	
Zea	André Leduc, Jean-Jacques Leduc		Non-fiction short	

== See also ==
- 1981 in Canada
- 1981 in Canadian television
