= 3rd Genie Awards =

1982 Canadian film awards

- Date: March 3, 1982
- Site: Royal Alexandra Theatre, Toronto
- Hosted by: Brian Linehan

Highlights
- Best Picture: Ticket to Heaven
- Most awards: Les Plouffe (The Plouffe Family)
- Most nominations: Les Plouffe; Ticket to Heaven

Television coverage
- Network: CBC Television

The 3rd Genie Awards were presented on March 3, 1982, to honour Canadian films released in 1981.

The film Les Plouffe (The Plouffe Family) won the most awards overall, although Ticket to Heaven won Best Picture. Those two films were tied for most nominations overall, with 15 nods each.

The ceremony took place at the Royal Alexandra Theatre in Toronto, and was hosted by Brian Linehan, with magician Doug Henning assisting by using card tricks and other illusions to reveal the winners.

Now that the Academy was firmly established, the 14 appointed board members from the Canadian Film Awards committee relinquished their positions. The new Academy board was set at 20—three honorary appointments and 17 members elected from participating organizations. For this year, the new board instituted the Canadian Independent Short Film Showcase for makers of short films, and the Toronto Festival of Festivals trade forum, which would eventually become the Toronto International Film Festival.

== Winners and nominees ==
Motion Picture	Direction
Ticket to Heaven – Famous Players, CFDC, Ronald Cohen Productions, Ronald I. Cohen and Vivienne Leebosh producers, Ralph L. Thomas director; The Amateur – Tiberius Films, Balkan Productions, Garth Drabinsky and Joel B. Michaels producers, Charles Jarrott director; Heartaches – Rising Star Films, Pieter Kroonenburg, David Patterson and Jerry Raibourn producers, Donald Shebib director; Les Plouffe (The Plouffe Family) – Ciné London Inc., International Cinema Corp., Justine Héroux producer, Gilles Carle director; Scanners – Victor Solnicki, Pierre David and Claude Héroux	Gilles Carle - Les Plouffe (The Plouffe Family); David Cronenberg - Scanners; Allan King - Silence of the North; Donald Shebib - Heartaches; Ralph L. Thomas - Ticket to Heaven
Actor in a leading role	Actress in a leading role
Nick Mancuso - Ticket to Heaven; Gabriel Arcand - Les Plouffe (The Plouffe Family); Gordon Pinsent - Silence of the North; Christopher Plummer - The Amateur; Winston Rekert - Heartaches	Margot Kidder - Heartaches; Kim Cattrall - Ticket to Heaven; Lesleh Donaldson - Funeral Home; Ronalda Jones - Alligator Shoes; Monique Spaziani - Les Beaux souvenirs (Happy Memories) (NFB)
Actor in a supporting role	Actress in a supporting role
Saul Rubinek - Ticket to Heaven; Nicholas Campbell - The Amateur; Émile Genest - Les Plouffe (The Plouffe Family); Michael Ironside, Scanners; R.H. Thomson - Ticket to Heaven	Denise Filiatrault - Les Plouffe (The Plouffe Family); Juliette Huot - Les Plouffe (The Plouffe Family); Chapelle Jaffe - The Amateur; Anne Létourneau - Les Plouffe (The Plouffe Family); Dixie Seatle - Ticket to Heaven
Foreign Actor	Foreign Actress
Alan Arkin - Improper Channels; Guy Boyd - Ticket to Heaven; Robert Carradine - Heartaches; Rémi Laurent - Les Plouffe (The Plouffe Family); John Savage - The Amateur; Tom Skerritt - Silence of the North	Annie Potts - Heartaches; Ellen Burstyn - Silence of the North; Meg Foster - Ticket to Heaven; Mariette Hartley - Improper Channels; Marthe Keller - The Amateur
Original Screenplay	Adapted Screenplay
Terence Heffernan - Heartaches; Adam Arkin, Morrie Ruvinsky, and Ian Sutherland - Improper Channels; Clay Borris - Alligator Shoes; David Cronenberg - Scanners; Réjean Ducharme - Les Beaux souvenirs (Happy Memories); James Sanderson and Paul Illidge - Head On	Roger Lemelin and Gilles Carle - Les Plouffe (The Plouffe Family); Diana Maddox - The Amateur; Ralph L. Thomas and Anne Cameron - Ticket to Heaven
Best Documentary	Best Theatrical Short
P4W: Prison for Women - Janis Cole and Holly Dale; Being Different - Harry Rasky	Zea - André Leduc, Robert Forget and Jean-Jacques Leduc; Top Priority - Ishu Patel; Voyage de nuit - Roger Frappier and Carole Mondello
Art Direction/Production Design	Cinematography
William McCrow - Les Plouffe (The Plouffe Family); Claude Bonniere - Your Ticket Is No Longer Valid; Bill Brodie - Silence of the North; Ninkey Dalton and Charles Dunlop - Improper Channels; Carol Spier - Scanners; Trevor Williams - The Amateur	Richard Leiterman - Silence of the North; John F. Phillips - Alligator Shoes; Vic Sarin - Heartaches
Costume Design	Editing
Nicole Pelletier - Les Plouffe (The Plouffe Family); Olga Dimitrov, Silence of the North; Huguette Gagné, Happy Birthday to Me; Julie Ganton, Heartaches; Delphine White, Scanners	Ron Wisman - Ticket to Heaven; Gordon McClellan, Alligator Shoes; Ralph Brunjes, Funeral Home; Gary Oppenheimer, Head On; Ronald Sanders, Scanners; Arla Saare, Silence of the North
Overall Sound	Sound Editing
Daniel Goldberg, Gordon Thompson, Austin Grimaldi and Joe Grimaldi Heavy Metal; Dennis Drummond, Wayne Griffin and Michael O'Farrell, The Amateur; Robin Leigh, Paul Dion, Claude Langlois and Marcel Pothier, Heartaches; Peter Burgess, Scanners; Marc Chiasson, Bruce Carwardine and Glen Gauthier, Ticket to Heaven	Peter Thilaye, Andy Malcolm and Peter Jermyn - Heavy Metal; Austin Grimaldi, Joe Grimaldi, Peter Shewchuk and Dino Pigat, The Amateur; Joe Grimaldi, David Appleby, Gary C. Bourgeois, Austin Grimaldi, Ian Hendry and Andy Herman, Funeral Home; Don Cohen and Michel Descombes, Heartaches; Michel Descombes and Patrick Rousseau, Les Plouffe (The Plouffe Family); Marc Chiasson, Glen Gauthier, Don White, David Appleby and Bruce Carwardine, Ticket to Heaven
Achievement in Music: Original Score	Achievement in Music: Original Song
Claude Denjean and Stéphane Venne - Les Plouffe (The Plouffe Family); Jean Cousineau - Les Beaux souvenirs (Happy Memories); Bo Harwood and Lance Rubin, Happy Birthday to Me; Micky Erbe and Maribeth Solomon, Ticket to Heaven	Stéphane Venne - Il était une fois des gens heureux, Les Plouffe (The Plouffe Family); Ann Mortifee, "Gypsy Born" (Surfacing); Neil Young, "Comes a Time" (Silence of the North)
Special Awards	
Golden Reel Award: Heavy Metal; Air Canada Award: Pierre Lamy	
