= Genie Award for Best Performance by a Foreign Actress =

Discontinued annual Canadian media award

The Genie Award for Best Performance by a Foreign Actress was awarded by the Academy of Canadian Cinema and Television from 1980 to 1983, for the best performance by non-Canadian actress in a Canadian film.

The award and its Foreign Actor companion were frequently criticized both by actors and film critics — Canadian actor Christopher Plummer criticized the distinction in his Best Actor acceptance speech at the first Genies ceremony, and Jay Scott called them "loathsome", dubbing them "the Colonial Category", in a 1982 article in The Globe and Mail.

The awards were discontinued after the end of the 4th Genie Awards. Initially, non-Canadian actresses were simply barred from being nominated in acting categories at all, but beginning with the 7th Genie Awards non-Canadian actresses instead became eligible for the Genie Award for Best Performance by an Actress in a Leading Role and/or the Genie Award for Best Performance by an Actress in a Supporting Role.

== Winners and nominees ==
| Year | Nominee | Film |
|---|---|---|
1980; 1st Genie Awards
| 1980; 1st Genie Awards | Trish Van Devere | The Changeling |
| 1980; 1st Genie Awards | Susan Anspach | Running |
| 1980; 1st Genie Awards | Samantha Eggar | The Brood |
| 1980; 1st Genie Awards | Sally Kellerman | It Rained All Night the Day I Left |
| 1980; 1st Genie Awards | Cloris Leachman | Yesterday |
1981; 2nd Genie Awards
| 1981; 2nd Genie Awards | Susan Sarandon | Atlantic City, U.S.A. |
| 1981; 2nd Genie Awards | Ann-Margret | Middle Age Crazy |
| 1981; 2nd Genie Awards | Jamie Lee Curtis | Prom Night |
| 1981; 2nd Genie Awards | Louise Fletcher | The Lucky Star |
| 1981; 2nd Genie Awards | Lee Remick | Tribute |
1982; 3rd Genie Awards
| 1982; 3rd Genie Awards | Annie Potts | Heartaches |
| 1982; 3rd Genie Awards | Ellen Burstyn | Silence of the North |
| 1982; 3rd Genie Awards | Meg Foster | Ticket to Heaven |
| 1982; 3rd Genie Awards | Mariette Hartley | Improper Channels |
| 1982; 3rd Genie Awards | Marthe Keller | The Amateur |
1983; 4th Genie Awards
| 1983; 4th Genie Awards | Glynnis O'Connor | Melanie |
| 1983; 4th Genie Awards | Patty Duke Astin | By Design |
| 1983; 4th Genie Awards | Lee Grant | Visiting Hours |
| 1983; 4th Genie Awards | Marie-France Pisier | The Hot Touch |
| 1983; 4th Genie Awards | Mare Winningham | Threshold |
| 1983; 4th Genie Awards | Charlayne Woodard | Hard Feelings |
