= Genie Award for Best Performance by a Foreign Actor =

Discontinued annual Canadian media award

The Genie Award for Best Performance by a Foreign Actor was awarded by the Academy of Canadian Cinema and Television from 1980 to 1983, for the best performance by non-Canadian actor in a Canadian film.

The award and its Foreign Actress companion were frequently criticized both by actors and film critics — Canadian actor Christopher Plummer criticized the distinction in his Best Actor acceptance speech at the first Genies ceremony, and Jay Scott called them "loathsome", dubbing them "the Colonial Category", in a 1982 article in The Globe and Mail.

The awards were discontinued after the 4th Genie Awards. Initially, non-Canadian actors were simply barred from being nominated in acting categories at all, but beginning with the 7th Genie Awards non-Canadian actors instead became eligible for the Genie Award for Best Performance by an Actor in a Leading Role and/or the Genie Award for Best Performance by an Actor in a Supporting Role.

== Winners and nominees ==
Year	Nominee	Film
1980; 1st Genie Awards
1980; 1st Genie Awards	George C. Scott	The Changeling
1980; 1st Genie Awards	Michael Douglas	Running
1980; 1st Genie Awards	Bill Murray	Meatballs
1980; 1st Genie Awards	Will Sampson	Fish Hawk
1980; 1st Genie Awards	Rod Steiger	Jack London's Klondike Fever
1981; 2nd Genie Awards
1981; 2nd Genie Awards	Jack Lemmon	Tribute
1981; 2nd Genie Awards	Bruce Dern	Middle Age Crazy
1981; 2nd Genie Awards	Burt Lancaster	Atlantic City, U.S.A.
1981; 2nd Genie Awards	Brett Marx	The Lucky Star
1981; 2nd Genie Awards	Rod Steiger	The Lucky Star
1982; 3rd Genie Awards
1982; 3rd Genie Awards	Alan Arkin	Improper Channels
1982; 3rd Genie Awards	Guy Boyd	Ticket to Heaven
1982; 3rd Genie Awards	Robert Carradine	Heartaches
1982; 3rd Genie Awards	Rémi Laurent	The Plouffe Family (Les Plouffe)
1982; 3rd Genie Awards	John Savage	The Amateur
1982; 3rd Genie Awards	Tom Skerritt	Silence of the North
1983; 4th Genie Awards
1983; 4th Genie Awards	Richard Farnsworth	The Grey Fox
1983; 4th Genie Awards	Grand Bush	Hard Feelings
1983; 4th Genie Awards	Bruce Dern	Harry Tracy, Desperado
1983; 4th Genie Awards	Jeff Goldblum	Threshold
1983; 4th Genie Awards	Ron Perlman	Quest for Fire
1983; 4th Genie Awards	Jean Yanne	A Day in a Taxi (Une journée en taxi)
