= The Crime of Ovide Plouffe =

- French: Le Crime d'Ovide Plouffe
- Directed by: Denys Arcand; Gilles Carle
- Written by: Denys Arcand; Roger Lemelin
- Produced by: Justine Héroux; Denis Héroux; John Kemeny; Jacques Bobet; Véronique Jannot; Gabriel Boustiani
- Starring: Gabriel Arcand; Serge Dupire; Donald Pilon
- Cinematography: François Protat
- Edited by: Monique Fortier
- Music by: Olivier Dassault
- Release date: August 27, 1984
- Running time: 107 minutes (film); 6 episodes (TV series)
- Country: Canada
- Language: French

The Crime of Ovide Plouffe (French: Le Crime d'Ovide Plouffe), also known as Murder in the Family in its television run, is a Canadian film and television miniseries from Quebec. The project consisted of two parts: a two-hour theatrical film directed by Denys Arcand, which was released to theatres in 1984, and a six-hour television miniseries, which aired in 1986 and had four hours directed by Gilles Carle leading into the Arcand film as the final two hours.

The series was an adaptation of Roger Lemelin's 1982 novel, Le crime d'Ovide Plouffe, a sequel to his influential 1948 novel Les Plouffe. The original novel had been adapted by Carle as the 1981 film The Plouffe Family, and many of the same actors as in the film reprised their roles in The Crime. The cast included Gabriel Arcand, Anne Létourneau, Donald Pilon, Serge Dupire, Dominique Michel, Rémy Girard, Julien Poulin, and Pierre Curzi.

The theatrical film depicted the criminal trial of Ovide Plouffe after he is falsely accused of murdering his wife, Rita (Létourneau), and the television-only episodes told the story leading up to Rita's death.

The series first aired in French on Télévision de Radio-Canada and then in English on CBC Television in 1986. The French airing retained the film's title Le Crime d'Ovide Plouffe, and the English airing of the series was retitled from The Crime of Ovide Plouffe to Murder in the Family.

== Awards ==
The film garnered six Genie Award nominations at the 6th Genie Awards in 1985:

- Best Actor: Gabriel Arcand
- Best Supporting Actor: Donald Pilon
- Best Art Direction/Production Design: Jocelyn Joly
- Best Cinematography: François Protat
- Best Costume Design: Nicole Pelletier
- Best Editing: Monique Fortier

Gabriel Arcand won the award for Best Actor.
