= 1981 in Canadian television =

This is a list of Canadian television related events from 1981.

== Events ==
Date	Event
January 12	A brand new, publicly funded educational cable television network, called Knowledge Network, is launched in British Columbia.
February 5	NABET employees working at CBC Television go on strike. The strike lasts for months, disrupting programming.
February 5	Juno Awards of 1981.
March 12	2nd Genie Awards.
June 28	Full coverage on the death of Terry Fox airs on all the main television networks.
July 29	The wedding of Prince Charles and Lady Diana Spencer airs live on all the main television networks.

=== Debuts ===
Show	Station	Premiere Date
Canada: The Great Experiment	TVOntario	January 7
Thrill of a Lifetime	CTV	January 7
The Frantics	CBC Television	January 7
Switchback	CBC Television	January 7
Hangin' In	CBC Television	January 7
Leo and Me	CBC Television	May 29
Pitfall	Global	September 14
Seeing Things	CBC Television	September 15

=== Ending this year ===
Show	Station	Cancelled
The Watson Report	CBC Television	May 25
Flappers	CBC Television	November 30
CBC News Magazine	CBC Television	Unknown
Leo and Me	CBC Television	Unknown
Grand Old Country	CTV	Unknown
North America: Growth of a Continent	TVOntario	Unknown

== Television shows ==
=== 1950s ===
- Country Canada (1954–2007)
- The Friendly Giant (1958–1985)
- Hockey Night in Canada (1952–present)
- The National (1954–present)
- Front Page Challenge (1957–1995)
- Wayne and Shuster Show (1958–1989)

=== 1960s ===
- CTV National News (1961–present)
- Land and Sea (1964–present)
- Man Alive (1967–2000)
- Mr. Dressup (1967–1996)
- The Nature of Things (1960–present, scientific documentary series)
- Question Period (1967–present, news program)
- Reach for the Top (1961–1985)
- Take 30 (1962–1983)
- The Tommy Hunter Show (1965–1992)
- University of the Air (1966–1983)
- W-FIVE (1966–present, newsmagazine program)

=== 1970s ===
- The Beachcombers (1972–1990)
- Canada AM (1972–present, news program)
- Celebrity Cooks (1975–1984)
- City Lights (1973–1989)
- Definition (1974–1989)
- the fifth estate (1975–present, newsmagazine program)
- The Great Detective (1979–1982)
- Headline Hunters (1972–1983)
- Let's Go (1976–1984)
- The Littlest Hobo (1979–1985)
- Live It Up! (1978–1990)
- The Mad Dash (1978–1985)
- Marketplace (1972–present, newsmagazine program)
- Polka Dot Door (1971-1993)
- Read All About It! (1979–1983)
- Second City Television (1976–1984)
- Smith & Smith (1979–1985)
- This Land (1970–1982)
- You Can't Do That on Television (1979–1990)
- V.I.P. (1973–1983)
- 100 Huntley Street (1977–present, religious program)

=== 1980s ===
- The Alan Thicke Show (1980–1983)
- Bizarre (1980–1985)
- Home Fires (1980–1983)

== TV movies ==
- A Far Cry from Home
- Cop
- Final Edition
- The Olden Days Coat
- The Plouffe Family (Les Plouffe)
- The Running Man
- Snowbird
- You've Come a Long Way, Katie

== Television stations ==
=== Debuts ===
Date	Market	Station	Channel	Affiliation	Notes/References
October 6	Trois-Rivières, Quebec	CIVC-TV	45	Télé-Québec	
November 3	Rimouski, Quebec	CIVB-TV	22	Télé-Québec	

== Births ==
Date	Name	Notability
May 8	Stephen Amell	Actor
June 21	Nicola Correia-Damude	Actress
July 14	Lucinda Davis	Actress
August 27	Patrick J. Adams	Actor
August 27	Sugar Lyn Beard	Actress (Sailor Moon, The Save-Ums!)
September 1	Michael Adamthwaite	Voice actor

== See also ==
- 1981 in Canada
- List of Canadian films of 1981
