= Great Experiment =

Great Experiment may refer to:

- Canada: The Great Experiment, a Canadian educational television show
- The Great Experiment: Faith and Freedom in America, a book by Karen Lee-Thorp and Os Guinness
- The Great Experiment: The Story of Ancient Empires, Modern States, and the Quest for a Global Nation, a book by Strobe Talbott
- The Great Experiment: George Washington and the American Republic, an exhibit at the Huntington Library 1999–2000
- "The Great Experiment", an episode in Madam Secretary (season 5)

== See also ==
- The Grand Experiment, an album by The Neal Morse Band
