= 1981 Cannes Film Festival =

- Official poster of the 34th Cannes Film Festival, an original illustration by Michel Landi.
- Opening film: Three Brothers
- Closing film: Honeysuckle Rose
- Location: Cannes, France
- Founded: 1946
- Awards: Palme d'Or: Man of Iron
- No. of films: 22 (In Competition)
- Festival date: 13 May 1981 – 27 May 1981
- Website: festival-cannes.com/en

Cannes Film Festival
- 1982 1980

The 34th Cannes Film Festival was held from 13 to 27 May 1981. French filmmaker Jacques Deray served as jury president for the main competition.

Polish filmmaker Andrzej Wajda won the Palme d'Or, the festival's top prize, for the film Man of Iron.

The festival opened with Three Brothers by Francesco Rosi, and closed with Honeysuckle Rose by Jerry Schatzberg.

== Juries ==
- Jacques Deray, French filmmaker - Jury President
- Ellen Burstyn, American actress
- Jean-Claude Carrière, French author
- Robert Chazal, French film critic
- Attilio d'Onofrio, Italian
- Christian Defaye, Swiss journalist
- Carlos Diegues, Brazilian filmmaker
- Antonio Gala, Spanish author
- Andrei Petrov, Soviet composer
- Douglas Slocombe, British cinematographer

== Official selection ==
=== In Competition ===
The following feature films competed for the Palme d'Or:

English title	Original title	Director(s)	Production country
Angels of Iron	Engel aus Eisen	Thomas Brasch	West Germany
Beau Pere	Beau-père	Bertrand Blier	France
Chariots of Fire		Hugh Hudson	United Kingdom, United States
Cserepek		István Gaál	Hungary
Excalibur		John Boorman	United Kingdom, United States
Faktas	Факт	Almantas Grikevičius	Soviet Union
Flame Top	Tulipää	Pirjo Honkasalo and Pekka Lehto	Finland
Heaven's Gate		Michael Cimino	United States
Light Years Away	Les Années lumière	Alain Tanner	France, Switzerland
Looks and Smiles		Ken Loach	United Kingdom
Man of Iron	Człowiek z żelaza	Andrzej Wajda	Poland
Mephisto		István Szabó	Hungary, Austria, West Germany
Montenegro	Montenegro eller Pärlor och svin	Dušan Makavejev	Sweden
National Heritage	Patrimonio nacional	Luis García Berlanga	Spain
Neige		Juliet Berto	France
The Ones and the Others	Les Uns et les Autres	Claude Lelouch	France
Passion of Love	Passione d'amore	Ettore Scola	Italy
Possession		Andrzej Żuławski	France, West Germany
Quartet		James Ivory	France, United Kingdom
The Skin	La pelle	Liliana Cavani	Italy
Thief		Michael Mann	United States
Tragedy of a Ridiculous Man	La tragedia di un uomo ridicolo	Bernardo Bertolucci	Italy

=== Un Certain Regard ===
The following films were selected for the Un Certain Regard section:

English title	Original title	Director(s)	Production country
...And God Created Them	Díos los Cría...	Jacobo Morales	Puerto Rico
Arising from the Surface	सतह से उठता आदमी	Mani Kaul	India
The Big Night Bathe	Голямото нощно къпане	Binka Zhelyazkova	Bulgaria
Cerromaior		Luís Filipe Rocha	Portugal
Eijanaika	ええじゃないか	Shōhei Imamura	Japan
I Love You	Eu Te Amo	Arnaldo Jabor	Brazil
Let There Be Light		John Huston	United States
Memoirs of a Survivor		David Gladwell	United Kingdom
Un moment de bonheur		Yves Laumet	France
Mur Murs		Agnès Varda	France
A Thousand Little Kisses	אלף נשיקות קטנות	Mira Recanati	Israel
The Witness	A tanú	Péter Bacsó	Hungary
Who's Singin' Over There?	Ko to tamo peva	Slobodan Šijan	Yugoslavia
You Love Only Once	Samo jednom se ljubi	Rajko Grlić	Yugoslavia

=== Out of Competition ===
The following films were selected to be screened out of competition:

English title	Original title	Director(s)	Production country
Anima – Symphonie phantastique		Titus Leber	Austria
Blood Wedding	Bodas de sangre	Carlos Saura	Spain
From Mao to Mozart: Isaac Stern in China		Murray Lerner	United States, China
Hands Up!	Ręce do góry	Jerzy Skolimowski	Poland
Havoc in Heaven (1961)	大鬧天宮	Wan Laiming	China
Honeysuckle Rose (closing film)		Jerry Schatzberg	United States
The Fly (short)	A légy	Ferenc Rofusz	Hungary
The Postman Always Rings Twice		Bob Rafelson	United States
Street Angel (1937)	馬路天使	Yuan Muzhi	China
This Is Elvis		Malcolm Leo and Andrew Solt	United States
Three Brothers (opening film)	Tre fratelli	Francesco Rosi	Italy, France
Troubled Laughter	苦惱人的笑	Yang Yanjin and Deng Yimin	China

=== Short Films Competition ===
The following short films competed for the Short Film Palme d'Or:

- Alephah by Gérald Frydman
- André Derain, thèmes et variations by François Porcile
- Dilemma by John Halas
- Diskzokej by Jiří Barta
- Král a skritek by Lubomír Beneš
- Manövergäste by G. Nicolas Hayek
- Maskirani razbojnik by Petar Lalovic
- Moto Perpetuo by Béla Vajda
- Ne me parlez plus jamais d'amour by Sylvain Madigan
- Le Rat by Elisabeth Huppert
- Ravnovesie by Boiko Kanev
- Trcanje by Dusko Sevo
- Zea by André Leduc

== Parallel sections ==
=== International Critics' Week ===
The following feature films were screened for the 20th International Critics' Week (20e Semaine de la Critique):

- She Dances Alone by Robert Dornhelm
- The Moth by Tomasz Zygadlo
- Fil, fond, fosfor by Philippe Nahoun
- Kill Hitler by Villi Hermann, Niklaus Meienberg, Hans Stürm
- Malou by Jeanine Meerapfel
- Fertile Memory by Michel Khleifi
- Le Chapeau malheureux by Maria Sos

=== Directors' Fortnight ===
The following films were screened for the 1981 Directors' Fortnight (Quinzaine des Réalizateurs):

- Albert Pinto Ko Gussa Kyoon Aata Hai by Saeed Akhtar Mirza
- Alligator Shoes by Clay Borris
- Americana by David Carradine
- Act of Violence by Eduardo Escorel
- Beddegama by Lester James Peries
- Bolivar, Sinfonia Tropical by Diego Rísquez
- Bona by Lino Brocka
- Chakra, Vicious Circle by Rabindra Dharmaraj
- Conversa Acabada by João Botelho
- Desperado City by Vadim Glowna
- No Mercy, No Future by Helma Sanders-Brahms
- Francisca by Manoel De Oliveira
- The Vulture by Yaky Yosha
- The Mark of the Beast by Pieter Verhoeff
- In Defense of People by Rafigh Pooya
- Fruits of Passion by Shuji Terayama
- The Plouffe Family by Gilles Carle
- Memorias Do Medo by Alberto Graça
- Narcissus and Psyche by Gábor Bódy
- Seuls by Francis Reusser
- Tell Me A Riddle by Lee Grant
- Wizja lokalna 1901 by Filip Bajon

Short films

- Evolution by Sheila Graber
- Face To Face by Sheila Graber
- Le Miroir Vivant by Eunice Hutchins, Norbert Barnich
- Michelangelo by Sheila Graber
- Music For Film by Jean-Claude Wouters
- Pour Trois Minutes De Gloire by Jean-Claude Bronckart
- T.V.O. by Carlos Castillo
- The Electric Disco Chicken by Bob Goodness
- Tous Les Garcons by Yves Laberge
- Tre Per Eccesso by Giampierro Vinciguerra
- Uno Para Todos, Todos Para Todos by Carlos Castillo

== Official Awards ==
=== In Competition ===
- Palme d'Or: Man of Iron by Andrzej Wajda
- Grand Prix: Light Years Away by Alain Tanner
- Best Screenplay: István Szabó for Mephisto
- Best Actress: Isabelle Adjani for Quartet and Possession
- Best Actor: Ugo Tognazzi for Tragedy of a Ridiculous Man
- Best Supporting Actress: Yelena Solovey for Faktas
- Best Supporting Actor: Ian Holm for Chariots of Fire
- Best Artistic Contribution: Excalibur by John Boorman

=== Caméra d'Or ===
- Desperado City by Vadim Glowna

=== Short Film Palme d'Or ===
- Moto Perpetuo by Béla Vajda
- Jury Prize:
  - Le Rat by Elisabeth Huppert
  - Zea by André Leduc

== Independent Awards ==
=== FIPRESCI Prizes ===
- Malou by Jeanine Meerapfel (International Critics' Week)
- Mephisto by István Szabó (In competition)

=== Commission Supérieure Technique ===
- Technical Grand Prize: Les Uns et les Autres for the sound quality

=== Prize of the Ecumenical Jury ===
- Man of Iron by Andrzej Wajda
  - Special Mention:
    - Chariots of Fire by Hugh Hudson
    - Looks and Smiles by Ken Loach

=== Young Cinema Award ===
- Looks and Smiles by Ken Loach
- Neige by Juliet Berto and Jean-Henri Roger

== Media ==
- INA: The parallel festival, Cannes 1981 (commentary in French)
- INA: Threat of suicide Italian-style for Ugo Tognazzi (in French)
