= On Your Head (film) =

- French: Le Ciel sur la tête
- Directed by: André Melançon; Geneviève Lefebvre
- Written by: Geneviève Lefebvre; Marcel Beaulieu
- Produced by: Yves Fortin; Yves Lafontaine
- Starring: Arianne Maheu; Serge Dupire; Céline Bonnier; Marc Messier
- Cinematography: Thomas Vámos
- Edited by: Yvann Thibaudeau
- Music by: Osvaldo Montes
- Production companies: BE-FILMS; Productions Thalie
- Release date: October 19, 2001
- Running time: 104 minutes
- Country: Canada
- Language: French

On Your Head (French: Le Ciel sur la tête) is a Canadian comedy-drama film, directed by André Melançon and Geneviève Lefebvre and released in 2001. The film stars Arianne Maheu as Simone, a young blind girl living with her single father Marc (Serge Dupire) who is scheming to set him up with a single woman in their town, Céline (Céline Bonnier), so that she can have a new mother.

The cast also includes Marc Messier as Céline's irascible anarchist father Gaby; Daniel Fanego as Diego, an Argentine pilot who is a rival for Céline's affections; David Boutin as Marc's best friend Fred on whom Simone has a schoolgirl crush; and Maka Kotto as Florent, the town's parish priest.

Osvaldo Montes received a Genie Award nomination for Best Original Song at the 22nd Genie Awards, for the song "La niebla del tiempo".
