= Josh Freed =

Canadian writer, director and actor

Josh Freed is a Canadian writer, director and actor.

He has won two Chris Awards for Best North American Current Affairs Documentary. In Canada, Freed has been nominated for three Gemini Awards, three Writers Guild of Canada Awards and a Genie Award.

He writes a weekly humour column in The Gazette. He received two National Newspaper Awards for best Canadian columnist in 1997 and 2002.

== Early life ==
Freed was born and raised in Montreal and grew up on De L’Épée Avenue. Being Jewish, he attended Protestant schools because Catholic schools did not accept Jewish students at the time.

== Bibliography ==
- 1980: Moonwebs: Journey into the Mind of a Cult
- 1983: The Anglo Guide to Survival in Québec
- 1990: Sign Language and Other Tales of Montreal Wildlife
- 1996: Vive le Québec Freed!
- 1997: Fear of Frying...and Other Fax of Life
- 1999: 2000 Reasons to Hate the Millennium
- 2000: Press 1 and Pray...and Other Letters from Voice Jail
- 2023: Bicycle Bob and the bike revolution (about Robert Silverman (cycling activist))

The events described in the 1980 book inspired the award-winning movie Ticket to Heaven and led to the creation of Info-Cult.

== Filmography ==
=== As director ===
- 1991 : North to Nowhere (TV)
- 1993 : Paradise Lost (TV)
- 1994 : Escaping from History
- 1995 : Merchandising Murder
- 1995 : The Last Train
- 2000 : Selling the Water
- 2000 : Polar Bear Safari
- 2002 : Juggling Dreams (TV)
- 2003 : To Kill or to Cure (TV)
- 2004 : In Search of Sleep: an Insomniac’s Journey (TV)
- 2006 : China’s Sexual Revolution (TV)
- 2008 : My Messy Life (TV)
- 2010 : Where Did I Put My Memory? (TV)

=== As a writer ===
- 1988 : A Song for Quebec
- 1992 : Between the Solitudes
- 1997 : Magic Time
- 2000 : Selling the Water
- 2000 : Polar Bear Safari
- 2002 : Juggling Dreams (TV)

=== As an actor ===
- 1981 : Ticket to Heaven
