= Anne Létourneau =

Canadian actress (born 1958)

- Born: August 31, 1958 (age 67)
- Occupations: Film and television actress

Anne Létourneau (born August 31, 1958) is a Canadian film and television actress from Quebec. She is most noted for her performance as Rita Toulouse in the film The Plouffe Family (Les Plouffe), for which she was a Genie Award nominee for Best Supporting Actress at the 3rd Genie Awards in 1982.

She is the daughter of actors Jacques Létourneau and Monique Lepage.
