= Serge Dupire =

Canadian actor (born 1958)

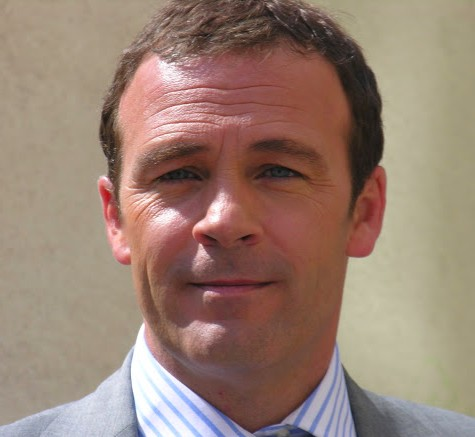
- Born: 23 May 1958 (age 67); Belœil, Quebec, Canada
- Occupation: Actor
- Partner: Rebecca Hampton (2002–2004)

Serge Dupire (born 23 May 1958) is a Canadian actor.

== Selected filmography ==
Film
Year	Title	Role	Notes
1981	The Plouffe Family (Les Plouffe)	Guillaume Plouffe	
1984	A Woman in Transit (La Femme de l'hôtel)	Simon Richler	
1984	The Crime of Ovide Plouffe (Le Crime d'Ovide Plouffe)	Guillaume Plouffe	
1985	The Alley Cat (Le Matou)	Florent Boissonneault	Genie Award nominee for Best Actor
1993	Louis, the Child King (Louis, enfant roi)	Prince de Condé	
1997	The Caretaker's Lodge (La Conciergerie)		
2001	On Your Head (Le Ciel sur la tête)	Marc	
2002	Hit and Run		
2010	The Bait (L'Appât)	Moulin	
2014	Jusqu'au dernier	Rochette	

Television
Year	Title	Role	Notes
1994	Jalna	Renny Whiteoak	8 episodes
2004–2022	Plus belle la vie	Vincent Chaumette	1640 episodes
2024	Beyond Black Beauty	Eckert Dumont	
