= The Alley Cat (1985 film) =

1985 television film directed by Jean Beaudin

- French: Le Matou
- Directed by: Jean Beaudin
- Written by: Yves Beauchemin (novel); Lise Lemay-Rousseau (writer)
- Produced by: Justine Héroux
- Starring: Serge Dupire; Monique Spaziani; Jean Carmet; Julien Guiomar; Guillaume Lemay-Thivierge; Miguel Fernandes; Johanne Fontaine
- Cinematography: Claude Agostini
- Edited by: Jean-Pierre Cereghetti
- Music by: François Dompierre
- Distributed by: Cinévidéo
- Release date: August 28, 1985 (Canada)
- Running time: 141 minutes
- Countries: Canada; France
- Language: French

The Alley Cat (French: Le Matou) is a 1985 Canadian/French French-language drama film based on the novel of the same name by Yves Beauchemin.

== Plot ==
Florent (Dupire) and his wife Elise (Spaziani) always had one dream: to own a restaurant. When they meet a strange old man, Egon Ratablavasky (Carmet), their dream becomes a reality, but only to quickly turn into a nightmare when they sadly discover they have been tricked by him and lose everything.

== Production ==
Restaurant scenes were set in and shot at La Binerie Mont-Royal.

== Recognition ==
- 1986
  - Genie Award for Best Music Score - Won - François Dompierre
  - Genie Award for Best Achievement in Direction - Nominated - Jean Beaudin
  - Genie Award for Best Achievement in Sound Editing - Nominated - Serge Viau, Paul Dion
  - Genie Award for Best Motion Picture - Nominated - Justine Héroux
  - Genie Award for Best Performance by an Actor in a Leading Role - Nominated - Serge Dupire
  - Genie Award for Best Performance by an Actress in a Leading Role - Nominated - Monique Spaziani
  - Genie Award for Best Screenplay - Nominated - Lise Lemay-Rousseau
- 1985
  - Montreal World Film Festival Jury Prize - Won - Jean Beaudin (Tied with On ne meurt que 2 fois)
  - Montreal World Film Festival Most Popular Film - Won - Jean Beaudin
