= Leila Basen =

Canadian film writer

Leila Basen (born 1955) is a Canadian film and television writer and producer, most noted as one of the writers of the 2006 comedy film Bon Cop, Bad Cop.

A graduate of York University, she began her career as a writer for the CBC Television sitcoms King of Kensington and Hangin' In. She later wrote the screenplays for films such as Your Ticket Is No Longer Valid and Killing 'em Softly. balancing her writing career with her family life.

She was predominantly a television writer thereafter, writing scripts for series such as Urban Angel, Max Glick, Street Legal, Road to Avonlea, African Skies, Bob and Margaret, Ready or Not, Riverdale, Emily of New Moon and Blackfly.

After Bon Cop, Bad Cop she returned to television, serving as a writer and producer on Heartland, Strange Empire and Big Top Academy.

== Awards ==
She received a Gemini Award nomination for Best Writing in a Children's or Youth Program or Series at the 9th Gemini Awards in 1995, for the Ready or Not episode "Am I Perverted or What?"

For Bon Cop, Bad Cop, Basen and co-writers Alex Epstein, Patrick Huard and Kevin Tierney received a Jutra Award nomination for Best Screenplay at the 9th Jutra Awards, and won the Canadian Comedy Award for Pretty Funny Film Writing at the 8th Canadian Comedy Awards.
