= The Lucky Star (1980 film) =

- Directed by: Max Fischer
- Written by: Max Fischer; Jack Rosenthal
- Produced by: André Fleury (executive producer); Claude Léger (producer)
- Starring: Brett Marx; Rod Steiger; Louise Fletcher
- Cinematography: Frank Tidy
- Edited by: Yves Langlois
- Music by: Art Phillips
- Production company: Tele-Metropole International
- Distributed by: Manson International
- Release dates: August 22, 1980 (MWFF); May 28, 1982 (U.S.)
- Country: Canada
- Language: English
- Budget: $ 3,700,000 (estimated)

The Lucky Star is a 1980 Canadian drama film.

== Plot ==
A young Jewish boy who escapes from the traumas of the war-torn Netherlands by living in a fantasy world of American westerns.

== Cast ==
- Brett Marx as David Goldberg
- Rod Steiger as Colonel Gluck
- Louise Fletcher as Loes Bakker
- Lou Jacobi as Elia Goldberg
- Yvon Dufour as Burgomeister
- Helen Hughes as Rose Goldberg
- Isabelle Mejias as Marijke
- Jean Gascon as The Priest
- Kalman Steinberg as Salomon
- Pierre Gobeil as Peter

== Recognition ==
- Genie Award for Best Achievement in Sound Editing - Jean-Guy Montpetit - Won
- Genie Award for Best Music Score - Art Phillips - Won
- Genie Award for Best Screenplay Adapted from Another Medium - Max Fischer - Won
- Genie Award for Best Achievement in Overall Sound - Michel Descombes, Patrick Rousseau - Nominated
- Genie Award for Best Motion Picture - André Fleury, Claude Léger - Nominated
- Genie Award for Best Performance by a Foreign Actor - Brett Marx - Nominated
- Genie Award for Best Performance by a Foreign Actor - Rod Steiger - Nominated
- Genie Award for Best Performance by a Foreign Actress - Louise Fletcher - Nominated
