= Justine Héroux =

Canadian film and television producer (1942–2021)

- Born: 1942
- Died: June 25, 2021
- Occupation: Film producer
- Years active: 1970s–1990s
- Spouse: Denis Héroux

Justine Héroux (1942 – June 25, 2021) was a Canadian film and television producer, who was a partner with her husband Denis Héroux in Cité Internationale du Cinéma et de l'Audiovisuel, later known as Ciné-Vidéo. She is most noted as a two-time Genie Award nominee as producer of the Best Picture finalists The Plouffe Family (Les Plouffe) at the 3rd Genie Awards in 1982 and The Alley Cat at the 7th Genie Awards in 1986, and an Emmy Award nominee as producer of the television miniseries Little Gloria... Happy at Last.

Her other credits included the television miniseries The Crime of Ovide Plouffe (Le Crime d'Ovide Plouffe) and Tales of the Wild, and the theatrical feature film In the Shadow of the Wind (Les Fous de Bassan).
