= Troubled Laughter =

1979 film

- DVD cover
- Traditional Chinese: 苦惱人的笑
- Simplified Chinese: 苦恼人的笑
- Hanyu Pinyin: Kǔnǎo Rén de Xiào
- Directed by: Yang Yanjin; Deng Yimin
- Written by: Yang Yanjin; Xue Jing
- Produced by: Xu Songlin
- Starring: Li Zhiyu; Pan Hong; Shi Jiufeng
- Cinematography: Ying Fukang; Zheng Hong
- Edited by: Lan Weijie
- Music by: Xu Jingxin
- Production company: Shanghai Film Studio
- Release date: 1979
- Running time: 92 minutes
- Country: China
- Language: Mandarin

Troubled Laughter is a 1979 Chinese drama film directed by Yang Yanjin and Deng Yimin, set in the Cultural Revolution. The film stars Li Zhiyu as Fu Bin, a powerless newspaper writer who struggles with his conscience during an age of pervasive dishonesty and immorality from the top on down. The ethical and professional conflicts eventually threaten both Fu Bin's work and family relationships, while his mental struggle breaks through to the film’s discursive level. It was screened out of competition at the 1981 Cannes Film Festival.

== Cast ==
- Li Zhiyu as Fu Bin, a writer working for the Haicheng Daily
- Pan Hong as Fu Bin's devoted wife, a schoolteacher
- Gong Fei as Fu Bin's young daughter
- Shi Jiufeng as Fu Bin's colleague and old acquaintance
- Cheng Zhi as Haicheng Daily's chief editor, an ass-kisser
- Yuan Yue as Song Abao, Haicheng's Communist Party secretary, a scheming lowlife
- Bai Mu as disgraced professor of surgery
- Qiao Qi as Fu Bin's former professor in journalism
- Qin Yi as the wife of Fu Bin's former professor, a former actress
- Fu Hengzhi as failing medical student-turned-heartless hospital leader
- Qiu Shisui as a sympathizing doctor
- Hong Zhaosen as secretary
