= Trevor Williams (designer) =

English film & TV designer (1931–2008)

- Born: 3 March 1931; Harrow, London, England
- Died: 14 February 2008 (aged 76); Devon, England
- Occupation: Production designer
- Years active: 1956–2004
- Spouse: Helen Williams (m. 1952)
- Children: 3

Trevor Williams (3 March 1931 – 14 February 2008) was an English film and television production designer, most noted for his work in Canadian and American productions.

Born in Harrow, he moved to Canada in the 1960s and worked on CBC Television productions before moving to Hollywood, where he was a set designer and art director on shows such as Dark Shadows, Little House on the Prairie, Dan Curtis' Dracula and The Night Stalker.

He received two Emmy Award nominations for his work on The Hunchback and The Eccentricities of a Nightingale. In film, he won the Genie Award for Best Art Direction or Production Design at the 1st Genie Awards for his work on The Changeling. He was a nominee in the same category at the 29th Canadian Film Awards in 1978 for The Silent Partner, and at the 3rd Genie Awards in 1982 for The Amateur.
