= How Death Came to Earth =

- Directed by: Ishu Patel
- Cinematography: Simon Leblanc
- Production company: National Film Board of Canada (NFB)
- Release date: 1971
- Running time: 14 minutes
- Country: Canada
- Language: English

How Death Came to Earth is a 14-minute cutout animation film by Ishu Patel produced in 1971 by the National Film Board of Canada. The film deals with an Indian myth of creation, and is notable for its trippy visual style.
