= Garth Drabinsky =

Canadian producer and entrepreneur

- Born: October 27, 1949 (age 77); Toronto, Ontario, Canada
- Occupations: Film and theatrical producer and entrepreneur

Garth Drabinsky (born 1949) is a Canadian film and theatrical producer and entrepreneur. In 2009, he was convicted and sentenced to prison for fraud and forgery. The sentence was reduced from 7 to 5 years in prison, on appeal to the Ontario Court of Appeal, and the Supreme Court of Canada declined to hear a subsequent appeal. In April 2023, a judge dismissed Drabinsky’s defamation lawsuit against American Actor’s Equity for placing him on their ‘Do Not Work’ list, and in July 2024 the 2nd Circuit Court of Appeals affirmed this dismissal, also dismissing Drabinsky's claim that the union's conduct violated antitrust law. Drabinsky has attempted 3 comebacks all resulting in failure and millions of investor dollars being lost.

== Early life ==
Drabinsky contracted polio at age 3 and had multiple operations until he was 12. Born to a Jewish family in Toronto, Ontario, Drabinsky graduated from the University of Toronto with a Bachelor of Laws degree in 1973, and was called to the bar in Ontario in 1975.

Drabinsky wrote a textbook, Motion Pictures and the Arts in Canada: The Business and the Law, while attending law school.

== Film and theatrical career ==
=== Film ===
Entering into the entertainment business in 1978 as an independent commercial film producer (through Tiberius Entertainment Limited, formed with Joel Michaels) and film distributor (through Pan-Canadian Film Distributors Inc., formed with Nat Taylor), Drabinsky produced a series of projects in the 1970s and 1980s. He produced A Broadway Musical, The Disappearance, The Silent Partner, The Changeling, Tribute, The Amateur, Losin' It. However, he stopped producing films due to financial problems at Cineplex.

In April 1979, he and Nat Taylor co-founded Cineplex Theatres, which created a chain of multiplex theatres for the Canadian market. By May 1984, it had acquired the Canadian Odeon Theatre chain, thus becoming Cineplex Odeon and a major player in the industry. It expanded further through the acquisition of several US theatre chains, but he left the company in December 1989.

Other films:

- The Gospel of John (2003)
- Half Light (2004)
- Barrymore (2011)

=== Theatre ===
He leveraged his ownership of the Pantages Theatre in Toronto to form the publicly traded theatre production company, Live Entertainment Corporation of Canada, Inc., also known as Livent. The company expanded, building or refurbishing several theatres, including the Oriental Theatre in Chicago, and entered into management deals with others in Toronto, Vancouver, and New York. It became noted for its productions (which earned a total of 20 Tony Awards out of a total of 71 nominations) of:

- Phantom of the Opera (1989 Canadian production)
- Joseph and the Amazing Technicolor Dreamcoat (1992 Canadian production)
- Kiss of the Spider Woman (1992 Canadian production)*
- Show Boat (1993 Canadian production)**
- Ragtime (1996 original production)
- Sunset Boulevard (1995 Canadian production)
- Fosse (1999 Broadway production)*
- Paradise Square (2022 Broadway production)

- * Tony Award for Best Musical
- ** Tony Award for Best Musical Revival

=== After Livent ===
Beginning in 2002, Drabinsky dabbled for a few years with the Toronto-based film production and direct marketing company, Visual Bible International Inc. (OTCBB: VBII). Although he and Livent co-founder Myron Gottlieb were both purported to be creative consultants to the company, they were instrumental in building VBII's business model and trying to find an American executive to serve as president and CEO to serve as a mouthpiece to Wall Street. They were indeed running the company behind the scenes as fugitives from American prosecutors. One executive who was recruited by the executive search firm Korn Ferry and offered the position, Stuart Hotchkiss, a former Time Inc. executive, declined the job after learning about Drabinsky's and Gottlieb's legal woes and being told by then company chairman and Toronto dentist, Dr. Steven Small, that he would not be able to fire either consultant should the need arise. VBII was put into receivership by an Ontario court in 2005.

Drabinsky remained in the Canadian entertainment industry through Tiberius Entertainment (which later was known as Garth H. Drabinsky Productions). In 2011, it promoted the film Barrymore at the Toronto International Film Festival, based on the play with Christopher Plummer. Drabinsky then partnered with former CBC executive Richard Stursberg to raise funds for two musicals.

In 2022, Drabinsky was the lead producer for the Broadway musical Paradise Square. It began previews at the Ethel Barrymore Theatre in New York City on March 15, 2022, and opened on April 3, 2022 receiving mixed reviews, and earning Drabinsky a Tony Award nomination for Best Musical. On July 11, 2022, it was announced the musical would close on July 17 due to low ticket sales. After several cast members and stage managers spoke out against the working conditions and unpaid benefits, Actors' Equity announced plans to put Drabinsky on the "Do Not Work" list, effectively banning him from producing any future Broadway shows.

== Livent insolvency and subsequent proceedings ==
In November 1998, Livent sought bankruptcy protection in the US and Canada, claiming a debt of $334 million, and securities regulators in both Canada and the US began investigating Livent's books.

=== Canadian proceedings ===
On March 25, 2009, Drabinsky and Livent co-founder Myron Gottlieb were found guilty of fraud and forgery in Ontario Superior Court for misstating the company's financial statements between 1993 and 1998. Drabinsky was sentenced to seven years in jail on August 5, 2009, for his role in the case.

Drabinsky filed an appeal in the Ontario Court of Appeal with respect to his sentence on September 3, 2009. During that appeal, he remained free on bail. On September 13, 2011, the Court of Appeal, while upholding the convictions, reduced Drabinsky's sentence to 5 years. Drabinsky applied for leave to appeal to the Supreme Court of Canada, and the application was dismissed without costs on March 29, 2012. Drabinsky was originally held at Millhaven Institution, for assessment. In December 2011, he was transferred to serve out his sentence at Beaver Creek Institution, a minimum security prison, located in Gravenhurst, Ontario, and was released on day parole in February 2013. Drabinsky was granted full parole on January 20, 2014.

Administrative proceedings were initiated against Livent, Drabinsky and others by the Ontario Securities Commission in 2001, and they were suspended in 2002 until all outstanding criminal proceedings had been completed. In February 2013, the OSC announced that hearings would take place on March 19, 2013, in the matter. Myron Gottlieb and Gordon Eckstein, who were the other parties in the proceedings, subsequently entered into settlement agreements with the OSC in September 2014 and May 2015 respectively.

In 2017, the Ontario Securities Commission permanently banned Drabinsky from becoming a director or officer of any public company in Ontario. The OSC also prohibited him from acting as an investment promoter, and banned him from trading securities (other than as a retail investor, for trades within his RRSP or through a registered dealer for accounts in his name only).

=== US proceedings ===
In January 1999, Livent reached an administrative settlement with the Securities and Exchange Commission, while civil and criminal proceedings were simultaneously pursued against Drabinsky, Gottlieb and certain other former Livent employees.

In 2005, former investors in Livent corporate bonds won a $23.3 million judgment against Drabinsky and Gottlieb in the United States District Court for the Southern District of New York, for which enforcement of the judgment was upheld by the Ontario Court of Appeal in 2008.

On June 25, 2019, legal authorities in New York dismissed all outstanding criminal charges against Drabinsky (almost 20 years after accusing him of fraud involving Livent Inc.) with prejudice. Assistant United States attorney, Sarah Eddy, said the dismissal is appropriate because Mr. Drabinsky had already been prosecuted in Canada for the fraud. While the outstanding charges had been dormant for many years, they impeded Mr. Drabinsky from being able to travel to the United States, for fear of extradition. Drabinsky is now free to travel to-and-from the United States, and has been doing so frequently while working on his new musical, Paradise Square (formerly titled, Hard Times).

=== Disbarment ===
On July 17, 2014, Drabinsky was disbarred by the Tribunal of the Law Society of Upper Canada for unbecoming conduct, having been found guilty of defrauding the public and forging certain financial statements. The Tribunal's order, effective immediately, revoked his licence to practice law in the province of Ontario.

=== Order of Canada ===
On November 29, 2012, the Governor General of Canada David Johnston signed an Ordinance of Termination revoking Drabinsky's membership in the Order of Canada, originally conferred in 1995 in the Officer grade. Drabinsky subsequently filed an application in the Federal Court of Canada to block his removal, which was dismissed on January 9, 2014. He subsequently appealed the decision to the Federal Court of Appeal. The appeal was heard in December 2014, and rejected the following month, when the court held that there was "no basis" for it to intervene in the matter.

== Bibliography and documentary ==
Books

- Garth Drabinsky (1976). Motion Pictures and the Arts in Canada: the business and the law. Toronto: McGraw-Hill Ryerson. ISBN 0-07082298-0.
- Garth Drabinsky (1992). Closer to the Sun (An Autobiography). with Marq de Villiers. Toronto: McClelland & Stewart. ISBN 0-77105650-8.

Documentary

- Show Stopper: The Theatrical Life of Garth Drabinsky at IMDb: premiered at the Toronto International Film Festival in 2012, directed by Barry Avrich

== Works cited ==
- Knelman, Martin (1987). Home Movies: Tales from the Canadian Film World. Key Porter Books. ISBN 1550130498.
