= The Amateur (2025 film) =

2025 American film by James Hawes

- Theatrical release poster
- Directed by: James Hawes
- Screenplay by: Ken Nolan; Gary Spinelli
- Based on: The Amateur by Robert Littell
- Produced by: Hutch Parker; Dan Wilson; Rami Malek; Joel B. Michaels
- Starring: Rami Malek; Rachel Brosnahan; Caitríona Balfe; Michael Stuhlbarg; Laurence Fishburne
- Cinematography: Martin Ruhe
- Edited by: Jonathan Amos
- Music by: Volker Bertelmann
- Production company: Hutch Parker Entertainment
- Distributed by: 20th Century Studios
- Release date: April 11, 2025
- Running time: 123 minutes
- Country: United States
- Language: English
- Budget: $60 million
- Box office: $96 million

For the 1981 version of the film, please see the article The Amateur (1981 film).

The Amateur is a 2025 American spy action thriller film directed by James Hawes and written by Ken Nolan and Gary Spinelli. It is based on the 1981 novel by Robert Littell, which was previously adapted into a 1981 Canadian film. It stars Rami Malek (who also produced), Rachel Brosnahan, Caitríona Balfe, Michael Stuhlbarg, Holt McCallany, Julianne Nicholson, and Laurence Fishburne. In the film, when a CIA cryptographer's wife is killed in a terrorist attack, he blackmails the agency into training him so he can personally seek revenge.

The film was released in the United States by 20th Century Studios on April 11, 2025. It received mixed reviews from critics.

== Plot ==
CIA cryptographer Charlie Heller is restoring an old Cessna as a present from his wife, Sarah, who leaves for a business trip in London. Charlie has befriended a field agent, Jackson O'Brien, code name "The Bear", and an anonymous source, code name "Inquiline". Classified files from Inquiline reveal Special Activities Center Director and Charlie's boss, Alex Moore, disguised politically motivated drone strikes as suicide bombings.

Charlie is subsequently brought to CIA Director Samantha O'Brien, who informs him that Sarah has been killed in a terrorist attack. After an arms deal gone wrong, four people took Sarah and others hostage, killing her before escaping.

A grieving Charlie identifies the four—Belarusian criminal Mishka Blazhic, South African ex-special forces operative Lawrence Ellish, former Armenian intelligence officer Gretchen Frank, and elusive mastermind Horst Schiller, Sarah's killer—but Moore and his deputy, Caleb Horowitz, insist they are working to take down Schiller's entire network. Determined to avenge Sarah, Charlie confronts Moore with his incriminating orders that caused hundreds of civilian and allied casualties. Threatening to leak the information, Charlie demands resources and training at "The Farm" to personally hunt down the four assailants.

Sent to train with Colonel Robert Henderson at Camp Peary, the gun-shy Charlie excels at bomb-making, but Henderson declares he is simply not capable of killing. Searching Charlie's home and office, Moore and Caleb discover a CD he hid in a bar's jukebox, but realize he was bluffing. Henderson is ordered to eliminate Charlie, who bugged the files he left in Moore's office and has already left the country.

Charlie breaks into Gretchen's apartment in Paris and discovers Gretchen's appointment at an allergy clinic. He takes a gun, but cannot bring himself to shoot her. Instead, he traps Gretchen in a hypobaric chamber that he fills with pollen. Charlie demands Schiller's location, but cannot hear her answer the question as she struggles to breathe and he releases her so that she can answer the question. Gretchen then overtakes Charlie with her fighting skills and escapes, but is fatally struck by a van.

Taking Gretchen's phone, Charlie flees to Marseille, where Henderson corners him in a bar, but he sets off an explosion and escapes. He requests Inquiline's help and is smuggled to Istanbul, where Inquiline reveals herself as Davies, the Russian widow of a murdered ex-KGB officer, having taken his place as Charlie's source. They trace Blazhic to a luxury hotel in Madrid. Meanwhile, O'Brien learns Moore has sent Henderson after Charlie and dispatches her own operative to protect Charlie.

In Madrid, Charlie confronts Blazhic as he swims in the hotel's suspended swimming pool high above the ground. When Blazhic refuses to cooperate, Charlie presses a remote control that triggers an explosive device that shatters the glass pool and sends him plummeting to his death. He is nearly apprehended by Henderson, who is attacked by O'Brien's operative; Henderson is shot but kills the operative, and Charlie escapes. Caleb realizes that Charlie is communicating with someone and tracks down Davies. He contacts the Russian station chief in Istanbul. A Russian FSB strike team is sent, and Davies is killed as she flees with Charlie.

Charlie tracks Ellish down in Romania under the guise of selling him missiles and traps him with an improvised explosive, forcing him to reveal that Schiller operates from a ship on the Baltic Sea. He takes Ellish's phone and leaves him to die in the explosion. Charlie arrives in Primorsk to spy on Schiller's operation. The Bear, worried for Charlie's safety, confronts him personally to try to talk him out of his mission, but Charlie refuses to end his vendetta.

Charlie is captured and brought aboard Schiller's ship, coming face-to-face with Sarah's killer. Schiller offers him a loaded gun and the chance to take his revenge. Instead, Charlie reveals he has hacked the ship, steering it to the Gulf of Finland where Schiller is taken into custody by Finnish police and Interpol, as he wanted Schiller to feel as scared and powerless as Sarah felt in her final moments. Moore and Caleb are arrested for their unsanctioned operations, and O'Brien announces that the agency has purged its bad apples. After being visited by a recovered Henderson, Charlie finishes his plane's restoration and takes it for a flight.

== Cast ==
- Rami Malek as Charles "Charlie" Heller, a CIA cryptographer and vigilante
- Laurence Fishburne as Robert "Hendo" Henderson, Charlie's handler
- Rachel Brosnahan as Sarah Heller, Charlie's wife
- Caitríona Balfe as Inquiline / Davies, Charlie's anonymous contact
- Michael Stuhlbarg as Horst Schiller, the criminal responsible for killing Charlie's wife
- Holt McCallany as CIA Special Activities Center (SAC) Director Alex Moore, Charlie's boss
- Julianne Nicholson as CIA Director Samantha O'Brien
- Danny Sapani as Caleb Horowitz, a CIA supervisor
- Jon Bernthal as Jackson O'Brien, a.k.a. The Bear, a CIA operative
- Adrian Martinez as Carlos, Charlie's co-worker
- Marc Rissmann as Mishka Blazhic, one of Schiller's accomplices
- Joseph Millson as Ellish, one of Schiller's accomplices
- Barbara Probst as Gretchen Frank, one of Schiller's accomplices
- Alice Hewkin as Ali Park
- Henry Garrett as the Chief of Staff

Additionally, Marthe Keller, one of the stars of the 1981 film, has a cameo appearance as a florist in Paris.

== Production ==
Development on a new adaptation of the Robert Littell novel was first announced in November 2006, with Hugh Jackman attached to star, and Evan Katz writing the screenplay. In February 2023, Hutch Parker and Dan Wilson were announced to be producing the project for 20th Century Studios with James Hawes attached as director and Rami Malek in the lead role. Malek was also listed as an executive producer on the project. In May, Rachel Brosnahan, Caitriona Balfe, Adrian Martinez, Laurence Fishburne, Holt McCallany, and Julianne Nicholson were added to the cast.

Principal photography began in London in June 2023. Filming locations were scheduled for around the south-east of England, as well as France and Turkey. Production also took place at Pinewood Studios. Filming was suspended in July due to the 2023 SAG-AFTRA strike. Filming resumed by December 2023. It was later confirmed that Takehiro Hira was also cast, but his role was cut from the final film. In October 2024, it was determined by the Writers Guild of America that Ken Nolan and Gary Spinelli would receive screenplay credit, while Katz, Scott Z. Burns, Stephen Chin, Scott Frank, Hawes, Littell, Diana Maddox, and Patrick Ness contributed additional literary material.

== Release ==
The Amateur was released on April 11, 2025, after previously being scheduled for November 8, 2024.

=== Home media ===
The Amateur was released on digital media on June 10, 2025, followed by Ultra HD Blu-ray, Blu-ray and DVD on July 8, 2025, by 20th Century Studios Home Entertainment. The film subsequently became available for streaming on Hulu and Disney+ on July 17, 2025.

In the United Kingdom, The Amateur debuted at No. 4 on the Official Film Chart for the week ending June 17 and remained within the top ten through the week ending July 30. In the United States, following its premium digital release on June 10, the film ranked No. 2 on Fandango at Home's weekly digital sales and rental chart for the week ending June 15. It ranked No. 3 the following week, ending June 22, and placed No. 6 the week after. On physical media, The Amateur ranked as the ninth best-selling title on Circana's VideoScan chart, which tracks DVD and Blu-ray sales, for July 2025.

Nielsen Media Research, which records streaming viewership on certain U.S. television screens, reported that The Amateur generated 310 million minutes of watch time between July 14–20, ranking as the most-streamed film that week. The following week, from July 21–27, the film accumulated 201 million minutes of watch time, placing eighth.

== Reception ==
=== Box office ===
The Amateur has grossed $40.8 million in the United States and Canada, and $55.2 million in other territories, for a worldwide total of $96 million.

In the United States and Canada, The Amateur was released alongside Drop, Warfare, and The King of Kings, and was projected to gross $12–14 million from 3,300 theaters in its opening weekend. The film made $5.99 million on its first day, including $2 million from preview screenings throughout the week. It went on to debut to $14.8 million, finishing third at the box office behind A Minecraft Movie and The King of Kings. In its second weekend the film made $6 million (a drop of 53%), finishing in fourth.

=== Critical response ===
On the review aggregator website Rotten Tomatoes, 61% of 196 critics' reviews are positive, with an average rating of 5.9/10. The website's consensus reads: "Rami Malek is a compellingly unconventional action hero in the otherwise formulaic The Amateur, which dispenses justice with solid execution but a curious lack of emotional stakes." Metacritic, which uses a weighted average, assigned the film a score of 52 out of 100, based on 37 critics, indicating "mixed or average" reviews. Audiences polled by CinemaScore gave the film an average grade of "B+" on an A+ to F scale, while those surveyed by PostTrak gave it a 77% overall positive score, with 57% saying they would definitely recommend the film.

IndieWire's David Ehrlich called the film "an aggressively competent spy thriller". Owen Gleiberman of Variety wrote, "The movie isn't badly made (it's never less than watchable), but a lot of pulp has been stuffed into its blender". Wendy Ide of The Guardian gave it 3/5 stars, saying it had "a promising pulpy premise but Malek feels too wan and underpowered in the charisma department to be carrying an action flick." Rolling Stone's A. A. Dowd called it "the kind of disposable airport spy thriller that Hollywood rarely makes anymore and which generally plays fine, maybe best, on cable over a lazy Saturday afternoon."

RogerEbert.com's Brian Tallerico gave the film 1.5/4 stars. He wrote, "The foundational problem with a film like this is that the lack of personality forces the viewer to consider the plot, which is a load of utter nonsense. Suspension of disbelief is so much easier when a film gives you something else to hold onto, which is just not the case here, leaving viewers stuck with shallow characters and ludicrous plotting". Kevin Maher of The Times gave it 2/5 stars, writing, "It would be funny if it weren't so dull and so strangely played by Malek, an actor who seemingly believes that a complex internal life is best illustrated by hyperactive facial muscles and the blinkless stare of a sullen zombie."
