= Max Fischer (screenwriter) =

Canadian screenwriter and film director

- Born: Canada
- Occupations: Screenwriter, film director

Max Fischer is a Canadian screenwriter and film director known for such films as The Lucky Star, Killing 'em Softly, Wet Dreams and Deception.
