= Killing 'em Softly =

- Directed by: Max Fischer
- Written by: Leila Basen; Max Fischer
- Based on: The Neighbor (novel) by Laird Koenig
- Produced by: Claude Léger
- Starring: George Segal; Irene Cara; Joyce Gordon; Andrew Martin Thompson; Barbara Cook; Clark Johnson; Nicholas Campbell
- Cinematography: François Protat
- Edited by: Jean-Guy Montpetit; Fabien D. Tordjmann
- Music by: Art Phillips
- Distributed by: Interglobal Home Video
- Release date: 1982
- Country: Canada
- Language: English

Killing 'em Softly is a 1982 Canadian thriller film directed by Max Fischer, starring Irene Cara, George Segal, Clark Johnson and Nicholas Campbell. It is most noted for production problems which led to it becoming one of the first Canadian films ever to be released direct to video, and led to a court case over production funding which was not resolved until 1995.

Based on Laird Koenig's novel The Neighbor, the film's plot centres on the girlfriend of a murdered man, who falls in love with her boyfriend's killer.

Irene Cara also performs the opening theme song "City Nights".

== Cast ==
- George Segal as Jimmy Skinner
- Irene Cara as Jane Flores
- Joyce Gordon as Poppy Mellinger
- Andrew Thomson as Lou Eberhard (credited as Andrew Martin Thompson)
- Clark Johnson as Michael
- Barbara Cook as Susan
- Nicholas Campbell as Clifford
- Gail Dahms-Bonine as "Cookie" (credited as Gail Dahms)
- Emidio Michetti as Carlos
- George E. Zeeman as Arnold
- Arleigh Peterson as Harold
- Sheena Larkin as Ms. Adamson, Lawyer
- Jeffrey Cohen as Collector
- Irene Kessler as Darlene
- Charlotte Jones as Mrs. Zbanski
- Antonia Ray as Fortune Teller
- Daniel Whitner as Altman
- Claudette Roche as Waitress (uncredited)

== Production ==
The film was originally announced with the working title Neighbor, and was originally slated to star Peter O'Toole in the role that Segal ultimately played. Due to cost overruns, however, producer Claude Léger approached Télé-Métropole and the Dutch firm Mueller International as guarantors for a $3.15 million loan from the Mercantile Bank of Canada. When a dispute emerged over story rights, Mercantile Bank called in the loan, bankrupting Léger. Mercantile Bank then sued Télé-Métropole and Mueller International to recover its costs, and gave the film a minimal theatrical run under the title The Man in 5A, before selling it to Palan Entertainment for $480,000.

In 1989, the Quebec Superior Court ordered Télé-Métropole to pay $4.6 million to the National Bank of Canada, which had by this time acquired the Mercantile Bank. Télé-Métropole appealed the decision to the Quebec Court of Appeal, which upheld the decision in 1995; with compound interest, however, Télé-Métropole was now ordered to pay $8 million.

Screenwriter Leila Basen acknowledged in good humor that she had written what was widely considered "the worst Canadian movie ever made". According to Basen, however, "at least the script for The Man in 5A was good. The problem was that the producers ran out of money. I paid to see the movie at a theatre - and asked for my money back at the end."

== Awards ==
Campbell received a Genie Award nomination for Best Supporting Actor at the 4th Genie Awards in 1983. Writing for Cinema Canada, critic J. Paul Costabile stated that the nomination had been given "for no discernible reason".
