= Canadian Screen Award for Best Supporting Actress =

Discontinued annual Canadian media award

The Academy of Canadian Cinema and Television presents an annual award for Best Performance by an Actress in a Supporting Role to the best performance by a supporting actress in a Canadian film. The award was first presented in 1970 by the Canadian Film Awards, and was presented annually until 1978 with the exception of 1974 due to the cancellation of the awards that year.

From 1980 until 2012, the award was presented as part of the Genie Awards ceremony; since 2013, it has been presented as part of the new Canadian Screen Awards.

In August 2022, the Academy announced that it will discontinue its past practice of presenting gendered awards for film and television actors and actresses; beginning with the 11th Canadian Screen Awards in 2023, gender-neutral awards for Best Performance will be presented, with eight nominees per category instead of five. Supporting performances are now honoured with the Canadian Screen Award for Best Supporting Performance in a Film.

== 1970s ==
Year	Nominee	Film	Ref
1970; 22nd Canadian Film Awards
1970; 22nd Canadian Film Awards	Fernande Giroux	Red	
1971; 23rd Canadian Film Awards
1971; 23rd Canadian Film Awards	Olivette Thibault	Mon oncle Antoine	
1972; 24th Canadian Film Awards
1972; 24th Canadian Film Awards	Doris Petrie	Wedding in White	
1973; 25th Canadian Film Awards
1973; 25th Canadian Film Awards	Camille Bernard	Kamouraska	
1974
1974	No award presented		
1975; 26th Canadian Film Awards
1975; 26th Canadian Film Awards	Lila Kedrova	Eliza's Horoscope	
1976; 27th Canadian Film Awards
1976; 27th Canadian Film Awards	Tedde Moore	Second Wind	
1977; 28th Canadian Film Awards
1977; 28th Canadian Film Awards	Carole Lazare	One Man	
1978; 29th Canadian Film Awards
1978; 29th Canadian Film Awards	Marilyn Lightstone	In Praise of Older Women	
1978; 29th Canadian Film Awards	Lynne Cavanagh	Three Card Monte	
1978; 29th Canadian Film Awards	Monique Mercure	The Third Walker	
1978; 29th Canadian Film Awards	Alberta Watson	In Praise of Older Women	

== 1980s ==
Year	Nominee	Film	Ref
1980; 1st Genie Awards
1980; 1st Genie Awards	Geneviève Bujold	Murder by Decree	
1980; 1st Genie Awards	Helen Burns	The Changeling	
1980; 1st Genie Awards	Patricia Collins	Summer's Children	
1980; 1st Genie Awards	Barbara Gordon	Wild Horse Hank	
1980; 1st Genie Awards	Frances Hyland	The Changeling	
1981; 2nd Genie Awards
1981; 2nd Genie Awards	Kate Reid	Atlantic City	
1981; 2nd Genie Awards	Colleen Dewhurst	Tribute	
1981; 2nd Genie Awards	Gale Garnett	Tribute	
1981; 2nd Genie Awards	Frances Hyland	The Hounds of Notre Dame	
1981; 2nd Genie Awards	Micheline Lanctôt	The Coffin Affair (L'Affaire Coffin)	
1982; 3rd Genie Awards
1982; 3rd Genie Awards	Denise Filiatrault	The Plouffe Family (Les Plouffe)	
1982; 3rd Genie Awards	Juliette Huot	The Plouffe Family (Les Plouffe)	
1982; 3rd Genie Awards	Chapelle Jaffe	The Amateur	
1982; 3rd Genie Awards	Anne Létourneau	The Plouffe Family (Les Plouffe)	
1982; 3rd Genie Awards	Dixie Seatle	Ticket to Heaven	
1983; 4th Genie Awards
1983; 4th Genie Awards	Jackie Burroughs	The Grey Fox	
1983; 4th Genie Awards	Geneviève Brassard	Sweet Lies and Loving Oaths (Doux aveux)	
1983; 4th Genie Awards	Clare Coulter	By Design	
1983; 4th Genie Awards	Patricia Nolin	Beyond Forty (La Quarantaine)	
1983; 4th Genie Awards	Trudy Young	Melanie	
1984; 5th Genie Awards
1984; 5th Genie Awards	Jackie Burroughs	The Wars	
1984; 5th Genie Awards	Amulette Garneau	Maria Chapdelaine	
1984; 5th Genie Awards	Elva Mai Hoover	The Terry Fox Story	
1984; 5th Genie Awards	Tedde Moore	A Christmas Story	
1984; 5th Genie Awards	Linda Sorgini	The Tin Flute (Bonheur d'occasion)	
1985; 6th Genie Awards
1985; 6th Genie Awards	Linda Sorenson	Draw!	
1985; 6th Genie Awards	Jackie Burroughs	The Surrogate	
1985; 6th Genie Awards	Barbara Law	Bedroom Eyes	
1985; 6th Genie Awards	Elizabeth Leigh-Milne	Walls	
1985; 6th Genie Awards	Jane McKinnon	The Bay Boy	
1985; 6th Genie Awards	Leah Pinsent	The Bay Boy	
1986; 7th Genie Awards
1986; 7th Genie Awards	Linda Sorenson	Joshua Then and Now	
1986; 7th Genie Awards	Lally Cadeau	Separate Vacations	
1986; 7th Genie Awards	Barbara Gordon	Overnight	
1986; 7th Genie Awards	Fernanda Tavares	90 Days	
1987; 8th Genie Awards
1987; 8th Genie Awards	Louise Portal	The Decline of the American Empire (Le Déclin de l'empire américain)	
1987; 8th Genie Awards	Lucie Laurier	Anne Trister	
1987; 8th Genie Awards	Andrée Pelletier	Bach and Broccoli (Bach et Bottine)	
1987; 8th Genie Awards	Geneviève Rioux	The Decline of the American Empire (Le Déclin de l'empire américain)	
1987; 8th Genie Awards	Marie Tifo	In the Shadow of the Wind (Les Fous de Bassan)	
1988; 9th Genie Awards
1988; 9th Genie Awards	Paule Baillargeon	I've Heard the Mermaids Singing	
1988; 9th Genie Awards	Jayne Eastwood	Night Friend	
1988; 9th Genie Awards	Fran Gebhard	Blue City Slammers	
1988; 9th Genie Awards	Ann-Marie MacDonald	I've Heard the Mermaids Singing	
1988; 9th Genie Awards	Maruska Stankova	Dreams Beyond Memory	
1989; 10th Genie Awards
1989; 10th Genie Awards	Colleen Dewhurst	Obsessed	
1989; 10th Genie Awards	Janet-Laine Green	Cowboys Don't Cry	
1989; 10th Genie Awards	Helen Hughes	Martha, Ruth and Edie	
1989; 10th Genie Awards	Miou-Miou	The Revolving Doors (Les Portes tournantes)	
1989; 10th Genie Awards	Susan Douglas Rubeš	The Outside Chance of Maximilian Glick	

== 1990s ==
Year	Nominee	Film	Ref
1990; 11th Genie Awards
1990; 11th Genie Awards	Robyn Stevan	Bye Bye Blues	
1990; 11th Genie Awards	Pauline Martin	Jesus of Montreal (Jésus de Montréal)	
1990; 11th Genie Awards	Johanne-Marie Tremblay	Jesus of Montreal (Jésus de Montréal)	
1991; 12th Genie Awards
1991; 12th Genie Awards	Danielle Proulx	Love Crazy (Amoureux fou)	
1991; 12th Genie Awards	Winifred Holden	The Company of Strangers	
1991; 12th Genie Awards	Sandrine Holt	Black Robe	
1991; 12th Genie Awards	Ofelia Medina	Diplomatic Immunity	
1991; 12th Genie Awards	Catherine Roche	The Company of Strangers	
1992; 13th Genie Awards
1992; 13th Genie Awards	Monique Mercure	Naked Lunch	
1992; 13th Genie Awards	Krista Bridges	The Shower	
1992; 13th Genie Awards	Judy Davis	On My Own	
1992; 13th Genie Awards	Tracey Moore	Defy Gravity	
1992; 13th Genie Awards	Johanne Marie Tremblay	The Saracen Woman (La Sarrasine)	
1993; 14th Genie Awards
1993; 14th Genie Awards	Nicola Cavendish	The Grocer's Wife	
1993; 14th Genie Awards	Brigitte Bako	I Love a Man in Uniform	
1993; 14th Genie Awards	Céline Bonnier	Tectonic Plates	
1993; 14th Genie Awards	Sylvie Drapeau	The Sex of the Stars (Le Sexe des étoiles)	
1993; 14th Genie Awards	Charlene Fernetz	Harmony Cats	
1993; 14th Genie Awards	Kate Hennig	Thirty Two Short Films About Glenn Gould	
1994; 15th Genie Awards
1994; 15th Genie Awards	Martha Henry	Mustard Bath	
1994; 15th Genie Awards	Wanda Cannon	For the Moment	
1994; 15th Genie Awards	Mia Kirshner	Love and Human Remains	
1994; 15th Genie Awards	Johanne McKay	My Friend Max (Mon amie Max)	
1994; 15th Genie Awards	Joanne Vannicola	Love and Human Remains	
1995; 16th Genie Awards
1995; 16th Genie Awards	Kate Nelligan	Margaret's Museum	
1995; 16th Genie Awards	Anne-Marie Cadieux	The Confessional (Le Confessionnal)	
1995; 16th Genie Awards	Rachael Crawford	Rude	
1995; 16th Genie Awards	Marie Gignac	The Confessional (Le Confessionnal)	
1995; 16th Genie Awards	Pascale Montpetit	Eclipse	
1996; 17th Genie Awards
1996; 17th Genie Awards	Martha Burns	Long Day's Journey into Night	
1996; 17th Genie Awards	Marie-Andrée Corneille	Mistaken Identity (Erreur sur la personne)	
1996; 17th Genie Awards	Josée Deschênes	Polygraph (Le Polygraphe)	
1996; 17th Genie Awards	Maria de Medeiros	Polygraph (Le Polygraphe)	
1996; 17th Genie Awards	Manon Miclette	Love Me, Love Me Not (J'aime, j'aime pas)	
1997; 18th Genie Awards
1997; 18th Genie Awards	Seana McKenna	The Hanging Garden	
1997; 18th Genie Awards	France Castel	Karmina	
1997; 18th Genie Awards	France Castel	The Countess of Baton Rouge (La Comtesse de Bâton Rouge)	
1997; 18th Genie Awards	Kerry Fox	The Hanging Garden	
1997; 18th Genie Awards	Joan Orenstein	The Hanging Garden	
1998; 19th Genie Awards
1998; 19th Genie Awards	Monique Mercure	Conquest	
1998; 19th Genie Awards	Geneviève Bujold	Last Night	
1998; 19th Genie Awards	Rachael Crawford	Pale Saints	
1998; 19th Genie Awards	Anna Henry	The Fishing Trip	
1998; 19th Genie Awards	Roberta Maxwell	Last Night	
1999; 20th Genie Awards
1999; 20th Genie Awards	Catherine O'Hara	The Life Before This	
1999; 20th Genie Awards	Suzanne Champagne	Winter Stories (Histoires d'hiver)	
1999; 20th Genie Awards	Deborah Kara Unger	Sunshine	
1999; 20th Genie Awards	Rachel Weisz	Sunshine	
1999; 20th Genie Awards	Kathryn Zenna	Jack and Jill	

== 2000s ==
Year	Nominee	Film	Ref
2000; 21st Genie Awards
2000; 21st Genie Awards	Helen Shaver	We All Fall Down	
2000; 21st Genie Awards	Annick Bergeron	Pandora's Beauty (La Beauté de Pandore)	
2000; 21st Genie Awards	Céline Bonnier	The Orphan Muses (Les Muses orphelines)	
2000; 21st Genie Awards	Stacy Smith	New Waterford Girl	
2000; 21st Genie Awards	Mary Walsh	New Waterford Girl	
2000; 21st Genie Awards	Barbara Williams	Love Come Down	
2001; 22nd Genie Awards
2001; 22nd Genie Awards	Molly Parker	Last Wedding	
2001; 22nd Genie Awards	Marya Delver	Last Wedding	
2001; 22nd Genie Awards	Mimi Kuzyk	Lost and Delirious	
2001; 22nd Genie Awards	Brenda Fricker	The War Bride	
2001; 22nd Genie Awards	Molly Parker	The War Bride	
2002; 23rd Genie Awards
2002; 23rd Genie Awards	Pascale Montpetit	Savage Messiah	
2002; 23rd Genie Awards	Brigitte Bako	Saint Monica	
2002; 23rd Genie Awards	Moushmi Chatterji	Bollywood/Hollywood	
2002; 23rd Genie Awards	Rachel McAdams	Perfect Pie	
2002; 23rd Genie Awards	Dina Pathak	Bollywood/Hollywood	
2003; 24th Genie Awards
2003; 24th Genie Awards	Marie-Josée Croze	The Barbarian Invasions (Les Invasions barbares)	
2003; 24th Genie Awards	Olympia Dukakis	The Event	
2003; 24th Genie Awards	Emily Hampshire	A Problem with Fear	
2003; 24th Genie Awards	Meredith McGeachie	Punch	
2003; 24th Genie Awards	Annabella Piugattuk	The Snow Walker	
2004; 25th Genie Awards
2004; 25th Genie Awards	Jennifer Jason Leigh	Childstar	
2004; 25th Genie Awards	Juliette Gosselin	Battle of the Brave (Nouvelle-France)	
2004; 25th Genie Awards	Sylvie Moreau	Love and Magnets (Les Aimants)	
2004; 25th Genie Awards	Elliot Page (Note: As Ellen Page; the awards show took place before Page came out as transgender.)	Wilby Wonderful	
2004; 25th Genie Awards	Susana Salazar	A Silent Love	
2005; 26th Genie Awards
2005; 26th Genie Awards	Danielle Proulx	C.R.A.Z.Y.	
2005; 26th Genie Awards	Babz Chula	Seven Times Lucky	
2005; 26th Genie Awards	Suzanne Clément	Audition (L'Audition)	
2005; 26th Genie Awards	Marianne Fortier	Aurore	
2005; 26th Genie Awards	Micheline Lanctôt	Familia	
2006; 27th Genie Awards
2006; 27th Genie Awards	Carrie-Anne Moss	Snow Cake	
2006; 27th Genie Awards	Caroline Dhavernas	Niagara Motel	
2006; 27th Genie Awards	Marie Gignac	The Secret Life of Happy People (La Vie secrète des gens heureux)	
2006; 27th Genie Awards	Emily Hampshire	Snow Cake	
2006; 27th Genie Awards	Vivian Wu	Eve and the Fire Horse	
2007; 28th Genie Awards
2007; 28th Genie Awards	Kristen Thomson	Away from Her	
2007; 28th Genie Awards	Marie-Ginette Guay	Continental, a Film Without Guns (Continental, un film sans fusil)	
2007; 28th Genie Awards	Laurence Leboeuf	My Daughter, My Angel (Ma fille mon ange)	
2007; 28th Genie Awards	Véronique Le Flaguais	Surviving My Mother (Comment survivre à sa mère)	
2007; 28th Genie Awards	Fanny Mallette	Continental, a Film Without Guns (Continental, un film sans fusil)	
2008; 29th Genie Awards
2008; 29th Genie Awards	Kristin Booth	Young People Fucking	
2008; 29th Genie Awards	Céline Bonnier	Mommy Is at the Hairdresser's (Maman est chez le coiffeur)	
2008; 29th Genie Awards	Éveline Gélinas	The Necessities of Life (Ce qu'il faut pour vivre)	
2008; 29th Genie Awards	Anie Pascale	Everything Is Fine (Tout est parfait)	
2008; 29th Genie Awards	Rosamund Pike	Fugitive Pieces	
2009; 30th Genie Awards
2009; 30th Genie Awards	Martha Burns	Love and Savagery	
2009; 30th Genie Awards	Liane Balaban	One Week	
2009; 30th Genie Awards	Marie Brassard	Heat Wave (Les grandes chaleurs)	
2009; 30th Genie Awards	Isabel Richer	Babine	
2009; 30th Genie Awards	Sonia Vachon	5150 Elm's Way (5150, rue des ormes)	

== 2010s ==
Year	Nominee	Film	Ref
2010; 31st Genie Awards
2010; 31st Genie Awards	Minnie Driver	Barney's Version	
2010; 31st Genie Awards	Sonja Bennett	Cole	
2010; 31st Genie Awards	Anne-Élisabeth Bossé	Heartbeats (Les Amours imaginaires)	
2010; 31st Genie Awards	Terra Hazelton	FUBAR 2	
2010; 31st Genie Awards	Mary Walsh	Crackie	
2011; 32nd Genie Awards
2011; 32nd Genie Awards	Sophie Nélisse	Monsieur Lazhar	
2011; 32nd Genie Awards	Roxana Condurache	The Whistleblower	
2011; 32nd Genie Awards	Hélène Florent	Café de Flore	
2011; 32nd Genie Awards	Julie Le Breton	Starbuck	
2011; 32nd Genie Awards	Charlotte Sullivan	Citizen Gangster	
2012; 1st Canadian Screen Awards
2012; 1st Canadian Screen Awards	Seema Biswas	Midnight's Children	
2012; 1st Canadian Screen Awards	Fefe Dobson	Home Again	
2012; 1st Canadian Screen Awards	Alice Morel-Michaud	The Pee-Wee 3D: The Winter That Changed My Life (Les Pee-Wee 3D)	
2012; 1st Canadian Screen Awards	Gabrielle Miller	Moving Day	
2012; 1st Canadian Screen Awards	Sabrina Ouazani	Inch'Allah	
2013; 2nd Canadian Screen Awards
2013; 2nd Canadian Screen Awards	Sarah Gadon	Enemy	
2013; 2nd Canadian Screen Awards	Florence Blain Mbaye	Another House (L'autre maison)	
2013; 2nd Canadian Screen Awards	Evelyne Brochu	Tom at the Farm (Tom à la ferme)	
2013; 2nd Canadian Screen Awards	Mackenzie Davis	The F Word	
2013; 2nd Canadian Screen Awards	Jennifer Podemski	Empire of Dirt	
2014; 3rd Canadian Screen Awards
2014; 3rd Canadian Screen Awards	Suzanne Clément	Mommy	
2014; 3rd Canadian Screen Awards	Sandrine Bisson	1987	
2014; 3rd Canadian Screen Awards	Gil Hae-yeon	In Her Place	
2014; 3rd Canadian Screen Awards	Catherine St-Laurent	You're Sleeping Nicole (Tu dors Nicole)	
2014; 3rd Canadian Screen Awards	Mia Wasikowska	Maps to the Stars	
2015; 4th Canadian Screen Awards
2015; 4th Canadian Screen Awards	Joan Allen	Room	
2015; 4th Canadian Screen Awards	Cynthia Ashperger	The Waiting Room	
2015; 4th Canadian Screen Awards	Christine Beaulieu	The Mirage (Le Mirage)	
2015; 4th Canadian Screen Awards	Balinder Johal	Beeba Boys	
2015; 4th Canadian Screen Awards	Mylène Mackay	Endorphine	
2016; 5th Canadian Screen Awards
2016; 5th Canadian Screen Awards	Molly Parker	Weirdos	
2016; 5th Canadian Screen Awards	Nathalie Baye	It's Only the End of the World (Juste la fin du monde)	
2016; 5th Canadian Screen Awards	Kwena Bellemare-Boivin	Before the Streets (Avant les rues)	
2016; 5th Canadian Screen Awards	Sherri Shepherd	Jean of the Joneses	
2016; 5th Canadian Screen Awards	Gabrielle Tremblay	Those Who Make Revolution Halfway Only Dig Their Own Graves (Ceux qui font les révolutions à moitié n'ont fait que se creuser un tombeau)	
2017; 6th Canadian Screen Awards
2017; 6th Canadian Screen Awards	Bahar Noohian	Ava	
2017; 6th Canadian Screen Awards	Oluniké Adeliyi	Boost	
2017; 6th Canadian Screen Awards	Lucinda Armstrong Hall	Porcupine Lake	
2017; 6th Canadian Screen Awards	Clare Coulter	Cross My Heart (Les Rois mongols)	
2017; 6th Canadian Screen Awards	Brigitte Poupart	Ravenous (Les Affamés)	
2018; 7th Canadian Screen Awards
2018; 7th Canadian Screen Awards	Sarah Gadon	The Great Darkened Days (La grande noirceur)	
2018; 7th Canadian Screen Awards	Irlande Côté	A Colony (Une colonie)	
2018; 7th Canadian Screen Awards	Romane Denis	Slut in a Good Way (Charlotte a du fun)	
2018; 7th Canadian Screen Awards	Anna Lambe	The Grizzlies	
2018; 7th Canadian Screen Awards	Kate Moyer	Our House	
2019; 8th Canadian Screen Awards
2019; 8th Canadian Screen Awards	Nour Belkhiria	Antigone	
2019; 8th Canadian Screen Awards	Leanna Chea	14 Days, 12 Nights (14 jours, 12 nuits)	
2019; 8th Canadian Screen Awards	Larissa Corriveau	Ghost Town Anthology (Répertoire des villes disparus)	
2019; 8th Canadian Screen Awards	Yamie Grégoire	Kuessipan	
2019; 8th Canadian Screen Awards	Alison Midstokke	Happy Face	

== 2020s ==
Year	Nominee	Film	Ref
2020; 9th Canadian Screen Awards
2020; 9th Canadian Screen Awards	Mary Walsh	Happy Place	
2020; 9th Canadian Screen Awards	Agam Darshi	Funny Boy	
2020; 9th Canadian Screen Awards	Felicity Huffman	Tammy's Always Dying	
2020; 9th Canadian Screen Awards	Micheline Lanctôt	Laughter (Le Rire)	
2020; 9th Canadian Screen Awards	Amy Groening	Bone Cage	
2021; 10th Canadian Screen Awards
2021; 10th Canadian Screen Awards	Cherish Violet Blood	Scarborough	
2021; 10th Canadian Screen Awards	Tanja Björk	The Noise of Engines (Le Bruit des moteurs)	
2021; 10th Canadian Screen Awards	Kate Corbett	The Righteous	
2021; 10th Canadian Screen Awards	Marine Johnson	Drunken Birds (Les Oiseaux ivres)	
2021; 10th Canadian Screen Awards	Gail Maurice	Night Raiders	

== See also ==
- Prix Iris for Best Supporting Actress
