= 1973 Governor General's Awards =

Canadian literary award

Each winner of the 1973 Governor General's Awards for Literary Merit was selected by a panel of judges administered by the Canada Council for the Arts. The winners were given a $2500 cash prize.

== Winners ==
=== English Language ===
- Fiction: Rudy Wiebe, The Temptations of Big Bear.
- Poetry or Drama: Miriam Mandel, Lions at her Face.
- Non-Fiction: Michael Bell, Painters in a New Land.

=== French Language ===
- Fiction: Réjean Ducharme, L'Hiver de force.
- Poetry or Drama: Roland Giguère, La Main au Feu.
- Non-Fiction: Albert Faucher, Québec en Amérique au 19eme Siècle.
