= Monique Spaziani =

Canadian actress

Monique Spaziani (born December 16, 1957, in Montreal, Quebec) is a Canadian actress. She is a three-time Genie Award nominee for Best Actress, receiving nominations at the 3rd Genie Awards in 1982 for Happy Memories (Les Beaux souvenirs), at the 7th Genie Awards in 1986 for The Alley Cat (Le Matou) and at the 10th Genie Awards in 1989 for The Revolving Doors (Les Portes tournantes).

Her other credits have included the films The Tin Flute (Bonheur d'occasion), The Caretaker's Lodge (La Conciergerie), Map of the Human Heart, Aurore, I Killed My Mother (J'ai tué ma mère), French Immersion, Water Child (L'Enfant d'eau), File 13 (Filière 13) and Laurence Anyways, and the television series L'Amour avec un Grand A, Million Dollar Babies, Apparences, Vertige, Mensonges and La Faille (2019).

== Personal life ==
She was the partner of director Francis Mankiewicz, whom she met while filming Happy Memories, until his death in 1993. She was subsequently married to actor Emmanuel Bilodeau. Her daughter Philomène Bilodeau is an actress, who starred in the television series Toute la vie.
