= Réjean Ducharme =

Canadian writer

- Born: August 12, 1941
- Died: August 21, 2017 (aged 76)
- Writing career
- Language: French

Réjean Ducharme (August 12, 1941 – August 21, 2017) was a Canadian writer, novelist and playwright who resided in Montreal. He was known for his reclusive personality and did not appear at any public functions since his first successful book was published in 1966. A common theme of his early work was the rejection of the adult world by children.

L'Avalée des avalés (Swallowed), Ducharme's first novel, was short-listed for the 1966 Prix Goncourt, even though the author was only 24 years old and unknown. That same year, the book won the 1966 Governor General's Award for Poetry or Drama (Poésie et théâtre). L'Avalée des avalés later won the 2005 French version of Canada Reads, where it was defended by actress Sophie Cadieux.

In the 1992 movie Léolo, the main character spends much of his time reading and thinking about L'Avalée des avalés.

In 2017, Ducharme died of natural causes at age 76 in Montreal.

In summer 2021, the city's Sud-Ouest borough renamed its library from the Bibliotheque Georges-Vanier to the Bibliothèque Réjean-Ducharme in his honour.

== Bibliography ==
- L'Avalée des avalés – 1966 (winner of the 1966 Governor General's Awards)
  - translated into English as The Swallower Swallowed by Barbara Bray
  - translated into English as Swallowed by Madeleine Stratford (Montreal: Véhicule Press, 2020).
- Le Nez qui voque – 1967
  - translated into English as Miss Take by Will Browning
- L'Océantume – 1968
- La fille de Christophe Colomb – 1969
  - translated into English as The Daughter of Christopher Columbus by Will Browning
- L'Hiver de force – 1973 winner of the 1973 Governor General's Award for Fiction)
  - translated in English as "Wild to Mild" by Robert Guy Scully
- Les Enfantômes – 1976
- Good Riddance (Les Bons débarras) – 1980 (film screenplay)
- Happy Memories (Les Beaux souvenirs) – 1982 (film screenplay)
- Ha ha!... – 1982 (winner of the 1982 Governor General's Award for Drama)
- Dévadé – 1990
- Va savoir – 1994 (nominated for a Governor General's Award
  - translated into English as Go Figure by Will Browning
- Gros mots – 1999

== See also ==
- List of writers from Quebec
