= Alligator Shoes =

1981 Canadian drama film

- Directed by: Clay Borris
- Written by: Clay Borris
- Produced by: Don Haig; Clay Borris; John F. Phillips
- Starring: Clay Borris; Garry Borris; Ronalda Jones
- Cinematography: John F. Phillips
- Edited by: Gordon McClellan
- Music by: Murray McLauchlan
- Release date: 1981
- Running time: 99 minutes
- Country: Canada
- Language: English

Alligator Shoes is a 1981 Canadian drama film directed by Clay Borris.

Written by Borris as a fictionalization of his own family story, and acted predominantly by Borris and his real family, the film centres on Mike and Bin Allard (brothers Clay and Garry Borris), two brothers in Toronto whose lives are turned upside down when their aunt Danielle (stage actress Ronalda Jones, in the film's only major role played by a professional actress) comes to stay with their family after having a nervous breakdown. Made for a budget of just $400,000 ($1.33 million today), the film was an expansion of Rose's House, a short film Borris previously directed for CBC Television.

The film premiered in the Director's Fortnight section of the 1981 Cannes Film Festival. It had its theatrical premiere in Canada in June 1981.

The film received four Genie Award nominations at the 3rd Genie Awards in 1982: Best Actress (Jones), Best Original Screenplay (Borris), Best Cinematography (John F. Phillips) and Best Editing (Gordon McClellan). It received the Golden Ducat at the 1981 International Filmfestival Mannheim-Heidelberg in Mannheim.
