= Top Priority (film) =

- Directed by: Ishu Patel
- Produced by: Ishu Patel
- Starring: Walter Massey; Vlasta Vrana; Maureen Hill; Paula Mazzzone
- Music by: Normand Roger
- Animation by: Ishu Patel
- Production company: National Film Board of Canada
- Release date: 1981
- Running time: 9 minutes
- Country: Canada
- Language: English

Top Priority is a Canadian animated short film, directed by Ishu Patel and released in 1981. Adapted from a short story by South African writer Enver Carim, the film centres on a family in an impoverished country who are in desperate need of water to irrigate their farmland, only to discover that the government prioritizes war with a neighbouring country over the welfare of its own citizens.

The film's voice cast includes Walter Massey, Vlasta Vrana, Maureen Hill and Paula Mazzone.

The film was a Genie Award nominee for Best Theatrical Short Film at the 3rd Genie Awards in 1982.
