= Sheila Graber =

British academic and animator

- Born: 1940 (age 85–86)
- Occupations: Animator; Teacher
- Employer: Sunderland University
- Known for: Animating Paddington and Just So Stories
- Website: https://sganimation.co.uk

Sheila Graber (born 1940) is a British animator, artist and Visiting Professor at the University of Sunderland. She animated the children's television series Paddington, has taught in schools and universities, and has won numerous awards.

== Early life ==
Graber was born in 1940 and raised in South Shields, County Durham, England. She gained a National Diploma in Fine Art from the Sunderland Art College (now part of the University of Sunderland) in 1959. In 1960, she studied for her Art Teachers’ Diploma with Mrs Burroughs and team in Birmingham School for Training Art teachers. Influenced by the educational ideas of Herbert Read, particularly those expressed in Education through Art (1943), she adopted the principle that “everyone is an artist in their own way,” which informed her teaching practice.. After twenty years of teaching, Graber first began to make animated films in 1970, initially using the medium to teach her students another form of art, following on from painting, clay modelling, woodwork and metalwork.

== Animation ==
Between 1975 and 1980, Graber created a selection of animated shorts which were shown worldwide. One animation, Mondrian, about the Dutch painter Piet Mondrian was screened at the Tate Gallery, Mondrian’s own house in the Netherlands, the Open University and British Broadcasting Corporation's children's television series Blue Peter.

In 1985, Graber worked for Filmfair, and created the cut out animation for Paddington Bear Specials for the television series Paddington. She also animated the 1983 Marble Arch/Interama/Strengholt Films series Just So Stories, adapted from a collection of ten children's stories of the same name, written by Rudyard Kipling.

Newly divorced in 1970 Sheila began experimenting at home with Super 8 film animation. By 1975 Tate Gallery invited her to make an animation on William Blake for their Exhibition. She created it in the sculpture hall at the gallery to encourage the general public to see the use of animation in education. 1980 Sheila left her role as head of Creative Studies at a large comprehensive school as she was invited by Nicole Jouve of Interama. Agent for The films of Jean Renoir and The Magic Roundabout to create A 10x10 minute animated series of The Just So Stories for World TV. This she did at home single handed in one year using classic hand painted cels, scripting, recording mixing sound track, drawing, tracing, painting, filming on 16mm. A World Record. The series was screened in over 15 countries. She has since pursued a career as a full-time professional artist animator and educator.

Some of Sheila's animation art work is stored by the BFI Animation Archives Many of Graber's films are screened by the BFI and held in The North East Film Archive and the archive of the Institute of Amateur Cinematographers film and video institute , including a number she made as the introduction for events and conferences hosted by that organisation.

In 2020 the North East Film Archive produced a DVD of her animated work.

== Later life ==
In 2001, Sheila took a position at the University of Teesside, as the Animator in Residence. Commenting on her appointment, she said, "I’m hoping to work ... on making a film and explore the potential of computer animation." After creating over 60 shorts and three series for World TV, she teamed up with fellow director Jen Miller in 1996 to form the company Sheila Graber Animation Ltd. In 2004 she moved to the Republic of Ireland to open a studio to provide guidance and inspiration to a new generation of animators, before taking up a position at the University of Sunderland later that same year. Speaking of her role as Senior Research and Teaching Fellow in Animation, Graber said, "it's great to work with older students. It's a real two-way process and I hope I inspire them as much as they inspire me." As of 2008, Graber continues to work at the university.

On 19 November 2007 she created a YouTube account under the name Arty Cat. She has been using it to upload her animations.

In 2012 Sheila published a book entitled "My Tyneside" this was a personal journey from 1951 to 2004.

In 2021 she published "Sheila from Shields her cat and the Rainbow" to complement an exhibition at South Shields Museum.

In 2021 Sheila held an exhibition at the Customs House in South Shields, much of her work was sold in aid of three local charities.

== Awards and recognition ==
Graber was awarded an Honorary Fellowship from the University of Sunderland in 1998 for Outstanding services to Education and Art.

In 2003, Graber won an award in the "Best Digital Image Designer Category" at the North East and Border regional award ceremony of the Royal Television Society, and had another production nominated for "The Wow Factor" – two minutes of video which could produce a collective "Wow" from the judges. In 2004, one of her works was a finalist in the "Best Non-Broadcast Factual Production Category". and was awarded the annual Lifetime Achievement Award.

She was awarded the Freedom of the Borough of South Tyneside on 26 July 2023.
