= The Amateur (1981 film) =

1981 film directed by Charles Jarrott

- Theatrical release poster
- Directed by: Charles Jarrott
- Screenplay by: Robert Littell; Diana Maddox
- Based on: The Amateur by Robert Littell
- Produced by: Garth H. Drabinsky; Joel B. Michaels
- Starring: John Savage; Christopher Plummer; Marthe Keller; Arthur Hill; Nicholas Campbell; George Coe; John Marley; Ed Lauter
- Cinematography: John Coquillon
- Edited by: Stephan Fanfara
- Music by: Ken Wannberg
- Production companies: Balkan Productions; Tiberius Film Productions
- Distributed by: Pan-Canadian Film Distributors (Canada); 20th Century Fox (international)
- Release date: December 11, 1981
- Running time: 112 minutes
- Country: Canada
- Language: English
- Budget: $10 million
- Box office: $6.9 million (worldwide)

For the 2025 version of this film, please see The Amateur (2025 film).

The Amateur is a 1981 Canadian spy thriller film directed by Charles Jarrott, and written by Robert Littell and Diana Maddox, based on Littell's 1981 novel of the same name. It stars John Savage, Christopher Plummer, Marthe Keller, Arthur Hill, Nicholas Campbell, George Coe, John Marley and Ed Lauter. The film is about a CIA analyst (Savage) who goes rogue to avenge the murder of his fiancée.

The film was released by Pan-Canadian Film Distributors on December 11, 1981 and it received mixed reviews. The film was nominated for several Genie Awards in 1982, including for Best Motion Picture. Another film adaptation of the novel was released in 2025.

The film was released in the United States in February of 1982 and it was a box office failure with $2.4 million domestically and $4.5 million internationally, earning $6.9 million in worldwide.

== Plot ==
When his fiancée is murdered by terrorists, a Central Intelligence Agency (CIA) cryptographer named Charles Heller is devastated. His boss allows him to use the CIA's key computer, Big Bertha, to review a facsimile of an 1586 letter from Mary Queen of Scots in order that he can begin "looking for numerical sequences, acrostics, Elizabethan substitution systems and Bacon's biliteral cyphers." (Note: Some of the ciphers of Mary Queen of Scots were not deciphered until 2023.) He then returns to his boss with blackmail on his superiors, based on access to the computer. He then demands that he is to be sent on a field assignment into Czechoslovakia to assassinate those responsible for the death of his fiancée. Just as he enters the field, the CIA locates the stolen material he had been using to blackmail the agency, eliminating their need to cooperate with him. So he is behind the Iron Curtain, inadequately trained, and without support.

He nonetheless reaches his safe house, meets his local contact, Elisabeth, and kills two members of the terrorist band. He discovers the location of their ringleader, Schräger, the man who had killed his fiancée, but attracts the attention of the local security forces, who begin following him.

At the site where he expects his final showdown with Schräger he is ambushed by his CIA trainer, Anderson, who explains that Schräger is a double agent working for the CIA who had killed his fiancée under orders to establish his bona fides by murdering an American. He insists that Heller explain his own rogue status to Schräger so that the terrorist, who believes Heller was sent by the CIA to kill him, will continue to work with the Americans.

A senior agent of the local security service, Lakos, overhears all this.

Schräger arrives, kills Anderson in a shootout, and is killed by Heller. Lakos, who has come to respect Heller, helps him and Elisabeth escape back to the west in exchange for his promise to write a book embarrassing the CIA.

== Cast ==
- John Savage as Charles 'Charlie' Heller
- Christopher Plummer as Professor Antonin Lakos
- Marthe Keller as Elisabeth Vaculik
- Arthur Hill as Brewer
- Nicholas Campbell as Terrorist Horst Schräger
- Chapelle Jaffe as Terrorist Gretchen Frank
- Miguel Fernandes as Terrorist Luis Botero
- George Coe as Rutledge
- Jan Rubeš as Sam Kaplan
- John Marley as Frank Molton
- Ed Lauter as Col. Anderson
- Lynne Griffin as Sarah Kaplan

== Production ==
The film was shot from December 1980 through February 1981 in Toronto, Ontario doubling for Washington, D.C., Prague, and Vienna, Austria with additional second unit work done on location in Vienna. The CIA Training Farm depicted in the film was in fact the Toronto Zoo.

=== Filming locations ===
- Kleinburg, Ontario
- Toronto, Ontario
- Oakville, Ontario
- Valley Halla Estate, Scarborough, Toronto, Ontario
- Vienna, Austria

== Critical reception ==
In a review for The New York Times, Janet Maslin was positive in her assessment writing, "As cold-war thrillers go, this is an efficient and enjoyable one, with a good cast, a clever if overburdened plot, and a stylish brand of mayhem."

In a review for the Chicago Sun-Times, Roger Ebert gave the film two stars out of four and wrote, "After earning our attention with its understated, powerful opening, the movie develops into a routine, even laughable, spy thriller".

== Accolades ==
1982 nominations from the Genie Awards:

- Best Achievement in Art Direction/Production Design - Trevor Williams
- Best Achievement in Overall Sound - Dennis Drummond, Wayne Griffin, Michael O'Farrell
- Best Achievement in Sound Editing - Austin Grimaldi, Joe Grimaldi, Peter Shewchuk, Dino Pigat
- Best Motion Picture - Garth Drabinsky, Joel B. Michaels
- Best Performance by a Foreign Actor - John Savage
- Best Performance by a Foreign Actress - Marthe Keller
- Best Performance by an Actor in a Leading Role - Christopher Plummer
- Best Performance by an Actor in a Supporting Role - Nicholas Campbell
- Best Performance by an Actress in a Supporting Role - Chapelle Jaffe
- Best Screenplay Adapted from Another Medium - Diana Maddox

== Remake ==
Development on a new adaptation of the Robert Littell novel was first announced in November 2006, with Hugh Jackman attached to star, and Evan Katz writing the screenplay. In February 2023, Hutch Parker and Dan Wilson were announced to be producing the project for 20th Century Studios with James Hawes attached as director and Rami Malek in the lead role. Malek was also listed as an executive producer on the project. In May, Rachel Brosnahan, Caitriona Balfe, Adrian Martinez, Laurence Fishburne, Holt McCallany and Julianne Nicholson were added to the cast.

Principal photography began in London in June 2023. Filming locations are scheduled for around the south-east of England, as well as France and Turkey. Filming was suspended in July due to the 2023 SAG-AFTRA strike. Filming resumed by December 2023. It was later confirmed that Takehiro Hira was also cast. In October 2024, it was determined by the Writers Guild of America that Ken Nolan and Gary Spinelli would receive screenplay credit, while Katz, Scott Z. Burns, Stephen Chin, Scott Frank, Hawes, Littell, Diana Maddox, and Patrick Ness contributed additional literary material.

== See also ==
- American Assassin (2017 film)
