= Zea (film) =

- Directed by: André Leduc; Jean-Jacques Leduc
- Produced by: Robert Forget
- Cinematography: Eric Chamberlain
- Edited by: Werner Nold
- Music by: Ralph Vaughan Williams
- Production company: National Film Board of Canada
- Release date: 1981
- Running time: 5 minutes
- Country: Canada
- Budget: $73,585

Zea is a Canadian short film, directed by André Leduc and Jean-Jacques Leduc and released in 1981.

== Premise ==
Set to a recording of the Ralph Vaughan Williams composition "Fantasia on a Theme by Thomas Tallis", the five-minute film presents a close-up depiction of a kernel of corn slowly heating up in oil until it bursts into popcorn.

== Production ==
A high-speed camera shooting 400 feet per second was used. The film had a budget of $73,585 (equivalent to $244,094 in 2025).

== Accolades ==
The film was screened at the 1981 Cannes Film Festival, where it was co-winner of the Jury Prize in the Short Film Competition. It won the Genie Award for Best Theatrical Short Film at the 3rd Genie Awards in 1982. It was named to the ALA Notable Children's Videos list in 1982.

== Works cited ==
- Evans, Gary (1991). In the National Interest: A Chronicle of the National Film Board of Canada from 1949 to 1989. University of Toronto Press. ISBN 0802027849.
