= Improper Channels =

- Theatrical release poster
- Directed by: Eric Till
- Written by: Adam Arkin; Morrie Ruvinsky; Ian Sutherland
- Produced by: Alfred Pariser; Morrie Ruvinsky; Jon Slan
- Starring: Alan Arkin; Mariette Hartley; Monica Parker; Harry Ditson; Sarah Stevens
- Cinematography: Anthony B. Richmond
- Edited by: Thom Noble
- Music by: Micky Erbe; Maribeth Solomon
- Distributed by: Crown International Pictures; Saguenay Films
- Release date: April 17, 1981
- Running time: 92 minutes
- Country: Canada
- Language: English
- Box office: $1,250,000

Improper Channels is a Canadian comedy-drama film, directed by Eric Till. Its copyright year is listed as 1979, but it was not released until 1981.

The film stars Alan Arkin and Mariette Hartley.

The film received four nominations at the 3rd Genie Awards in 1982. These were for Best Foreign Actor (Arkin), Best Foreign Actress (Hartley), Best Original Screenplay (Adam Arkin, Morrie Ruvinsky and Ian Sutherland) and Best Art Direction/Production Design (Ninkey Dalton and Charles Dunlop). Arkin won the award for Best Foreign Actor.

== Plot ==
Architect Jeff Martley and his estranged wife Diana deal with the aftermath of their daughter Nancy suffering a mild injury as the result of a car accident as a zealous social worker wrongly accuses him of child abuse and takes custody of the girl.

== Cast ==
- Alan Arkin as Jeffrey Martley
- Mariette Hartley as Diana Martley
- Monica Parker as Gloria Washburn
- Harry Ditson as Harold Clevish
- Sarah Stevens as Nancy Martley
- Danny Higham as Jack
- Leslie Yeo as Fred
- Richard W. Farrell as Fraser
- Ruth Springford as Mrs. Wharton
- Martin Yan as Hu
- Tony Rosato as Dr. Arpenthaler
- Philip Akin as Cop
- Harvey Atkin as Sergeant
- Richard Blackburn as Fraser's Assistant
- Eugene Clark as Security Guard #1
