= Juliette Huot =

Canadian actress

Juliette Huot OQ
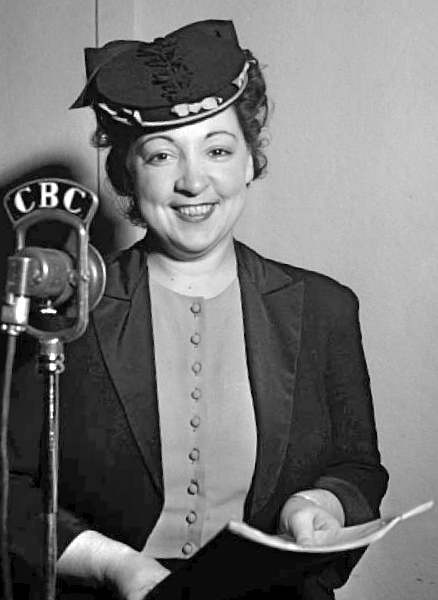
- Born: January 9, 1912; Montreal, Quebec
- Died: March 16, 2001 (aged 89); Brossard, Quebec
- Resting place: Notre Dame des Neiges Cemetery
- Occupation: actress
- Years active: 1930s-1990s
- Known for: Amanita Pestilens, The Plouffe Family, Jamais deux sans toi

Juliette Huot OQ (January 9, 1912 – March 16, 2001) was a Canadian actress from Quebec. She was most noted for her role in The Plouffe Family (Les Plouffe), for which she was a shortlisted Genie Award nominee for Best Supporting Actress at the 3rd Genie Awards in 1982.

Born in the Tétraultville district of Montreal, she began her career as a radio and stage actress in the 1930s. Her most prominent early roles were in the radio adaptation of Claude-Henri Grignon's Un homme et son péché and in Gratien Gélinas's comedy revue Fridolinades. With the rise of television in the early 1950s, she appeared in the original television version of The Plouffe Family and in 14, rue de Galais, as well as in films such as The Nightingale and the Bells (Le Rossignol et les cloches), Amanita Pestilens, The Luck of Ginger Coffey and Far from You Sweetheart (Je suis loin de toi mignonne).

Concurrently with her acting roles, in the 1960s she began appearing on Quebec television as a chef, first on the magazine show Le 5 à 6 and then as host of her own Les recettes de Juliette.

She was named to the National Order of Quebec in 1987.
