= Gabriel Arcand =

Canadian actor (born 1949)

- Born: June 4, 1949 (age 76); Deschambault, Quebec, Canada
- Occupation: Actor
- Years active: 1972–present

Gabriel Arcand (born June 4, 1949) is a Canadian actor. He is the brother of film director Denys Arcand.

== Career ==
After studying philosophy at McGill University, Arcand spent his formative professional years at La Criée in Marseille, France, and later in Poland where he studied theatre. Since he made his 1973 screen debut in his brother's first feature, La Maudite Galette, he established himself as Quebec’s iconic strong, silent type and has given subtle but powerful performances in a wide range of films such as Réjeanne Padovani, Les Plouffe, Le Crime d’Ovide Plouffe, Le Déclin de l’empire américain, Post Mortem and Congorama.

He won the Academy of Canadian Cinema and Television's award for Best Actor at the 6th Genie Awards in 1985 for his performance in The Crime of Ovide Plouffe (Le Crime d'Ovide Plouffe) and at the 2nd Canadian Screen Awards in 2014 for The Dismantling (Le Démantèlement), and the award for Best Supporting Actor at the 8th Genie Awards in 1987 for Decline of the American Empire. He was also nominated for Best Actor at the 3rd Genie Awards in 1982 for Les Plouffe and at the 20th Genie Awards for Post Mortem, and for Best Supporting Actor at the 2nd Genie Awards in 1981 for Suzanne and at the 20th Genie Awards in 1999 for Le Grand serpent du monde.

== Filmography ==
- Dirty Money (La Maudite galette) - 1972
- You Are Warm, You Are Warm (Tu brûles... tu brûles...) - 1973
- Réjeanne Padovani - 1973
- Gina - 1974
- Little Tougas (Ti-Cul Tougas) - 1975
- Let's Talk About Love (Parlez-nous d'amour) - 1975
- The Machine Age (L'Âge de la machine) - 1977
- Panic (Panique) (1977)
- Bye, See You Monday (Au revoir à lundi) - 1979
- Suzanne - 1980
- The Coffin Affair (L'Affaire coffin) - 1980
- The Plouffe Family (Les Plouffe) - 1981
- Thunder Drum (Mémoire battante) - 1983
- Empire, Inc. - 1983
- The Crime of Ovide Plouffe (Le Crime d'Ovide Plouffe) - 1984
- Agnes of God - 1985
- The Decline of the American Empire (Le Déclin de l'empire américain) - 1986
- The Heat Line (La Ligne de chaleur) - 1987
- The Revolving Doors (Les Portes tournantes) - 1988
- Unfaithful Mornings (Les Matins infidèles) - 1988
- L'air de rien - 1989
- Nelligan - 1991
- Blood of the Hunter - 1995
- The Big Snake of the World (Le Grand serpent du monde) - 1999
- Post Mortem - 1999
- Una Casa con Vista al Mar - 2001
- Chaos and Desire (La Turbulence des fluides) - 2002
- Jean Moulin, une affaire française - 2003
- Folle embellie - 2004
- Congorama - 2006
- Mommy Is at the Hairdresser's (Maman est chez le coiffeur) - 2008
- Karakara - 2012
- The Bossé Empire (L'Empire Bo$$é) - 2012
- The Dismantling (Le Démantèlement) - 2013
- A Kid (Le Fils de Jean) - 2016
- Maria Chapdelaine - 2021
- Classé secret (2022–) (TV series)
