= Ken Nolan =

American screenwriter and novelist

- Born: Detroit, Michigan, U.S.
- Education: University of Oregon
- Occupation: Writer
- Writing career
- Genres: War, biographical, historical fiction, thriller, military fiction, action adventure
- Notable works: Black Hawk Down; The Company; Transformers: The Last Knight
- Notable awards: WGA Award for Television

Ken Nolan (/ˈnoʊlən/) is an American screenwriter and novelist best known for adapting the 2001 biographical war film Black Hawk Down from the non-fiction book of the same name.

== Life and career ==
Nolan was born in Detroit and raised in Buffalo, New York and Portland, Oregon. He applied twice to the UCLA Film School but was turned down both times. He ultimately attended the University of Oregon, earning an English degree. He moved to Los Angeles, California in the early 1990s to pursue a career as a screenwriter, working at Richard Dreyfuss' company using The Screenwriter's Workbook by Syd Field as a guide. He wrote several screenplays before breaking through in 1994, writing a series of spec scripts for Warner Bros. and Universal Pictures.

His first produced screenplay was an adaptation of Mark Bowden's 1999 non-fiction book Black Hawk Down, which was ultimately made into an Academy Award-winning film of the same name by Ridley Scott. He initially wrote a 60-page treatment and writing a total of eight drafts before Scott was attached to the project by producer Jerry Bruckheimer. Nolan was one of several writers (including Steven Zaillian, Stephen Gaghan, Eric Roth) who contributed to the final shooting script, though he was the only one to receive on-screen credit.

Nolan's next major project was the TNT miniseries The Company, for which he received a Writers Guild of America Award for Television: Long Form – Adapted. In early 2015, he published his first novel, The Spawn.

He replaced Ehren Kruger as the writer of the Transformers film series, penning Transformers: The Last Knight. Nolan wrote Only the Brave, a 2017 drama film which, like Black Hawk Down, is a work of historical fiction based on true events.

== Works ==
Film

- Black Hawk Down (2001)
- Transformers: The Last Knight (2017); replaced Ehren Kruger
- Only the Brave (2017)
- Transformers: Rise of the Beasts (additional literary material) (2023)
- The Amateur (2025)

Television

- The Company (2007)

Print

- The Spawn (2015)
