= Gordon McClellan =

Canadian film editor

Gordon McClellan is a Canadian film editor."Gordon McClellan, CCE". Canadian Cinema Editors.

His editing credits include the award-winning television series Road to Avonlea (38 episodes, from 1990 to 1996); Francis Mankiewicz's Love and Hate: The Story of Colin and JoAnn Thatcher; Clay Borris' Alligator Shoes, and Allan King's Leonardo: A Dream of Flight (1999). He is a three-time Gemini Award nominee.

McClellan is a member of the Canadian Cinema Editors."Gordon McClellan, CCE". Canadian Cinema Editors.

== Recognition ==
- 2003 Directors Guild of Canada DGC Craft Award for "Outstanding Achievement in Picture Editing - Witchblade - Nominee
- 1998 Gemini Award for "Best Picture Editing in a Dramatic Program or Series" - Giant Mine- Nominee
- 1993 Gemini Award for "Best Picture Editing in a Dramatic Program or Series" - Road to Avonlea - Nominee
- 1990 Gemini Award for "Best Picture Editing in a Dramatic Program or Series" - Love and Hate: The Story of Colin and JoAnn Thatcher – Nominee
- 1982 Genie Award for "Best Achievement in Film Editing" - Alligator Shoes - Nominee
