= Ronalda Jones =

Canadian actress and writer

Ronalda Jones is a Canadian actress and writer. Predominantly a stage actress, she gained wider notice for her performance in the 1981 film Alligator Shoes, for which she received a Genie Award nomination for Best Actress at the 3rd Genie Awards.

Originally from Prince Edward Island, Jones studied drama at the University of Windsor.

Despite her critically acclaimed performance in Alligator Shoes, Jones had difficulty landing another film role due to the film's relatively limited audience. Her only other film or television performing credit was a 1985 episode of Night Heat. She continued to perform and direct on stage, including roles in Steve Petch's Cousins and Robert Locke's The Dolly, and directing a production of John Patrick Shanley's Danny and the Deep Blue Sea. She subsequently worked in documentary production, writing several episodes of Biography and the documentary film Blacklight Dreams: The 25 Years of the Famous People Players, and working on the production teams of the documentary films The Bunny Years, Olga: The Last Grand Duchess, Sarah McLachlan: A Life of Music and The Incomparable Jackie Richardson.
