= Happy Memories =

- Les Beaux Souvenirs
- Directed by: Francis Mankiewicz
- Written by: Réjean Ducharme
- Produced by: Jean Dansereau
- Starring: Julie Vincent; Monique Spaziani; Paul Hébert
- Cinematography: Georges Dufaux
- Edited by: André Corriveau
- Music by: Jean Cousineau
- Production companies: National Film Board of Canada; Lamy, Spencer et Compagnie
- Release date: October 8, 1981
- Running time: 114 minutes
- Country: Canada
- Language: French

Happy Memories (French: Les Beaux Souvenirs) is a Canadian drama film, directed by Francis Mankiewicz and released in 1981. Identified by film critics as a spiritual if not literal sequel to his previous film Good Riddance (Les Bons débarras), the film stars Julie Vincent as Viviane, a young woman returning home for the first time since running away several years earlier.

The film also stars Monique Spaziani as Viviane's sister Marie, who has an incestuous relationship with their father (Paul Hébert); Andrée Lachapelle as their mother, who also abandoned the family years earlier; and Rémy Girard as their mother's new partner.

The film received three Genie Award nominations at the 3rd Genie Awards: Best Actress (Spaziani), Best Screenplay (Réjean Ducharme) and Best Original Score (Jean Cousineau).
