= Claire Pimparé =

Canadian actress (born 1952)

Claire Pimparé (born August 22, 1952) is a Canadian actress. She is best known for her longtime television role as Passe-Carreau in the children's television series Passe-Partout, and her role as Gabrielle in the film Yesterday, for which she garnered a Genie Award nomination as Best Actress at the 1st Genie Awards.

In 1986, she hosted Mon corps, c'est mon corps, a television special produced by Télé-Québec and the National Film Board to educate children on how to protect themselves against child sexual abuse.

She also had supporting roles in the films The Apparition (L'Apparition), Ticket to Heaven, Mario and Love Me (Love-moi), and the television series Marisol and La galère.

Her son Dominic James is a filmmaker.
