= Canada: The Great Experiment =

Canadian television series

- Genre: Education
- Starring: Colin Fox
- Narrated by: John A. Macdonald
- No. of episodes: 13

Production
- Running time: 30 minutes

Original release
- Network: TVOntario
- Release: 1981 – 1982

Canada: The Great Experiment is an educational television show which was produced and broadcast by TVOntario in 1981–82. The series was narrated by Prime Minister John A. Macdonald, played by veteran actor Colin Fox.

== Episode list ==
13 or 14 episodes were produced. They were:

1. "Power Shift"
2. "One Dominion"
3. "The Reasons Why"
4. "From Sea to Shining Sea"
5. "For the Good of the Party"
6. "The People's House"

The rest of the list is in an unknown order.

1. "Of Limited Power"
2. "The Decision Makers"
3. "A Creature of the Province"
4. "To Serve With Honour"
5. "The Third Branch"
6. "Pressure Point"
7. "The Nation Within"

All episodes were around 30 minutes in length.
