= Joel B. Michaels =

Canadian film producer and actor

Joel Bialys Michaels is a film producer and actor. His notable work includes The Changeling for which he won a Best Motion Picture and a Golden Reel Award.

His other work includes The Philadelphia Experiment, Universal Soldier, Stargate, Lolita, Terminator 3: Rise of the Machines, Basic Instinct 2 and Terminator Salvation.

== Filmography ==
He was a producer in all films unless otherwise noted.

=== Film ===
Year	Film	Credit
1971	The Peace Killers	
1975	Las Vegas Lady	Associate producer
1975	The Four Deuces	Associate producer
1976	Bittersweet Love	
1978	The Silent Partner	
1980	The Changeling	
1980	Tribute	
1981	The Amateur	
1982	Losin' It	Executive producer
1984	The Philadelphia Experiment	
1986	Black Moon Rising	
1992	Universal Soldier	
1993	Three of Hearts	
1994	Stargate	
1995	Last of the Dogmen	
1995	Cutthroat Island	
1997	Lolita	
2003	Terminator 3: Rise of the Machines	
2003	The Gospel of John	Executive producer
2005	Half Light	
2006	Basic Instinct 2	
2009	Terminator Salvation	Executive producer
2019	After the Wedding	
2025	The Amateur	
TBA	The Changeling	
TBA	The Falls	
TBA	The Invisible Wall	

Production manager

Year	Title	Role
1973	The Student Teachers	Production manager
1973	Your Three Minutes Are Up	Production supervisor

As writer

Year	Film
1971	The Peace Killers

=== Television ===
Year	Title	Credit	Notes
1986	Harem	Consulting producer	Television film
1986	Courage		Television film
2008−09	Terminator: The Sarah Connor Chronicles	Executive producer	
