= Yesterday (1981 film) =

- Directed by: Larry Kent (as Lawrence I. Kent)
- Written by: John Dunning; Bill La Mond
- Produced by: Don Carmody; André Link; Lawrence Nesis; John Dunning
- Starring: Vincent Van Patten; Claire Pimparé; Nicholas Campbell; Jack Wetherall; Jacques Godin; Marthe Mercure; Daniel Gadouas; Cloris Leachman; Eddie Albert
- Cinematography: Richard Ciupka
- Edited by: Debra Karen
- Music by: Paul Baillargeon
- Production company: DAL Productions
- Distributed by: Levy Films
- Release date: January 24, 1981
- Running time: 95 min
- Country: Canada
- Language: English

Yesterday (also released, in the US, as Scoring and This Time Forever and, in Canada, as Gabrielle and The Victory) is a 1981 Canadian drama film directed by Larry Kent (as Lawrence I. Kent) and starring Vincent Van Patten and Claire Pimparé. It is a love story of a young soldier maimed in Vietnam, who allows his former girlfriend to believe he is dead to spare her anguish.

== Cast ==
- Vincent Van Patten as Matt Kramer
- Claire Pimparé as Gabrielle Daneault
- Nicholas Campbell as Tony
- Jack Wetherall as "Moose"
- Jacques Godin as Mr. Daneault
- Marthe Mercure as Mrs. Daneault
- Gerard Parkes as Professor Saunders
- Daniel Gadouas as Claude Daneault
- Cloris Leachman as Mrs. Kramer
- Eddie Albert as Bart Kramer
