= Ishu Patel =

Indian-Canadian film director

Ishu Patel is an Indian-Canadian animation film director/producer and educator. During his twenty-five years at the National Film Board of Canada he developed animation techniques and styles to support his themes and vision. Since then he has produced animated spots for television and has been teaching internationally.

== Background and Studies ==
Ishu Patel was born on 20 April 1942, in the State of Gujarat, India.

He received his Bachelor of Fine Arts from M.S.University of Baroda, Gujarat, following which he was accepted into the first cohort of faculty trainees hired at the newly formed National Institute of Design, Ahmedabad, Gujarat.

This was an exceptional design school created by the Government of India under the auspice of the influential industrialist family of Gautam and Gira Sarabhai. The school was based upon the recommendations and philosophy of the American industrial designers Ray and Charles Eames, as found in The India Report.

Through a Ford Foundation Grant provided to the National Institute of Design, Ishu Patel was able to finish his post graduate studies in Graphic Design under Armin Hoffman at the Allgemeine Gewerbeschule in Basel, Switzerland, and returned to the National Institute of Design where he taught and became Head of Visual Communications.

== Career ==
A Rockefeller Foundation Scholarship brought Ishu Patel to the National Film Board of Canada to study animation filmmaking for a year, and in 1972 he joined the NFB where, for the next twenty-five years under the NFB mandate Ishu Patel produced and directed animated films and mentored young animation filmmakers.

There he both adapted and originated several notable techniques: in the abstract film Perspectrum he adapted the Norman McLaren technique of multiple passes and variable exposures; the films Afterlife and Top Priority were the result of accidentally discovering, and then developing, the under-lit plasticine technique; for the film Paradise he developed the under-lit pin hole technique with multiple passes; and for The Bead Game he created the procedures for moving thousands of tiny beads under an ever-zooming-outward camera.

He co-produced animation projects with NHK of Japan and Channel Four of Britain, and contributed French language segments to Sesame Street for the Canadian Broadcasting Corporation.

His many international awards include the British Academy Award, two Oscar nominations, the Silver Bear Award at the Berlin Film Festival, Grand Prix at the Annecy International Animation Film Festival, and Grand Prix at the Montreal World Film Festival. He is particularly known for his 1977 film Bead Game which was nominated for an Academy Award.

== Teaching and Master Classes ==
Through the National Film Board of Canada Outreach Program Ishu Patel conducted animation workshops with Inuit artists of Cape Dorset, with healthcare fieldworkers in Ghana, and with students in the former Yugoslavia, Korea, Japan and the United States. During those years he returned regularly to Ahmedabad, India where he often taught his approaches and techniques to the animation students at his alma mater the National Institute of Design, and contributed some assistance in formulating the animation program.

After leaving the NFBC he conducted student workshops and Master Classes throughout Asia, mentoring young faculty and developing curricula. He has conducted Master Classes at Bezalel Academy of Art and Design, Jerusalem, and the Animation Image Society of Toronto, at the School of Animation, Communication University of China, Beijing, and at the School of Animation, Southwest University of Nationalities, Chengdu, China. Ishu Patel was Special Guest and conducted screenings and a master class at the 7th. Big Cartoon Festival in Moscow, Russia, November 2014. He was visiting professor at the School of Art, Design and Media, Nanyang Technological University, Singapore.

== Filmography ==
- Moondust
- Divine Fate
- Paradise (Paradis)
- Top Priority
- Afterlife
- Bead Game
- Perspectrum
- How Death Came to Earth

== Awards ==
Moondust:

- 2009: AWARD OF EXCELLENCE - ANIMATION, 50th Annual Illustration Exhibition, New York, USA

Divine Fate:

- 1995: UNICEF PRIZE, Ottawa International Animation Film Festival, Ottawa, CANADA
- 1995: SILVER MEDAL - ECOLOGY, Medikinale International Film Festival, Parma, ITALY
- 1994: SPECIAL DISTINCTION FOR ITS MESSAGE, Annecy International Animation Film Festival, Annecy, FRANCE

Paradise/Paradis:

- 1985: OSCAR NOMINATION FOR BEST ANIMATED SHORT, 57th Annual Academy of Motion Picture Arts and Sciences, Hollywood, California, USA
- 1985: SILVER BEAR AWARD, 35th Berlin Film Festival, Berlin, GERMANY
- 1985: SPECIAL JURY AWARD, 25th International Animation Film Festival, Annecy, FRANCE
- 1985: FIRST PRIZE FOR THEATRICAL SHORT, Melbourne Film Festival, Melbourne, AUSTRALIA
- 1985: SPECIAL AWARD BEST FILM FOR YOUNG PEOPLE, 23rd International Film Festival for Children and Young People, Gijon, SPAIN
- 1985: FIRST PRIZE, 1st Los Angeles International Animation Celebration, Los Angeles, USA

Top Priority:

- 1983: BLUE RIBBON HUMAN CONCERN AWARD, 25th American Film Festival, New York, New York, USA
- 1982: BEST SHORT FILM, XXIV Seaman International De Cinema, Barcelona, SPAIN
- 1982: SPECIAL RECOGNITION OF MERIT, Los Angeles Film Exposition Filmex, Los Angeles, USA

Afterlife:

- 1979: GRAND-PRIX, 12th International Animation Film Festival, Annecy, FRANCE
- 1979: OUTSTANDING ACHIEVEMENT AWARD, London Film Festival, London, ENGLAND
- 1979: SPECIAL HONOUR, Los Angeles International Film Exposition Filmex, Los Angeles, USA
- 1978: GRAND PRIX DE MONTREAL, Festival des Films du Monde, categorie court metrage, Montreal, CANADA
- 1978: SILVER HUGO, 14th International Film Festival, Chicago, USA
- 1978: ETROG AWARD: BEST ANIMATED FILM, Canadian Film Awards, Toronto, CANADA

Bead Game

- 1978: OSCAR NOMINATION FOR BEST ANIMATED SHORT, 50th Annual Academy of Motion Picture Arts and Sciences, Hollywood, California, USA
- 1978: BEST SHORT FICTIONAL FILM, British Academy of Film and Television Arts, London, ENGLAND
- 1978: GOLD MEDAL, SPECIAL JURY AWARD, Greater Miami International Film Festival, Miami, USA
- 1978: AWARD OF EXCELLENCE, Film Advisory Board Inc., Los Angeles, USA
- 1978: BLUE RIBBON AWARD - VISUAL ESSAY, 20th Annual American Film Festival, New York, USA
- 1978: BEST OF CATEGORY - FILM AS ART, Pacific Association for Communication and Technology Film Festival, Honolulu, USA
- 1977: SPECIAL PRIZE FOR ANIMATION, International Documentary and Short Film Festival for Cinema and Television, Leipzig, GERMAN DEMOCRATIC REPUBLIC

== Juryships ==
- 2015: International Jury President - Animation, 18th Shanghai International Film Festival, Shanghai, CHINA
- 2014: International Jury Member, SICAF (Seoul International Cartoon & Animation Festival), Seoul, SOUTH KOREA
- 2013: International Jury Member, AniWow Student Animation Film Festival, Beijing, CHINA
- 2009: Chairperson, International Jury, Etiuda & Anima International Film Festival, Kracow, POLAND
- 1997: International Jury Member, SICAF (Seoul International Cartoon and Animation Festival), Seoul, SOUTH KOREA
- 1995: International Jury Member, Film and Video Festival on Science, Society and Development, Trivandrum, INDIA
- 1990: International Jury Member, Bombay International Film Festival for Documentary Short and Animated Films, Mumbai, INDIA
- 1987: Chairperson, International Jury, Zagreb International Animation Film Festival, Zagreb, CROATIA
- 1985: International Jury Member, 1st International Animation Film Festival HIROSHIMA '85, Hiroshima, JAPAN
