= Ticket to Heaven (film) =

- DVD cover
- Directed by: Ralph L. Thomas
- Written by: Josh Freed; Anne Cameron; Ralph L. Thomas
- Produced by: Alan Simmonds; Vivienne Leebosh; Ronald Cohen
- Starring: Nick Mancuso; Saul Rubinek; Meg Foster
- Cinematography: Richard Leiterman
- Edited by: Ron Wisman
- Music by: Micky Erbe; Maribeth Solomon
- Distributed by: Miracle Films Ltd (Canada), United Artists (US and other nations)
- Release dates: September 10, 1981 (Toronto Festival of Festivals); October 9, 1981 (U.S.)
- Running time: 109 minutes
- Country: Canada
- Language: English
- Budget: C$4,500,000

Ticket to Heaven is a 1981 Canadian drama film directed by Ralph L. Thomas and starring Nick Mancuso, Saul Rubinek, Meg Foster, Kim Cattrall, and R.H. Thomson. The plot concerns the recruiting of a man into a group portrayed to be a religious cult, and his life in the group until forcibly extracted by his family and friends. The film is based on the nonfiction book Moonwebs by Josh Freed.

== Plot ==
Following a relationship breakup, David Kappel, a twentysomething school teacher, visits what turns out to be a training camp for a religious cult. At the camp, everything is done in groups, including chanting and singing. There is also a low-calorie, low-protein diet; sleep deprivation; and constant positive reinforcement.

All of the elements of the camp begin to have an effect on David mentally. He graduates and is put to work as a volunteer laborer for the cult. In an especially powerful scene, he vomits up a hamburger and milkshake which he had just eaten in violation of cult dietary guidelines.

David sets out to work, led by cult leader Patrick. David is shocked when Patrick lies to a customer, but Patrick explains that they are only "using Satan's methods to do God's work", and that it is okay because "it's only Satan's money we're taking."

David's best friend Larry and his parents, Morley and Esther, are concerned about him. Larry visits the cult's camp and almost falls under their influence as well. He escapes with the help of Eric, a fellow camp attendee who befriends him. The latter reveals he has been visiting various cult camps, trying to find his sister. Once free, Larry returns home.

David's parents, Larry, Eric, and some other friends forcibly kidnap David, bringing him to a private home in the area and enlisting the aid of a cult deprogrammer, Linc Strunk, to help him regain his normal mindset. After some struggle, David slowly comes to recognize the cult's dishonesty and mistreatment. He is confused and when he asks about "true love", he is told that he only needs to look around him: at Larry, his brother Danny, Sarah, his parents, and everything they've done for him, and still are enduring for him. Crying, he embraces them all. Everyone reunites and embraces outside the deprogramming house, while several cult members watch from a distance.

== Cast ==
- Nick Mancuso as David Kappel
- Saul Rubinek as Larry
- Meg Foster as Ingrid
- Kim Cattrall as Ruthie
- R.H. Thomson as Linc Struc
- Jennifer Dale as Lisa
- Guy Boyd as Eric
- Dixie Seatle as Sarah
- Paul Soles as Morley Kappel
- Harvey Atkin as Mr. Stone
- Robert Joy as Patrick
- Timothy Webber as Greg
- Marcia Diamond as Esther Kappel
- Michael Zelniker as Danny
- Christopher Britton as Simon
- Claire Pimparé as Sharing Group Member
- Josh Freed as Sharing Group Member
- Michael Wincott as Gerry
- Charles Gray as Musician
- Marie-Lynn Hammond as singer at mansion

== Reception ==
=== Critical response ===
The film was selected as one of the top ten films of 1981 by the National Board of Review of Motion Pictures. Roger Ebert of the Chicago Sun-Times gave the film three and a half out of four stars, but added that the ending was less interesting and powerful than the earlier cult indoctrination scenes. Janet Maslin of The New York Times called it "an absorbing, frightening, entirely believable movie, which is particularly amazing in view of its subject matter."

On the review aggregator website Rotten Tomatoes, it has an approval rating of 80%, based on 10 reviews.

=== Accolades ===
Ticket to Heaven was nominated for fourteen 1982 Genie Awards, and won four:

Year	Award	Category	Recipients	Result
1982	Genie Awards			
1982	Genie Awards	Best Motion Picture	Ronald I. Cohen, Vivienne Leebosh	Won
1982	Genie Awards	Best Performance by an Actor in a Leading Role	Nick Mancuso	Won
1982	Genie Awards	Best Performance by an Actor in a Supporting Role	Saul Rubinek	Won
1982	Genie Awards	Best Achievement in Film Editing	Ron Wisman	Won
1982	Genie Awards	Best Achievement in Direction	Ralph L. Thomas	Nominated
1982	Genie Awards	Best Achievement in Music Score	Micky Erbe, Maribeth Solomon	Nominated
1982	Genie Awards	Best Achievement in Overall Sound	Marc Chiasson, Bruce Carwardine, Glen Gauthier	Nominated
1982	Genie Awards	Best Achievement in Sound Editing	Marc Chiasson, Glen Gauthier, Don White, David Appleby, Bruce Carwardine	Nominated
1982	Genie Awards	Best Performance by a Foreign Actor	Guy Boyd	Nominated
1982	Genie Awards	Best Performance by a Foreign Actress	Meg Foster	Nominated
1982	Genie Awards	Best Performance by an Actor in a Supporting Role	R.H. Thomson	Nominated
1982	Genie Awards	Best Performance by an Actress in a Leading Role	Kim Cattrall	Nominated
1982	Genie Awards	Best Performance by an Actress in a Supporting Role	Dixie Seatle	Nominated
1982	Genie Awards	Best Screenplay Adapted from Another Medium	Ralph L. Thomas, Anne Cameron	Nominated

== See also ==
- 3rd Genie Awards
- Cults and new religious movements in literature and popular culture
