= Silence of the North =

1981 film by Allan King

- Directed by: Allan King
- Written by: Patricia Louisianna Knop
- Based on: The Silence of the North by Olive Frederickson & Ben East
- Produced by: Robert Baylis; Murray Shostak
- Starring: Ellen Burstyn; Tom Skerritt; Gordon Pinsent
- Cinematography: Richard Leiterman
- Edited by: Arla Saare
- Music by: Allan Macmillan
- Distributed by: Universal Pictures
- Release date: October 23, 1981
- Running time: 94 minutes
- Country: Canada
- Language: English
- Box office: $1,622,898

Silence of the North is a 1981 semi-autobiographical Canadian film of author Olive Frederickson, taken from the book of the same name. The film stars Ellen Burstyn as Olive, Tom Skerritt as her first husband Walter Reamer who was killed, and Gordon Pinsent as her second husband John Frederickson. All three main actors were nominated for Genie Awards, as was the director, Allan King.

Originally, the film was set to share the title of its country music theme song, "Comes a Time" performed by Lacy J. Dalton and composed by Neil Young, but at the last minute the title of the book was retained for the film.

The film was a box office flop upon its original theatrical release, but a combination of the song winning an award and pay-TV service SelecTV picking it up 18 months later for its evening lineup, allowed the film to develop a cult following.

Canadian filmmaker Guy Maddin said in an interview that he worked as an extra in the film.
