= Roger Lemelin =

Canadian novelist, television writer, and essayist

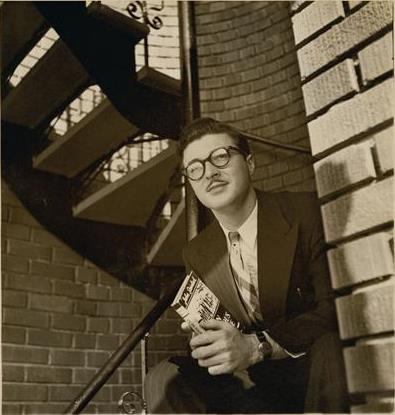
- Born: April 7, 1919; Quebec City, Quebec
- Died: March 16, 1992 (aged 72)

Roger Lemelin, CC OQ FRSC (April 7, 1919 – March 16, 1992) was a Quebec novelist, television writer, and essayist.

== Biography ==
Lemelin was born in Quebec City. From 1944 to 1952, he was a Canadian correspondent for the American magazines Time and Life and, from 1972 to 1981, he was the chief executive officer and editor of the newspaper La Presse.

In 1980, he was made a Companion of the Order of Canada. In 1989, he was made an Officer of the National Order of Quebec.

== Honours and awards ==
- Prix David (1944)
- Prize from the Académie française (1944)
- Guggenheim Fellowship
- Fellowship in the Royal Society of Canada
- Honorary doctorate from Laurentian University
- Knight of the Légion d'honneur
- Canadian corresponding membership in the Académie Goncourt
- Honorary membership in the Union des écrivains québécois

== Works ==
- Au pied de la pente douce (The Town Below), 1947
- Les Plouffe (The Plouffe Family), 1948
- Fantaisies sur les péchés capitaux, 1949
- Pierre le magnifique (In Quest of Splendour), 1952
- The Bird Fancier (L'Homme aux oiseaux), 1952
- Les Voies de l'espérance, 1979
- La Culotte en or, 1980
- Le Crime d'Ovide Plouffe, 1982
- Autopsie d'un fumeur, 1988
