= The Plouffe Family (film) =

1981 Canadian drama film by Gilles Carle

- French: Les Plouffe
- Directed by: Gilles Carle
- Written by: Gilles Carle; Jacques Vigoureux; Roger Lemelin
- Produced by: Justine Héroux; Denis Héroux (executive producer); John Kemeny (executive producer)
- Starring: Gabriel Arcand; Pierre Curzi; Juliette Huot; Émile Genest; Serge Dupire
- Cinematography: François Protat
- Edited by: Yves Langlois
- Music by: Claude Denjean; Stéphane Venne; Nicole Martin (song)
- Distributed by: Ciné 360 (Quebec); Ambassador Film Distributors (Canada)
- Release date: April 7, 1981
- Running time: 227 minutes (International version); 169 minutes (English version); 259 min (French version)
- Country: Canada
- Languages: French, English
- Budget: $4.8 million

The Plouffe Family (French: Les Plouffe) is a 1981 Canadian drama film, based on Roger Lemelin's novel about the titular Plouffe family, set during World War II. The film was Canada's submission to the Academy Award for Best Foreign Language Film in 1981, but was not shortlisted as a nominee for the award.

== Production ==
Roger Lemelin was paid $250,000 to write the script. The film was shot from 19 August to 5 December 1980, on a budget of $4.8 million (equivalent to $17,912,727 in 2025) with $250,000 coming from the SDICC.

== Release ==
The film premiered in Quebec City on 7 April 1981, and was later shown at the 1981 Cannes Film Festival. It was distributed by Ciné 360 in Quebec and by Ambassador Film Distributors in the rest of Canada.

== Reception ==
The film was seen by 191,294 people in France.

== See also ==
- La famille Plouffe, television series aired in the 1950s
- The Crime of Ovide Plouffe, 1984 film and 1986 miniseries
- List of submissions to the 54th Academy Awards for Best Foreign Language Film
- List of Canadian submissions for the Academy Award for Best Foreign Language Film

== Works cited ==
- Turner, D. John, ed. (1987). Canadian Feature Film Index: 1913-1985. Canadian Film Institute. ISBN 0660533642.
- Marshall, Bill (2001). Quebec National Cinema. McGill–Queen's University Press. ISBN 0-7735-2103-8.
