= Harvey Atkin =

Canadian actor (1942–2017)

- Born: Elliot Harvey Atkin; 18 December 1942; Toronto, Ontario, Canada
- Died: 18 July 2017 (aged 74); Toronto, Ontario, Canada
- Resting place: Pardes Shalom Cemetery, Vaughan, Ontario, Canada
- Occupation: Actor
- Years active: 1969–2017
- Spouse: Celia Tessler (m. 1963)
- Children: 2

Elliot Harvey Atkin (18 December 1942 – 18 July 2017) was a Canadian actor. He was best known for his roles as Morty Melnick in Meatballs and Sergeant Ronald Coleman in Cagney & Lacey, as well as for voicing Sam in The Adventures of Sam & Max: Freelance Police and King Koopa in all three DiC Mario series; The Super Mario Bros. Super Show!, The Adventures of Super Mario Bros. 3 and Super Mario World.

== Early life ==
Atkin was born 18 December 1942 in Toronto, Ontario to parents of Russian-Jewish descent. He developed his interest in acting while a student at Northview Heights Secondary School by performing in a high school production of Eugene O'Neill's one-act play The Rope, for which he won an award at the Simpson's Drama Festival. Atkin initially worked at his father's construction company. He then became a real estate agent, eventually transitioning to acting in commercials.

== Career ==
Atkin played Morty Melnick in the comedy film Meatballs (1979), for which performance he earned a Genie nomination.

Atkin had a role in William Fruet's horror film Funeral Home (1980), as well as the role of Sam in The Adventures of Sam & Max: Freelance Police, and also played Mario's and Luigi's archenemy King Koopa on DiC Entertainment's cartoon version of Super Mario Bros. (notably, he was the first English voice actor for the character). Playing Koopa in all three Mario animated series, he was one of the only voice actors to appear in all three series as the same character.

In 1977 he appeared as Talbot, an inept police officer, in an episode of the British television series The New Avengers, the first of four episodes to be set and filmed in Canada. He voiced Mr. Mushnik on Little Shop, loosely based on the movie Little Shop of Horrors. He also played characters in other series such as Beetlejuice, Bad Dog and Ruby Gloom. Atkin appeared in more than 75 films and on many television series. He did voice-over work in approximately 3,000 television and radio commercials, notably for the Leon's Furniture chain, for which he won three Clio Awards.

He appeared in 95 episodes of Cagney & Lacey as Sergeant Ronald Coleman. Atkin played Judge Alan Ridenour in a recurring role on the television drama Law & Order: Special Victims Unit, a role he also played in Law & Order: Criminal Intent and Law & Order, and was the voice-over in Leon's and "Buy Israel Bonds" commercials in Canada. He also made a cameo playing a bus driver in the classic film Atlantic City (1980) starring Burt Lancaster, and was the voice for Morty in the television series Jacob Two-Two. He made a guest appearance in 2010 as a rabbi on the CBC Television series 18 to Life.

== Personal life ==
Atkin married Celia Tessler in 1963. Together they had two children, and went on to become grandparents to five.

== Death ==
Atkin died of a brain tumor on 18 July 2017 in Toronto, Ontario, at the age of 74.

=== Legacy ===
A re-animated version of the Super Mario World episode "Mama Luigi", commissioned and directed by animation artist Andrew Dickman within a year with over 227 animators and artists participating, was dedicated to Atkin alongside Tony Rosato (Luigi), who died earlier that year on 10 January. The video was released on 29 August 2017.

== Filmography ==
Film performances
Year	Title	Role	Notes
1976	Silver Streak	Conventioneer	
1977	The War Between the Tates	Dr. Bernard M. Kotelchuk	Television film
1978	High-Ballin'	Buzz	
1978	Power Play	Anwar	
1979	Meatballs	Morty Melnick	
1980	Atlantic City	Bus Driver	
1980	Funeral Home	Harry Browning	
1981	The Incubus	Joe Prescott	
1981	Improper Channels	Sergeant	
1981	The Last Chase	Jud	
1981	Heavy Metal	Alien / Henchman	Voice
1981	Ticket to Heaven	Mr. Stone	
1982	If You Could See What I Hear	Bert	
1982	Rubberface		
1982	Visiting Hours	Vinnie Bradshaw	
1983	All in Good Taste		
1984	Finders Keepers		
1985	Carried Away		Voice
1985	Joshua Then and Now	Dr. Jonathan Cole	
1986	Separate Vacations	Henry Gilbert	
1986	Every Dog's Guide to Complete Home Safety	Bernard	Voice
1987	Mr. Nice Guy	Jerry Reeman	
1989	Speed Zone	Gus Gold	
1989	Mindfield		
1989	Eddie and the Cruisers II: Eddie Lives!	Lew Eisen	
1991	Snake Eater II: The Drug Buster		
1991	The Lump		Voice
1991	Every Dog's Guide to the Playground	Bernard	Voice
1991	The Apprentice (L'Apprenti)		Voice
1992	Terror on Track 9		Television film
1993	Guilty as Sin	Judge Steinberg	
1994	Seasons of the Heart		Television film
1994	Janek: The Silent Betrayal	Medical Examiner	Television film
1995	Between Love and Honor		Television film
1995	Family of Cops	Avrum Weiss	Television film
1996	The Stupids	Deli Guy	
1996	Radiant City		Television film
1996	Rebound: The Legend of Earl "The Goat" Manigault		Television film
1997	Love and Death on Long Island	Lou	
1997	Critical Care	Judge Fatale	
1998	One Tough Cop	Rudy	
1998	Joe's Wedding		
2000	Out of Sync	Sidney Golden	Television film
2001	Club Land	Morty	Television film
2006	Why I Wore Lipstick to My Mastectomy		Television film
2010	Barney's Version	Second father in-law	
2011	The Seder	Arik	
2013	Let’s Rap	Neighbor	Short film
2014	Bastards	Uncle Lem	Short film
2015	Trailer Dangerous Lessons	Principle Winters	Television film
2017	A Change of Heart	Cardiologist	
2017	Progress (and Unrelated Things)	Max	Final role

Television series performances
Year	Title	Role	Notes
1975	Down Home Country	Chuck Wagon	
1977–1980	King of Kensington	Various	4 episodes
1979–1985	The Littlest Hobo	Various	
1981–1988	Cagney & Lacey	Sergeant Ronald Coleman	95 episodes
1982	Claim to Fame		
1986	Every Dog's Guide to Complete Home Safety	Bernard	
1986–1993	Under the Umbrella Tree	The Great Goldberg	
1987–1989	ALF: The Animated Series	Additional voices	13 episodes
1988–1989	AlfTales	Additional voices	
1988	Robocop: The Animated Series	K.R.U.D. TV station manager, Zokastani sheik	Episodes "No News Is Good News" and "A Robot's Revenge" (uncredited)
1989	The Super Mario Bros. Super Show!	King Koopa, Tryclyde, Koopa Troopas, Sergeant Kooperman, others	52 episodes
1989–1991	Beetlejuice	Lipscum, Exorcist	
1990	Piggsburg Pigs!	Additional voices	
1990	The Adventures of Super Mario Bros. 3	King Koopa	26 episodes
1991	Swamp Thing	Tomahawk	Recurring role
1991	Little Shop	Mushnick	13 episodes
1991	Wish Kid	Additional Voices	13 episodes
1991	Super Mario World	King Koopa	12 episodes
1991–1994	Hello Kitty and Friends	Guala, Mr. Jones, William	3 episodes
1992	Stunt Dawgs	Badyear, Half-A-Mind	
1992	The Adventures of Tintin	Additional voices	13 episodes
1993	X-Men	Sasquatch, Dr. Walter Langkowski	
1993–1994	Keroppi and Friends	Mary and Johnny's Father, King Richard	2 episodes
1994	Tales from the Cryptkeeper	Uncle Harry, Harold Klump	2 episodes
1995	Sailor Moon	Pox, Bumboo	2 episodes
1995	The Neverending Story	Mr. Rockchewer	2 episodes
1996	Goosebumps	Mr. Malik	Episode: "Bad Hare Day"
1997–1998	The Adventures of Sam & Max: Freelance Police	Sam	13 episodes
1998–2000	Bad Dog	Mr. Potanski	
1998–2001	Bob and Margaret	Additional voices	
2000–2009	Law & Order: Special Victims Unit	Judge Alan Ridenour	18 episodes
2001–2002	The Ripping Friends	Crag, The Indigestible Wad, Cereal CEO, Pungent Puss Husband, Dad #1 Santa, Fish	5 episodes
2003	Jacob Two-Two	Morty	5 episodes
2003	Braceface	Mr. Stone	Episode: "Ms. Spitz Goes to Warsch and Stone"
2005	Time Warp Trio	Beaner, Journalist	
2006	Sons of Butcher		2 episodes
2006–2007	Ruby Gloom	Mr. White	5 episodes
2006–2008	6teen	George Bickerson	3 episodes
2011	Producing Parker	Judge	Episode: "In Dee Block"
2011–2013	Scaredy Squirrel	Additional voices	7 episodes
