= Alf Humphreys =

Canadian actor (1953–2018)

- Born: Alfred E. Humphreys; August 9, 1953; Haileybury, Ontario, Canada
- Died: January 31, 2018 (aged 64); Stratford, Ontario, Canada
- Other names: Alfred E. Humphries, Alfred Humphries, Alfred Humphreys
- Occupation: Actor
- Years active: 1980–2012
- Spouse: Elizabeth Moss
- Children: 3

Alfred E. Humphreys (August 9, 1953 – January 31, 2018) was a Canadian actor.

== Early life ==
Alfred Humphreys was born in Haileybury, Ontario, Canada. He was the son of Leslie and Gabrielle Humphreys.

== Career ==
Humphreys was a dramatic actor who first acted on stage with a troupe in North Bay, Ontario. His breakthrough role was as the Deputy Lester in First Blood (1982), which starred Sylvester Stallone as Rambo. His other memorable roles include the character Howard Landers in My Bloody Valentine (1981) and William Drake in the blockbuster film X2 (2003). He also starred in two horror films directed by William Fruet: Funeral Home (1980) and Bedroom Eyes (1984). He also played supporting parts in such films as Act of Vengeance (1986), Ernest Rides Again (1993), Luna: Spirit of the Whale (2007) and Air Bud: Spikes Back (2003). In 2010, he appeared in Diary of a Wimpy Kid as Robert Jefferson, a role he would reprise in the film's sequels Diary of a Wimpy Kid: Rodrick Rules (2011), Diary of a Wimpy Kid: Dog Days (2012) and the short film Class Clown (2012).

Humphreys played numerous small guest roles in television shows throughout the 1980s up to the 2000s, including the role of Dr. Pomerantz on the Sci-Fi show The X Files, as well as roles on The Twilight Zone (the 1985 and 2002 revivals), Smallville, Outer Limits and Da Vinci's Inquest.

== Personal life ==
Humphreys was married to Elizabeth Moss. They had one son (Kess) and two daughters (Kirastyn and Ainsley) from Moss's previous marriage.

== Death ==
Humphreys died of brain cancer on January 31, 2018, in Stratford, Ontario, Canada. He was 64.

== Selected filmography ==
- Virus (1980) – Sailor #2 – HMS Nereid
- Funeral Home (1980) – Joe Yates
- My Bloody Valentine (1981) – Howard Landers
- Improper Channels (1981) – Orderly #2
- Gas (1981) – Lou Picard
- If You Could See What I Hear (1982) – Freddy
- First Blood (1982) – Deputy Lester
- Finders Keepers (1984) – Mulholland
- Bedroom Eyes (1984) – Cantrell
- Honeymoon (1985) – Sonny
- Love and Larceny (1985) – Ralph Dugot
- One Magic Christmas (1985)
- Flying (1986) – Joel
- Ernest Rides Again (1993) – Surgeon
- The Raffle (1994) – Randy Hickock
- Rumble in the Bronx (1995) – Police Officer
- Falling from the Sky: Flight 174 (1995, television movie) – Cabbie
- Big Bully (1996) – Teacher #2
- Silence (1997)
- Indefensible: The Truth About Edward Brannigan (1997, television movie) – Father Lomax
- National Lampoon's Golf Punks (1998) – Jack
- The Stickup (2002) – Mike O'Grady
- Dead Heat (2002) – Dr. Marchesi
- Final Destination 2 (2003) – Mr. Gibbons
- X2 (2003) – William Drake
- Little Brother of War (2003) – Phil
- The Perfect Score (2004) – Tom Helton
- John Tucker Must Die (2006) – Detention Teacher
- The Suspect (2006) – Robert Owens
- Deck the Halls (2006) – Hardware Store Employee
- The Uninvited (2009) – Priest
- Diary of a Wimpy Kid (2010) – Mr. Jefferson
- Diary of a Wimpy Kid: Rodrick Rules (2011) – Mr. Jefferson
- Diary of a Wimpy Kid: Dog Days (2012) – Mr. Jefferson (final film role)
