= Lesleh Donaldson =

Canadian actress

- Born: April 7, 1964 (age 62); Toronto, Ontario, Canada
- Occupation: Actress
- Years active: 1979–present

Lesleh Donaldson (born April 7, 1964) is a Canadian actress who has worked in stage and film. After making her film debut in the drama Running (1979), she would appear in several horror films in the early 1980s, which earned her the title of "scream queen" among genre fans. These films include: Funeral Home (1980), Happy Birthday to Me (1981), Curtains (1983), and Deadly Eyes (1982). She also had a featured guest appearance on the Friday the 13th: The Series (1987).

== Early life ==
Donaldson was born in Toronto, Ontario. As a child, she studied at the Royal Conservatory of Music in Canada and appeared in early television commercials for Ford automobiles, as well as print ads for Sears. Donaldson's father was a professional operatic tenor.

== Career ==
In the late 1970s, she appeared in several made-for-television movies including On My Own about a teenager suffering from epilepsy.

Her first theatrical film appearance was in Running (1979) starring Michael Douglas. She then starred in a number of theatrically released horror movies, including William Fruet's Funeral Home (also known as Cries in the Night) (1980), J. Lee Thompson's Happy Birthday to Me (1981), Deadly Eyes (1982) and Curtains (1983).

In 1982 Lesleh was nominated for the Best Performance by an Actress in a Leading Role Genie Award for her performance in Funeral Home. She also appeared in an episode of the television horror series Friday the 13th: The Series.

== Filmography ==
=== Movies ===
Year	Title	Role	Notes
1979	Running	Andrea Andropolis	
1980	Funeral Home	Heather	
1981	Happy Birthday to Me	Bernadette O'Hara	
1982	Deadly Eyes	Martha	
1983	Thanks for the Ride		Short
1983	Curtains	Christie Burns	
1987	Hearts of Fire	Penny	
1992	Hurt Penguins	Norma	
1994	You Love Me I Hate You	Mother	Short
2010	What the F*ck Doug E. Doug?	Woman in park	
2011	Octoberfeast	Heather	Video
2014	Fall to Rise	Melanie	
2014	The Night Before Easter	Janice Sykes	
2014	Tales of Poe	Evelyn Dyck / Woman in black	
2014	In the Future Love Will Also	Multiple (Voice)	Short
2014	Behind Bars	Nancy	Short
2017	Swamp Freak	Professor Belinda Southworth	Voice Role
2017	Witness Protection	Eleanor	Television film
2018	Abnormal Attraction	Anne	
2018	A Simple Favor	Bus Tourist	

=== Television ===
Year	Title	Role	Notes
1979	Hot Wheels		TV Short
1983	The Littlest Hobo	Natalie Wilson	1 Episode, Second Sight
1984	Special People	Robin	TV movie
1985	The Undergrads	Kim Barrett	TV movie
1985	Star Wars: Droids	Kea Moll	13 episodes
1986	Adderly	Dale	1 Episode, Brotherly Love
1986	Ewoks		13 episodes
1987	Friday the 13th: The Series	Lyla	1 Episode, The Great Montarro
1988	Night Heat	Janet Crossleigh	1 Episode, Woof
1988	Chasing Rainbows		TV mini-series
1994	Street Legal	Carol Murphy	1 Episode, The Firm
2011	Joe Zaso's Cafe Himbo	Guest Star	
2015	High Falls	Lulu	3 episodes
2018	The Handmaid's Tale	Neighbouring Martha #2	1 Episode, The Word
2019	Jett	Sweeney's Sister	1 Episode, "Frank Sweeney"

== Stage credits ==
Title	Venue
The Diary of Anne Frank	Manitoba Theatre Centre
Criminals in Love	The Factory Theatre
The Moundbuilders	Equity Showcase Theatre
You Can't Take It With You	Manitoba Theatre Centre
Burn This	Manitoba Theatre Centre
How Could You, Mrs. Dick	Winter Garden & Tivoli
Wonderful Tennessee	Sanford Meisner Theatre
