= Sherry Willis-Burch =

American actress

Sherry Willis-Burch (born February 15, 1957) is an American actress who had a brief career in the 1980s, starring in the horror films Final Exam (1981) and Killer Party (1986).

== History ==
Sherry was born and raised in Dallas, Texas. Her only two film credits are major roles in the horror film Final Exam (1981) as Janet McArdle and the lead in William Fruet's Killer Party (1986) as Vivia. She was also set to appear in the film The Last Prom, although this project was later scrapped.

She received the part of Janet McArdle in Final Exam when, while working for the films production company MPM, the producers saw her in a play.

Sherry disappeared from the industry after Killer Party (1986), but she reappeared for an interview and commentary on both DVD releases of Final Exam (1981), where she stated, "for someone who doesn't like slasher flicks, I made two"! Following her film appearances, Sherry began a career as a schoolteacher in Los Angeles.

Sherry portrayed Cass in the stage production of The Real Queen Of Hearts Ain't Even Pretty at The Actors Playhouse in Los Angeles, in the fall of 1983, as well as other local productions, including for the Hermosa Beach Community Theatre.
