= Killer Party =

- Theatrical release poster
- Directed by: William Fruet
- Written by: Barney Cohen
- Produced by: Michael Lepiner
- Starring: Martin Hewitt; Ralph Seymour; Elaine Wilkes; Paul Bartel; Joanna Johnson
- Cinematography: John Lindley
- Edited by: Eric Albertson
- Music by: John Beal
- Production companies: Polar Entertainment; Telecom Entertainment; Marquis Productions
- Distributed by: Metro-Goldwyn-Mayer
- Release date: May 9, 1986
- Running time: 91 minutes
- Countries: United States; Canada
- Language: English
- Box office: $457,026

Killer Party is a 1986 supernatural slasher film directed by William Fruet, and starring Martin Hewitt, Ralph Seymour, Elaine Wilkes, Joanna Johnson, Sherry Willis-Burch, and Paul Bartel. It follows a trio of female sorority pledges who unleash a demonic force after participating in an initiation ritual in an abandoned house on their university's campus.

Released in May 1986, it was the last film in the original library of Metro-Goldwyn-Mayer (MGM) titles dating back to 1924, following the studio's sale from Kirk Kerkorian to Ted Turner the same month. While it received little critical notice at the time of its release, garnerning negative reviews and flopping commercially, the film has gone on to accrue a small cult following, though reception has remained divided.

== Plot ==
The film opens with a priest presiding over a funeral for Annabelle Fitzwilliam Carslow attended by four relatives in mourning. After the procession, her daughter-in-law Stephanie asks the priest if she can stay behind to say a few words to the deceased; she is dragged against her will into the casket upon announcing she hopes her mother-in-law will rot in hell. The events are revealed to be part of a film showing at a drive in, where a girl is menaced by a zombie. This in turn is part of a music video being watched by the protagonist.

College students Vivia, Jennifer, and Phoebe decide to pledge a sorority at their university, Briggs College. During hell week, the sorority's housemother, Mrs. Henshaw, urges the women not to hold their initiation rituals at Pratt House, an abandoned fraternity nearby. Mrs. Henshaw goes to Pratt House and, in an overgrown garden outside, visits the tombstone for a man named Allan. She implores that, should the students enter the house, that Allan leave them alone. Upon going inside, Mrs. Henshaw is bludgeoned to death by an unseen assailant.

The day of the initiation, Vivia, Jennifer, and Phoebe break in to a boys' fraternity to steal clothing as part of their hazing ritual. Inside, Jennifer is confronted by Blake, who swiftly takes romantic interest in her. Back at her dorm, Jennifer is met by her shy and nerdy classmate Martin, who returns a book she dropped outside. That night, the women arrive at Pratt House for their hazing ceremony. During the hazing, which includes the women be forced to hold raw eggs in their mouths, the lights begin to flicker, and the group are terrified when glasses begin flying off a table by themselves. Vivia goes downstairs to investigate noises, and when the women follow, they find her bound to a guillotine and watch her be beheaded. Vivia suddenly emerges from the shadows and picks up the severed head, revealing the entire scenario to be an elaborate prank using a dummy.

The following morning, Martin gives the women a ride to the sorority to receive news of their acceptances or rejections. All three are selected, though Vivia learns that her prank was the only reason for her acceptance. Veronica, the mean sorority's leading member, demands Vivia recreate the prank during an upcoming April Fool's Day masquerade party at Pratt House. At a committee meeting for the university's Greek society, Professor Zito recalls the hazing ritual 22 years ago that resulted in Allan's death by a guillotine. That afternoon, Jennifer, Phoebe, and Vivia set up the prank in Pratt House, and Jennifer tells them she did research showing that Allan was involved in the occult and had conjured evil; she also cites news articles about people going missing in the house, never to be found. Later, Professor Zito inspects the house, and is electrocuted by an assailant in the basement.

At the party that night, Vivia's prank is hatched during Veronica's toast, and Jennifer is dragged into the basement by a hidden cord while the partygoers watch in horror. In the basement, Jennifer and Vivia laugh and quickly prepare Vivia's guillotine stunt, when Jennifer is suddenly overcome and possessed by a spirit. She returns upstairs in silence, and worriedly tells Blake she needs to leave. Vivia follows, aborting the guillotine stunt. As the party filters out, Pam, a sorority sister, is killed with a trident by someone dressed in a diving suit. The same assailant beats Veronica to death with a hammer before using the guillotine to kill Albert, Phoebe's love interest. Blake is subsequently lured into a bathroom. Numerous partygoers are dispatched in swift succession, and Vivia discovers the dismembered body of a delivery boy named Virgil in the refrigerator.

Vivia flees upstairs to retrieve Phoebe, and the two find Blake's drowned corpse in the bathtub, and then they find the bodies of other victims. They are subsequently confronted by Jennifer, who reveals herself to be possessed by Allan. Jennifer pursues them with the trident, causing the stairs to collapse as they climb them. They attempt to escape through an upstairs window, but Jennifer throws Vivia to the ground, breaking her legs, before propelling after her. Phoebe climbs down the wall and begins beating Jennifer with a broken board before impaling her through the chest, killing her. Phoebe consoles Vivia, but it is soon apparent that she has been overtaken by Allan's spirit. Police arrive and whisk the two women away together in an ambulance, as Vivia pleads not to be left alone with the possessed Phoebe, who smiles maliciously at her. The ambulance drives away in the night, while Vivia still screams.

== Cast ==
- Martin Hewitt as Blake
- Ralph Seymour as Martin
- Elaine Wilkes as Phoebe
- Joanna Johnson as Jennifer Beatty
- Paul Bartel as Professor Zito
- Sherry Willis-Burch as Vivia
- Alicia Fleer as Veronica
- Woody Brown as Albert Harrison
- Terri Hawkes as Melanie
- Deborah Hancock as Pam
- Laura Sherman as Sandy
- Jeff Pustil as Virgil
- Pam Hyatt as Mrs. Henshaw
- Danielle Kiraly as April
- Elizabeth Hanna as Stephanie
- Denise Ferguson as Dr. Bain
- Dora Dainton as Kosima

== Production ==
The screenplay for Killer Party was written by Barney Cohen, who had recently completed the screenplay for Friday the 13th: The Final Chapter (1984). The film had the working titles of Fool's Night and April Fool, but was ultimately changed to Killer Party when Paramount Pictures announced their own horror film called April Fool's Day slated to release in March.

Actress Sherry Willis-Burch revealed in an interview that her character Vivia was initially meant to be killed early in the film when she first was given the role, but was rewritten to survive until the very end.

Principal photography took place in Toronto, Ontario, beginning in the fall of 1984.

== Release ==
Killer Party was released theatrically through Metro-Goldwyn-Mayer on May 9, 1986, and grossed $457,026.

=== Home media ===
Key Video released Killer Party on VHS on October 29, 1986. In 2012, the Warner Archive Collection released the film on DVD-R. Scream Factory released Killer Party on Blu-ray on October 26, 2021.

== Reception ==
=== Box office ===
Killer Party grossed $457,026. It was the last film in the original Metro-Goldwyn-Mayer library (which dates back to 1924) following the studio's sale from Kirk Kerkorian to Ted Turner the same month.

=== Critical response ===
Rick Bentley of The Town Talk deemed the film a "slash above" its peers, adding: "The film is surprisingly well done (for this type of production) and proves the "slasher" films can be done with a degree of quality". Michael Price of the Fort Worth Star-Telegram panned the film as "a sorry waste of John Lindley's impressive camerawork, of players whose abilities range from competence to excellence, and of a disciplined and even sporadically tasteful job of directing from William Fruet". Critic Joe Bob Briggs gave the film a slight recommendation based on its excessive number of murders, but deemed its supernatural elements redolent of The Exorcist (1973) and Poltergeist (1982). Roger Hurlburt of the South Florida Sun-Sentinel gave the film a one-star out of four-star rating, deeming it a "discount offering... Killer Party fails on every count".

Donald Guarisco of AllMovie wrote: "This late straggler in the slasher-movie cycle of the early 1980s is a "neither fish nor fowl" exercise in frustration". In his 2002 book, Going to Pieces: The Rise and Fall of the Slasher Film, 1978-1986, writer Adam Rockoff notes that Killer Party lacks the "vile brilliance" of his 1976 feature, The House by the Lake, though he conceded that it was superior to most of the slasher films of the same period.

The Online Film Critics Society's David Nusair panned the film in a 2017 review, referring to it as a "bottom-of-the-barrel slasher... By the time the actual horror stuff finally rolls around – the majority of which is far too silly and Exorcist-like to make a positive impact - Killer Party has certainly cemented its place as a thoroughly misbegotten disaster that’s best forgotten". The Film Society of Lincoln Center heralded the film as an overlooked entry in the slasher subgenre, overshadowed by the similarly themed film April Fool's Day, released the same year.

== Sources ==
- Bingen, Steven (2022). The MGM Effect: How a Hollywood Studio Changed the World. London, England: Lyons Press. ISBN 978-1-493-06796-1.
- Harper, Jim (2004). Legacy of Blood: A Comprehensive Guide to Slasher Movies. Manchester, England: Critical Vision. ISBN 978-1-900-48639-2.
- Magistrale, Tony (2005). Abject Terrors: Surveying the Modern and Postmodern Horror Film. New York City, New York: Peter Lang. ISBN 978-0-820-47056-6.
- Rockoff, Adam (2016) [2002]. Going to Pieces: The Rise and Fall of the Slasher Film, 1978–1986. Jefferson, North Carolina: McFarland. ISBN 978-0-786-49192-6.
