= Periyar and the Indian National Congress =

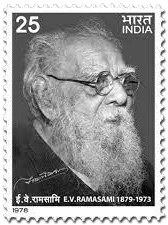
E V Ramasami

Periyar E. V. Ramasamy (17 September 1879 – 24 December 1973), also known as Ramaswami, EVR, Thanthai Periyar, or Periyar, was a Dravidian social reformer and politician from India, who founded the Self-Respect Movement and Dravidar Kazhagam. In 1919 Periyar Ramaswamy joined the Indian National Congress after quitting his business and resigning from public posts. He was the chairman of Erode Municipality and undertook Constructive Programs spreading the use of Khadi, picketing toddy shops, boycotting shops selling foreign cloth, and eradicating untouchability. In 1921, Periyar was imprisoned for picketing toddy shops in Erode. When his wife as well as his sister joined the agitation, it gained momentum, and the administration was forced to come to a compromise. He was again arrested during the Non-Cooperation movement and the Temperance movement. In 1922, Periyar was elected the President of the Madras Presidency Congress Committee during the Tirupur session where he advocated strongly for reservation in government jobs and education. His attempts were defeated in the Congress party due to a strong presence of discrimination and indifference. He later quit the party on those grounds in 1925.

== Gurukulam Incident ==
Even before he resigned from membership of the Congress, Periyar was convinced that communalism was deep-rooted in Tamil Nadu and that the forward community members of the Congress showed only lip service for backward classes. When Mohandas Karamchand Gandhi started the Non-Cooperation Movement in 1920, he suggested that Congressmen should avoid sending their children to schools which were under the supervision of the British rulers. There were also new schools started by individuals and charitable institutions, for the benefit of the children who were not going to Government schools.

In a place called Cheranmadevi in Tirunelveli district, a residential school, also known as Gurukulam, was started with help from the Tamil Nadu Congress. It was manned by V.V.S. Iyer who was believed to be an ardent Congressman. The Tamil Nadu Congress was given an annual grant of ten thousand rupees to the school. For the year 1925, half of the grant for the school had already been given by the time Periyar became the secretary. On receipt of complaint, Periyar found that Brahmin children and Non-Brahmin children were given food in separate places. He advised Iyer to treat children alike and not instill communalism into them by putting them into separate groups. Iyer refused to listen to Periyar's advice, upon which the latter refused to release the other half of the grant. Iyer then managed to get the amount from the joint secretary of the Congress, without the knowledge of Periyar. When this came to the attention of Periyar, he addressed public meetings about it and created public awareness of what was happening in Gurukulam. Prominent congressmen like Dr. Varadarajulu Naidu, Thiru V.Ka, S. Ramanathan and others condemned the sectarian attitude of Iyer in running a public institution. When Gandhi's attention was drawn to what was happening in the school, he too did not succeed in the matter. Iyer was reluctant to change his attitude and therefore the school was closed.

== Reasons for leaving ==
Periyar was initially an enthusiastic supporter of Non-Cooperation movement but left the Congress in 1925 as he believed that the Congress was neither able nor willing to provide importance to the concerns of non-Brahmins. He was particularly angered by Gandhi's pro-Brahman speeches in Madras during his trip in 1927.

When Periyar joined the Congress in 1919, he believed that the prominent people in that organisation were enlightened and hoped that with their co-operation, he could get rid of the practice of untouchability. Furthermore, Periyar believed that people of the backward and depressed classes could be enabled to have proper education and have their proper share in government appointments through the help of the Congress Party. Periyar unsuccessfully tried to pass a resolution regarding communal representation five times. Soon after his return from Vaikom, Periyar made the last and sixth attempt at getting the Tamil Nadu Congress to pass the resolution regarding communal representation at a conference held in Kanchipuram in 1925. Thiru V.Ka was the President at the time and sensing opposition in the open session, he did not permit Periyar to propose the resolution. In utter disgust, Periyar left the Congress.

So by the time Periyar resigned from the Congress, he knew that to enable the backward community people to come up, they must be made to realise that they had the right to claim equality with the so-called upper classes, and that, in fact, they had the right to claim proportionate representation in public offices. Thus, some of these themes constituted the platform of his future work. It should be said to the credit of Periyar that his repeated public meetings on the question of communal representation forced the government to pass G.O.No.1129 on 15 December 1928 by which Brahmins, non-Brahmins, Christians, Muslims and depressed classes were assured of proportionate representation in public offices.

Periyar felt that the Brahmins, who formed a majority in the Indian National Congress and occupied the high posts, desired to dominate the party. Periyar was against the activities of the Brahmin leadership, which he felt, conspired to secure the high posts in the party for themselves and members of their community As soon as Periyar joined the Indian National Congress, he tried to introduce the usage of khadi. However, he soon got the impression that the Khadi Board Administration was dominated by Brahmins. The affairs of this Board also convinced Periyar that to get justice done to non-Brahmins in Tamil Nadu, he must leave the Congress and work from outside.

He was disgusted by the attitude of Congress leaders when he found that at a feast organised by nationalists, seating arrangement followed caste distinctions - lower castes were castes made to sit separately from the upper castes.
