= Pride =

Positive effect from the perceived value of a person

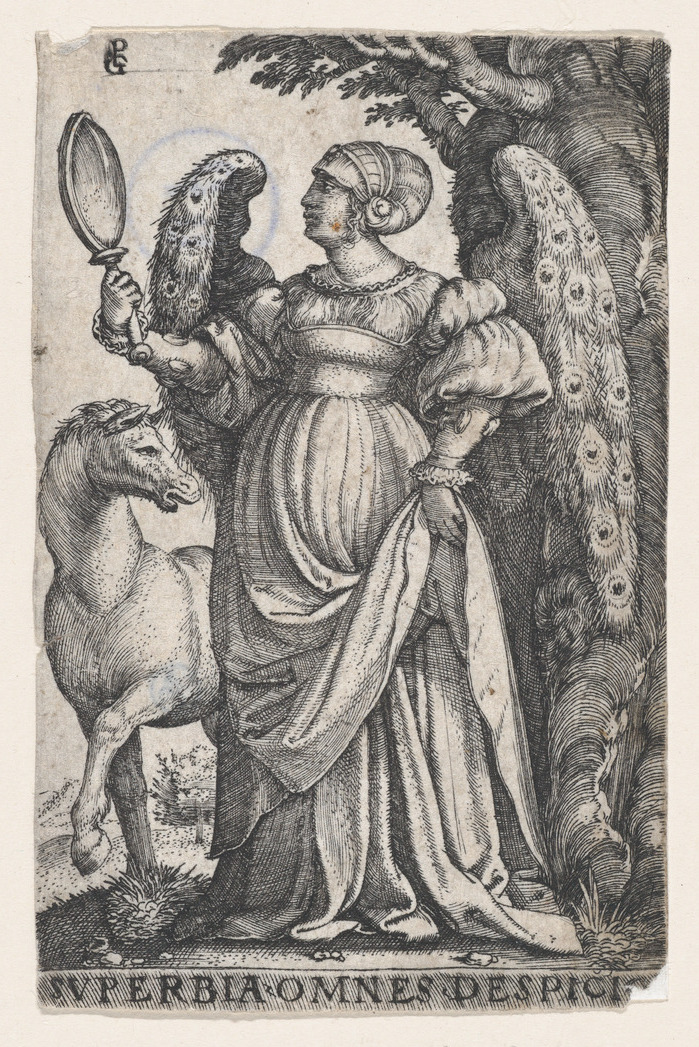
16th-century print by Georg Pencz, depicting pride as one of the seven vices

Pride is an emotion characterized by a sense of security with one's identity, performance, and/or accomplishments. Depending on the context, pride may be viewed as either a virtue or a vice. Typically, pride arises from praise, independent self-reflection, or a fulfilled feeling of belonging.

When viewed as a virtue, pride refers to a reasonable sense of one's worth, accomplishments and belonging. In this sense it is defined as synonymous with confidence, self-respect or magnanimity, and as the opposite of shame. It may encompass a sense of patriotism, national identity, regional identity, or other affiliations (e.g. proud to be a university alumnus). It can also be used by members of marginalized groups to signal a celebration of their unique cultural identity, such as in Black pride, Mad pride, or especially LGBTQ Pride movements.

When depicted as a vice, pride may also be used to refer to foolhardiness, or an unearned, irrational sense of one's personal value, status, or accomplishments. Negative definitions of pride are synonymous with arrogance, vanity or hubris, and as the opposite of humility. It is in this sense that pride is interpreted in various theologies as one of the seven deadly sins. Despite their differences, the positive and negative definitions of pride share a nonverbal expression and evolutionary function.

== Etymology ==
The word proud originated from the late Old English word prud, or prute, likely derived from the Old French word meaning 'brave' or 'valiant' (11th century). This term ultimately comes from the Late Latin prode, meaning 'useful'. The sense of "having a high opinion of oneself", which does not exist in French, may reflect the Anglo-Saxons' perception of the Norman knights, who referred to themselves as "proud".

== Ancient Greek philosophy ==
Aristotle identified pride (megalopsuchia, variously translated as 'proper pride', 'the greatness of soul', 'high-mindedness' and 'magnanimity') as the crown of the virtues, distinguishing it from vanity, temperance and humility, saying:

"By a high-minded man we seem to mean one who claims much and deserves much: for he who claims much without deserving it is a fool; but the possessor of a virtue is never foolish or silly. The man we have described, then, is high-minded. He who deserves little and claims little is temperate [or modest], but not high-minded: for high-mindedness [or greatness of soul] implies greatness, just as beauty implies stature; small men may be neat and well proportioned, but cannot be called beautiful."

He then concludes that:

"High-mindedness, then, seems to be the crowning grace, as it were, of the virtues; it makes them greater, and cannot exist without them. And on this account it is a hard thing to be truly high-minded; for it is impossible without the union of all the virtues."

By contrast, Aristotle defined the vice of hubris as follows:

"... to cause shame to the victim, not in order that anything may happen to you, nor because anything has happened to you, but merely for your own gratification. Hubris is not the requital of past injuries; this is revenge. As for the pleasure in hubris, its cause is this: naive men think that by ill-treating others they make their own superiority the greater."

While pride and hubris are often deemed the same thing in modern contexts, for Aristotle and many other Ancient Greek philosophers, hubris was a more extreme, excessive pride that led to downfall, and is an entirely different thing from pride.

"Such, then, is the proud man; the man who falls short of him is unduly humble, and the man who goes beyond him is vain."

== Psychology ==
=== Emotion ===
In psychological terms, positive pride is a "pleasant, sometimes exhilarating, emotion that results from a positive self-evaluation". It was added to the University of California, Davis, "Set of Emotion Expressions", as one of three "self-conscious" emotions known to have recognizable expressions (along with embarrassment and shame).

The term "fiero" was coined by Italian psychologist Isabella Poggi to describe the pride experienced and expressed in the moments following a personal triumph over adversity. Facial expressions and gestures that demonstrate pride can involve a lifting of the chin, smiles, or arms on hips to demonstrate victory or achievement. Individuals may implicitly grant status to others based solely on their expressions of pride, even in cases in which they wish to avoid doing so. Indeed, some studies indicate that the nonverbal expression of pride conveys a message that is automatically perceived by others about a person's high social status in a group.

Behaviorally, pride can also be expressed by adopting an expanded posture in which the head is tilted back and the arms extended out from the body. This postural display is innate, as it is shown in congenitally blind individuals who have lacked the opportunity to see it in others.

=== Authentic and Hubristic pride ===
Contemporary psychological research distinguishes between two facets of pride: authentic pride and hubristic pride. Authentic pride is associated with feelings of accomplishment, confidence, and productive effort, and is positively correlated with self-esteem and prosocial behavior. Hubristic pride, by contrast, is associated with arrogance and inflated self-views, and has been linked to narcissism and interpersonal difficulties.

Subsequent research has examined the evolutionary and social functions of pride, suggesting that pride may function as a status-regulating emotion that signals competence and social value within groups.

=== Positive outcomes ===
Pride results from self-directed satisfaction with meeting personal goals; for example, positive performance outcomes elicit pride in a person when the event is appraised as having been caused by that person alone.

Pride functions as a display of the strong self that promotes feelings of similarity to strong peers, as well as differentiation from weak others. Seen in this light, pride can be conceptualized as a hierarchy-enhancing emotion, as its experience and display helps rid negotiations of conflict.

Pride involves exhilarated pleasure and a feeling of accomplishment. It is related to "more positive behaviors and outcomes in the area where the individual is proud". Pride is associated with positive social behaviors such as helping others and public expression of achievement. Along with hope, it is an emotion that facilitates goal attainment, as it can help trigger and sustain focused efforts, helping individuals prepare for upcoming evaluative events. It may also help enhance the quality and flexibility of the effort expended. Pride can enhance creativity, productivity, and altruism.

One study from the University of Michigan found that among African-American youth, pride is associated with a higher GPA in less socioeconomically advantaged neighborhoods, whereas in more advantaged neighborhoods, pride is associated with a lower GPA.

=== Economics ===
In the field of economic psychology, pride is conceptualized on a spectrum ranging from "proper pride", associated with genuine achievements, and "false pride", which can be maladaptive or even pathological. S.E.G. Lea and P. Webly, the researchers of the journal 'Pride in economic psychology', examined the role of pride in various economic situations. They claimed that pride is involved in all economic decisions because those decisions are linked to the self of the person who makes them. Understood in this way, pride is an emotional state that works to ensure that people take financial decisions that are in their long-term interests, even when in the short term they would appear irrational.

=== Sin and self-acceptance ===
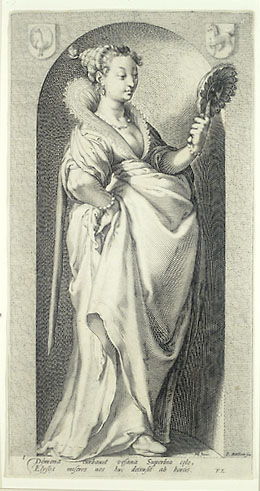
Pride, from the Seven Deadly Sins by Jacob Matham c. 1592

Inordinate self-esteem is called "pride". Classical Christian theology viewed pride as a consequence of high self-esteem, and therefore considered high self-esteem itself to be the root of the primary human problem. However, beginning in the 20th century, "humanistic psychology" diagnosed the primary human problem as low self-esteem stemming from a lack of belief in one's "true worth". Carl Rogers observed that most people "regard themselves as worthless and unlovable". Thus, they lack self-esteem.

In the King James Bible, people exhibiting excess pride are labeled with the term "haughty".

Pride goeth before destruction, and an haughty spirit before a fall.

— King James Version of the Bible (1611), Book of Proverbs, 16:18

In his book Mere Christianity, C.S. Lewis calls pride "the great sin", arguing that "it is Pride which has been the chief cause of misery in every nation and every family since the world began."

Terry Cooper describes excessive pride (along with low self-esteem) as an important framework in which to describe the human condition. He examines and compares the Augustinian-Niebuhrian conviction that pride is primary, the feminist concept of pride as being absent in the experience of women, the humanistic psychology position that pride does not adequately account for anyone's experience, and the humanistic psychology idea that if pride emerges, it is always a false front designed to protect an undervalued self.

He considers the work of certain Neo-Freudian psychoanalysts, namely Karen Horney, and offers promise in addressing what he describes as a "deadlock between the overvalued and undervalued self".

Cooper refers to their work in describing the connection between religious and psychological pride as well as sin to describe how a neurotic pride system underlies an appearance of self-contempt and low self-esteem:

The "idealized self", the "tyranny of the should", the "pride system", and the nature of self-hate all point toward the intertwined relationship between neurotic pride and self-contempt. This framework helps in understanding how a neurotic pride system underlies an appearance of self-contempt and low self-esteem.

Thus, hubris, which is an exaggerated form of self-esteem, is sometimes actually a lie used to cover the lack of self-esteem the hubristic person feels deep down.

=== Hubris and group narcissism ===
Hubris is associated with more intra-individual negative outcomes and is often associated with expressions of aggression and hostility. Hubris is not necessarily associated with high self-esteem but with highly fluctuating or variable self-esteem. Excessive hubris tends to create conflict and sometimes leads to the termination of close relationships, which has led it to be understood as one of the few emotions with no clear positive or adaptive functions.

A group that boasts, gloats, or denigrates others tends to become a group with low social status or to be vulnerable to threats from other groups. UC Davis associate professor of psychology Cynthia Pickett, who has researched collective pride, has said that "hubristic, pompous displays of group pride might actually be a sign of group insecurity as opposed to a sign of strength". Pickett found that those who express pride by being filled with humility while focusing on members' efforts and hard work tend to achieve high social standing. Hubristic pride occurs when we experience pride in the absence of an eliciting event or even for eliciting events that we did not achieve.

Research from the University of Sydney found that hubristic pride is correlated with arrogance and self-aggrandizement and promotes prejudice and discrimination. However, authentic pride is associated with self-confidence and accomplishment and promotes more positive attitudes toward out-groups and stigmatized individuals.

== Ethnic ==
=== Across cultures ===
Pride in one's own ethnicity or one's own culture can be regarded positively, though, like earlier discussions on pride, it has been known to justify atrocity.

A contrast has been noted specifically between how pride manifests in the United States and China.

The value of pride in the individual or the society as a whole seems to be a running theme and debate among cultures. This debate shadows the discussion on pride so much so that perhaps the discussion on pride should not be about whether pride is necessarily good or bad, but about which form of it is the most useful.

In Western Christian traditions, pride has often been viewed negatively, largely due to its status as one of the Seven Deadly Sins. It was popularized by Pope Gregory I of the Catholic Church in the late sixth century, but before that, it was recognized by a Christian Monk named Evagrius Ponticus in the fourth century, as one of the evils human beings should resist.

=== German ===
In Germany, "national pride" ("Nationalstolz") is often associated with Nazism. Strong displays of national pride are, therefore, considered to be in poor taste by many Germans. There is an ongoing public debate about the issue of German patriotism. The 2006 World Cup in Germany saw a wave of patriotism sweep the country in a manner not seen for many years. Although many were hesitant to show such blatant support as the hanging of the national flag from windows, as the team progressed through the tournament, so too did the level of support across the nation.

=== Asian ===
The term "Asian pride" in modern usage refers mostly to those of East Asian descent, though it can include anyone of Asian descent. Asian pride was originally fragmented, as Asian nations have long had conflicts with each other; examples are the old Japanese and Chinese religious beliefs about their superiority. Asian pride emerged prominently during European colonialism. At one time, Europeans controlled 85% of the world's land through colonialism, resulting in anti-Western feelings among Asian nations. Today, some Asians still look upon European involvement in their affairs with suspicion. In contrast, Asian empires are proudly remembered by adherents of Asian Pride.

=== Black ===
"Black pride" is a slogan used primarily in the United States to raise awareness for a black racial identity. The slogan has been used by African Americans of sub-Saharan African origin or ancestry to denote a feeling of self-confidence, self-respect, and celebrating and being proud of one's heritage and worth.

=== White ===
White pride is a slogan used primarily, but not exclusively, in the United States to denote a feeling of pride in one's white racial identity and heritage. The slogan is, however, most prominently associated with white separatist, white nationalist, Neo-Nazi, and white supremacist organizations.

== Mad Pride ==
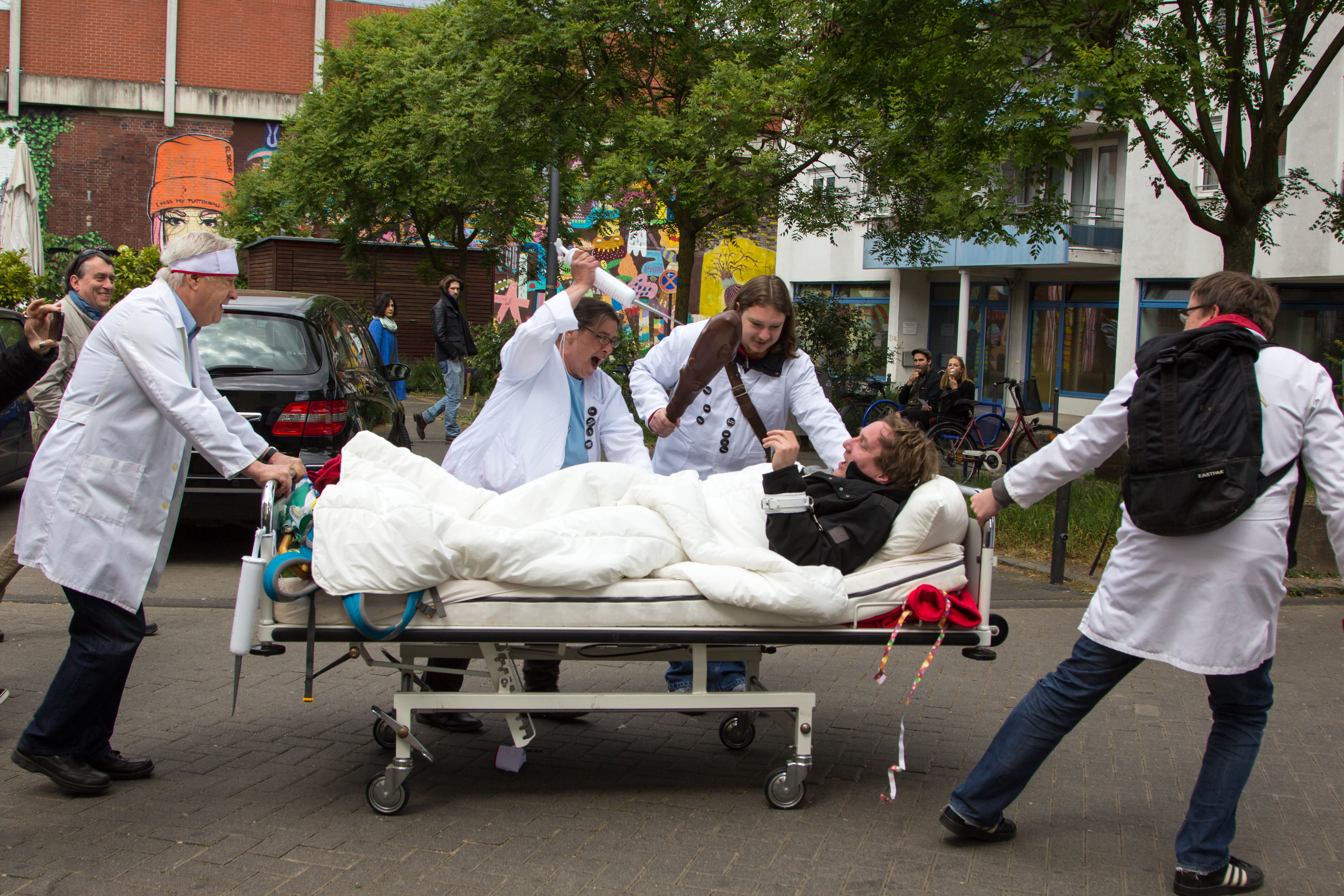
Bed Push at a Mad Pride parade in Cologne, Germany, in 2016

Mad Pride is a worldwide movement and philosophy that encourages individuals with mental illnesses, disorders, or difficulties to be proud of their 'madness'. The movement advocates for mutual support and rallies for the rights of individuals who define themselves as 'mad', and aims to popularize and destigmatize the word "mad" as a self-descriptor.

== LGBTQ+ Pride ==
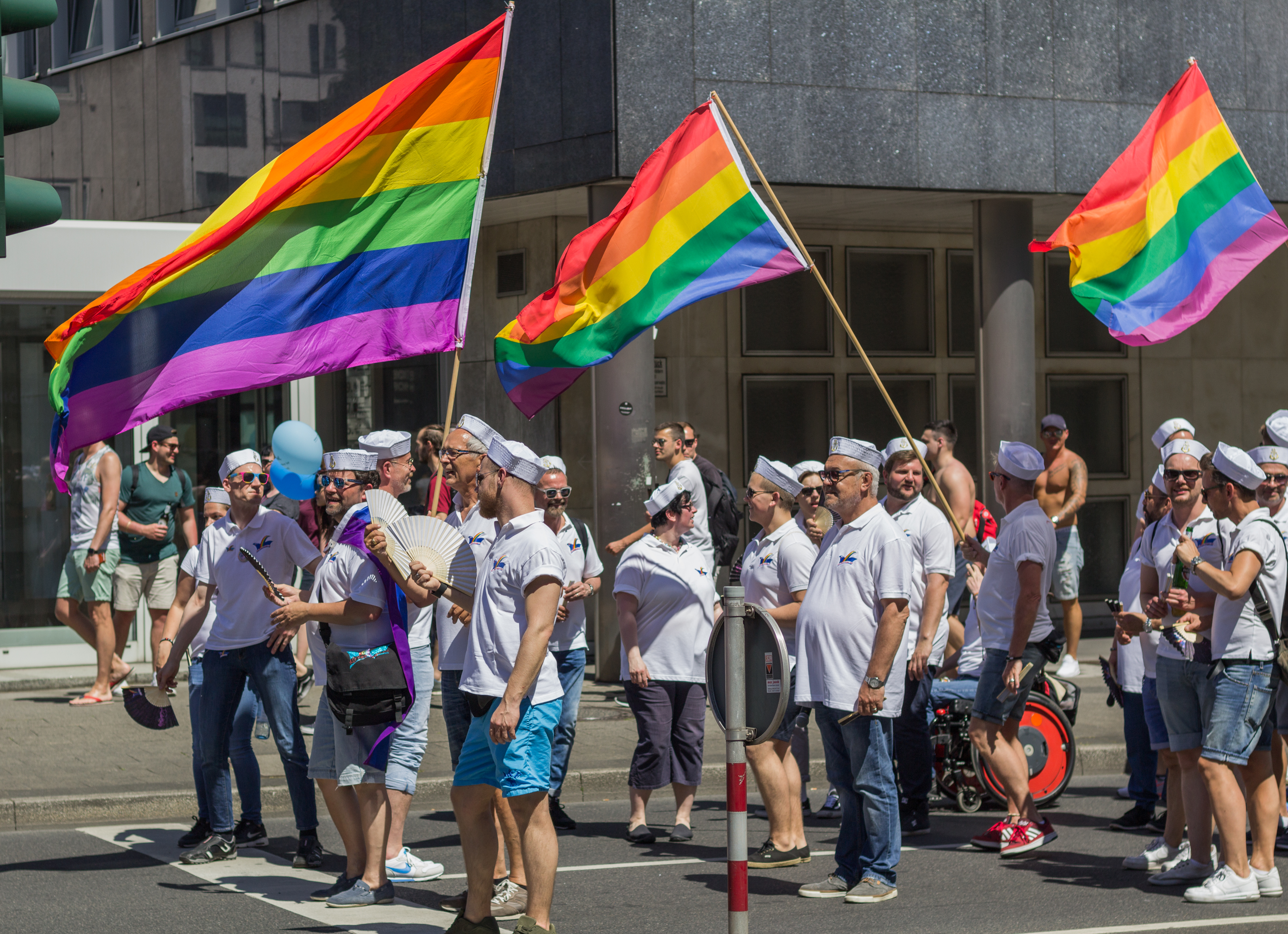
Pride parade, Düsseldorf 2017

LGBTQ+ pride is a worldwide movement which recognizes that lesbian, gay, bisexual, transgender, and queer (LGBTQ+) individuals should be proud of their sexual orientation and gender identity. LGBTQ+ pride includes advocacy for equal rights and benefits for LGBTQ+ people. The movement has three main premises: that people should be proud of their sexual orientation and gender identity; that sexual diversity is a gift; and that sexual orientation and gender identity are inherent and cannot be intentionally altered.

The word "pride" is used in this case as an antonym for "shame," and as an affirmation of self and community. The modern gay pride movement began after the Stonewall riots—the nearly week-long uprising between New York City youth and police officers following a raid of Stonewall Inn—of the late 1960s. In June 1970, the first pride parade in the United States commemorated the one-year anniversary of the Stonewall riots. Today, there are pride parades and celebrations in many cities and towns throughout the world, and numerous countries recognize an annual Pride Month, most commonly in June.

== Vanity ==
Vanity is sometimes used in a positive sense to refer to a rational concern for one's appearance, attractiveness, and dress, separate from pride as an emotion. It may also refer to an excessive or irrational belief in or concern with one's abilities or attractiveness in the eyes of others.

The term vanity originates from the Latin word vanitas, meaning emptiness, untruthfulness, futility, foolishness, and empty pride. Here, empty pride means a fake pride, in the sense of vainglory, unjustified by one's own achievements and actions but sought by pretense and appeals to superficial characteristics.

In many religions, vanity is considered a form of self-idolatry, in which one rejects the divine for the sake of one's own image, and thereby becomes divorced from the graces of their god. The stories of Lucifer and Narcissus (origin of the term narcissism), among others, attend to a pernicious aspect of vanity.

In Western art, vanity was often symbolized by a peacock, Biblical terms, and by the Whore of Babylon. During the Renaissance, it was typically represented as a naked woman, sometimes seated or reclining on a couch. She attends to her hair with a comb and a mirror. The mirror is sometimes held by a demon or a putto. Other symbols include jewels, gold coins, a purse, and the figure of Death.

Often depicted is an inscription on a scroll that reads Omnia Vanitas ("All is Vanity"), a quote from the Latin translation of the Book of Ecclesiastes. Although that phrase—itself depicted in a type of still life called vanitas—originally referred not to an obsession with one's appearance but to the ultimate fruitlessness of man's efforts in this world, the phrase summarizes the complete preoccupation of the subject of the picture. "The artist invites us to pay lip-service to condemning her", Edwin Mullins writes, "while offering us full permission to drool over her. She admires herself in the glass, while we treat the picture that purports to incriminate her as another kind of glass—a window—through which we peer and secretly desire her." The theme of the recumbent woman often merged artistically with the non-allegorical one of a reclining Venus.

Examples of vanity in art include:

- In his table of the seven deadly sins, Hieronymus Bosch depicts a bourgeois woman admiring herself in a mirror held up by a devil. Behind her is an open jewelry box.
- A painting attributed to Nicolas Tournier, which hangs in the Ashmolean Museum, is An Allegory of Justice and Vanity. A young woman holds a balance, symbolizing justice; she does not look at the mirror or the skull on the table before her.
- Vermeer's famous painting Girl with a Pearl Earring is sometimes believed to depict the sin of vanity, as the young girl has adorned herself before a glass without further positive allegorical attributes.
- All is Vanity, by Charles Allan Gilbert (1873–1929), carries on this theme. An optical illusion, the painting depicts what appears to be a large grinning skull. Upon closer examination, it reveals itself to be a young woman gazing at her reflection in the mirror of her vanity table.
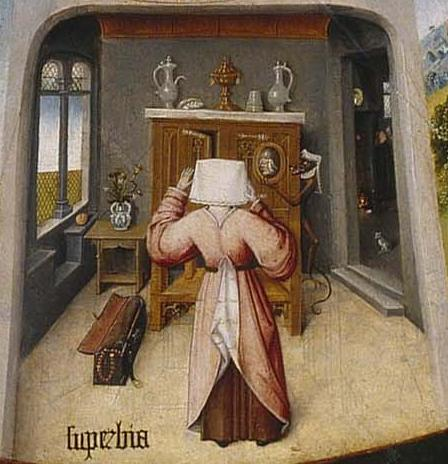
Detail of "Pride" in The Seven Deadly Sins and the Four Last Things by Hieronymus Bosch

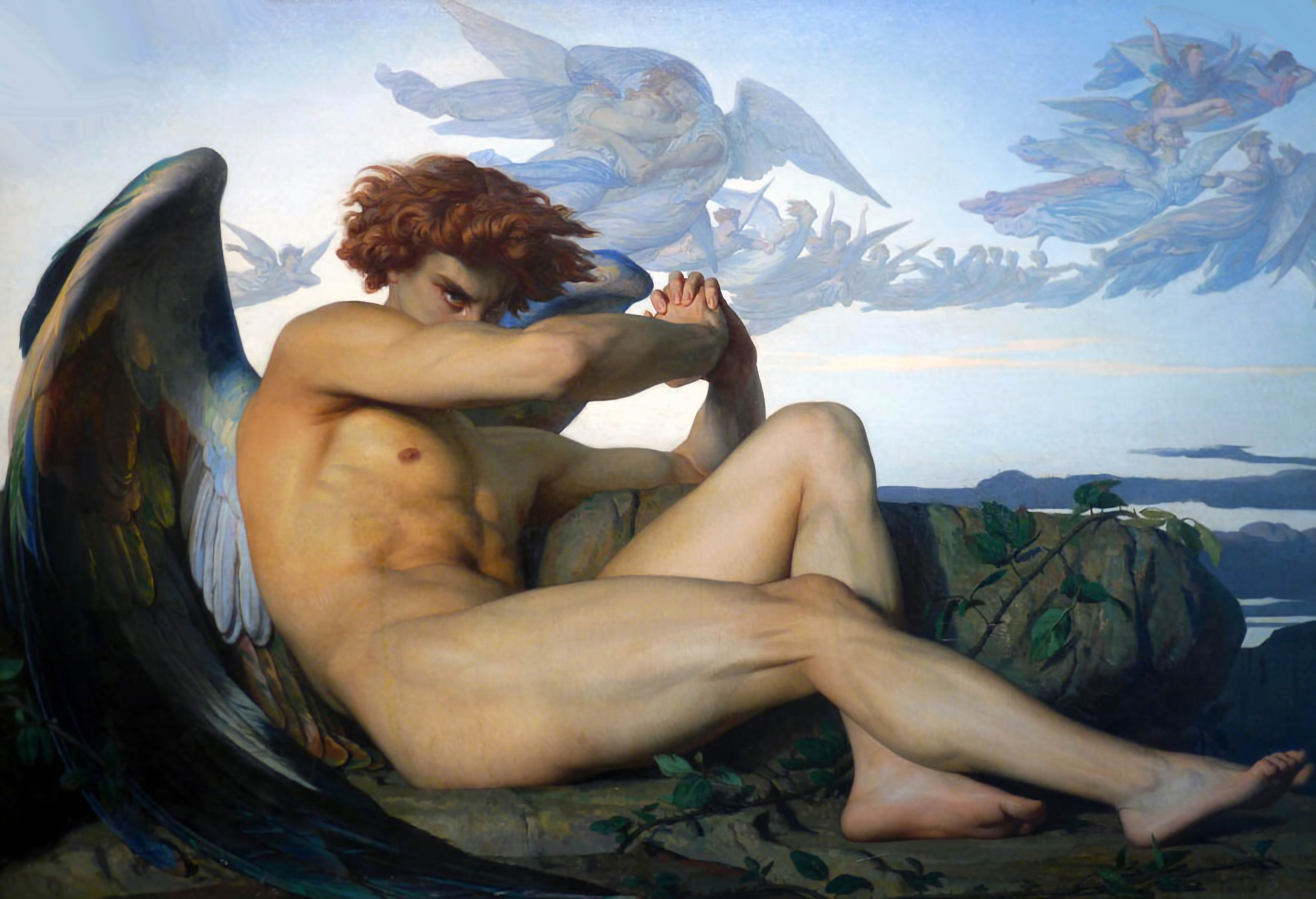
The Fallen Angel (1847) by Alexandre Cabanel, depicting Lucifer

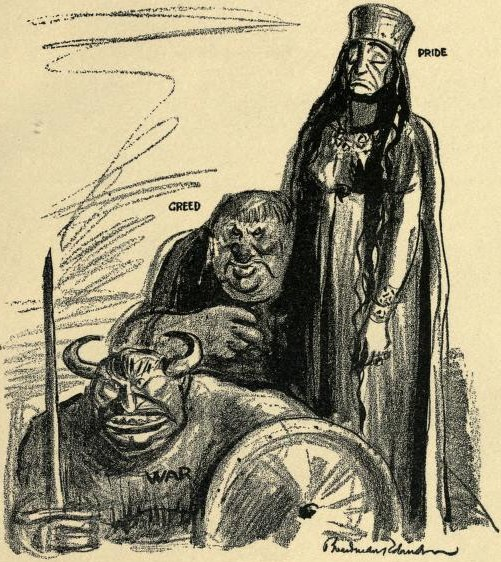
The Father and Mother by Boardman Robinson depicting War as the offspring of Greed and Pride

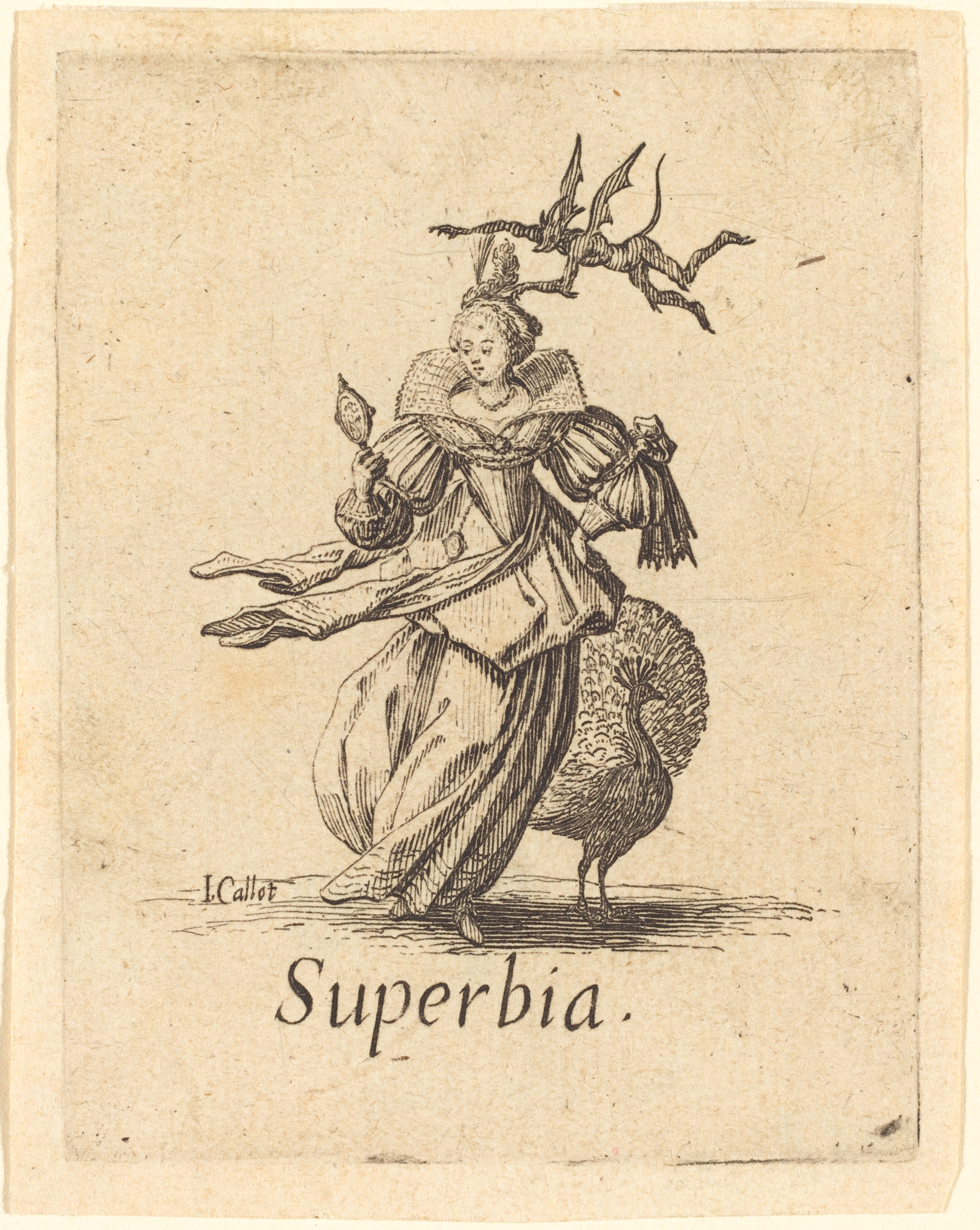
Jacques Callot, Pride (Vanity), probably after 1621

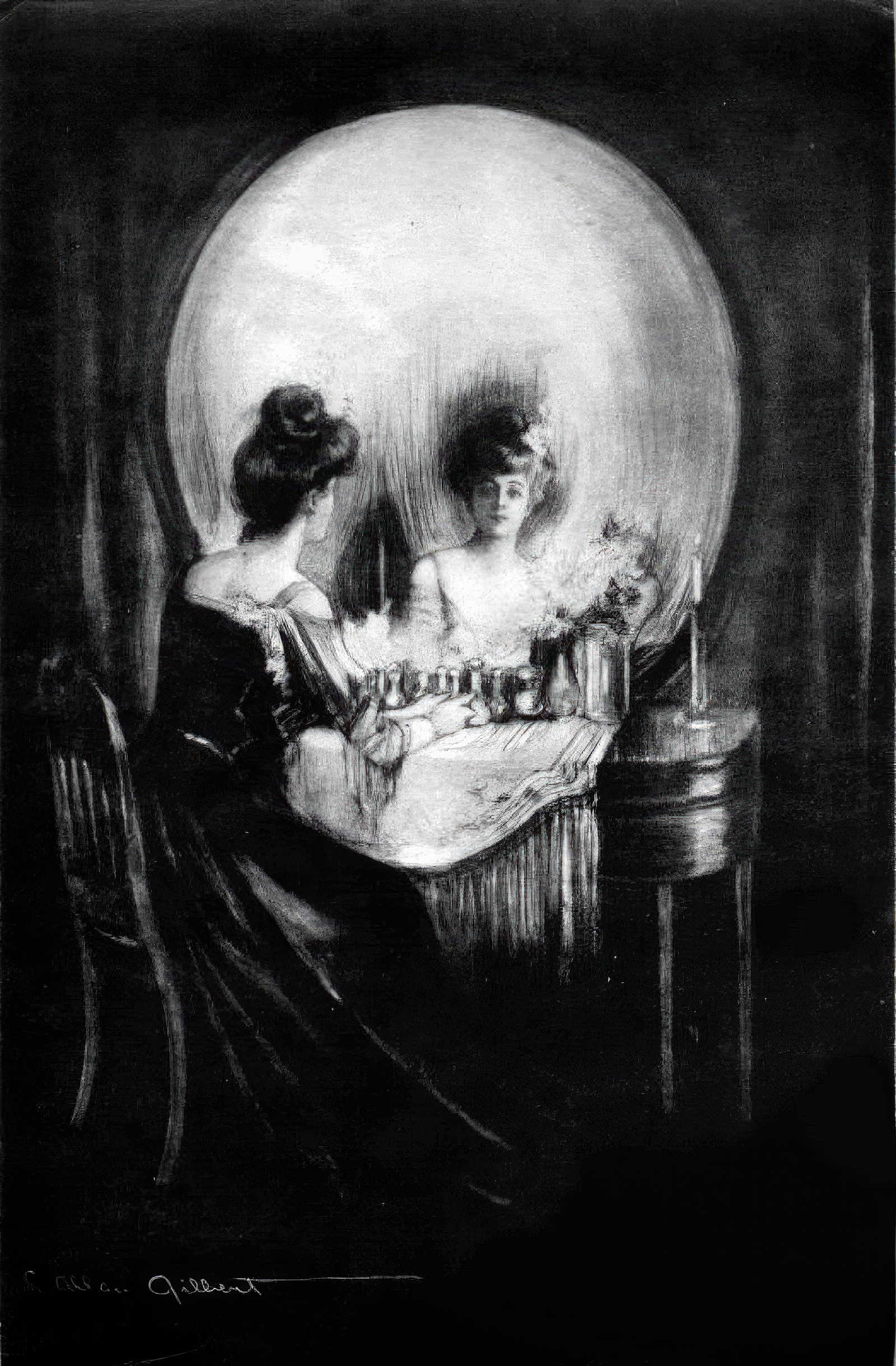
"All Is Vanity" by C. Allan Gilbert, evokes the inevitable decay of life and beauty toward death

== See also ==
- Confidence – Feeling of trust in someone or something
- Dignity – Person's right to be valued, respected and treated ethically
- Dunning–Kruger effect – Cognitive bias about one's own skill
- Grandiose delusions – Subtype of delusion
- Groupthink – Psychological phenomenon that occurs within a group of people
- Haughtiness – Positive effect from the perceived value of a person
- Icarus complex – Psychological complex
- Narcissism – Self-centered personality style
- Overconfidence effect – Personal cognitive bias
- Selfishness – Concern for self above that of others
- Self-serving bias – Distortion to enhance self-esteem, or to see oneself overly favorably
- The Seven Deadly Sins and the Four Last Things – Paintings by Hieronymus Bosch or a follower
- Seven virtues – Seven virtues in Christian tradition
- Vanity gallery – Art gallery that charges artists fees to exhibit their work
- Victory disease – Disastrous military action after victory
