= Maxi, Dick and Twink =

Irish vocal trio

- Origin: Dublin, Ireland
- Genres: Pop
- Years active: 1967–1971
- Label: Columbia Records
- Members: Irene McCoubrey; Barbara Dixon; Adele King

Maxi, Dick and Twink were an all-girl singing trio in Ireland in the late 1960s and early 1970s. Maxi is Irene McCoubrey (born 23 February 1950), Dick is Barbara Dixon (born 4 April 1952) and Twink is Adele King (born 4 April 1951).

== Formation ==
The group emerged from the 'Young Dublin Singers' who were playing in the Gaiety Theatre, Dublin one summer when producer Fred O'Donovan said he wanted backing singers for recordings. He chose McCoubrey, Dixon and King, and initially they did vocal backings for showbands on singles such as "Old Man Trouble" by The Royal Blues, "Nora" by Johnny McEvoy, "Quick Joey Small (Run Joey Run)" by The Real McCoy, "Cinnamon" by The Trixons, "Joys Of Love" by The Dixies and "Papa Sang Bass" by The Ranchers. In 1967 O'Donovan suggested they be launched as a group.

== Performances ==
They performed on Hughie Green's British TV showcase Opportunity Knocks and had a thirteen-week stint on Irish television series Steady As She Go-Goes. They made two 45 singles with Columbia Records, "Things You Hear About Me" (which had taken second place behind Dana's "All Kinds Of Everything" in the Irish National Song Contest in 1970) b/w "Catch The Bride's Bouquet" and "Tangerines Tangerines" b/w "Sweet Eye". The group toured Ireland and Britain before travelling to Canada in the freezing winter of 1970 with one of the top Irish bands of the time, The Bye-Laws; together they were known as 'The Toybox'. The tour went badly, according to Twink: "We seemed to be on an endless safari through the most abandoned outposts in the arctic part of the country. Our nerves got more and more on edge." There was a great deal of bickering and rowing and tension between the girls, and The Bye-Laws announced that they were breaking away. "This was in the William Pitt Hotel in Chatham, Manitoba, a one horse town which even the horses had left!". They invited Twink to go with them and she decided to do so; thus 'Maxi, Dick and Twink' came to an end. Naturally the other two girls were upset but they too realised that it was over for them as a group.

== Solo careers ==
The three members went on to considerable solo success. When they returned from Canada to Ireland that Spring of 1971, The Bye-Laws started to play around the cabaret joints as 'Twink and The Bye-Laws'. Soon afterwards Twink left to join Brendan Bowyer's new band 'The Big 8' between 1971 and 1974. Barbara Dixon sang with Bowyer's former group, 'The Royal Showband' during 1972, and married Peter Law of The Pacific Showband, with whom she emigrated to Canada in the mid-1970s. She released a solo album Take All Of Me in 1979 under her married name Barbara Law, as well as becoming an actress, including a Genie Award-nominated appearance in the thriller film Bedroom Eyes. Maxi sang with 'Danny Doyle and Music Box' before going solo. She represented Ireland twice in the Eurovision Song Contest: in 1973 singing "Do I Dream"; and again in 1981 with "Horoscopes", as part of another all-girl trio, 'Sheeba' with Marion Fossett and Frances Campbell. Sheeba also competed to be the Irish Eurovision entry in 1982 with "Go Raibh Maith Agat (Thank You)". Maxi then embarked on a career in radio and television broadcasting with the Irish national broadcaster RTÉ. Twink likewise entered the Irish national Eurovision competition in 1972 with "It'd Take A Miracle". Twink became an actress and regular TV celebrity. During an April 1982 episode of her RTÉ series Twink, Maxi, Dick and Twink staged a once-off reunion.
