= Down Home Country =

- Genre: Country music
- Presented by: Tom Gallant
- Country of origin: Canada
- Original language: English
- No. of seasons: 1

Production
- Producer: Stan Jacobson
- Running time: 60 minutes

Original release
- Network: CBC Television
- Release: 11 July – 5 September 1975

Down Home Country is a Canadian country music television series that aired on CBC Television in 1975.

== Premise ==
New Brunswick singer-songwriter Tom Gallant hosted this series which replaced The Tommy Hunter Show between seasons. Series regulars included vocal trio Blue Jane, comic duo Chuck Wagon (Harvey Atkin) and Luke Warm (Peter Cullen), and musician Nancy White. The series featured visiting artists such as Chad Allan, Jessi Colter, The Good Brothers, Waylon Jennings, Myrna Lorrie, Colleen Peterson, Kenny Rogers, Sneezy Waters and Jesse Winchester.

== Scheduling ==
This hour-long series was broadcast on Fridays at 10:00 p.m. (Eastern) from 11 July to 5 September 1975.
