= You Love Me I Hate You =

- Directed by: Rosamund Owen
- Written by: Moira Dann
- Produced by: Myra Fried
- Starring: Azura Bates; Dov Tiefenbach; Christian Matheson; Lesleh Donaldson; Jessica Johnson
- Cinematography: Harry Lake
- Edited by: Roushell Goldstein
- Music by: John McCarthy
- Production company: Canadian Film Centre
- Release date: September 9, 1994 (TIFF)
- Running time: 22 minutes
- Country: Canada
- Language: English

You Love Me I Hate You is a Canadian drama short film, directed by Rosamund Owen and released in 1994. Set in the 1960s, the film centres on the coming-of-age of Bernadette (Azura Bates), a young girl who is being bullied at school by Eric (Dov Tiefenbach) and witnessing the fighting of her parents (Christian Matheson, Lesleh Donaldson) at home, leading her toward the belief that love can only be expressed through anger.

The film premiered at the 1994 Toronto International Film Festival.

The film was a Genie Award nominee for Best Theatrical Short Film at the 16th Genie Awards.
