= Hotel Infierno =

- Directed by: Marcos Palmieri
- Written by: Marcos Palmieri
- Produced by: Ezio Massa; Magalí Nieva
- Starring: Laura Angrisani; Martin Benedettelli; Ximena Fassi
- Cinematography: Celeste Ianina Barrera; Lucia Sokolsky Vazquez
- Edited by: Marcos Palmieri
- Music by: Rodrigo Soko
- Production companies: Malevo Films Argentina; Milonga Entertainment; Ninja Films
- Distributed by: Primer Plano Film Group
- Release date: 31 October 2015 (Mexico)
- Running time: 84 min
- Country: Argentina
- Language: Spanish
- Box office: US$3,784

Hotel Infierno (English: Infernal Hotel) is a 2015 Argentine drama-horror film, produced by Mavelo Films Argentina, Milonga Entertainment and Ninja Films.

== Plot ==
Stranded during a storm in the middle of nowhere, a couple, Federico and the pregnant Vanesa, arrive at a provincial hotel and are offered lodgement for the night, with free breakfast in the morning. Feeling something is not right, Vanesa tells Federico that they should leave but he refuses because the hotel is the only property in miles.

The hotel's keeper, Remedios, and its groundskeeper, Jacinto, are a helpful, older couple with teenage twin children, brother and sister Francisco and Lucila. Remedios enjoys talking to her guests and finds out that Vanesa is, to Remedios' pleasure, 4 months pregnant. Francisco and Lucila, meanwhile, spend their time playing a Ouija type game with another guest couple, Esteban and Teresa Rivero, trying to communicate with their father, which Lucila and Francisco at first thought was Jacinto, but which they later learned had died. Remedios and Jacinto are reluctant to Lucila and Francisco trying to investigate who their father was.

Jacinto surprises Esteban looking through Jacinto's gardening tools and Esteban becomes horrified but he walks away from the tool's room convinced something sinister took place there. As he, his wife Teresa and the teenagers continue playing the game for more clues about what happened to the teens' father, they have visions in which Jacinto had killed their dad and buried him within the hotel. Jacinto tells Remedio that maybe it's time that they reveal the truth about their father to the teens, which infuriates and worries her.

Later on, it is revealed that, on another stormy night about 15 years before, another man and his pregnant wife had arrived at the hotel hoping to stay one night. Remedios, who was a deeply disturbed but religious woman, had been praying to God for Him to let her have children. The pregnant woman went into labor and had no choice but to give birth right away; Remedios helped her give birth, but then killed her by asphyxiating her by pulling a pillow on top of her face, in order to keep the children, which she saw as God's answer to her prayers. Upon seeing his wife dead on the hotel room bed, her husband attacked Remedios, trying to kill her and regain the newborn children. But Jacinto saw this and hit him on the back of his head with a hammer, killing him instantly.

Afraid that Jacinto was about to reveal all of this to the kids, Remedios kills him and then places a rope over his neck so that it is apparent he committed suicide instead. The teens find his body and then she runs into his room and starts crying and yelling at them, telling them its their fault that he killed himself. After they leave the room, she stops crying and talks to Jacinto's dead body, then the kids learn their parents' fate and how they got to live in the hotel.

Confronted by the teens, Remedios kills them. At this point in the film, the second couple arrives at the hotel, returning to the film's starting scene. Remedios comfortably and amicably chats with them, offering them free breakfast the next morning.

== Critical response ==
As of 2019, the film had no critical consensus on the film critics website Rottentomatoes.com.

The film was given a positive review by critic Adolfo C. Martinez of Argentine daily newspaper La Nación. Martinez praised Marcos Palmieri's ability to "influx all the ingredients necessary to satisfy the genre's followers" as well as to make the hotel structure itself "another character (in the film)". He also praised actors Maria Alejandra Figueroa, Lucia Guzman and Diego Sampayo and the movie's technicians.

== Cast ==
- Laura Angrisani
- Martin Benedettelli as Federico
- Ximena Fassi as Vanesa
- Melisa Fernandez as Teresa Rivero
- Maria Alejandra FIgueroa as Remedios
- Lucia Guzman as Lucila
- Julio Luparello as Jacinto
- Martin Pereyra as Francisco
- Laura Pezzi as pregnant woman number 1
- Diego Sampayo as Esteban

== See also ==
- Funeral Home – a 1980 Canadian film with a similar plot
