= Barbara Law =

Irish-Canadian actress and singer

- Born: 4 April 1952 (age 73)
- Occupations: Actress; Singer
- Years active: 1965–1997
- Spouse: Peter Law

Barbara Law, née Dixon (born 4 April 1952) is an Irish-Canadian actress and singer. First prominent in Ireland with the pop trio Maxi, Dick and Twink and Brendan Bowyer's Royal Showband, she moved to Canada in the early 1970s after marrying Peter Law of The Pacific Showband. While the Pacific Showband continued to record and perform in its own right under the new name Dublin Corporation, Peter and Barbara Law also performed separately as co-vocalists for the band Sweet Chariot.

In 1978, Law and Grant Smith performed the opening number at the Juno Awards of 1978, a dance routine set to the song "Step Out" from the film Outrageous!. Later the same year, she appeared alongside Taborah Johnson, Louis Negin, Richard Adams and Liliane Stillwell in Bananas, a musical revue at Toronto's Bayview Theatre which was directed by Jack Creley. In 1979, she appeared in Allan Guttman's cabaret show Tonight at 8:30...9 O'Clock in Newfoundland.

She released the disco album Take All of Me on Pavilion Records in 1979, scoring a minor dance club hit with the album's title track.

In the 1980s she worked as an actress, most prominently in the films The Surrogate and Bedroom Eyes, and received a Genie Award nomination for Best Supporting Actress for the latter film. In 1984, she portrayed Katharine Hepburn in Cliff Jones's Howard Hughes musical For the Love of Howard, opposite Ross Petty as Hughes.

She also had guest roles in the television film The Popcorn Man, the television series Adderly, Night Heat, Diamonds, Katts and Dog, Counterstrike and Due South, and a minor role in the film The Planet of Junior Brown.

== Filmography ==
Barbara Law film and television credits
Year	Title	Role	Notes	Ref.
1984	The Surrogate	Maggie Simpson	Theatrical film	
1984	Bedroom Eyes	Jobeth	Theatrical film	
1986–1987	Night Heat	Francie / Sonia Mann / Natalie	3 episodes	
1987	Adderly	Tamira	1 episode	
1988	The Return of Ben Casey	Della	Television film	
1988	Diamonds	Unknown	1 episode	
1990	Counterstrike	Chantal	Episode: "The Beginning" (S1.E14)	
1991	Katts and Dog	Unknown	Episode: "The Fugitive" (S3.E17)	
1992	Counterstrike	Juliette	Episode: "Till Death Do Us Part" (S3.E3)	
1993	Spenser: Ceremony	Madame	Television film	
1995	Long Island Fever	Georgia	Television film	
1996	Due South	Sunny	1 episode	
1997	The Planet of Junior Brown	Rich Girl	Theatrical film	
