= Chasing Rainbows (TV series) =

- Genre: Drama
- Written by: Douglas Bowie
- Directed by: William Fruet; Bruce Pittman; Mark Blandford; Susan Martin
- Starring: Paul Gross; Michael Riley; Julie Stewart
- Country of origin: Canada
- No. of seasons: 1
- No. of episodes: 14

Original release
- Network: CBC Television
- Release: 1988 – 1988

Chasing Rainbows is a Canadian television drama miniseries that aired on CBC Television in 1988. It was the first television series in the world filmed with then-new Sony HDVS technology.

Set in Montreal in the period after World War I, the series starred Paul Gross and Michael Riley as Jake Kincaid and Christopher Blaine, two veterans readapting to peacetime civilian life at the dawn of the Jazz Age. Kincaid initially takes a job as a manager of a brothel which he transforms into a thriving jazz nightclub, while Blaine struggles with a life of small-time criminality and alcoholism. Their friendship is tested when Paula Ashley (Julie Stewart), an aspiring playwright and Blaine's girlfriend, begins an affair with Kincaid.

Supporting cast members included Booth Savage, Richard Yearwood, Patricia Hamilton, Thomas Peacocke, Jill Frappier, Lesleh Donaldson, Eric Keenleyside, Peter Boretski, Sophie Léger and Robert Bockstael.

A dubbed French-language version also aired on Télévision de Radio-Canada in the following season, under the title Jeunes loups des années folles.

The series garnered four Gemini Award nominations, for Best Performance by a Supporting Actor (Peter Boretski), Best Performance by a Supporting Actress (Sophie Léger), Best Costume Design (Suzanne Mess) and Best Music Composition for a Series — Dramatic Underscore (Neil Chotem).
