= The Pacific Showband =

- Labels: Pye Records; Tribune Records

The Pacific Showband were a popular Irish showband group in the 1960s.

They were formed as a result of some members leaving the Earl Gill Orchestra and deciding to form their own band. They had a number of hits during the 1960s. They released 20 singles from 1964 to 1970 on the Pye Records and Tribune Records labels.

In 1968, Peter Law joined the band as a vocalist. The following year the band undertook their first tour of Canada, touring that country several more times before moving there permanently in 1971 and changing their name to Dublin Corporation. Under their new name, they had chart hits in Canada with "Melting Pot" and "Come and Join Us", and released the album Limited on Arc Records in 1973. Although they never released any further albums or singles, they remained active for a number of years thereafter as a touring band. Law and his wife, Barbara Dixon of the pop trio Maxi, Dick and Twink, also performed separately as co-vocalists for the band Sweet Chariot.

== Past members ==
- Shay Curran - piano/organ/trombone
- Jimmy Dumpleton - guitar
- Seán Fagan - vocals/trombone/trumpet
- Marty Fanning - drums
- Austin Halpin - trumpet
- Paul Keogh - guitar
- Sonny Knowles - saxophone
- Freddie Martin - trumpet
- Dave Murphy - guitar
- Harry Parker - bass
- Paddy Reynolds - saxophone

== Discography ==
=== 45 ===
- 1967 - For He's A Jolly Good Fellow / She Thinks I Still Care - Tribune TRS 106
- 1967 - My Jenny / Since I Don't Have You - Tribune TRS 110
- 1968 - My Lovely Rose And You / I'll Remember You - Tribune TRS124
- 1968 - The Long Black Veil / You'll Never Get The Chance Again - Major Minor Records MM545
- 1969 - Remains To Be Seen / We Are Happy People - Tribune TRS 125
- 1969 - My Mothers Eyes / Sunday Drive - Tribune TRS 128
- 1969 - Ruby / Red Sails In The Sunset - Tribune TRS 131
- 1970 - Momma's Waiting / Rollin' Common - Tribune TRS 140
- 1971 - Melting Pot / Rollin' Common (as 'The Dublin Corporation', released only in Canada) - Franklin 643
- 1972 - Come And Join Us (as 'The Dublin Corporation', released only in Canada) - Yorkville YORK 45067

=== LP ===
1969 - Peter Law & The Sound Of The Pacific, Capitol ST 6324 (Canada)

Track Listing:

- I Don't Want To Live (Greg Hambleton)
- Remains To Be Seen (Kipner-Groves)
- Red Sails In The Sunset (Kennedy)
- My Jenny (Graham Bonnie)
- Night Stick Shifter (Peter Law)
- My Lovely Rose And You (Moran-George)
- Ruby (Mel Tillis)
- I'll Remember You (Kviokalani-Lee)
- My Mothers Eyes (Gilbert-Baer)
- We Are Happy People (Alan Dale)
- Sing Me Back Home (Merle Haggard)
- Since I Don't Have You (Rock-Martin-Beaumont-Bogel-Lester-Taylor-Berschren)

Musicians on album:

Shamey Curran: trombone
Sean Fagan: vocal
Martin Fanning: drums
Austin Halpin: trumpet
Dave Murphy: guitar
Peter Law: vocal
Harry Parker: bass
Paddy Reynolds: saxophone

1973 - The Dublin Corporation (Canada) Limited (released only in Canada), Arc DCLP-1 Track Listing:

1. Truckin
2. Come & Join Us (Cousin Norman)
3. Hannigan's Hooley
4. Tie a Yellow Ribbon
5. Danny Boy
6. Goodnight Irene
7. The Letter
8. God Love Rock & Roll
9. Soul Shake
10. Unchained Melody
11. More
12. More/Somewhere

Musicians on album:

Shay Curran: trombone, flute & vocals
Sean Fagan: vocals & trumpet
Marty Fanning: drums & vocals
Austin Halpin: trumpet & vocals
Dave Murphy: guitar & vocals
Mick Roche: vocals
Harry Parker: bass & vocals
Paddy Reynolds: saxophones, clarinet & vocals
