= Death Weekend =

1976 Canadian film by William Fruet

- Original theatrical poster
- Directed by: William Fruet
- Written by: William Fruet
- Produced by: Ivan Reitman
- Starring: Brenda Vaccaro; Don Stroud; Chuck Shamata
- Cinematography: Robert Saad
- Edited by: Debra Karen; Jean LaFleur
- Production companies: DAL Productions Ltd.; Canadian Film Development Corporation; Famous Players; Quadrant Films Ltd.
- Distributed by: Cinépix Film Properties
- Release date: September 17, 1976 (Canada)
- Running time: 88 minutes
- Countries: Canada; Italy; Panama
- Language: English
- Budget: $500,000
- Box office: $550,000 (Canada)

Death Weekend is a 1976 horror film written and directed by William Fruet, and starring Brenda Vaccaro, Don Stroud, and Chuck Shamata. Set in rural Ontario, the film follows a model and her boyfriend who are terrorized by four violent criminals at a remote lakeside home following a road rage incident.

Loosely inspired by a real home invasion case in Canada, Death Weekend was filmed on location in the fall of 1975 in Maple, Ontario. It was an international co-production between Canada, Italy, and Panama, with half of its $500,000 budget origination from the Canadian Film Development Corporation. It was produced by Ivan Reitman, marking his second film production credit after David Cronenberg's Shivers (1975).

Death Weekend premiered in Ontario on September 17, 1976, before opening in Quebec on October 8, 1976. In the United States, the film was distributed in 1977 by American International Pictures under the alternate title The House by the Lake.

== Plot ==
Diane, a former fashion model, meets Harry, a wealthy dentist and playboy. After a whirlwind romance, she decides to accompany Harry to party at his remote lakeside country house on a November weekend. En route in Harry's Corvette, Diane asks Harry to let her drive.

They soon encounter a red-colored 1967 Camaro loaded with four drunken thugs, led by Lep, and get into a fit of road rage where Diane forces the punks off the road and into a creek bed, wrecking their car. At the lake house, Harry surreptitiously photographs Diane while she showers. Diane soon learns that there are no other guests joining them at the house, and that Harry has brought her there intending only to use her for sex.

Meanwhile, the gang rampages through a camping park looking for the car that ran them off the road. They find Harry's Corvette parked at a rural gas station where Harry had left it to be looked after while taking a less flashy station wagon to the country house. After intimidating the drunk station owners to disclose Harry's residence, Lep and his friends drive off to their destination.

The four thugs break into the lake house and hold both Diane and Harry hostage. Over the rest of the day and night, Lep and his three cohorts Runt, Frankie, and Stanley, terrorize, harass, and humiliate their two captives. The group vandalize the house and steal and wreck Harry's speedboat, killing two townspeople in the process. When Diane attempts to escape, Lep recaptures her and, as punishment, rapes her in an abandoned shack.

At nightfall, the gang becomes more out of control while drinking and smoking marijuana. Harry confronts them with a pump-action shotgun, but he hesitates to shoot and Lep snatches the weapon from his hands. Lep then uses it to kill Harry as he attempts to flee from the house, and Diane is taken to a bedroom to be raped again, this time by Runt. Diane fights back and eventually kills Runt by slashing his neck with a shard of mirror glass and she manages to flee from the house. She later traps Frankie in the boathouse and sets it on fire, leaving him to burn to death. She then lures the pursuing Stanley to a nearby bog where he falls into a quicksand pit and drowns.

In the morning, Diane and the shotgun-toting Lep face off in a final confrontation in an open field where she attempts to hotwire and escape in Harry's car (with Harry's dead body in the front seat) as Lep tries to shoot her with the shotgun. When Lep runs out of ammunition, he climbs on top of the moving car to stop Diane attempting to drive away. The confrontation ends when Diane manages to shake Lep off the hood, and then runs him over, killing him.

Diane drives the bullet-ridden car away to a paved road where the car stalls on the side of the road. Exhausted and dazed, she exits the damaged car and stares down the empty road.

== Cast ==
- Brenda Vaccaro as Diane
- Don Stroud as Lep
- Chuck Shamata as Harry
- Richard Ayres as Runt
- Kyle Edwards as Frankie
- Don Granberry as Stanley
- Ed McNamara as Spragg
- Michael Kirby as Ralph
- Richard Donat as policeman

== Production ==
=== Development ===
Death Weekend was loosely based on a real-life home invasion in Canada involving a dentist after he was involved in a traffic altercation, as well as Fruet's own experience of being harassed by a group of men while on a road trip in rural Alberta.

=== Filming ===
The film was originally titled Thanksgiving and Do Or Die during production before being titled Death Weekend. It was shot from October 27, 1975 to December 1, 1975, on a budget of $500,000, with $250,000 coming from the Canadian Film Development Corporation. The film was an international co-production between Canada, Italy, and Panama. It marked filmmaker Ivan Reitman's second production credit, after David Cronenberg's Shivers (1975).

Principal photography occurred at Seneca College and in Maple, Ontario, as well as at the Toronto International Film Studios in Kleinburg.

== Release ==
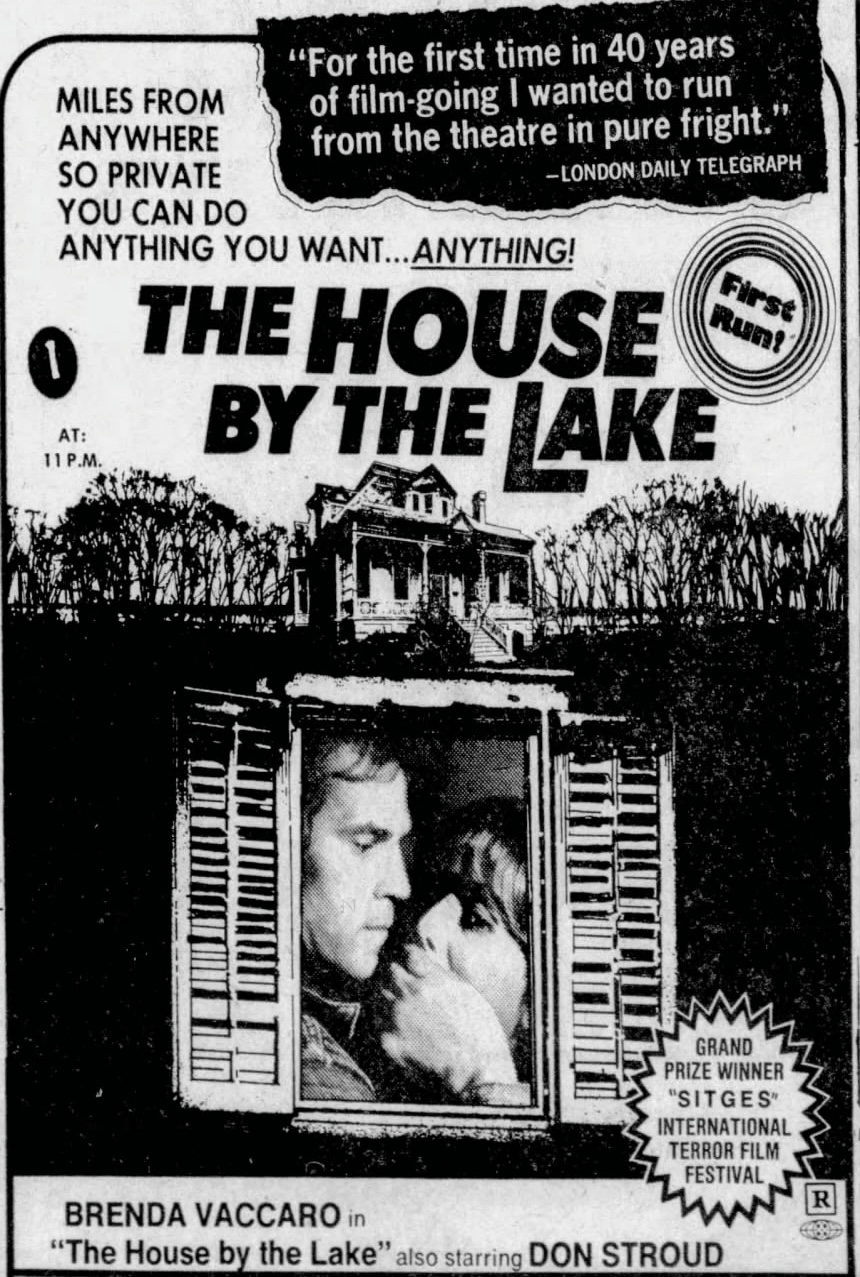
Newspaper advertisement in Lexington Herald-Leader, 1977

Death Weekend was distributed by Cinépix Film Properties in Canada, premiering in Ontario on September 17, 1976 in seventeen venues. The film screened in Quebec under the French-language title Fin De Semaine Infernale beginning on October 8, 1976, in five venues. In the United Kingdom, it was released in some regions on December 10, 1976, where it received an X rating.

In the United States, the film was distributed in 1977 by American International Pictures, who re-titled it The House by the Lake in an attempt to capitalize on the similarly-themed rape and revenge film The Last House on the Left (1972). It sometimes screened as a double feature with The Little Girl Who Lives Down the Lane (1976), another American International Pictures release.

The film was not released in Sweden until August 17, 1990, when it opened at the Rigoletto cinema in Stockholm.

=== Home media ===
Vestron Video released Death Weekend on VHS in October 1985. VHS editions of the film were seized and confiscated in the United Kingdom under Section 3 of the Obscene Publications Act 1959 during the video nasty panic.

On December 4, 2017, the movie was released uncut on DVD in Sweden by the distributor Studio S Entertainment. The company released a Blu-ray edition on April 25, 2022.

In July 2019, a limited edition Blu-ray and DVD mediabook release was made available in seven different artwork variants by the German distributor NSM Records.

== Reception ==
=== Box office ===
Death Weekend grossed $550,000 at the Canadian box office.

=== Critical response ===
Death Weekend received largely unfavorable reviews from Canadian film critics, with many citing its perceived lack of Canadian-centered themes and an attempt at appealing to the international market. Michael Walsh of The Province praised Vaccaro's lead performance, but described the film as "exploitative" and a "mindless shocker." Gerald Pratley criticized the film as "a shoddy tale of rape and violence".

Frances Taylor, a critic for The Jersey Journal, found the film tasteless, writing: "The entire movie is filled with such ugliness of every kind that it's difficult to understand why this script was used. This is obscenity in every sense of the word." Desmond Ryan of The Philadelphia Inquirer said that it "has the look of a film assembled to support the preposterous and vengeful bloodletting that concludes it." Joan Finn, writing for the Paterson, New Jersey Morning News, panned the film, finding the performances "completely subordinate to the plot" and criticizing Vaccaro's portrayal, though she did find Stroud's performance "convincing."

Kevin Thomas of the Los Angeles Times wrote that he could "not justify the The House by the Lake's extreme, exploitative brutality," deeming it "trash, but Fruet clearly did try to make something more of it than that." Writing for the New York Daily News, Ann Guarino described the film as "a frightening, ugly suspense film" and noted the performances as admirable, though she ultimately described the casting as a "waste of talent on such a dreadful story."

=== Accolades ===
Award/association	Year	Category	Subject	Result	Ref.
Sitges Film Festival	1977	Best Actress	Brenda Vaccaro	Won	
Sitges Film Festival	1977	Best Screenplay	William Fruet	Won	
Sitges Film Festival	1977	International Critics' Jury Prize	William Fruet	Won	

== Legacy ==
Film writer Rob Craig cites Death Weekend as a "historically missing link" in a series of horror and rape and revenge films of the 1970s, identifying it as a precursor to I Spit on Your Grave (1978). He adds: "The screenplay, though predictable, is never dull, and contains some themes (sadism and torture) and language ("You god damn fuckin' cunt!") considered somewhat strong for the time. The photography is also effective, and the film manages to build considerable suspense through judicious editing."

In promotion of a 2013 revival screening of the film, the Film Society of Lincoln Center noted it as a progenitor films such as The Strangers (2008) as well as, "in its pitting of class versus class, Michael Haneke's Funny Games (1997)."

== See also ==
- List of films featuring home invasions
- Rape and revenge film

== Sources ==
- Corupe, Paul (2015). "Who's in the Driver's Seat: The Canadian Brute Unleashed in Death Weekend". In Freitag, Gina; Loiselle, André (eds.). The Canadian Horror Film: Terror of the Soul. Toronto, Ontario: University of Toronto Press. pp. 91–107. ISBN 978-1-442-62404-7.
- Craig, Rob (2019). American International Pictures: A Comprehensive Filmography. Jefferson, North Carolina: McFarland & Company. ISBN 978-1-476-66631-0.
- Freitag, Gina; Loiselle, André, eds. (2015). The Canadian Horror Film: Terror of the Soul. Toronto, Ontario: University of Toronto Press. ISBN 978-1-442-62404-7.
- Izay, Ryan (2025). Home Invasion Horrors: A History and Analysis of Cinematic Break-Ins. Jefferson, North Carolina: McFarland & Company. ISBN 978-1-476-69308-8.
- Turner, D. John, ed. (1987). Canadian Feature Film Index: 1913-1985. Ottawa, Ontario: Canadian Film Institute. ISBN 0-660-53364-2.
