= Lip service =

Lip service may refer to:

== Film and television ==
- Lip Service (1988 film), an American comedy TV film
- Lip Service (TV series), a 2010 dramatic series broadcast on BBC Three
- Lip Service (game show), a 1990s game show aired on MTV
- Lip Service (2000 film), a television film starring Gail O'Grady and Kari Wuhrer
- Lipservice, a 1998 comedy short with Seán McGinley
- "Lip Service" (Inside No. 9), a 2021 TV episode

== Music ==
- Lip Service (group), a South Korean duo
- "Lip Service", a 1992 song by Wet Wet Wet from the album High on the Happy Side
- "Lip Service", a 1978 song by Elvis Costello from This Year's Model
- "Lip Service", a 1993 song by Debbie Harry from the album Debravation
- “Lip Service”, a 2019 song by Thaiboy Digital with Ecco2K from Legendary Member
- Lipservice, a 2005 album by Gotthard

== Other ==
- Lip Service, a clothing company founded by Drew Bernstein
