= Bedroom Eyes (film) =

- Directed by: William Fruet
- Written by: Michael Alan Eddy
- Produced by: Robert Lantos; Stephen J. Roth
- Starring: Kip Gilman; Barbara Law; Jayne Catling; Christine Cattell; James B. Douglas; Alf Humphreys
- Cinematography: Miklós Lente
- Edited by: Tony Lower
- Music by: Paul Hoffert; John Tucker
- Distributed by: Double Helix Films
- Release date: November 30, 1984
- Running time: 90 min.
- Country: Canada
- Language: English

Bedroom Eyes is a 1984 erotic thriller film starring Kip Gilman and Barbara Law and directed by William Fruet.

== Plot ==
A young businessman and avid jogger finds a prime voyeurism spot on his nightly route. After some time spying he witnesses a murder instead. He soon becomes involved in a variety of situations stemming from the incident.

== Cast ==
- Kip Gilman as Harry Ross (credited as Kenneth Gilman)
- Barbara Law as Jobeth
- Jayne Catling as Mary Kittrick
- Christine Cattell as Caroline
- James B. Douglas as Coroner Robbins
- Dayle Haddon as Alex
- Alf Humphreys as Cantrell
- Paula Barrett as The Secretary
- Al Bernardo as Monroe
- Angus MacInnes as Lathan
- Nick Nichols as Hickman
- Lawrence K. Philips as Bert
- Bunty Webb as Mrs. Shukeiss
