= Lip Service (2000 film) =

Lip Service (also known as Out of Sync) is a 2000 musical, comedy and drama film. The film was directed by Graeme Campbell. It aired on VH1 on July 12, 2000. The film deals with topics which are similar to the famous Milli Vanilli scandal except the lip synching artist is a mid-20s female.

== Plot ==
Record producer Roger Deacon and his partner Buddo hold auditions for female singers at Deacon's studio. Ultimately, none of the auditionees are selected. Deacon and one of his record managers, Lowell Levitt, head into a nightclub later that night, where Deacon and his friend Skeesix, an ex-narcotics dealer, meet the primary label manager Sidney Golden. Golden and Levitt introduce Sunni, a mid-20s redhead female who looks pretty, but does not have proper talent or the right singing voice for Deacon's pop songs. Sunni is therefore used for lip synching the songs.

Meanwhile, housewife Maggie Stanley has dreamed of becoming a singer. She goes into Deacon's studio and records several songs. However, she doesn't realize that Roger and Lowell plan on using Sunni to mime the songs. Maggie later gets whiplash after accidentally crashing her minivan. After coming home from the hospital, she sees Sunni miming her vocals in a music video. Maggie also gets angry with Deacon for using Sunni's image on the album cover. At an autograph signing, Sunni refuses to sing in public, which leads to news reports stating that she might have never had the talent or voice to perform her songs. Golden is insulted and furious with Sunni. During a performance, Deacon tells Sunni that she was being used.

Deacon later warns Levitt the charades are over. Levitt then manipulates Buddo into stealing the tracks recorded by Maggie and using them for Sunni's live concert, after which Deacon intends to end the charade for good. Deacon and Skeesix apologize to Maggie, with Deacon admitting that Buddo stole the recordings under Levitt's direction because Maggie would not sing and Deacon refused, giving Levitt those recordings.

Maggie, Skeesix and Deacon arrive at Sunni's concert. Maggie and Deacon infiltrate the room wherein Buddo plans to use the tapes. Deacon and Buddo almost get into an argument over the stolen recordings. Deacon calls for Buddo to do what's right. Mid-concert, Buddo cuts off Sunni's microphone while she's lip-syncing. Deacon and Buddo make Sunni sing with her own voice, exposing her lack of talent. Maggie reveals herself as the real voice behind Sunni's songs.

== Cast ==
- Kari Wuhrer as Sunni
- Gail O'Grady as Maggie Stanley
- Peter Outerbridge as Roger Deacon
- Harvey Atkin as Sidney Golden
- Isabelle Fink as Sadie

== Production ==
Plans to create the film were first announced via Variety in March 2000. The script was written by Eric Williams and Richard Schenkman. Kari Wuhrer and Peter Outerbridge were brought on to portray two of the film's central characters. Michael Larkin of VH1 noted that the film was to be "our take on the Milli Vanilli controversy" and would feature original music.

== Release ==
The film was released on VH1 on July 12, 2000, under a rating of TV-14.

== Reception ==
In a negative review, David Bianculli of the Fort Worth Star-Telegram wrote, "One problem is that, after that premise, every frame of this telemovie is predictable. The more serious problem is suspension of disbelief: O'Grady is so beautiful in her own right that the 'image is everything' argument bears no weight." VideoHound rated the film 2.5 bones.

Phil Gallo of Variety was also critical, calling it a "joke-free "music-filled comedy" that mindlessly romps through the cliches of soap operas, the record industry and network movies of the week."
