= William Fruet =

Canadian film and television director, playwright and screenwriter

- Born: January 1, 1933 (age 93); Lethbridge, Alberta, Canada
- Occupations: Film director, screenwriter, playwright
- Years active: 1963–present

William Fruet (born January 1, 1933) is a Canadian film and television director, playwright and screenwriter. He made his directorial debut with the drama Wedding in White (1972), based on a play he had also written. The film won Best Picture at the Canadian Film Awards in 1973.

His later career included several horror films, including Death Weekend (1976), Cries in the Night (1980), and Killer Party (1986), as well as television series, including Goosebumps and Poltergeist: The Legacy. Other writing credits include the influential Canadian film Goin' Down the Road, which he co-wrote with Donald Shebib.

== Early life and education ==
Fruet was born in Lethbridge, Alberta, and graduated from the National Theatre School of Canada in 1952. He worked for the CBC as an actor and photographer. He appeared Drylanders (1963), the National Film Board’s first English-language feature film. Between 1962 and 1963, Fruet studied directing at the UCLA School of Theater, Film and Television, and worked as an industrial filmmaker.

== Career ==
Fruet began his filmmaking career in Canada after meeting fellow UCLA alumnus Donald Shebib at the CBC. He wrote the screenplay for Shebib's Goin' Down the Road (1970), which was a critical and commercial success and is considered a landmark Canadian film. This film has been designated and preserved as a "masterwork" by the Audio-Visual Preservation Trust of Canada. His other screenwriting credits include Rip-Off (directed by Shebib) and Slipstream.

His directorial debut was the 1972 film Wedding in White. Based on Fruet's play of the same name, the film stars Carol Kane as a teenager in rural Ontario during World War II, who is forced to marry an older man after she is raped by a friend of her brother. The play and film was based on a real woman Fruet met in his youth, who had been forced to marry an older man by her parents in the same circumstances. The film received critical acclaim, and won Best Motion Picture at the 24th Canadian Film Awards.

Fruet's subsequent film directing credits include Death Weekend, Spasms, Search and Destroy, Killer Party, Cries in the Night and Bedroom Eyes. Several of his films have become cult classics among fans of the horror film genre.

His television credits include episodes of The Ray Bradbury Theatre, My Secret Identity, Diamonds, Alfred Hitchcock Presents, Friday the 13th, War of the Worlds, Counterstrike, The Outer Limits, Goosebumps, Poltergeist: The Legacy, The Zack Files, Da Vinci's Inquest, Chasing Rainbows, Code Name: Eternity and Zoe Busiek: Wild Card. He co-created the television series Code Name: Eternity.

== Filmography ==
Film

Year	Title	Notes
1972	Wedding in White	Canadian Film Award - Best Picture
1976	Death Weekend	Also known as: The House by the Lake
1979	Search and Destroy	
1980	Cries in the Night	Also known as: Funeral Home
1982	Trapped	Also known as: Baker County, U.S.A
1983	Spasms	
1984	Bedroom Eyes	
1986	Killer Party	
1987	Blue Monkey	
2000	Dear America: A Line in the Sand	Short film

TV series

Year	Title	Notes
1979	One of Our Own	
1987–1990	Friday's Curse	10 episodes
1988	Chasing Rainbows	
1988	Alfred Hitchcock Presents	Episode: "If Looks Could Kill"
1988–1990	War of the Worlds	8 episodes
1990	My Secret Identity	Episode: "David's Dream"
1990–1993	Top Cops	4 episodes
1990–1993	Counterstrike	4 episodes
1995	Mysterious Island	4 episodes
1995	The Outer Limits	Episode: "Birthright"
1995–1996	Lonesome Dove: The Outlaw Years	2 episodes
1995–1998	Goosebumps	27 episodes
1998	Animorphs	2 episodes
1998–2003	Da Vinci's Inquest	2 episodes
1997–1999	Poltergeist: The Legacy	6 episodes
2000	Code Name: Eternity	4 episodes
2000–2002	The Zack Files	10 episodes
2001–2002	Tracker	3 episodes

TV movies

- Brothers by Choice (1986)
- The Royal Diaries: Isabel - Jewel of Castilla (2000)
- Imaginary Playmate (2006)
- The Egg Factory (2008)
- Matty Hanson and the Invisibility Ray (2011)
