= Mr. Patman =

- UK VHS cover with the film's alternative title: Crossover
- Directed by: John Guillermin
- Written by: Thomas Hedley
- Produced by: Bill Marshall; Henk Van der Kolk
- Starring: James Coburn; Kate Nelligan; Fionnula Flanagan
- Cinematography: John Coquillon
- Edited by: Vince Hatherley; David Nicholson
- Music by: Paul Hoffert
- Production company: Film Consortium of Canada
- Distributed by: Jensen Farley Pictures
- Release date: 5 September 1980 (Toronto Film Festival)
- Running time: 97 minutes
- Country: Canada
- Language: English
- Budget: $6.9 million

Mr. Patman (also known as Crossover) is a 1980 Canadian film directed by John Guillermin and starring James Coburn.

== Plot ==
Patman, a nurse working the night shift in a psycho ward begins to lose his grip on reality.

== Cast ==
- James Coburn as Patman
- Kate Nelligan as Peabody
- Fionnuala Flanagan as Abadaba
- Les Carlson as Abernathy
- Candy Kane as Mrs Beckman
- Michael Kirby as Dr Turley
- Alan Mcrae as Dr Bloom
- Jan Rubeš as Vrakatas
- Hugh Webster as Wolfe
- Lynne Griffin as Monica
- Tabitha Herrington as Montgomery
- David L. Crowley as Orderly
- Lois Maxwell

== Production ==
Philip Hersh originally wrote the film's script, but was rewritten by Thomas Hedley, later famous for writing Flashdance. In May 1977, James Coburn was attached to the project with John Huston as director. John Guillermin, the director of The Towering Inferno and King Kong, was selected to direct the film. Karen Black received $62,500 after winning a lawsuit against Bill Marshall, the film's producer, for violating a verbal commitment to hire her.

The film was shot from 3 December 1979 to 6 February 1980, in Vancouver on a budget of $6,900,000 (equivalent to $25,749,545 in 2025), with $500,000 coming from the Canadian Film Development Corporation. 1,379 shares in the film were offered at $5,000 by Merrill Lynch.

The film went through multiple names during its development. The film went under the title Midnight Matinee, The Bed Next To Mine, Man In White, The Optimist, and Patman during production and was released under the titles Crossover and Mr. Patman. Vince Hatherley's edit of the film was 111 minutes, but David Nicholson reduced the runtime to 97 minutes. Guillermin was critical of the changing names of the film.

It was one of five films Coburn made over an 18-month period. "Something happened between the first script and the final re-write," he says of Mr. Patman. "In being made clearer, the film lost a lot of its charm and character. But the idea of a guy who works in a psychiatric ward, ultimately choosing to live in the madness there rather than the madness in the outside world, really appealed to me."

Kate Nelligan was Canadian, though based in New York where she had achieved great stage success. She agreed to return home to make the movie and help the film be classified as Canadian. Nelligan later called the movie a nightmare, saying in 1983 that "The Canadian film industry is a joke, and we Canadians should be ashamed of it. We passed a silly law to keep out American film professionals, from whom we might have learned something, and to assure that every incompetent film person in Canada could have a job. What we got were horribly incompetent people in top jobs, drunk most of the time, who went to Hollywood and got completely taken in by every agent in town, and in turn screwed every dentist in Canada out of $5,000 in tax-shelter investments. The boom seems to be over now. It was such a monstrous waste of time and money. I can say all that stuff, of course, because I'm Canadian."

== Release ==
The film was released in Paris on 22 April 1981, but never received a theatrical release in Canada and was instead aired by the Canadian Broadcasting Corporation on 5 November. The CBC paid around $600,000 for Circle of Two, Wild Horse Hank, and Mr. Patman. The film was shown at the 1980 Toronto Film Festival.

The Canadian Imperial Bank of Commerce took control of the film and sought to distribute it.

== Reception ==
Fred Haeseker, writing in Calgary Herald, stated that "If Mr. Patman is a flawed picture, though, it must be counted as an honorable failure: Among the hackneyed, exploitative English-language Canadian films released this year it stands out as a truly serious movie."

Reviewing it at the Toronto Film Festival, The Globe and Mail called the film "an honorable failure, honorable because its ambitions are lofty, and a failure because the ambitions are not tied to anything cinematically coherent - if Mr. Patman were literature, it would be a haiku unconscionably puffed into a short story. As a movie, it's a fragile featurette turned into an attenuated feature. Certainly it's good to want to say something, as Mr. Patman clearly does; it's even better to have something to say."

Maclean's said "just when Mr. Patman threatens to turn too heartwarming, it holds back and we respond to it without that put-upon feeling that we’re being coaxed into caring. It’s a thin line to tread but the director, John Guillermin... keeps a tight grip on the material, and the material has been shrewdly arranged, motifs and all, to tear your heart out."

An article in the Toronto Star from 2001 said "This notable dud was a product of Canada's notorious tax-shelter era when movies were for business write-offs rather than any creative imperative. Shot in Vancouver, it never lets the audience know where we are. A feeble echo of One Flew Over The Cuckoo's Nest, the movie had a British director (John Guillermin) and an American star (James Coburn). The screenwriter took his name off it after a dispute with producer Bill Marshall (one of the festival's founders). The movie had a gala slot at the 1980 festival, followed by a quick burial."

FilmInk later called it "a really terrible movie, dull and lacking in atmosphere, the first bad picture Guillermin made in over a decade."

== Accolades ==
Award	Date of ceremony	Category	Recipient(s)	Result	Ref.
Film Craft Awards	1980	Best Sound Editing	Peter Thillaye	Won	

== Works cited ==
- Knelman, Martin (1987). Home Movies: Tales from the Canadian Film World. Key Porter Books. ISBN 1550130498.
- Spencer, Michael (2003). Hollywood North: Creating the Canadian Motion Picture Industry. Cantos International Publishing. ISBN 289594007X.
- Turner, D. John, ed. (1987). Canadian Feature Film Index: 1913-1985. Canadian Film Institute. ISBN 0660533642.
