= Helga Stephenson =

Canadian film industry executive

Helga Stephenson OC OOnt
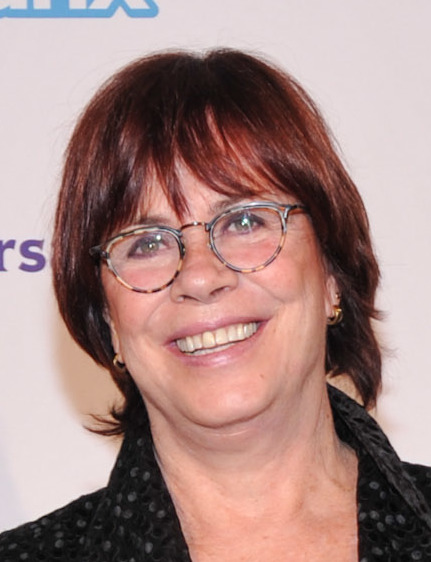
- Stephenson in 2015
- Born: Montreal, Quebec, Canada
- Occupations: Film executive, publicist

Helga Stephenson is a Canadian film industry executive, who was CEO of the Academy of Canadian Cinema and Television from 2011 to 2016. He was made a member of the Order of Ontario in 2016.

== Background ==
Stephenson was born and raised in Montreal, Quebec. Her aunt was Signy Stefansson Eaton. She studied film and communications at McGill University, graduating in 1969, and worked internationally for some time before joining the National Arts Centre as a publicist.

== Career ==
=== Festival of Festivals ===
She worked in Toronto as a partner in a film and television publicity agency, before joining the Toronto Festival of Festivals in 1978. In 1980, she was co-producer with Henk Van der Kolk and Bill Marshall of Hank Williams: The Show He Never Gave.

In 1982, she was promoted to communications director of the festival.

In September 1986 she was appointed interim director of the festival after the board dismissed Leonard Schein, and she was named the permanent new director in December. She remained in the role until 1994, when she stepped down and was succeeded by Piers Handling. Her term as director of the festival was widely credited with securing its contemporary reputation as one of the world's most prestigious film festivals.

=== Other activities ===
She then became chair of Viacom Canada, and was an on-air host of film-related programming for Showcase. She remained with Showcase until 1996, and with Viacom until 2000.

In the 2000s, Stephenson and Kate Alexander Daniels launched the public relations firm Daniels Stephenson, which handled film publicity and produced the Toronto Film Critics Association Awards. She also co-founded the Human Rights Watch International Film Festival with Brenda Dinnick.

=== Academy of Canadian Cinema and Television ===
Stephenson was named interim CEO of the Academy of Canadian Cinema and Television in 2011, and was confirmed in the position in 2012. In the position, she implemented changes to the Academy's board structure and media relations strategies in response to widespread dissatisfaction with the Academy among members, and spearheaded the merger of the Genie Awards and the Gemini Awards into the Canadian Screen Awards.

She stepped down as CEO of the Academy in 2016, and was succeeded by Beth Janson.
