= Beth Janson =

Canadian film industry executive

- Born: Montreal, Quebec, Canada
- Education: York University
- Occupations: Film industry executive, film festival programmer
- Spouse: Bill Ohlson (m. 2001)

Beth Janson is a Canadian film industry studio executive who was formerly chief operating officer of the Toronto International Film Festival. She was the chief executive officer of the Academy of Canadian Cinema and Television from 2016 to 2022. Originally from Montreal, Quebec, she graduated from York University.

After graduation, Janson moved to New York City. While living in New York, Janson worked as a programmer for the Tribeca Film Festival and then served as executive director of the Tribeca Film Institute from 2010 to 2015. She then joined Rent the Runway as founding director of its program to support women starting their own businesses.

She succeeded Helga Stephenson as chair of the Academy of Canadian Cinema and Television in June 2016. After she left the organization in 2022, she was succeeded by Tammy Frick. She was appointed chief operating officer of the Toronto International Film Festival in April 2022.

In August 2023, Janson stepped down from her role at TIFF and started a career as a consultant.
