= Circle of Two =

1980 film by Jules Dassin

- Directed by: Jules Dassin
- Written by: Thomas Hedley
- Based on: A Lesson In Love by Marie-Térèse Baird
- Produced by: Henk Van der Kolk
- Starring: Richard Burton; Tatum O'Neal; Michael Wincott; Kate Reid
- Cinematography: Lazlo George
- Edited by: David Nicholson
- Music by: Paul Hoffert; Bernard Hoffer
- Production company: Film Consortium of Canada
- Release date: 7 May 1981
- Running time: 105 minutes
- Language: English
- Budget: $5.7 million

Circle of Two is a 1981 Canadian drama film starring Richard Burton and Tatum O'Neal. It was the last film directed by acclaimed film noir director Jules Dassin.

== Plot ==
A 60-year-old artist, who has lost his inspiration when his muse left him 10 years previously, regains it when he falls in love with a sixteen-year-old.

== Cast ==
- Richard Burton - Ashley St. Clair
- Tatum O'Neal - Sarah Norton
- Nuala Fitzgerald - Claudia Aldrich
- Robin Gammell - Mr. Norton
- Patricia Collins - Mrs. Norton
- Kate Reid - Dr. Reed
- Michael Wincott - Paul

== Production ==
570 shares in the film were sold at $10,000 to 426 people to finance its $5.7 million budget. Merrill Lynch earned $456,000 from the commissions for the investment sales. It was estimated that the film needed to make $8–15 million to break-even.

Richard Burton was paid $750,000 to appear in the film. Thomas Hedley adapted Marie-Térèse Baird's book A Lesson In Love. The film was shot from 27 August to 3 November 1979. The film was mostly shot in Toronto, but three days were spent in New York and two days in Antigua. The film was 105 minutes long with a score by Paul Hoffert, but was later recut to 98 minutes with a new score by Bernard Hoffer.

Burton wanted his dog to be given a first class seat while flying on Air Canada to shooting in New York. Melina Mercouri, the wife of director Jules Dassin, also wanted to take her dog. A different airline was used.

Tatum O'Neal - fifteen at the time of filming - appears topless in one scene. She stated that her nude scene "was a mistake" and that she would never do one again. In her autobiography, A Paper Life, O'Neal stated that the "premise of the movie was a little pedophilic and creepy, but the worst part for me was having to do a seminude scene. It's agonizing to watch-- this awkward young girl disrobing for the artist in his studio. Even from the back, my body language shows that they'd forced me to take my shirt off-- at least it's obvious to me-- and that I'm standing there miserably aware of my half-developed breasts."

== Release ==
The film was released in London on 7 May 1981, and shown by the Canadian Broadcasting Corporation on 31 March 1983. World Northal distributed the film in the United States. The CBC paid around $600,000 for Circle of Two, Wild Horse Hank, and Mr. Patman. John Crabb, one of the investors who filed a lawsuit, claimed that the film earned $190,000 from its Canadian television distribution rights and $150,000 for its American distribution rights although that money had not been collected.

Securities commissions in Ontario and Quebec issued a cease-trading order against Circle of Two in September 1982. On 25 August 1983, 240 of the film's investors filed a lawsuit in the Supreme Court of Ontario and sought $34 million. Additional lawsuits were filed by other investors before a settlement was offered in 1987.

== Critical reception ==
Circle of Two received mostly negative reviews at the time of its release. Terry Kelleher, writing in the Miami Herald, gave the film one star out of four stating that it "lives down to expectations" and was critical of its cinematography and Burton's performance. Leonard Maltin's Movie Guide states that "Burton is OK, and Dassin does not go for the cheap thrill, but the result is slight and forgettable."

From People magazine's "Picks and Pans Review":

Richard Burton has carried a film or two in his day, and he tries to tote this one along. Burton, 56, plays a Toronto artist whose muse and passion are revived by a liaison with Tatum O’Neal, 18, a schoolgirl who wants to be a writer. The premise is within reason, if barely. It’s harder to accept the obnoxious supporting characters—her parents and friends, his art world associates—and the actors who play them quite badly. Jules (Never on Sunday) Dassin’s direction and Thomas Hedley’s script are strained too. At one point O’Neal goes on a hunger strike when her parents won’t let her see Burton. “That old gentleman happens to mean more to me than anything else,” she wails. “The next time I eat, it will be with him.” While she’s a decent actress, O’Neal hardly seems attractive enough for the role, even though she records her first nude scene. Burton, meanwhile, gentlemanly underacts, yet his glances and monosyllables are so much more interesting than the rest of the movie they become a form of upstaging.

In his review of Chris Williams' "The Richard Burton Diaries" for Commentary, critic Terry Teachout wrote that the film was considered a low point in Burton's long, once-esteemed career:

As Burton grew older, his roles, with few exceptions, grew tawdrier, and he became known, like Laurence Olivier, for his willingness to do anything for money. He stooped so low in 1981 as to appear in Jules Dassin’s Circle of Two, in which he plays a 60-year-old artist who falls for the 16-year-old Tatum O’Neal. By the time of his death three years later, his artistic reputation was in tatters.

== Works cited ==
- Turner, D. John, ed. (1987). Canadian Feature Film Index: 1913-1985. Canadian Film Institute. ISBN 0660533642.
- Knelman, Martin (1987). Home Movies: Tales from the Canadian Film World. Key Porter Books. ISBN 1550130498.
- Munn, Michael (2008). Richard Burton: Prince of Players. Skyhorse Publishing. ISBN 9781602393554.
