= The Tragedy of Flight 103: The Inside Story =

1990 film by Leslie Woodhead

- VHS cover art
- Genre: Docudrama
- Written by: Michael Eaton
- Directed by: Leslie Woodhead
- Starring: Ned Beatty; Peter Boyle; Vincent Gardenia; Timothy West; Michael Wincott
- Composer: Carl Davis
- Countries of origin: United States; United Kingdom
- Original language: English

Production
- Producer: Leslie Woodhead
- Cinematography: Ken Westbury
- Editor: Edward Mansell
- Running time: 86 minutes
- Production companies: HBO Showcase; Granada Television

Original release
- Network: ITV; HBO
- Release: November 26, 1990

The Tragedy of Flight 103: The Inside Story is a 1990 television drama film directed by Leslie Woodhead, written by Michael Eaton, and starring Ned Beatty, Peter Boyle, Harry Ditson, Vincent Gardenia, Timothy West and Michael Wincott. The film is about the bombing of Pan Am Flight 103 over Lockerbie, Scotland in 1988. It premiered in the United Kingdom on ITV on November 26, 1990, and in the United States on HBO on December 9, 1990.

== Plot ==
Yossi Langotsky packs a fake bomb in a suitcase and attempts to check in for a Pan Am flight only to find out that he is late. However, the check in officer accepts an under-the-table payment bribe to allow Langotsky's suitcase to be checked in. Once the suitcase is loaded, Langotsky calls Pan Am CEO Edward Acker to inform him of the fake bomb being placed onto one of the flights. Acker informs him that he doesn't want this incident to happen again and that it is not the right way to question security procedures on airlines.

At the Pan Am headquarters in New York, Acker meets with his high-ranking executives, one of them being the new vice-president for aviation security Frederick Ford, and reveals a plan to make Pan Am the safest and reliable airline, with its new security subsidiary named "Alert". Ford, who is to head "Alert", proposes changes with some of their elements by adding new ones based on El Al's security but is rebuffed by other executives, who plan to do it the American way as Pan Am is an American airline. Ford and Harry Pizer later discuss the trainings for Alert, with the former planning to hire British military officer Col. Wilfred Wood to help with the program.

== Cast ==
- Ned Beatty as Edward C. Acker
- Peter Boyle as Fred Ford
- Harry Ditson as Martin Shugrue
- Vincent Gardenia as Harry Pizer
- Timothy West as Colonel Wilfred Wood
- Michael Wincott as Ulrich Weber
- Sean Pertwee as Oliver Koch
- Richard Howard as Berndt Meyer
- Michael Cronin as Martin Hübner
- Stephen Hoye as Tommy Dome
- Emma Martin as Beate Franzki
- Sasson Gabai as Marwan Khreesat
- Aharon Ipalé as Hafez Dalkomoni
- Tony Alleff as Abdel Fatteh Ghadanfar
- Tariq Alibai as Abu Talb
- Cherif Ezzeldin as Saleem
- Colin Stinton as Raymond Smith
- Garrick Hagon as Mark Sanna
- Mozaffar Shafeie as Ali Akbar Mohteshemi
- William Roberts as Captain Jim McQuarrie
- Andrew Robertson as ATC Alan Topp
- Moshe Ivgy as Yossi Langotsky
