= Judy Lung =

Canadian film festival executive

- Lung in 2026
- Born: Canada
- Occupation: Film festival executive
- Employer: Toronto International Film Festival

Judy Lung is a Canadian film festival executive. As of 2026, she is the Vice President of Strategy, Communications, and Stakeholder Relations at the Toronto International Film Festival.

== Early life ==
Lung grew up in Smithville, Ontario. In her last year of high school, she took a media studies class, which spurred her interest in the entertainment industry thereafter.

== Career ==
Lung has worked in the Canadian entertainment industry since the 2000s, including serving as the Director of Communications at Cineplex and the Vice President of Communications and Marketing at Touchwood PR, as well as working on public relations and communications for films like David Cronenberg's Crimes of the Future and Shasha Nakhai and Rich Williamson's Scarborough.

In June 2023, Lung joined the executive team of the Toronto International Film Festival as the Vice President of Public Relations and Communications.

Lung has also served on the board of BIPOC TV & Film, where she helped launch the HireBIPOC database.
