= Thomas Hedley =

British magazine editor and screenwriter

- Born: 1942 or 1943 (age 83–84); Rugby, Warwickshire, England
- Occupations: magazine editor and screenwriter
- Spouse: Lisa Abelow Hedley
- Children: 4
- Relatives: Robert Mnuchin (father-in-law); Steven Mnuchin (brother-in-law)

Thomas Hedley Jr. (born 1942 or 1943) is a British magazine editor and screenwriter. The former publisher of Duckworth in London is President and Publisher of Hedley Media Group in New York City. As a young editor of Esquire, he edited and published essays by Federico Fellini, François Truffaut, Michelangelo Antonioni and Andy Warhol, among others. A fascination with film led to a number of written and produced screenplays including: Circle of Two, directed by Jules Dassin, Mr. Patman, Double Negative, Fighting Back and most notably, Flashdance. He has written screenplays for Barbra Streisand, Michael Jackson, Jean-Paul Goude and Sean Penn, among others.

== Early life ==
Hedley was born in England, the son of a Canadian military father and his English wife, and was educated at the University of Winnipeg.

== Career ==
- As editor-in-chief of Toronto Life, Hedley turned it into the “magazine of the year” and published, among others, Margaret Atwood, Leonard Cohen, Robertson Davies and won the national magazine award for a short story by Alice Munro.
- Hedley was the youngest ever editor of Esquire working for Harold Hayes in New York. During his tenure, he worked with writers and artists of the time including Tom Wolfe, Michael Herr, Diane Arbus, Jean Genet, William S. Burroughs, Gay Talese and Robert Coover. He produced a number of cover-sections including The Decline and Fall of the American Avant Garde in which he commissioned a play by Sam Shepard that was eventually performed at Lincoln Center, Claes Oldenburg’s last happening and a photographic essay on The New Theater by Andy Warhol. He commissioned and published essays by Federico Fellini, François Truffaut, and Michelangelo Antonioni, among others, and asked the directors to direct their own self-portraits.
- He produced and directed four documentaries for the CBC’s flagship current affairs program and wrote a number of produced screenplays including Circle of Two, Mr. Patman, Double Negative, Fighting Back, and Flashdance.
- He recently finished a two-year period in London as Publisher of Duckworth, the 105-year-old publishers of Virginia Woolf and D. H. Lawrence. He created a new imprint called Duck Editions, which book awards and books-of-the-year status in the leading British journals and newspapers.

== Personal life ==
He is married to Lisa Abelow Hedley, the step-daughter of banker turned art dealer, Robert Mnuchin (daughter of his second wife Adriana Mnuchin). Her step-brother is United States Secretary of the Treasury-designate, Steven Mnuchin. Lisa Hedley has been nominated for an Emmy award for documentary film. They have four children, and live in Palm Beach, Florida.
