= Henk Van der Kolk =

Canadian film producer

Henk Van der Kolk is a Canadian film producer, best known as a co-founder of the Toronto International Film Festival and the Academy of Canadian Cinema and Television.

Originally from Zwolle, Netherlands, Van der Kolk emigrated to Canada in 1959. His credits as a film producer include Outrageous! (1977), Wild Horse Hank (1979), Mr. Patman (1980), Hank Williams: The Show He Never Gave (1980) and Circle of Two (1981). Most of the films were co-produced with Bill Marshall through their firm Film Consortium of Canada.

Van der Kolk was a founder of the International Film Festival of Panama in 2012. He and his wife Yanka Van der Kolk run Imaging & Photography, a professional portrait photography studio.
