= David L. Crowley =

Lebanese-born American film and television actor

- Born: Lebanon
- Occupations: Film and television actor
- Years active: 1979–2004

David L. Crowley is a Lebanese-born American film and television actor. He is best known for playing Deputy Shingleton in the 1982 film First Blood.

== Life and career ==
Crowley was born in Lebanon. He began his screen career in 1979, appearing in the film Up River. The next year, he appeared in the films Out of the Blue and Mr. Patman, and made his television debut in the CTV television series Huckleberry Finn and His Friends.

Later in his career, Crowley guest-starred in numerous television programs including MacGyver, Hill Street Blues, Dallas, Falcon Crest, Santa Barbara, Hardcastle and McCormick, Picket Fences, Hunter and Knots Landing, and played the recurring role of Michael Garibaldi's close friend Lou Welch in the first and second season of the space opera television series Babylon 5. He also appeared in films such as First Blood (as Deputy Shingleton), Cocktail, The Beverly Hillbillies, The Grey Fox and Unglued.

Crowley retired from acting in 2004, last appearing in the ABC legal drama television series The Practice.
