= The Three Roads =

First edition (publ. Knopf)

The Three Roads, published in 1948, was the fourth novel by Kenneth Millar, and the final one using his real name before he started writing detective novels, ultimately using his later pseudonym, Ross Macdonald. In its use of psychological motifs and a Californian setting, The Three Roads anticipates Macdonald's later fiction.

The 1980 movie Deadly Companion (alternatively Double Negative) was based on this novel.

== Plot ==
The book is divided into four sections titled Saturday, Sunday, Monday and Doomsday, of which the last of these takes up fully half the novel.

Bret Taylor, a naval officer during the Pacific War, married his wife Lorraine after knowing her only over a single overnight drinking binge while on shore leave. After more months on duty, ending when his ship was destroyed in a kamikaze attack, he returned home to find Lorraine freshly murdered in the home he bought for her but has never seen. The shock of the two events sends him into a mental lapse involving heavy memory loss and he spends nine months in a naval hospital in San Diego. All that time he was visited by the woman who had loved him in the period before his impulsive marriage, divorced Paula Pangborn, a successful Hollywood screenwriter who uses her maiden name of West.

As Bret's memory begins to return, he is released into Paula's care and they drive up to Los Angeles on the Monday. But since the mental specialist called in to help him, Dr Klifter, had given Bret the newspaper clippings relating to Lorraine's death, he has become obsessed with finding out who had killed her and strikes out on his own. He gets into a fight in the Golden Slipper Café, where Lorraine had been drinking on the night she died, and is taken home by Larry Miles to sleep off his hangover.

The next - and final - day, Bret comes to suspect that Miles had been Lorraine's murderer. It emerges eventually that Bret had discovered Miles in bed with Lorraine on his unannounced return and had killed her himself. Miles, knowing the truth, had been blackmailing Paula to keep the responsibility secret. Police break up the subsequent fight between the men and shoot Miles for resisting arrest. Fingerprint evidence proves that Miles was present in her home at the time of Lorraine’s murder, so that he is taken for the culprit, leaving Bret free to rejoin his faithful Paula.

== The novel ==
The Three Roads appeared from Alfred A. Knopf in 1948 under the author's real name of Kenneth Millar, although later reprints have used the pseudonym he adopted following the success of his detective novels, Ross Macdonald. In the UK the novel was first published by Cassel & Co in 1950, and there was also a French translation that year with the title La Boîte de Pandore (Gallimard, 1950). Other translations have included the Italian L'assassino di mia moglie (Mondadori 1963) and the Finnish Valheen pitkät jäljet (Book Studio 2001).

This was the first novel by Millar to be set in California, principally in San Diego and Los Angeles in this case. It also introduces "many of the psychosexual themes that lurk beneath the surface of the later novels", a characteristic of Alfred Hitchcock's films of that period too. But, rather than telling the unfolding story from the point of view of the protagonist, it is the only one of the author’s novels to use an omniscient narrator.

There were problems with the book from the start. The publisher found it too slow-paced and asked for revisions that took several months to accomplish. Eventually Millar cut out "10,000 good words", mostly from the first half of the book, and concentrated the action into four days. Some critics have blamed the unsatisfactory performance of The Three Roads on its uncertainty of aim, the endless psychiatric theorising that mars the suspense of detection. But one contemporary review saw the consequent slowing of pace as beneficial. The book is less violent on the surface than Millar's previous three novels, so that "the physical energy has turned inward…and become psychological energy powerful enough to lift his style…to a high and complex level and keep it there".

Certainly there is evidence of that heightening of style in, for the example, the description of Bret's waking with a hangover at the start of chapter 12, which teeters at first on the edge of redundant cliché before its transition into something more original: "He closed his eyes again, groping for the severed ends of his dreams. But the shadows of the dream evaded him, fleeing backward down the tunnel of sleep like insubstantial ghosts. Consciousness took hold of him like an obstetrical forceps and pulled him into life by the head. The pressure of reality clamped on his skull was painful and somehow humiliating. He sat up in bed to shake it off, but the pain and humiliation hung on." It was writing at this level that led to the later estimation of Macdonald as "the writer who elevated the hard-boiled private-eye novel to a 'literary' art form" through his use of imagery and allusion.
