= 1492: Conquest of Paradise =

1992 film directed by Ridley Scott

- North American theatrical release poster
- Directed by: Ridley Scott
- Written by: Roselyne Bosch
- Produced by: Alain Goldman; Ridley Scott
- Starring: Gérard Depardieu; Armand Assante; Sigourney Weaver
- Cinematography: Adrian Biddle
- Edited by: William M. Anderson; Françoise Bonnot; Les Healey; Armen Minasian; Deborah Zeitman
- Music by: Vangelis
- Production companies: Gaumont; Légende Entreprises; France 2 Cinéma; Due West; CYRK Films
- Distributed by: Gaumont (France); Lauren Films (Spain); Guild Film Distribution (United Kingdom)
- Release dates: 8 October 1992 (Spain); 12 October 1992 (France); 23 October 1992 (United Kingdom)
- Running time: 156 minutes
- Countries: France; Spain; United Kingdom
- Language: English
- Budget: $47 million
- Box office: $7.2 million (US) $59 million (global)

1492: Conquest of Paradise is a 1992 epic historical drama film directed by Ridley Scott and written by Roselyne Bosch. It stars Gérard Depardieu, Armand Assante, and Sigourney Weaver, and portrays the travels to the New World by the Spanish explorer Christopher Columbus and the effect this had on Indigenous peoples.

The film was released to celebrate the 500th anniversary of Columbus's voyage. It debuted less than two months after John Glen's film Christopher Columbus: The Discovery, often leading to confusion between the two. The film received mixed to negative reviews, with particular criticism aimed at its historical inaccuracy and dramatic quality. It was commercially unsuccessful in the United States, doing better at the box office in Europe.

== Plot ==
Aware that the world—‌covered mostly in apparently flat ocean—‌actually has a ball-shaped surface, Christopher Columbus lobbies for a trip westward to Asia, but lacks a crew and ship. The Catholic theologians at the University of Salamanca heavily disapprove of Columbus's plan, not being keen on ideas that go against the writings of Ptolemaeus. Columbus is approached by Martín Pinzón, a shipowner from Palos, who introduces him to the banker Santángel, to whom Queen Isabella I owes money. Columbus meets with the queen, who grants him his journey in exchange for his promise to bring back sufficient amounts of riches in gold.

Columbus deceives many crewmen by telling them that the voyage will only last seven weeks. Three ships pass. Nine weeks go by with no sign of land. The crew becomes restless and edges toward mutiny. He tries to reinvigorate them with an inspiring speech, coinciding with a fast wind, which goads the men to return to their duties. At night, Columbus notices mosquitoes on the deck, indicating that land is not far off. Suddenly, out of the mist they see the lush vegetation and sandy beaches of Guanahani.

The Europeans befriend the local natives, who show them gold they have collected. Columbus teaches one of them Spanish so that they are able to communicate. He then informs them that he will return to Spain, which will be followed by the arrival of many more Europeans. Columbus leaves behind a group to begin the colonisation of the Americas. Back in Spain, he receives a high honour from the queen and has dinner with the council. They express disappointment with the small amount of gold he brought back, but the queen approves of his gifts. On the second expedition, Columbus takes 17 ships and over 1,000 men with him to the island; however, all the crewmen left behind are found to have been killed. When the tribe is confronted by Columbus and his troops, they tell him that another tribe came and killed them. Columbus chooses to believe them, but his arrogant aristocratic subordinate Moxica is not convinced. They begin to build the city of La Isabela and eventually manage to hoist the town bell into its tower.

Four years later, the natives are being forced to mine for gold. Moxica punishes one who fails to find any gold by cutting off his hand. The word of this act of violence spreads throughout the native tribes and they all disappear into the forest. Columbus begins to worry about a potential war, with the natives heavily outnumbering them. Upon return to his home, he finds his house set ablaze by Moxica and his followers, confirming his unpopularity among a certain faction of the settlers. Soon, the tribes arrive to fight the Spaniards and the island becomes war-torn. The settlers fight among themselves; Columbus' faction eventually prevails over Moxica's. Rather than be captured, Moxica commits suicide. Columbus' governorship is reassigned with orders for him to return to Spain.

Columbus is accused of nepotism and offering administrative positions to his personal friends, thereby injuring the pride of the nobles such as Moxica; he is replaced by de Bobadilla. Columbus returns to Castile to be imprisoned, but is bailed out by his sons. When he is summoned by the queen, she is reluctantly convinced to allow him to make another voyage, with the proviso that he neither take his brothers nor return to the colonies. As an old man, Columbus is virtually forgotten in Spain, with the discovery of the New World being credited to Amerigo Vespucci. Columbus's son Ferdinand asks his father to tell him his story so he can transcribe it.

== Production ==
Principal photography ran from December 1991 to March 1992. The New World sequences were shot on the central Pacific coast of Costa Rica, in Puntarenas Province: Columbus's landfall and the settlement of La Isabela were staged on the beaches around Playa Herradura, Punta Leona and Jacó, where roughly ten sets were built. The production hired about 170 Indigenous Costa Ricans as extras to portray the Caribbean islanders, paying around $35 a day; a newly formed national film commission helped secure the country as a location. Other locations included the Dominican Republic, the U.S. Virgin Islands, Spain (Cáceres, Trujillo, Seville and Salamanca) and Pinewood Studios in England.

== Cast ==
- Gérard Depardieu as admiral Christopher Columbus
- Armand Assante as Gabriel Sánchez, Columbus's archrival in Castile
- Sigourney Weaver as Queen Isabella I
- Loren Dean as older Ferdinand Columbus
  - Billy L. Sullivan as younger Ferdinand
- Ángela Molina as Beatriz Enríquez de Arana
- Fernando Rey as Antonio de Marchena
- Michael Wincott as Adrián de Moxica, Columbus's archenemy in the Indies
- Tchéky Karyo as Martín Alonso Pinzón
- Kevin Dunn as Captain Méndez
- Frank Langella as Luis de Santángel
- Mark Margolis as Francisco de Bobadilla
- Kario Salem as de Arojaz
- John Heffernan as Brother Buyl
- Arnold Vosloo as Hernando de Guevara
- Steven Waddington as Bartholomew Columbus, brother of Christopher
- Fernando Guillén Cuervo as Giacomo Columbus, brother of Christopher
- José Luis Ferrer as Alonso de Bolaños
- Bercelio Moya as Utapán
- Juan Diego Botto as Diego Columbus
- Achero Mañas as Ship's Boy
- Fernando García Rimada as King Ferdinand V
- Albert Vidal as Hernando de Talavera
- Isabel Prinz as Dueña
- Jack Taylor as de Vicuña

== Music ==
The Greek composer Vangelis, who previously worked for Ridley Scott on Blade Runner (1982), composed the score. Its main theme, "Conquest of Paradise", was used by former Portuguese Prime Minister António Guterres at his 1995 election and it was used by the Portuguese Socialist Party as its campaign and rally anthem, although it was replaced by the main theme from Gladiator (2000), another Scott film, since the first José Sócrates legislative elections campaign. Despite the film's dismal box office intake in the United States, the film's score became a successful album worldwide.

Russia used it in the 2nd round of the 1996 Russian presidential election.

The theme is also used at the starting line of the Ultra-Trail du Mont-Blanc ultramarathon. German boxer Henry Maske, the IBF light heavyweight world champion from 1993 to 1996, used the theme as his entrance music, which helped make it a hit in Germany.

Other usages of the theme include New Zealand Super 15 Rugby franchise the Canterbury Crusaders, as they run onto the field, often accompanied by actors dressed as knights and riding on horseback, the Northampton Saints rugby team for their entrance into the Franklins Gardens stadium and rugby league team Wigan Warriors who play in the Super League, as well as being played before the start of every match in the 2010 and 2014 cricket World Twenty20 championships as well as the 2011 Cricket World Cup. In these events the theme was played right before the national anthems of the two competing nations, as the flags of the two nations were carried into the ground, accompanied by the players of the two teams.

The theme was also played in the Top Gear: US Special and became a signature piece for World Professional Champion figure skaters Anita Hartshorn and Frank Sweiding. In Lebanon it has been used almost at every wedding since its release until now, mostly used as starter music before the arrival of the bride and the groom.

== Reception ==
=== Box office ===
1492: Conquest of Paradise opened on 66 screens in Spain, grossing $1 million in its first five days ($2.3 million today). In the United States and Canada, it was released by Paramount Pictures on 9 October 1992 in 1,008 theaters. The version released there was edited to 150 minutes, with some violence and brutality removed in order to achieve a PG-13 rating. The film was a flop in the United States, debuting at number seven with a gross of $3,002,680 (about $6.9 million today), worse than the opening of Christopher Columbus: The Discovery earlier in the year, and went on to gross just $7 million ($16.1 million today). It opened in France on 12 October 1992, grossing $1.46 million for the weekend ($3.3 million today) from 264 screens. In its second week in Europe, it was the highest-grossing film with a gross of over $7.7 million ($17.7 million today), including $1.77 million in its opening week in Germany ($4.1 million today) from 213 screens. It did not open well in Italy, with only $261,800 in its opening weekend ($600,600 today) from 33 screens. By the end of 1992, it had grossed $40 million internationally ($91.8 million today),, including $17 million in France and €3 million in Spain, for a worldwide total of $47 million ($107.8 million today). It went on to gross $59 million ($135.4 million today).

Scott later blamed the film's U.S. failure on Americans not understanding European accents: "They don't hear shit unless it's from Texas or America, right?" and reflected: "It's one of my favorite films. What's interesting, they didn't know how to release it in America. But in Europe, it clocked $57 million." In 2024, he give a similar statement: "I'm very proud of 1492, with Gérard Depardieu. The problem with Gérard is he doesn't speak very good English and I didn't have the heart to say, 'Gérard we need to [re-record all your lines].' I'm trying to resurrect 1492 because it's so beautifully shot and acted and scored. I'm trying to resurrect it as a four-hour [movie] for a streaming platform. Now if I asked, 'Gérard, can we ADR you with Kenneth Branagh?' he'd probably say, 'Yeah, of course.'"

=== Critical response ===
Roger Ebert of the Chicago Sun-Times awarded the film three stars from four. He wrote that "Depardieu lends it gravity, the supporting performances are convincing, the locations are realistic, and we are inspired to reflect that it did indeed take a certain nerve to sail off into nowhere just because an orange was round." Desson Howe of The Washington Post said that "despite Scott's trademark, spectacular imagery, the story's dead in the water. Actually, there's no story. It's all eye-dizzying hyperbole, with astounding camerawork, fancy editing and a moody flamenco guitar-meets-synthesizer soundtrack by avant-garde musician Vangelis." A reviewer for Variety wrote that "Ridley Scott's vaunted visuals can't transform 1492 from a lumbering, one-dimensional historical fresco into the complex, ambiguous character study that it strives to be." Chris Hicks of the Salt Lake City-based Deseret News wrote that "Scott, the accomplished director of Alien, Blade Runner and Thelma & Louise, among others, has imbued this film with great visual style, and the sets, costumes and general atmosphere are fascinating. In fact, there is much to recommend on a technical level. But 1492 is, unfortunately, plagued with narrative problems that make it a less than successful cinematic voyage." Owen Gleiberman of Entertainment Weekly wrote that "at 2.5 hours, 1492 is even harder to sit through than last month’s schlock extravaganza Christopher Columbus: The Discovery. In each case the filmmakers have fallen into a similar trap. Out of some vague mixture of historical 'duty' and commercial myopia, they’ve presented Columbus as the same cardboard visionary we learned about in school. Whether or not that image has a core of truth, are there really many people who want to experience it all over again at the movies? Watching 1492 is about as exciting as doing your homework."

Overall, 1492: Conquest of Paradise received mixed to negative reviews from critics, with the review aggregator Rotten Tomatoes giving the film a 30% rating based on 23 reviews with the critical consensus: "Historically inaccurate and dramatically inert, Ridley Scott's retelling of Christopher Columbus' exploits is an epic without grandeur or insight". Metacritic, which uses a weighted average, assigned the film a score of 47 out of 100, based on 21 critics, indicating "mixed or average" reviews. Audiences surveyed by CinemaScore gave the film a grade of "B+" on scale of A+ to F.

The film was accused of promoting the Spanish black legend.

== See also ==
- Carry On Columbus, a comedy film about Columbus released in 1992
- The Magic Voyage, an animated film about Columbus also released in 1992
