= Adrián de Moxica =

Spanish nobleman (1453–1499)

Adrián de Moxica (de Múgica)
- Born: 1453; Spain
- Died: c. 1499 (aged 45–46); Hispaniola, Caribbean
- Occupations: Mariner, explorer, discoverer
- Years active: 1498–1499

Adrián de Moxica (also written as de Múgica) (1453 – c. 1499) was a Spanish nobleman and explorer.

Moxica was born to a Spanish noble family of Basque descent. In 1498 he accompanied Christopher Columbus on his third journey to the Americas, where he participated in the rebellion against Columbus in 1499 led by Francisco Roldán. Moxica was a noted participant in the rebellion, although the extent of his involvement and his role in the initiation of atrocities against the natives is uncertain. Although the rebellion was successful, de Moxica was arrested by Columbus' troops and hanged.

== In popular culture ==
Adrián de Moxica was portrayed by Michael Wincott in Ridley Scott's 1992 film 1492: Conquest of Paradise. Moxica fills a prominent role in the film as Columbus' nemesis, who assumes the role as the leader of Roldán's rebellion with his right-hand Hernando de Guevara (played by Arnold Vosloo). In the film, Moxica cuts off the hand of a Native American who claimed to have found no gold to pay for his taxes. Eventually, once confronted by both Columbus and his allies, he commits suicide by jumping off a steep cliff, rather than be captured.

== Sources ==
- Irving, Washington (1828). A History of the Life and Voyages of Christopher Columbus. London: John Murray.
