= Deadly Companion =

- The VHS artwork for Deadly Companion, falsely implying that John Candy plays a starring role in the film
- Directed by: George Bloomfield
- Written by: Thomas Hedley Jr. Charles Dennis
- Based on: The Three Roads by Ross Macdonald
- Produced by: Jerome S. Simon; David Main
- Starring: Michael Sarrazin; Susan Clark; Anthony Perkins; Howard Duff; Kate Reid; Al Waxman
- Cinematography: René Verzier
- Edited by: George Appleby
- Music by: Paul Hoffert
- Production company: Quadrant Films
- Distributed by: Quadrant Films
- Release date: May 12, 1980
- Running time: 96 minutes
- Country: Canada
- Language: English

Deadly Companion (also known as Double Negative) is a 1980 Canadian thriller film based on the novel The Three Roads by Ross Macdonald.

== Plot ==
Michael Taylor is tormented by his sheer lack of memory concerning the night his wife was found brutally killed. Michael's girlfriend Paula helps him attempt to make sense of it all.

== Cast ==
- Michael Sarrazin as Michael Taylor
- Susan Clark as Paula West
- Anthony Perkins as Lawrence Miles
- Howard Duff as Lester Harlen
- Kate Reid as Mrs. Swanscutt
- Al Waxman as Dellassandro
- Elizabeth Shepherd as Frances
- Kenneth Welsh as Dr. Klifter
- John Candy as John
- Michael Ironside as Edgar

== Production ==
A 1979 article in The Globe and Mail on the film's production revealed that the script process was chaotic, saying that the film was "directed by George Bloomfield from a script by three Toronto writers who have adapted a Ross McDonald novel. The cast is in turn adapting the work of the three writers. 'This is one of those things that's in progress,' Miss Clark says, plonking herself on the floor in the corridor, 'so it's a big question mark. The three writers seemed to be coming from three different places. We have improvised: the locations have stayed the same, and so has the intent of the individual scenes, but...'"

Bloomfield said that Anthony Perkins "had a ball" with his debauched character: "He brought a tremendous amount to it. I suspect that Tony was a person who had a very free-flowing fantasy life, which he drew on." Perkins came up with the idea of filming a sex scene with both characters wearing sunglasses in bed. Susan Clark said, "He was very alive and always able to find some quirk in the character. But the man himself was very private, very mischievous. He would throw a line one way in rehearsal — then do a different inflection to see if you were really listening during the take."

=== Casting ===
Anthony Perkins plays a blackmailer; Al Waxman, Maury Chaykin, Kenneth Welsh and Michael Ironside appear in minor roles.

Several cast members of the Canadian comedy show SCTV appear in this film, all playing small dramatic roles. (Director George Bloomfield had directed SCTV from 1977 through 1979, and brought the cast into the fold.) John Candy, Joe Flaherty, Eugene Levy, Catherine O'Hara, and Dave Thomas (his film debut) all have minor or bit parts; of the SCTV players, only O'Hara is in more than one scene, and Levy is visible for less than five seconds. A similar flock of SCTV cast members had small roles in Bloomfield's previous feature Nothing Personal, which was released just six weeks earlier than Deadly Companion.

== Release ==
Some later video releases of the film misleadingly give some or all of the SCTV cast top billing. In the actual film credits, no SCTV member is billed higher than 11th.

== Reception ==
Spies and Sleuths called the movie "a muddle film that cannot untie its tangled skein of a plot, although a Perkins performance is always worth watching."

Starburst wrote, "This convoluted thriller is not without its merits (not least some clever dialogue and well observed performances by, among others, Anthony Perkins.) The trouble is, Bloomfield has not learned from the brilliant Point Blank that an oblique, difficult narrative can be gripping (even if one is only gradually aware of what's going on) — here the effect is wearingly muddlesome."
