= Michael Wincott =

Canadian actor (born 1958)

- Born: Michael Anthony Claudio Wincott; January 21, 1958 (age 68); Toronto, Ontario, Canada
- Education: University of Toronto (BA); Juilliard School (GrDip)
- Occupation: Actor
- Years active: 1976–present
- Family: Jeff Wincott (brother)
- Website: michaelwincott.org

Michael Anthony Claudio Wincott (born January 21, 1958) is a Canadian actor. His deep, raspy voice has often led to his being cast in villainous roles.

Some of his best-known roles include Guy of Gisbourne in Robin Hood: Prince of Thieves (1991); Top Dollar, the main antagonist in The Crow (1994); music mogul Philo Gant in Strange Days (1995); mercenary Frank Elgyn in Alien Resurrection (1997); hacker Adrian Cross on the TV miniseries 24: Live Another Day (2014); and cinematographer Antlers Holst in Nope (2022). He has frequently worked with directors Oliver Stone and Julian Schnabel, and appeared in films by Ridley Scott, Terrence Malick, Michael Cimino and Jim Jarmusch.

== Early life and education ==
Wincott was born in Toronto and grew up in an east-end suburb. His father is English while his mother was from Piacenza, Italy. Wincott has two brothers, one of whom is actor and martial artist Jeff Wincott, a star of the late-1980s TV series Night Heat.

In a 2014 interview with L'Uomo Vogue, Wincott said he fell in love with cinema as a young child and took drama classes in high school. He was educated at the Victoria University, a college of the University of Toronto. In 1982, he enrolled at the Juilliard School in New York City, graduating in 1986. Wincott credited director Des McAnuff, as well as his father, with encouraging him to enroll at the prestigious acting school.

== Career ==
In 1976, Wincott starred in his first film, titled Earthbound, as Cole Buckley, a troubled teenager living in a small Saskatchewan town. Kate Reid and Gerard Parkes played his parents in the film. The film aired on CBC-TV's Front Row Centre series in January 1977.

In 1979, Wincott starred in the Canadian adventure drama film Wild Horse Hank. In 1981, he appeared in the Canadian drama film Circle of Two. He also appeared on two episodes of the Canadian TV Series, The Littlest Hobo in 1979 and 1981.

After graduating from Juilliard, Wincott was cast in the 1987 film, The Sicilian in the role of Corporal Silvestro Canio. That same year he was also cast in the Eric Bogosian play Talk Radio as a stoned heavy metal fan named Kent. The following year Wincott appeared in Oliver Stone's film based on the play. In the 1980s he appeared on such American TV series as Miami Vice, Crime Story and The Equalizer, as well as Canadian police drama series Night Heat—a series starring his brother Jeff.

Wincott's stage performances include the off-Broadway productions Road (1988) starring Joan Cusack and Kevin Bacon, and the Sam Shepard play, States of Shock (1991), starring John Malkovich. He appeared on Broadway starring in the play Serious Money (1988) alongside Kate Nelligan, Alec Baldwin and John Pankow, as well as appearing in The Secret Rapture (1989) starring Blair Brown.

Wincott again worked with Oliver Stone in 1989, appearing in the film Born on the Fourth of July as a bedridden Vietnam veteran, then yet again in 1991 in the film The Doors where he played the role of Paul Rothchild, the producer of The Doors' first five albums. In 1991, he played Guy of Gisborne in Robin Hood: Prince of Thieves.

In 1993, he appeared in the film Romeo Is Bleeding as Sal, a mafioso, and also played the part of Rochefort in the Disney film The Three Musketeers. The following year Wincott starred as kingpin Top Dollar opposite Brandon Lee in The Crow. In 1995, he appeared in Dead Man. He played poet Rene Ricard in the 1996 biographical film Basquiat. He also played the role of mercenary Frank Elgyn in the 1997 film Alien Resurrection.

Wincott starred as a psychopathic kidnapper opposite Morgan Freeman in the 2001 film Along Came a Spider. The following year he played Armand Dorleac, a sadistic prison warden in the 2002 film version of The Count of Monte Cristo starring Jim Caviezel. In 2004 he played Julius Bicke in The Assassination of Richard Nixon.

In 2006, Wincott appeared in the western film Seraphim Falls. He also appeared in The Diving Bell and the Butterfly and What Just Happened in 2007 and 2008 respectively.

In 2009, he starred in A Lonely Place for Dying as CIA project manager Anthony Greenglass. In early 2012, he was cast as notorious serial killer Ed Gein in the biographical drama film Hitchcock.

In 2014, Wincott played hacker Adrian Cross in the miniseries 24: Live Another Day. The following year he starred in the Canadian western drama film Forsaken. In 2016 he also played the role of Old Bill in two episodes in season 1 of the science fiction western TV series Westworld.

In 2017, he appeared in the MTG drama series Veni Vidi Vici. The Swedish series stars Danish actor Thomas Bo Larsen and centers around the porn industry. Wincott plays the part of Georgina, a transgender former porn director. Wincott starred in Jordan Peele's 2022 thriller, Nope, as Antlers Holst, a cinematographer. In preparation for the role, Wincott shadowed the film's director of photography, Hoyte van Hoytema.

Wincott has also lent his voice to several characters in video games and animated features: In 2002 he provided the voice of Scroop, a malevolent spider/crab-like creature in the Disney animated film Treasure Planet; and in the accompanying Sony PlayStation video game of the same name. In 2004 he provided the voice for the Prophet of Truth in the video game Halo 2. He also provided the voice of Mr. Big in the 2005 re-launch of the video game Narc. In 2012 he provided the voices for several video game characters: Jules Merit in the game Syndicate, Griffin in the interactive graphic novel Infex, and Death in the game Darksiders II.

== Filmography ==
=== Film ===
Year	Title	Role	Notes
1979	Title Shot	Robber	
1980	Nothing Personal	Peter	
1980	Wild Horse Hank	Charlie Connors	
1981	Ticket to Heaven	Gerry	
1981	Circle of Two	Paul	
1983	Curtains	Matthew	
1987	The Sicilian	Cpl. Silvestro Canio	
1988	Talk Radio	Kent/Michael/Joe	
1989	Suffering Bastards	Chazz	
1989	Bloodhounds of Broadway	Soupy Mike	
1989	Born on the Fourth of July	Veteran	
1991	The Doors	Paul A. Rothchild	
1991	Robin Hood: Prince of Thieves	Guy of Gisbourne	
1992	1492: Conquest of Paradise	Adrián de Moxica	
1993	Romeo Is Bleeding	Sal	
1993	The Three Musketeers	Rochefort	
1994	The Crow	Top Dollar	
1995	Dead Man	Conway Twill	
1995	Strange Days	Philo Gant	
1995	Panther	Tynan	
1996	Basquiat	Rene Ricard	
1996	Dead Girl	Mark in the Park	
1997	Alien Resurrection	Captain Frank Elgyn	
1997	Metro	Michael Korda	
1998	Gunshy	Frankie McGregor	
1999	Hidden Agenda	Larry Gleason	
2000	Before Night Falls	Herberto Zorilla Ochoa	
2001	Along Came a Spider	Gary Soneji	
2002	The Count of Monte Cristo	Armand Dorléac	
2002	Treasure Planet	Scroop	Voice
2004	The Assassination of Richard Nixon	Julius Bicke	
2006	Seraphim Falls	Hayes	
2007	The Diving Bell and the Butterfly	Fashion Photographer	
2008	What Just Happened	Jeremy Brunell	
2009	A Lonely Place for Dying	Anthony Greenglass	
2012	Hitchcock	Ed Gein	
2013	The Girl from Nagasaki	Goro	
2014	Grand Street	Reuben	
2015	Knight of Cups	Herb	
2015	Forsaken	Dave Turner	
2017	Ghost in the Shell	Dr. Osmond	Uncredited
2022	Nope	Antlers Holst	

=== Television ===
Year	Title	Role	Notes
1976	Earthbound	Cole Buckley	Television film directed by Mike Newell
1979	An American Christmas Carol	Choir Leader	Television film
1979	The Family Man	Charlie	Television film
1979–81	The Littlest Hobo	Charlie, Jeff	2 episodes
1981	Clown White	Peter	Television film
1985	Night Heat	Jack Tenelli	Episode: "Mother's Day"
1987–88	Crime Story	Bobby Meeker	3 episodes
1987	The Equalizer	Jordan	Episode: "High Performance"
1989	The Equalizer	Jarrow	Episode: "The Caper"
1988	Miami Vice	Wilson Cook	Episode: "Blood & Roses"
1990	The Tragedy of Flight 103: The Inside Story	Ulrich Weber	Television film
1996	Strangers	Arnaud	Episode: "Leave"
2002	The Red Phone: Manhunt	Hans Peter Van Eyck	Television film
2014	24: Live Another Day	Adrian Cross	8 episodes
2016	Westworld	Old Bill	2 episodes
2017	Veni Vidi Vici	Georgina	Series for Viaplay (Scandinavia) and Hulu (Australia and United States)

=== Self ===
Year	Title	Role	Notes
1993	The Making of The Three Musketeers	Himself	
2001	The Making of Along Came a Spider	Himself	
2005	Me and Graham: The Soundtrack of Our Lives	Himself	
2007	Behind the Scenes of Seraphim Falls	Himself	
2014	Jack is Back	Himself	The 'Making of' documentary
2016	The Making of Forsaken	Himself	

=== Short film ===
Year	Title	Role	Notes
2008	Sketches from Great Gull	Narrator	Voice
2011	The Iceman	Mr. Softee	Test scene for The Iceman (2012)
2011	The Farewell	He	

=== Video shorts ===
- The Treasure Planet Read-Along DVD (2003) – Scroop (voice)

=== Video games ===
Year	Title	Role	Notes
2002	Treasure Planet	Scroop	Voice
2004	Halo 2	The Prophet of Truth	Voice
2005	Narc	Mr. Big	Voice
2012	Infex	Griffin	Voice
2012	Syndicate	Jules Merit	Voice
2012	Darksiders II	Death	Voice

== Theatre ==
- 1987 – Talk Radio – Kent
- 1988 – Serious Money – Grevett, Frosby, Jake Todd
- 1988 – Road – Eddy, DJ, Skin Lad
- 1989 – The Secret Rapture – Irwin Posner
- 1991 – State of Shock – Stubbs
