= Marie-Térèse Baird =

British author

- Born: 16 April 1918; Antwerp, Belgium
- Died: April 2001 (aged 82–83); Reading, Berkshire
- Writing career
- Notable works: The Scorpions, A Lesson in Love (US) / A Shining Furrow (UK)

Marie-Térèse Baird was a Belgian-born British novelist. She is best-known for her 1973 novel A Lesson in Love (released in the UK as A Shining Furrow), upon which was based the 1981 film Circle of Two (also distributed under the title Obsession), directed by Jules Dassin and starring Richard Burton and Tatum O'Neal.

== Personal life ==
Marie-Térèse Verellen was born on 16 April 1918 in Antwerp, Belgium, where she attended convent schools. She married her second husband, Nigel Baird, and moved to Upper Woolhampton, Berkshire, England in 1939. She had eight children. She died in Reading, Berkshire, in April 2001, aged 82.

== Selected works ==
- The Scorpions. London: Macmillan. 1961.
- A Lesson in Love. Boston: Houghton Mifflin. 1973.
- A Shining Furrow. London: Collins. 1973. ISBN 978-0002218542.
- The Birds of Sadness. London: St. Martin’s Press. 1986. ISBN 9780709025771.
- The Honeysuckle and The Rose. London: Robert Hale. 1988. ISBN 9780709031178.

== Critical reception ==
Her first novel The Scorpions, was well received. A reviewer in The Sphere considered it "promising", saying that "Mrs. Baird has an easy, almost conversational style and considerable dexterity in the handling of her plot." Another reviewer described it as "very well trimmed and cultivated .... The portraits of the matriarch and her three daughters ... are brilliantly done." The journal English Studies included the book in a review of "Current Literature, 1961", explaining that the title of the novel relates to its epigraph, a quote from The Cambridge Natural History: 'After mating, the male scorpion is often devoured by the female.' The review provides a synopsis of the novel: "The setting is the Georgian country house of Charters .... the lives of all the inhabitants, and of those who are connected with it, are dominated by the womenfolk. ... Edith Winton-Browne, an intelligent and in many ways a likable person, exercises a strong influence over her daughters; and even her grandchildren come under her spell. None of them are normal personalities. We follow out the vicissitudes of their lives through the novel, but the chief interest of the story is in the love affair between Claire (one of the granddaughters) and Martin Stephens, a young Swiss-born Englishman living in London." The reviewer concludes "This is her first novel, and it is to be hoped that it will not be her last, for she is obviously a writer with great possibilities."

Baird's 1973 novel A Lesson in Love (released in the UK as The Shining Furrow) was the basis for the film Circle of Two, although Baird claimed that she did not receive a fee for it. The book had received mixed reviews. Martin Levin in The New York Times suggested that Baird's experience as a mother gave her the insight to create a convincing portrayal of her young protagonist in A Lesson in Love, Sarah: "Mrs. Baird, a mother of eight, does a pretty good job of characterizing nervy Sarah." The anonymous reviewer in Kirkus Reviews suggests that, in A Lesson in Love, Baird wrote an emotionally affecting story while avoiding some of the pitfalls of portraying the fleeting nature of an April December romance, "[I]t is a temporal business at best and, to Mrs. Baird's credit, she has avoided much of the gumminess the situation invites [...] Sentimentally it's susceptible stuff -- to be read with a catch in the throat." A review of the film, however, said "This was a book about which reviewers used words like 'wooden', 'unbelievable' and 'preposterous' ", and considered that the film "Circle of Two failed for reasons that were obvious from the outset. It was dull".

Reviews of Baird's other works also suggest that she keenly observed characters' unique points of view as shaped by their stages in life. Baird's later novel, The Birds of Sadness, was singled out from three other contemporary novels for how well Baird portrayed old age, "The most fully developed and most memorable evocation of the experience of being an old woman is Marie-Térèse Baird's The Birds of Sadness."
