= Piers Handling =

Film org. director

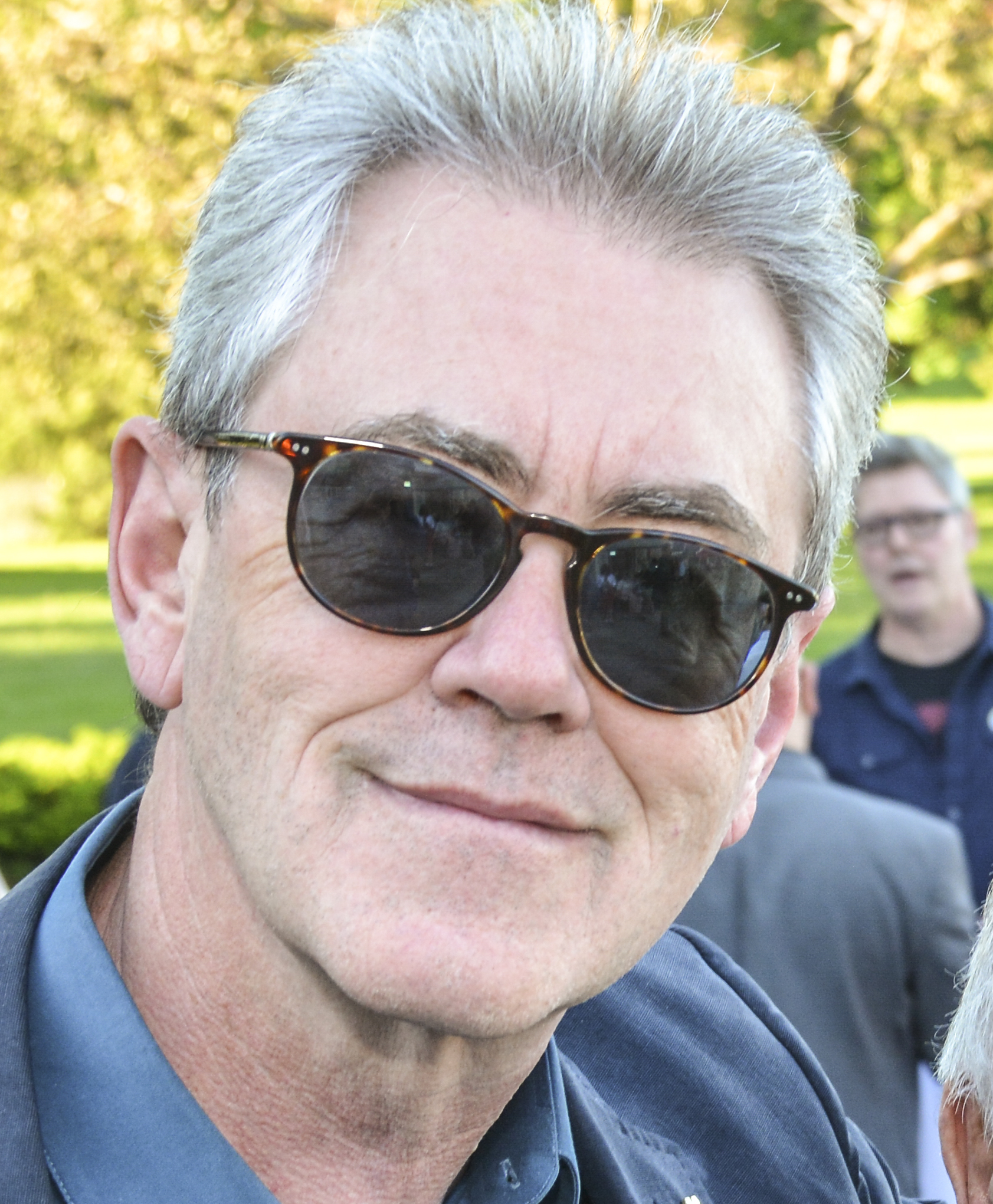
- Piers Handling at the 2017 CFC Annual Garden Party
- Born: 1949 (age 76–77)
- Occupation: CEO
- Years active: 1982–2018
- Known for: Toronto International Film Festival

Piers Handling (born 1949) is the former CEO and executive director of the Toronto International Film Festival, and former deputy director of the Canadian Film Institute.

== Early life ==
Piers was born to Joan Garrod and Douglas Handling, who met during World War II. He was born in Calgary, but raised on army bases throughout Europe.

Handling studied history at Queen's University, and began his film career at the Canadian Film Institute (CFI). He eventually became deputy director of the CFI.

After leaving the CFI, he taught Canadian cinema at Carleton University in Ottawa and Queen's University in Kingston.

He has received honorary degrees from Ryerson University, York University, OCAD University, University of Toronto, and Queen's University.

== Toronto International Film Festival ==
Handling joined the Toronto International Film Festival (TIFF) as a programmer in 1982, became programming director in 1988 after Helga Stephenson moved to executive director in 1987, and became CEO and executive director in 1994.

During his tenure, TIFF became one of the biggest film festivals in the world, with its own permanent downtown hub in TIFF Lightbox which screens films and holds various events year-round.

In 2003, Handling was named CEO of the Year by the Canadian Public Relations Society. Handling was succeeded by Joana Vicente in November 2018.

== Recognition ==
- Queen Elizabeth II Diamond Jubilee Medal, 2012
- Clyde Gilmour Award, 2014
- Order of Ontario, 2014
- Officer of the Order of Canada, 2017
- Business / Arts Peter Herrndorf Arts Leadership Award, 2017
- Officier des Arts et des Lettres, 2018
