= Murray Cohl =

Canadian film producer

Murray "Dusty" Cohl
- Born: February 21, 1929; Toronto, Ontario, Canada
- Died: January 11, 2008 (aged 78); Toronto, Ontario, Canada
- Occupation: Film producer
- Known for: Co-founding the Toronto International Film Festival and Canada's Walk of Fame

Murray "Dusty" Cohl (February 21, 1929 – January 11, 2008) was a Canadian film producer and co-founder of Toronto International Film Festival and Canada's Walk of Fame.

Murray Cohl was born in Toronto, Ontario, to Karl and Lillian Cohl in 1929. His father Karl was a communist who worked as a house painter in the city. Cohl attended Charles G. Fraser Elementary School and Camp Naivelt in Brampton from the age of five. He began a career as a real estate lawyer after graduating from Osgoode Hall Law School in 1954.

Cohl was invested into the Order of Canada in May 2003 for "his pride in Canadian talent" and his "desire to celebrate our achievements." He was diagnosed with liver cancer in late 2007. On January 11, 2008, he died at a hospital in Toronto.
