= Paul Hoffert =

Canadian artist

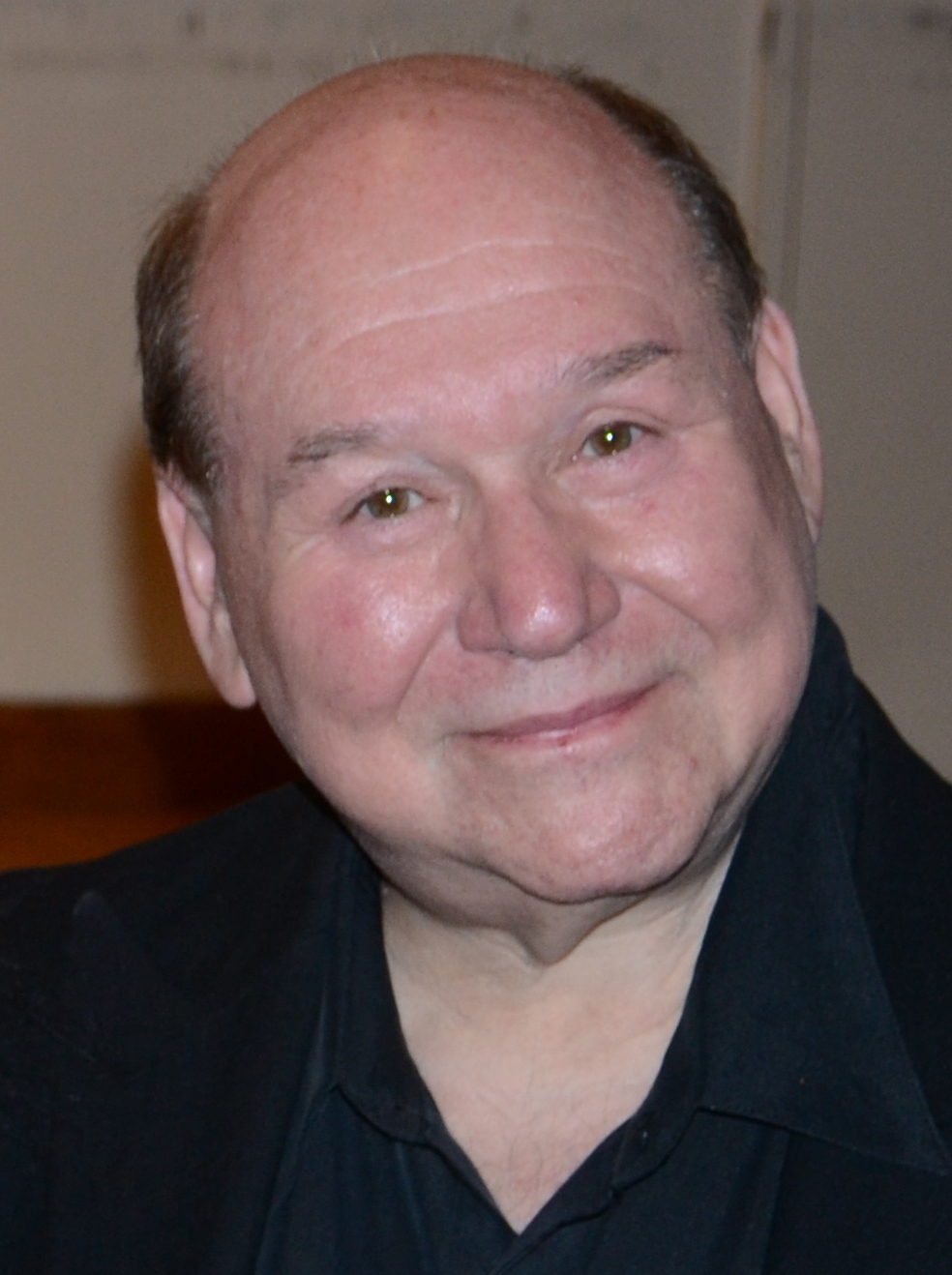
- Hoffert in 2012
- Born: Paul Matthew Hoffert; 22 September 1943 (age 82); Brooklyn, New York, U.S.
- Occupations: recording artist; performer; media music composer; author; academic; corporate executive

Paul Matthew Hoffert, LLD, CM (born 22 September 1943, in Brooklyn, New York) is a recording artist, performer, media music composer, author, academic, and corporate executive. He studied mathematics and physics at the University of Toronto. He later studied music composition with Gordon Delamont. In 1969, the 26-year-old Hoffert co-founded Lighthouse, a rock group that sold millions of records and earned three Juno Awards as one of Canada's leading pop bands. His film music earned him a San Francisco Film Festival and three SOCAN Film Composer of the Year awards and included films such as The Proud Rider (1971), The Groundstar Conspiracy (1972), Outrageous! (1977), High-Ballin' (1978), The Shape of Things to Come (1979), Wild Horse Hank (1979), Mr. Patman (1980), Deadly Companion (1981), Paradise (1982), Fanny Hill (1983), Bedroom Eyes (1984), and Mr. Nice Guy (1987).

In 2001, Hoffert received the Pixel Award as the New Media industry's "Visionary of the Year".

Hoffert has parallel achievements in science and technology. He was a researcher at the National Research Council of Canada in the early 1970s and returned to research in 1988 as Vice President of DHJ Research, where he invented precursor algorithms to MP3 audio compression, as well as microchips for Newbridge Microsystems and products for Mattel, Akai, and Yamaha.

In 1992, Hoffert founded the CulTech Research Centre at York University, where he developed advanced media such as digital videophones and networked distribution of CD-ROMs. From 1994 to 1999, he directed Intercom Ontario, a $100 million trial of the world's first completely connected broadband community that landed him on the cover of the Financial Post and in the Wall Street Journal. He is an expert in online content distribution and usage consumption.

Hoffert was awarded the Order of Canada [CM] in 2004 for his contributions to music and the arts. The Canadian Government citation reads: "[Mr. Hoffert] is multitalented, determined, and a visionary. Paul Hoffert is a founding member of the rock group Lighthouse and an award-winning composer who has scored countless feature films and television productions. He received an honorary PhD from the University of Toronto in June 2012."

"Formerly a teacher at the Faculty of Fine Arts at York University, Hoffert founded the University's CulTech Research Centre and is an expert on new media and technology. A founding director of the Canadian Independent Record Producers Association and the Academy of Canadian Cinema and Television, he was instrumental in bringing about the Gemini and Prix Gémeaux awards. He was the first artist to chair the Ontario Arts Council, and he continues to be involved in multiple arts organizations and the Bell Broadcast and New Media Fund."

== Current positions ==
- Chair of the Bell Broadcast and New Media Fund, 1997–
- Chair of the Screen Composers Guild of Canada, 1999–
- President of the Glenn Gould Foundation US
- Director, Ontario Cultural Attractions Fund, 1999–
- Music Director Lighthouse, 1968–1974, 1993–

== Previous positions ==
- Vice President of Sistema Toronto 2011-2013
- CEO, Noank Media Inc, 2006–2009
- Faculty Fellow at Harvard Law School, 2005–2007
- Board Director, World Summit Information Society Awards (United Nations), 2004–2005
- President, Academy of Canadian Cinema and Television, 1981–1982 [Dir. 1979–1980, 1983–1987]
- Chair, Ontario Arts Council, 1994–1997
- Research Professor, Sheridan College, 1999–2003
- Director, CulTech Research Centre, York University, 1992–2000
- Director of R&D, Rights Clearing House, Calgary, 2001–2004
- Research Director, OnDisC Alliance, 2000–2003
- President, Intercom Ontario (broadband research trial), 1994–1998
- Director, DACARIE Audio Research Laboratory, York University, 1990–1992
- Vice President Research, DHJ Research, 1986–1992 [VP Technology Transfer 1989–1992]
- Researcher, National Research Council of Canada, 1969–1971

== Current boards ==
- Screen Composers Guild of Canada SCGC, 1999-
- Bell Broadcast and New Media Fund, 1997-
- Glenn Gould Foundation, 2000-
- Sistema Toronto, 2012-
- Ontario Cultural Attractions Fund, 1999-

== Books authored by Paul Hoffert ==
- Music for New Media: Composing for Videogames, Websites, Presentations, and Other Interactive Media, Berklee Press, January 2007
- The New Client: How Customers Shape Business in the Information Age, Penguin/Viking Canada, 2002
- All Together Now: Connected Communities Will Revolutionize the Way You Live, Work, and Play, Stoddart Publishing, 2000
- The Bagel Effect: A Compass to Navigate the Wired World, McGraw-Hill Ryerson Press, 1998
- Internet Technologies Primer, CulTech Publishing, [co-author Dr. Peter Roosen-Runge], 1997
- Inventory of Internet Technologies and Services, Industry Canada Publication, [co-author Dr. Peter Roosen-Runge], 1996
- Understanding Music in Media, Hoffert Publishing, 1987
- Hoffert Guide to Synchronizing Music, Hoffert Publishing, 1982

== Archives ==
- Paul Hoffert fonds, York University, Toronto (2005): paper documents, CDs, DVDs, audio tapes, video tapes
- Canada Science and Technology Museum, Ottawa (2005): musical instruments, computer and research technology, awards, performance clothing
