= Wild Horse Hank =

- Based on: The Wild Horse Killers by Mel Ellis
- Written by: James Lee Barret
- Directed by: Eric Till
- Starring: Linda Blair; Michael Wincott; Richard Crenna
- Music by: Brenda Hoffert; Paul Hoffert
- Country of origin: Canada
- Original language: English

Production
- Producers: William Marshall; Henk Van der Kolk
- Cinematography: Richard Leiterman
- Editor: George Appleby
- Running time: 96 minutes
- Production company: Film Consortium of Canada
- Budget: $CAD2,800,000 (estimated)

Original release
- Network: NBC (network premiere)
- Release: 1979

Wild Horse Hank is a 1979 Canadian adventure drama film directed by Eric Till and starring Linda Blair, Michael Wincott and Richard Crenna. It is based on the 1978 teen novel The Wild Horse Killers written by Mel Ellis.

== Plot ==
Wild Horse Hank is the adventure of a brave young cowgirl named Hank (Linda Blair), who is independent and has been around horses all her life. One day while out searching for her prized stallion, Hank happens upon some horse hunters who are rounding up a herd of mustangs to sell for pet food. Hank follows the hunters into town and releases the horses. If Hank is to save these wild animals, they must reach the protection of federal land, but the nearest such area lies across a desert, through a river, and over a mountain range, altogether some 150 miles away.

Pace, Hank's father (Richard Crenna), objects to Hank's plan to save the horses, but finally agrees to let her go. Hank begins her adventure, herding the horses toward the Rantan Game Preserve, but the epic drive soon becomes a contest of wills with the poachers, who are trying to outwit Hank whenever possible.

== Cast ==
- Linda Blair as Hank Bradford
- Michael Wincott as Charlie Connors
- Richard Crenna as Pace Bradford
- Al Waxman as Jay Conors
- Lloyd Berry as Foreman
- Richard Fitzpatrick as Clay
- Barbara Gordon as Marlene Connors
- Helen Hughes as Mrs Webley
- Stephen E. Miller as Harper
- James D. Morris as Sheriff Walter Mack
- Richard J. Reynolds as Rankin

== Production ==
The film was shot on location at Dinosaur Provincial Park and Waterton Lakes National Park in Alberta, Canada between August and October 1978 and was broadcast in 1982 as a television network premiere. It is also known under the alternate titles: Hard Ride Hank, Hard Ride to Rantan, Long Shot in the United States.

== DVD release ==
Wild Horse Hank was released on DVD on September 16, 2008 for the 1st time.
