= Fred Haeseker =

Canadian film critic

Fred Haeseker (1943-2023) was the film critic and entertainment writer at the Calgary Herald from 1979 until 1999. During this time he wrote hundreds or reviews on current releases as well as news about the local filmmaking scene in Calgary; including articles on the first efforts of director David Winning. Haeseker, died at the Rosedale Hospice in Calgary after a lengthy illness on Tuesday, February 14, 2023 at the age of 79 years. Haeseker's reviews were included in the essay Canada's Best Features: Critical Essays on 15 Canadian Films By Eugene P. Walz.
