= Tammy Frick =

Canadian film industry executive

Tammy Frick is a Canadian film industry executive, who was appointed as chief executive officer of the Academy of Canadian Cinema and Television in October 2022.

She was previously executive director of the Cinéfest Sudbury International Film Festival from 1995 to 2022, and an associate director of Cultural Industries Ontario North. In 2019, she won an award from the Toronto chapter of Women in Film and Television International in honour of her achievements in the film industry.

In 2021 she sought the nomination to be the Liberal Party of Canada candidate for Sudbury in the 2021 Canadian federal election, losing to Viviane Lapointe.
