= Bill Marshall (producer) =

Canadian filmmaker

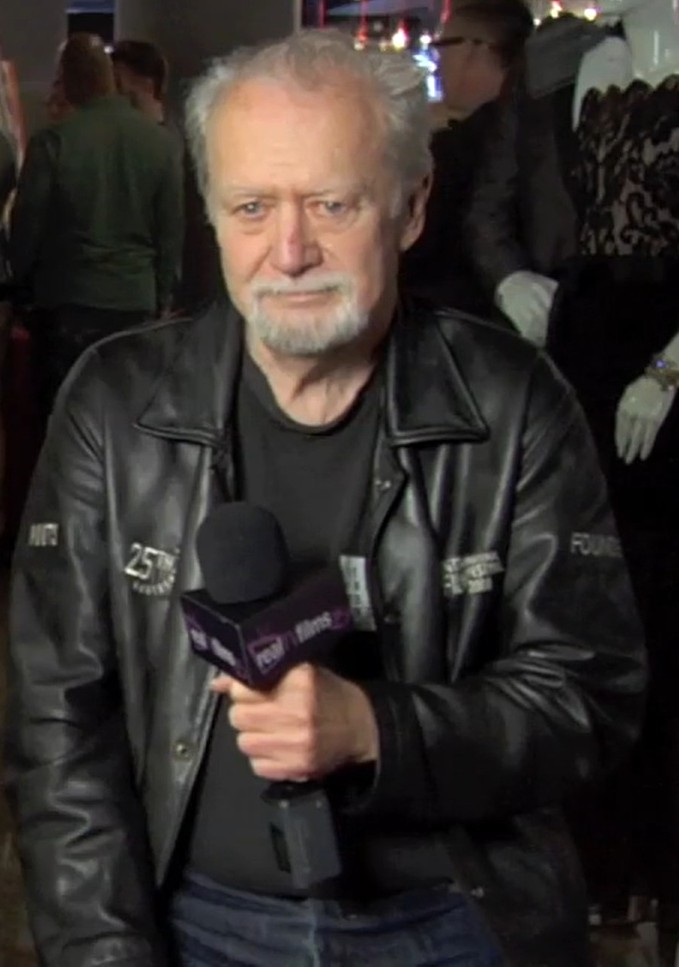
Marshall in 2013

Bill Marshall (June 13, 1939 – January 1, 2017) was a Scottish-born Canadian filmmaker, film and theatre producer, and author. In 1976, Marshall co-founded the Toronto Festival of Festivals, now known as the Toronto International Film Festival (TIFF), with Dusty Cohl and Henk Van der Kolk. The first Festival of Festivals drew 35,000 attendees to view 127 films in October 1976. The Toronto Film Festival is now one of the largest film festivals in the world and established Toronto as a major hub for film and cinema. Marshall has been called "a pioneer in the Canadian film industry" for his role in establishing the festival and for expanding Canadian filmmaking into a major nationwide artistic and business sector.

== Biography ==
Marshall was born in Glasgow, Scotland, in 1939. His father was a socialist railway worker who regularly visited the left-wing Citizens Theatre in the city. In 1955, when Marshall was 15, the whole family emigrated to Canada, and Marshall later became a Canadian citizen. During his professional career, Marshall produced thirteen feature films, as well as several theatre productions, including the Toronto run of the musical Hair.

Marshall and Henk Van der Kolk worked together for over 49 years. The duo first met while both were working on the set of Frankenstein on Campus in 1969.

In 1976, Marshal, Van der Kolk, and Dusty Cohl co-founded the Festival of Festivals, now known as the Toronto Film Festival. Marshall served as the film festival's director from 1976 to 1979 and retained the title of Toronto International Film Festival chair emeritus.

Marshall also led the creation of both the Academy of Canadian Cinema & Television and the Toronto Film and Television Office. He served as a president of the Canadian Association of Motion Picture Producers.

In 2002, Marshall was appointed as a Member of the Order of Canada in recognition of his "major role in developing Canada's film industry and culture." Marshall and Van der Kolk proposed a possible film festival in Trenton, Ontario, for the 150th anniversary of Canada in 2017.

Marshall died of cardiac arrest on January 1, 2017, at the age of 77.
