= Academy of Canadian Cinema & Television =

Canadian non-profit organization

- Abbreviation: Canadian Academy
- Formation: 1979; 47 years ago
- Type: Film organization
- Headquarters: Toronto, Ontario, Canada
- Members: 4000
- Website: www.academy.ca

The Academy of Canadian Cinema & Television (French: Académie canadienne du cinéma et de la télévision) is a Canadian nonprofit organization created in 1979 to recognize the achievements of the over 4,000 Canadian film industry and television industry professionals, most notably through the Canadian Screen Awards. The mandate of the Academy is to honour outstanding achievements; to heighten public awareness of and increase audience attendance of and appreciation of Canadian film and television productions; and to provide critically needed, high-quality professional development programs, conferences and publications.

== Background ==
Since 2012, the Academy's primary national awards program is the Canadian Screen Awards, which were announced that year as a replacement for the formerly distinct Genie Award (for film) and Gemini Award (for television) ceremonies. The Prix Gémeaux for French-language television remains a separate awards program. The organization also administers the Prism Prize for music videos.

The chief executive officer as of October 2022 is Tammy Frick. The organization's previous CEO was Beth Janson, who left in April 2022 to take a job as chief operating officer of the Toronto International Film Festival.

Since December 2023, the chair of the board of directors is Thomas Santram and the vice-chair is Solange Attwood. The previous chair was John Young of Boat Rocker Media.

== Milestones ==
- 1979 – The Academy of Canadian Cinema is established
- 1980 – The Etrog is renamed the Genie Award
- 1980 – The 1st Genie Awards ceremony is held
- 1985 – The organization is renamed the Academy of Canadian Cinema & Television
- 1986 – The Gemini Award statuette is unveiled
- 1987 – The 1st Prix Gémeaux ceremony is held
- 1993 – The Claude Jutra Award is established to recognize first time directors
  - Following the February 2016 publication of Yves Lever's biography of Jutra, containing allegations that Jutra had sexually abused underage children during his lifetime, the Academy announced that it was removing Jutra's name from the award. The award is now called the John Dunning Best First Feature Award.
- 1995 – The Academy's official website, academy.ca, goes online
- 2003 – Digital Media Awards are introduced at the 2010 Gemini Awards
- 2008 – The Prix Gémeaux ceremony is webcast
- 2012 – The Academy announces the merger of its Gemini and Genie Awards programs into the Canadian Screen Awards

== See also ==
- Canadian television awards
- Cinema of Canada
- National Film Board of Canada
- Canadian Broadcasting Corporation
