= Toronto International Film Festival =

Annual film festival in Canada

Coordinates: 43°38′48″N 79°23′25″W

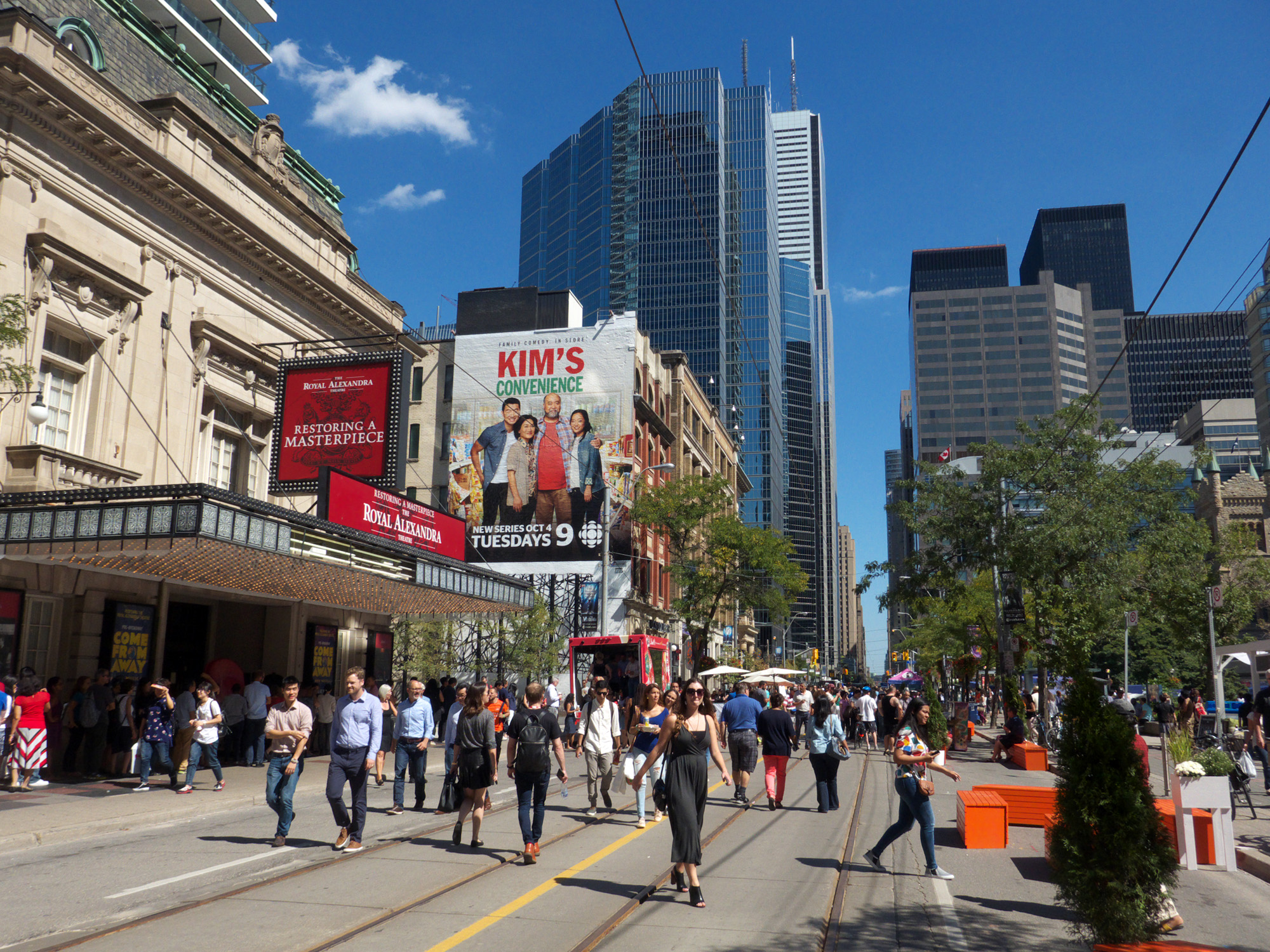
- King Street West during the 2016 Toronto International Film Festival
- Location: Toronto, Ontario, Canada
- Founded: 1976; 50 years ago
- Awards: People's Choice Award
- Language: International
- Website: tiff.net

Most recent: 2026
- 2027 2025

The Toronto International Film Festival (TIFF) is one of the most prestigious and largest publicly attended film festivals in the world.

Founded in 1976, the festival takes place every year in early September, in downtown Toronto. The organization behind the film festival is also a permanent destination for film culture at the TIFF Lightbox, which serves as a venue for some film screenings during the festival as well as cinematheque film series, commercial art house and independent film screenings, and other specialty film festivals, throughout the year.

The TIFF People's Choice Award – which is based on audience balloting – has emerged as an indicator of success during awards season, especially at the Academy Awards. Past recipients of this award include Oscar-winning films, such as Chariots of Fire (1981), Life Is Beautiful (1998), American Beauty (1999), Crouching Tiger, Hidden Dragon (2000), Slumdog Millionaire (2008), The King's Speech (2010), Silver Linings Playbook (2012), 12 Years a Slave (2013), The Imitation Game (2014), La La Land (2016), Three Billboards Outside Ebbing, Missouri (2017), Green Book (2018), Jojo Rabbit (2019), Nomadland (2020), Belfast (2021) and American Fiction (2023).

TIFF starts the Thursday night after Labour Day (the first Monday in September in Canada) and lasts for eleven days. The 2024 Toronto International Film Festival took place from September 5 through 15, 2024. The 2025 Toronto International Film Festival took place from September 4 through 14, 2025.

Along with Berlin, Cannes, Venice, and Sundance, TIFF is one of the Big Five international film festivals.

== Background ==
The Toronto International Film Festival was first launched as the Toronto Festival of Festivals, collecting the best films from other film festivals around the world and showing them to eager audiences in Toronto. Founded by Bill Marshall, Dusty Cohl, and Henk Van der Kolk, the inaugural event took place from October 18 through 24, 1976. That first year, 31,500 filmgoers watched 155 feature films from 30 countries presented in ten programmes.

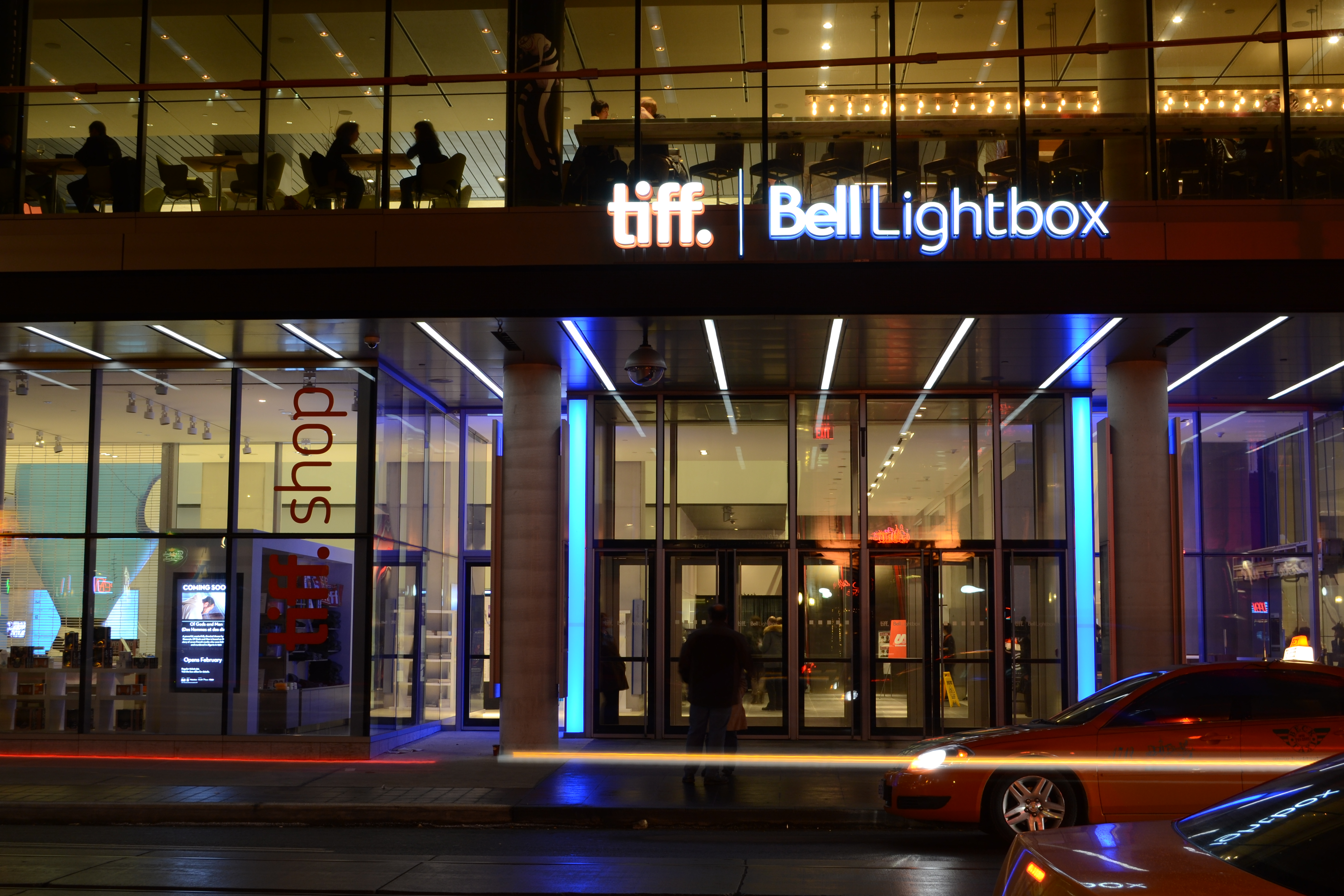
Lightbox is the cultural centrepiece and home to TIFF programming outside festival dates

TIFF was once centred on the Yorkville neighbourhood, but, following the closure of the University Theatre in 1986, which had been used for the nightly gala presentations, the festival moved downtown to the Toronto Entertainment District, with most galas initially being held at the Ryerson Theatre and the closing night gala at Roy Thomson Hall. TIFF is known for the celebrity buzz it brings to the area with international media setting up near its restaurants and stores for photos and interviews with the stars. In 2010, TIFF opened its permanent headquarters, TIFF Lightbox, a year-round home for the appreciation of film in the heart of downtown Toronto, although TIFF films are still screened at a wider variety of venues, including the Scotiabank Theatre Toronto, rather than exclusively at the Lightbox.

TIFF has grown, steadily adding initiatives throughout the years. TIFF Cinematheque (formerly Cinematheque Ontario) and the Film Reference Library (FRL) opened in 1990. The TIFF Kids International Film Festival (formerly Sprockets) launched in 1998. Film Circuit began exhibiting independent and Canadian films in under-serviced cities across Canada in 1994.

The festival also organizes the TIFF Film Circuit, a program which partners with local organizations in other Canadian towns and cities to present screenings of films that have previously been shown at TIFF.

In May 2024, TIFF announced that it will launch a full film market in 2026.

== Leadership ==
Throughout its history, TIFF has had numerous periods when the same individual served as both a head of the festival and the parent organization. Other times, the positions have diverged. It also has had co-directors at some times.

=== Festival Director ===
After the founding, Wayne Clarkson became festival director in 1978, when it was still known as the Toronto Festival of Festivals. In 1986, the founder of the Vancouver International Film Festival, Leonard Schein, became festival director, but resigned after just one festival cycle. Deputy director Helga Stephenson was elevated as interim head of the organization before taking over the position permanently in 1987.

In 1994, Piers Handling became the festival's director, as well as CEO, which was an unusually powerful combination. In 2004, Noah Cowan became co-director of TIFF. Longtime programmer Cameron Bailey succeeded Cowan as co-director in 2007 when Cowan became the artistic director of the newly opened TIFF Lightbox,

In 2018, upon her ascent as executive director, Joana Vicente also became co-director of the festival.

=== CEO and Executive Director ===
Piers Handling was the first official CEO starting in 1994, a position he held until 2018, when he was succeeded by Joana Vicente as the top business executive. Vicente served as executive director and co-head of the organization. Vicente left in 2021 to run the Sundance Institute and Cameron Bailey was elevated to be singular CEO of TIFF in 2021.

Bailey became the artistic director of the Toronto International Film Festival, as well as TIFF Lightbox's year round programming.

=== Current Leadership ===
As of 2026, in addition to Bailey, the leadership of the organization includes Anita Lee as chief of programming, Jennifer Frees as chief business officer, Charles Tremblay as head of market, Judy Lung as head of communications and strategy.

== History ==
The festival was founded in 1976 at the Windsor Arms Hotel by Bill Marshall, Henk Van der Kolk and Dusty Cohl. Beginning as a collection of the best-regarded films from film festivals around the world, it had an inaugural attendance of 35,000. Ironically, however, Hollywood studios withdrew their submissions from TIFF due to concerns that Toronto audiences would be too parochial for their feature releases.

In 1978, the festival first began billing itself as "the Toronto International Film Festival" as a supplementary name, although it retained Festival of Festivals as its primary branding. At the same time it moved from the Harbour Castle Hotel to the Plaza II, and Wayne Clarkson replaced Marshall as the festival director. The number of galas increased from one to two per night and the Canadian Film Awards were incorporated into the festival.

The Festival of Festivals name was dropped in 1994, with the event becoming known exclusively as the Toronto International Film Festival at that time. From 1994 to 2009, the umbrella organization running TIFF was named "Toronto International Film Festival Group" (TIFFG). In 2009, the umbrella organization TIFFG was renamed to TIFF.

In 2001, Perspective Canada, the programme that had focused on Canadian films since 1984, was replaced by two programmes:

- Canada First!, a forum for Canadian filmmakers presenting their first feature-length work, featuring eight to 15 films, and
- Short Cuts Canada, which includes 30-40 Canadian short films.

As of 2015, Canadian films are now simply included alongside international films in the other film programs rather than being grouped as a dedicated Canadian film stream.

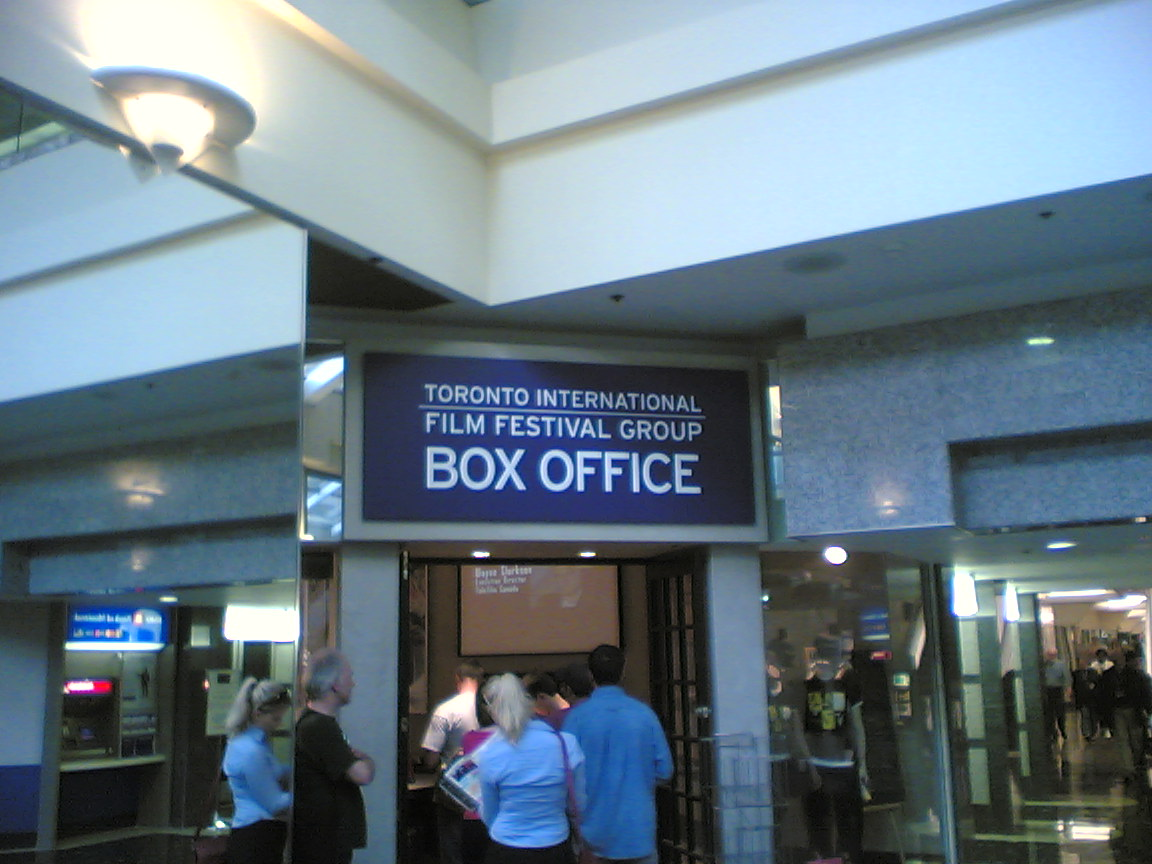
TIFF box office at the Manulife Centre in 2006

In 2004, TIFF was featured as the site of murder mystery in the film Jiminy Glick in Lalawood, a comedy film starring Martin Short.

In 2007, it was announced that the organization generates an estimated annual impact of $67 million CAD. By 2011, that benefit had grown to $170 million CAD.

In 2016, 397 films from 83 countries were screened at 28 screens in downtown Toronto venues, welcoming an estimated 480,000 attendees, over 5,000 of whom were industry professionals.

In 2017, TIFF reduced the number of films screened compared to the 2016 festival with 255 feature-length films in 2017, and also eliminated two venues that had been used in prior years.

In 2019, it was reported that due to a request from its owner, Cineplex Entertainment, no TIFF films distributed by subscription video-on-demand services (specifically Amazon Video and Netflix) are being screened at Scotiabank Theatre—which has been considered the "primary" venue of the festival.

The 2020 edition was both in-person and virtual due to the COVID-19 pandemic, with the virtual platform provided by Shift72. The film screenings were initially declared as "masks optional", a decision that drew criticism for creating a potential superspreader event as the social nature of the festival could increase the risk for COVID-19 transmission. The festival reversed the decision within 24 hours, citing a surge of new cases in Ontario, and made masks mandatory at the physical screenings.

The 2020 festival also saw the introduction of Industry Selects, an ad hoc film market for films seeking commercial distribution. Due to the pandemic, which prevented members of the North American film industry from travelling to international film festivals where many of the Industry Selects films were screened, they were available on the festival's industry platform, but not on the commercial platform for the general public. Introduced at the time as a temporary measure due to the pandemic, it was converted into a permanent part of the TIFF program in 2022, and became the nucleus of the festival's plans to launch a full film market in 2026.

=== Notable film premieres ===
Films such as American Beauty, Ray, Mr. Nobody, 127 Hours, Black Swan, Disobedience, The Five Obstructions, Singapore Sling, I Am Love and The Fabelmans have premiered at TIFF. Jamie Foxx's portrayal of Ray Charles ultimately won him the Academy Award for Best Actor while Slumdog Millionaire went on to win eight Oscars at the 2009 Academy Awards. Precious, which won the 2009 TIFF People's Choice Award, went on to win two Oscars at the 82nd Academy Awards. The King's Speech, the winner of the 2010 TIFF People's Choice Award, won four Oscars at the 83rd Academy Awards, while Silver Linings Playbook, the winner of the 2012 TIFF People's Choice Award, went on to win the Academy Award for Best Actress for Jennifer Lawrence. In 2019, the festival opened with Once Were Brothers: Robbie Robertson and The Band, the first time the festival ever opened with a Canadian documentary film.

Many Hollywood studios premiere their films in Toronto due to TIFF's easy-going non-competitive nature, relatively inexpensive costs (when compared to European festivals), eager film-fluent audiences and convenient timing.

=== TIFF Lightbox ===
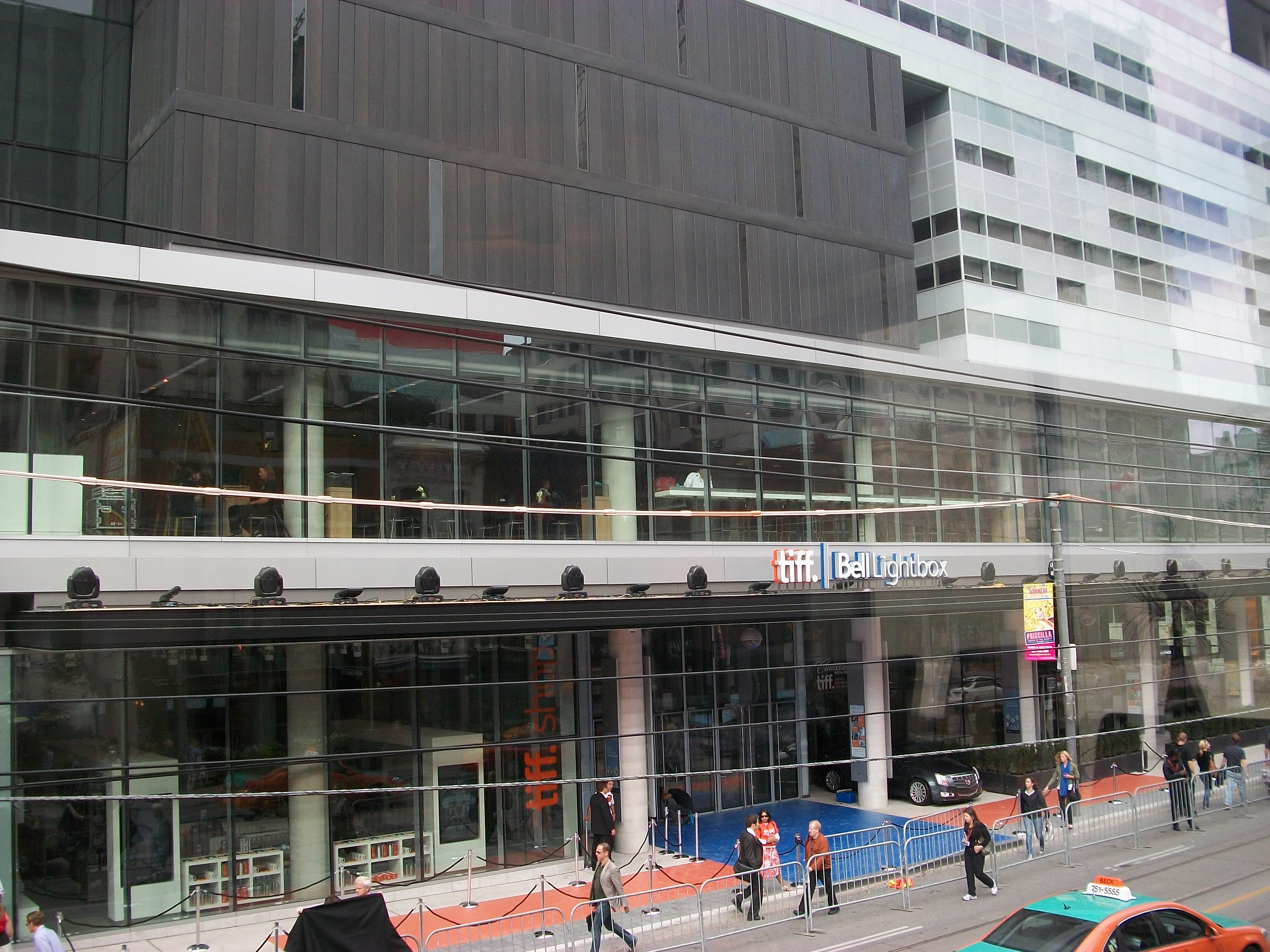
TIFF Lightbox

In 2007, the Festival Group began construction on TIFF Lightbox, a new facility at the corner of King and John Streets in downtown Toronto, on land donated by Ivan Reitman and family. The CA$181 million facility was sponsored by Bell Canada, with additional support from the Government of Ontario and Government of Canada.

In 2010, the organization opened its new headquarters at TIFF Lightbox. The facility, designed by local firm KPMB Architects, provides extensive year-round galleries, cinemas, archives and activities for cinephiles. The five-storey facility contains five cinemas, two gallery spaces, film archives and an extensive reference library, study spaces, film lab facility, and a research centre. There is also a gift shop, two restaurants, a lounge, a cafe, and a three-storey atrium. Cooperatively with Daniels Corporation, there is a 46-storey condominium atop, called the Festival Tower.

The first film screening was Bruce McDonald's Trigger. The first exhibition was a retrospective on Tim Burton, organized by the Museum of Modern Art (New York City). Subsequent exhibitions include Fellini: Spectacular Obsessions, Grace Kelly: From Movie Star to Princess, Designing 007: 50 Years of Bond Style, and Stanley Kubrick: The Exhibition, all of which were organized by TIFF, as well as one called Essential Cinema, featuring posters, images and props from TIFF's The Essential 100 list of films.

The Film Reference Library (FRL) is a large Canadian film research collection. The library is a free resource for film lovers, filmmakers, students, scholars, and journalists, and is located on the fourth floor of the TIFF Lightbox. An affiliate member of the International Federation of Film Archives (FIAF), the FRL promotes Canadian and global film scholarship by collecting, preserving, and providing access to a comprehensive collection of film prints, and film-related reference resources (including books, periodicals, scripts, research files, movies, press kits, and about 80 special collections.

In 2016, the festival received a donation of 1,400 film prints, and launched a campaign to raise money for the preservation and storage of the films.

=== Canada's Top Ten ===
Annually, TIFF releases a Canada's Top Ten list of the films selected by a poll of festival programmers across Canada as the ten best Canadian feature and short films of the year, regardless of whether or not they were screened at TIFF. Formerly announced in December each year, TIFF has shifted in the 2020s to announcing each year's list in early January of the following year.

Previously, the winning films were screened at a smaller follow-up "Canada's Top Ten" festival at the Lightbox the following January, with a People's Choice Award then presented for that mini-festival. In 2018, TIFF announced a change, under which instead of a dedicated festival, each Top Ten film would receive its own standalone theatrical run at the Lightbox throughout the year. The festival has since shifted back to screening the Canada's Top Ten selections as a dedicated screening series in February each year, although it has not reintroduced a People's Choice award for the series. The Canada's Top Ten program does, however, now include a Charles Officer Award, presented in memory of film director Charles Officer to an emerging Canadian filmmaker; despite being presented at the opening of the Canada's Top Ten screening series, this award does not require the recipient to have had a film included in that program.

Since 1984, every decade TIFF has also produced a Top 10 Canadian Films of All Time list. This list is produced from a wider poll of film industry professionals and academics throughout Canada, separately from the annual top-ten list.

== Awards ==
The festival's major prize, the TIFF People's Choice Award, is given to a feature-length film. It is not a juried prize, but is given to the film with the highest ratings as voted by the TIFF-going populace. Past sponsors of the award have included Cadillac and Grolsch. The winners of this award have often later earned Academy Award nominations. People's Choice Awards are also presented for Documentary and Midnight Madness films. Each of the People's Choice Awards names first and second runners-up in addition to the winners.

However, TIFF does present juried awards in some other categories. The festival presents three major awards for Canadian films: Best Canadian Film, Best Canadian First Feature Film, and Best Canadian Short Film, as well as awards for Best International Short Film, two FIPRESCI-sponsored International Critics' Prizes for the Special Presentation and Discovery programs, and a NETPAC Prize for the best film from Asia having its world premiere at the festival.

In 2015, the festival introduced Platform, a juried programme that champions director's cinema from around the world; one film from the stream is selected as the winner of the Platform Prize.

For all of the juried awards, honorable mentions may also be given, although the juries are expected to select one overall winner.

In 2019, the festival introduced the TIFF Tribute Awards, a gala ceremony at which distinguished actors and filmmakers are honoured for their lifetime career achievements; unlike most award categories, the Tribute Award honorees are named in advance of the festival.

In May 2025, the festival announced that a new International People's Choice Award would be introduced at the festival in September for international feature-length films.

== Sections ==
The hundreds of films screened at the annual festival are divided into sections (referred to by TIFF as "Programmes") based on genre (e.g. documentary, children's films), format (e.g. short films, television episodes), the status of filmmaker (e.g. "masters", first-time directors), and so forth. Up until the early 2010s there were sections reserved for Canadian films, but beginning in 2015 all Canadian films are integrated in sections with films from outside Canada.

Currently the festival's 14 sections are as follows:

- Centrepiece (formerly Contemporary World Cinema): narrative feature films by established directors
- Discovery: films that are typically the director's first or second feature film
- Gala Presentations: high-profile feature films, often featuring international movie stars, presented with a red carpet
- In Conversation With...: interviews of a director or other figure from the film industry, generally accompanied by brief excerpts from films (up until the 2014 festival, this section was called "Mavericks")
- Masters: feature films by "the world's most influential art-house filmmakers"
- Midnight Madness: genre films (traditionally at TIFF each film in this section has one screening scheduled for 11:59pm and another the following afternoon); the section was launched at TIFF in 1988 and was programmed by Colin Geddes from 1998 to 2016, now programmed by Peter Kuplowsky
- Platform: a competitive section launched in 2015, named for Jia Zhangke's film Platform, of films from around the world that do not have distribution in North America. Every year the Platform section has a high-profile international jury which confers the C$25,000 Platform Prize; both documentaries and narrative films are eligible for inclusion in the section.
- Primetime: television episodes making either their world premiere or North American premiere projected cinematically; this section was launched in 2015
- Short Cuts: a section of short films (usually six to ten short films included at each screening) both Canadian and international; up until the 2013 festival only Canadian short films were screened and the section was called Short Cuts Canada, in 2014 a new section called Short Cuts International was added, and then in 2015 they were merged into a section called Short Cuts
- Special Presentations: high-profile feature films, usually Canadian premieres if not world premieres
- TIFF Cinematheque: unlike the other sections which present new films, the TIFF Cinematheque section has films from all eras of cinema, often classic films that have been newly restored
- TIFF Docs (formerly called Reel to Reel): documentary films
- TIFF Kids and TIFF Next Wave (formerly called Sprockets): films for children and teenagers; however, these are not dedicated programs in their own right, but designations added to films of youth interest that are already in one of the other programs. TIFF also organizes smaller, separate TIFF Kids and TIFF Next Wave festivals in the spring of the year.
- Wavelengths: experimental films and art films, both feature-length and shorts (this section was named for Michael Snow's film Wavelength)

In previous years, sections at TIFF have included Perspectives Canada, Canada First!, City to City (2009 to 2016), Future Projections, Vanguard (up to 2016), and Visions (up to 2011).

== Recognition and media coverage ==
According to the BBC, TIFF is one of the largest and most prestigious events of its kind in the world. In 1998, Variety acknowledged that TIFF "is second only to Cannes in terms of high-profile pics, stars, and market activity". In 2007, Time noted that TIFF had "grown from its place as the most influential fall film festival to the most influential film festival, period".

In 2016, TIFF hosted 1,800 members of the press and print media outlets such as the Toronto Star, The Globe and Mail, The New York Times, The Times of India, Los Angeles Times, The Philadelphia Inquirer, Miami Herald, and the Toronto Sun have published a significant amount of festival coverage. Also, the major industry trade magazines Variety, The Hollywood Reporter and Screen International all produce daily editions during TIFF. TIFF reports also appear in weekly news magazines; American, Canadian and international entertainment shows; news services; and a wide range of film and celebrity blogs.

== Controversies ==
In 2008, Rose McGowan caused controversy at a TIFF press conference for her film Fifty Dead Men Walking, when she noted that "I imagine, had I grown up in Belfast, I would 100% have been in the IRA".

In 2009, TIFF's decision to spotlight films from Tel Aviv created a controversy with protesters, saying it was part of an attempt to re-brand Israel in a positive light after the January 2009 Gaza War.

In August 2025 (a month before the festival), TIFF withdrew the invitation to screen the Israeli documentary The Road Between Us: The Ultimate Rescue, which depicts rescue efforts by retired Major General Noam Tibon during the October 7 attacks in southern Israel. TIFF cited a copyright claim, stating that the filmmakers did not obtain permission to use video footage recorded by Hamas during the attacks and concerns over possible disruptions as the reason for the decision. Critics noted that Hamas is designated as a terrorist organization by the Government of Canada, and argued that the decision effectively required Israeli filmmakers to seek approval from a group officially recognized as such in order to depict these events, while TIFF noted that it needs to protect itself from any potential copyright issues, and requires all films exhibited at the festival to either show copyright clearances or provide an indemnity to protect the festival from legal liability in the event that a copyright lawsuit is launched over the film's screening. On August 14, 2025, following public criticism and discussions with the filmmakers, TIFF reversed its decision and reinstated the documentary in the festival's lineup.
