= K-9 (film series) =

- Official home video release, boxset collection artwork
- Based on: Characters created by Steven Siegel and Scott Myers
- Starring: Jim Belushi
- Distributed by: Universal Pictures
- Country: United States
- Language: English

The K-9 film series, consists of Buddy cop family-comedy films including one theatrical film, one made-for-television film, and two straight-to-home video films. The general plot centers around a hard-boiled police detectives and the German Shepherd police dogs they have as their respective partner and the cases they work together to solve; with the spin-off TV movie, which was initially developed as a pilot episode for a television series before it was passed on, revolves around a police detective who is teamed up with a mechanically enhanced German Shepperd to solve a criminal investigation.

The film series as a whole has been met with generally negative reviews. K-9 was successful at the box-office. It was met with mixed critical reception, but was praised for its use of comedy and for the dog training that was done for the animal actors that portrayed Jerry Lee. The sequels were criticized for their pacing, their "strain[ed] credibility"; and for the use of potty humor.

== Films ==
Film	U.S. release date	Director	Screenwriter(s)	Producer(s)
K-9	April 28, 1989	Rod Daniel	Steven Siegel & Scott Myers	Lawrence Gordon and Charles Gordon
K-9000	June 1, 1991	Kim Manners	Steven E. de Souza & Michael Part	Steven E. de Souza, Charles Fries and J. Rickley Dumm
K-911	December 12, 1999	Charles T. Kanganis	Gary Scott Thompson	David Bixler
K-9: P.I.	July 30, 2002	Richard J. Lewis	Gary Scott Thompson	Ron French

=== K-9 (1989) ===
Officer Michael Dooley prefers working alone, but while working a case involving the notorious drug lord named Lyman, his boss assigns him a partner. The assigned companion is Jerry Lee, a German Shepherd detection police dog in the canine unite. Initially irritated by the animal, Dooley learns how valuable Jerry Lee is. The dog assists him with tracking down and arresting cohorts of Lyman. When his girlfriend, Tracy, is abducted by Lyman and his mean, Dooley crashes a party at their mansion demanding her safe return. With no supporting evidence, he is arrested by another police officer from his own department. Jerry Lee assists in helping Dooley escape the custody, so that they can pursue Lyman and free Tracy. Dooley hijacks a truck filled with Lyman's next shipment of drugs, as collateral for his girlfriend's freedom. He threatens to blow up the truck, only for a shootout to break out. As Lyman tries to escape via helicopter, Jerry Lee chases him down. Opening fire on the dog, the canine is hit. Lyman is in turn killed by his own men. Jerry Lee recovers following an emergency operation, and he, Dooley, and Tracy take a relaxing vacation from policing in Las Vegas, Nevada.

=== K-9000 (1991) ===
Developed as a pilot for a television series based on the plot of K-9 by Steven Siegel and Scott Myers, the project was released as a TV movie instead followed by straight-to-home video release on VHS. The plot includes:

Hard-edged police officer, Detective Eddie Monroe, who has little to no skill with technology, works to apprehend the edgiest criminals. During an animal rights protest organized by activist Mrs. Wiffington, a heist organized by the villainous Anton Zeiss involving a powerful weapon takes place. Following the disappearance of the device, Monroe's boss assigns him the case. The job requires a new partner, and is teamed up with a cybernetically enhanced German Shepherd police dog named Niner. The product of female scientist Dr. Aja Turner, the dog is implanted with a computer-chip in its brain as a supersoldier program, to magnify its abilities to track and capture perpetrators. Upon teaming up with Niner, Monroe receives a microchip implant that allows communication between him and Niner. Working together the team pursues Zeiss, and a police chase ensues. Following a lengthy fight, Zeiss's plan is thwarted. Mrs. Wiffington is revealed to have been in partnership with Zeiss. With the case closed, a complicated procedure under the operation of a computer program removes the implant from Monroe, though their extrasensory telecommunications abilities remains. Dr. Turner allows the policeman to keep the tech-dog. Taking a break from police task, Monroe takes Niner on a tropic vacation.

=== K-911 (1999) ===
Detective Michael Dooley and his faithful German shepherd partner Jerry Lee, have worked together in a partnership of 10 years apprehending criminals. Jerry Lee has aged considerably, due to the difference in dog years, and struggles to keep up with police responsibilities. The partnership, assigned in solving case involving a mysterious murderous criminal, scrambles to crack the case. Dooley reluctantly teams up with fellow Sgt. Wendy Wells and her Dobermann Pinscher named Zeus, in pursuing the gun-wielding psychopath. Confronting the lawbreaker Devon Lane, its revealed that the sociopath is motivated by his resolve that Dooley's late-wife Tracey was in love with him, based on her previous compliment of his talents, and is convinced that the policeman is guilty for her death. Lane attacks the officer, and attempts to kill him in a climatic showdown. Just before Dooley is eliminated, Jerry Lee springs into action and tackles the offender resulting in his arrest. Dooley is taken to the hospital for gunshot treatments, and recovers with his companion Jerry Lee by his side.

=== K-9: P.I. (2002) ===
Approaching and finally ready to settle into retirement years, a retirement party for Detective Mike Dooley and his partner and police dog Jerry Lee. On their way home after celebrating, the pair come across a robbery at the LA Micro Labs. They give chase to the industrial thief, but he escapes after murdering several security guards. Believing that the criminal has stolen a valuable advanced-tech microchip, Dooley decides to approach the law enforcement. However, in doing so he inadvertently find themselves in the middle of an investigation as the criminal suspects. With his pension now frozen until his name is cleared, Dooley determines to solve the case. With the help of Jerry Lee, the team sets out to find the criminals and clear their names. However, since he's a suspect of an F.B.I. examination and therefore unable to access his old police resources, Dooley creates his own private investigation firm. His first client is woman searching for her missing fiancé, a questionable figure who Dooley determines may be involved with the technology theft. Shortly thereafter, he discovers that Jerry Lee swallowed the missing microchip. After apprehending the accomplice, and determining the burglar's identity, Dooley sets in motion a plan to feign a bribery exchange of money for the microchip. Dooley and Jerry Lee arrest the perpetrator and return the technology to its rightful owner, clearing their names from any association with the crime. Celebrating their success, the duo re-enter their retirement.

== Main cast and characters ==
List indicators

This section includes characters who will appear or have appeared in the franchise in main roles.

- An empty grey cell indicates the character was not in the film, or that the character's official presence has not yet been confirmed.
- ^{P} indicates an appearance in onscreen photographs.
- ^{V} indicates a voice-only role.

Character	K-9	K-9000	K-911	K-9: P.I.
Principal cast
Det. Michael "Mike" Dooley	James Belushi		James Belushi	James Belushi
Jerry Lee	Rando "Jerry Lee" Koton		Mac, Sonto & Reno	King
Det. Eddie Monroe		Chris Mulkey		
Dr. Aja Turner		Catherine Oxenberg		
Niner		Koton Jerry Houser^{V}		
Supporting cast
Tracy Dooley	Mel Harris		Mel Harris^{P}	
Ken Lyman	Kevin Tighe			
Anton Zeiss		Judson Earney Scott		
Mrs. Wiffington		Anne Haney		
Sgt. Wendy Welles			Christine Tucci	
Zeus			Lucan, Taze & Jasmine	
Devon Lane			Wade Williams	
the Thief				Dean Choe

== Additional crew and production details ==
Film	Crew/Detail					
Film	Composer	Cinematographer	Editor	Production companies	Distributing company	Running time
K-9	Miles Goodman	Dean Semler	Lois Freeman-Fox	Universal Pictures, Gordon Company	Universal Pictures	1hr 42mins
K-9000	Jan Hammer	Frank Raymond	J.P. Farrell	De Souza Productions, Fries Entertainment	Metro-Goldwyn-Mayer, Fox Network, Fries Home Video	1hr 36mins
K-911	Stephen Edwards	George Mooradian	Carter DeHaven	Universal Pictures Home Entertainment	Universal Studios Home Video	1hr 31mins
K-9: P.I.	Nick Pierone	Roy H. Wagner	Ron Wisman	Universal Pictures	Universal Home Video	1hr 35mins

== Reception ==
=== Box office and financial performance ===
Film	Box office gross			Box office ranking		Budget	Total worldwide net income	References
Film	North America	Other territories	Worldwide	All-time North America	All-time worldwide	Budget	Total worldwide net income	References
K-9	$43,247,647	$35,000,000	$78,247,647	#2,225	#3,313	$17,000,000	$61,247,647	
K-9000	—N/a	—N/a	—N/a	—N/a	—N/a	figures not available	figures not available	
K-911	—N/a	—N/a	—N/a	—N/a	—N/a	figures not available	figures not available	
K-9: P.I.	—N/a	—N/a	—N/a	—N/a	—N/a	figures not available	figures not available	—N/a

=== Critical and public response ===
Film	Rotten Tomatoes	Metacritic
K-9	22% (9 reviews)	44/100 (11 reviews)
K-9000	—N/a	—N/a
K-911	17% (6 reviews)	—N/a
K-9: P.I.	0% (6 reviews)	—N/a
