= List of 20th Century Fox films (1990–1999) =

This is a list of films produced by 20th Century Fox (now 20th Century Studios) beginning in 1990 up until 1999.

== 1990 ==
Release date	Title	Notes
January 12, 1990	Downtown	co-production with Pacific Western Productions
February 16, 1990	Nightbreed	distribution only; produced by Morgan Creek Productions
March 16, 1990	Nuns on the Run	distribution only; produced by HandMade Films
April 13, 1990	Vital Signs	
April 13, 1990	The Gods Must Be Crazy II	International theatrical distribution only; distributed in the U.S. by Columbia Pictures and Weintraub Entertainment Group
May 4, 1990	Short Time	USA theatrical distribution only; produced by Gladden Entertainment (Note: Owned by MGM)
July 4, 1990	Die Hard 2	co-production with Silver Pictures and Gordon Company
July 11, 1990	The Adventures of Ford Fairlane	co-production with Silver Pictures
August 3, 1990	Young Guns II	distribution only; produced by Morgan Creek Productions
August 17, 1990	The Exorcist III	distribution only; produced by Morgan Creek Productions and Carter De Haven Productions
September 21, 1990	Miller's Crossing	produced by Circle Films
September 28, 1990	Pacific Heights	distribution only; produced by Morgan Creek Productions and Pacific Heights Productions
October 5, 1990	Marked for Death	co-production with Victor and Grais Productions and Steamroller Productions
November 2, 1990	Frankenstein Unbound	distribution only; produced by Mount Film Company, Byron Films and Concorde Pictures
November 16, 1990	Home Alone	Nominated for the Golden Globe Award for Best Motion Picture – Musical or Comedy. co-production with Hughes Entertainment
November 21, 1990	Predator 2	co-production with Silver Pictures, Gordon Company and Davis Entertainment
December 7, 1990	Edward Scissorhands	
December 23, 1990	Come See the Paradise	co-production with Lilico Pictures and Dirty Hands Productions

== 1991 ==
Release date	Title	Notes
February 8, 1991	Sleeping with the Enemy	
March 15, 1991	Class Action	co-production with Interscope Communications
March 22, 1991	Teenage Mutant Ninja Turtles II: The Secret of the Ooze	International distribution only; distributed in the U.S. by New Line Cinema; produced by Mirage Studios and Golden Harvest
March 29, 1991	The Five Heartbeats	
May 17, 1991	Mannequin Two: On the Move	USA theatrical distribution only; produced by Gladden Entertainment
May 24, 1991	Only the Lonely	co-production with Hughes Entertainment
June 21, 1991	Dying Young	
July 12, 1991	Point Break	distribution only, produced by Largo Entertainment and Johnny Utah Productions
July 19, 1991	Dutch	co-production with Hughes Entertainment
July 31, 1991	Hot Shots!	
August 14, 1991	The Commitments	Nominated for the Golden Globe Award for Best Motion Picture – Musical or Comedy. USA/UK/Germany distribution only, produced by Beacon Communications, First Film Company and Dirty Hands Productions
August 21, 1991	Barton Fink	Winner of the Palme d'Or. North American distribution only; distributed internationally by Manifesto Film Sales; produced by Circle Films
September 13, 1991	A Matter of Degrees	USA theatrical distribution only; produced by Backbeat Productions and Fox Lorber Features
October 4, 1991	The Super	distribution only; produced by Largo Entertainment and The Superintendent Productions
November 1, 1991	29th Street	
November 22, 1991	For the Boys	
December 22, 1991	Grand Canyon	
December 27, 1991	Naked Lunch	USA distribution only; produced by Recorded Picture Company

== 1992 ==
Release date	Title	Notes
January 31, 1992	Shining Through	co-production with Peter V. Miller Investment Corp. and Sandollar Productions
February 7, 1992	Back in the USSR	distribution only; produced by Largo International N.V.
February 21, 1992	This Is My Life	co-production with Frostback Productions
March 13, 1992	My Cousin Vinny	co-production with Peter V. Miller Investment Corp.
March 27, 1992	White Men Can't Jump	
April 10, 1992	FernGully: The Last Rainforest	distribution only; produced by FAI Films and Youngheart Productions
May 1, 1992	Folks!	distribution only; produced by Penta Pictures
May 22, 1992	Alien 3	co-production with Brandywine Productions
June 26, 1992	Unlawful Entry	distribution only; produced by Largo Entertainment
July 10, 1992	Prelude to a Kiss	
July 17, 1992	Man Trouble	distribution only; produced by Penta Pictures
July 31, 1992	Buffy the Vampire Slayer	
August 21, 1992	Rapid Fire	
August 26, 1992	Storyville	U.S. theatrical distribution only; produced by Davis Entertainment
September 18, 1992	Jumpin' at the Boneyard	co-production with Kasdan Pictures and Boneyard Productions, Inc.
September 25, 1992	The Last of the Mohicans	North American distribution only
October 16, 1992	Night and the City	co-production with Penta Pictures and TriBeCa Productions
November 13, 1992	Love Potion No. 9	
November 20, 1992	Home Alone 2: Lost in New York	co-production with Hughes Entertainment
December 16, 1992	Used People	distribution only, produced by Largo Entertainment and U.P. Productions
December 18, 1992	Toys	
December 25, 1992	Hoffa	

== 1993 ==
Release date	Title	Notes
February 5, 1993	The Vanishing	co-production with Argos Communications
March 5, 1993	Best of the Best 2	distribution only; produced by The Movie Group
March 17, 1993	Teenage Mutant Ninja Turtles III	International distribution only; produced by Mirage Studios and Golden Harvest; New Line Cinema handled U.S. distribution rights
March 26, 1993	Hear No Evil	USA distribution only
April 2, 1993	Jack the Bear	
April 7, 1993	The Sandlot	co-production with Island World
May 21, 1993	Hot Shots! Part Deux	
June 18, 1993	Once Upon a Forest	distribution only; produced by Hanna-Barbera Productions and HTV Television
July 7, 1993	Rookie of the Year	
July 28, 1993	Robin Hood: Men in Tights	North America distribution only; co-production with Gaumont and Brooksfilms; Columbia TriStar Film Distributors International handled international distribution rights
July 30, 1993	Rising Sun	
August 27, 1993	Only the Strong	USA distribution only, co-production with Freestone Pictures, Davis Films and August Entertainment
September 24, 1993	The Good Son	
October 1, 1993	Freaked	
October 15, 1993	The Beverly Hillbillies	
November 24, 1993	Mrs. Doubtfire	co-production with Blue Wolf Productions
December 29, 1993	Ghost in the Machine	

== 1994 ==
Release date	Title	Notes
February 25, 1994	Sugar Hill	USA distribution only, produced by Beacon Communications
March 4, 1994	The Chase	USA distribution only; produced by Capitol Films
April 22, 1994	Bad Girls	
April 29, 1994	PCU	
June 10, 1994	Speed	co-production with The Mark Gordon Company
July 1, 1994	Baby's Day Out	co-production with Hughes Entertainment
July 15, 1994	True Lies	North America/Mexico/France/Italy distribution only; co-production with Lightstorm Entertainment; Universal Pictures handled international distribution rights
August 5, 1994	Airheads	co-production with Island World and Robert Simonds Productions
August 6, 1994	Street Fighter II: The Animated Movie	International distribution only in countries outside Japan, UK, France and Spain.
September 30, 1994	The Scout	
November 18, 1994	Miracle on 34th Street	co-production with Hughes Entertainment and Fox Family Films
November 23, 1994	The Pagemaster	North American distribution only; co-production with Turner Feature Animation
December 2, 1994	Trapped in Paradise	
December 23, 1994	Nell	Nominated for the Golden Globe Award for Best Motion Picture – Drama. North American/Brazil/Argentina distribution only; produced by PolyGram Filmed Entertainment and Egg Pictures

== 1995 ==
Release date	Title	Notes
January 13, 1995	Far from Home: The Adventures of Yellow Dog	co-production with Fox Family Films
March 17, 1995	Bye Bye Love	
April 21, 1995	Kiss of Death	co-production with Mace Neufeld Productions
May 5, 1995	French Kiss	North American distribution only; co-production with PolyGram Filmed Entertainment, Working Title Films and Prufrock Pictures
May 19, 1995	Die Hard with a Vengeance	North America/Japan distribution only; co-production with Cinergi Pictures
May 24, 1995	Braveheart	Winner of the Academy Award for Best Picture. International distribution only; co-production with Icon Productions and The Ladd Company; Paramount Pictures handled North American distribution rights
June 30, 1995	Mighty Morphin Power Rangers: The Movie	co-production with Fox Family Films, Saban Entertainment and Toei Company
July 14, 1995	Nine Months	co-production with 1492 Pictures
August 4, 1995	Bushwhacked	co-production with Fox Family Films
August 11, 1995	A Walk in the Clouds	co-production with Zucker Brothers Productions
August 11, 1995	Asterix Conquers America	France and UK distribution only; produced by Extrafilm Produktion GmbH
October 13, 1995	Strange Days	North America/France/Italy distribution only; co-production with Lightstorm Entertainment; Universal Pictures handled international distribution rights
December 22, 1995	Waiting to Exhale	

== 1996 ==
Release date	Title	Notes
January 12, 1996	Dunston Checks In	co-production with Fox Family Films
February 9, 1996	Broken Arrow	co-production with The Mark Gordon Company
March 1, 1996	Down Periscope	
April 26, 1996	The Truth About Cats & Dogs	co-production with Noon Attack
May 3, 1996	The Great White Hype	co-production with Fred Berner Films and Altman Entertainment
June 14, 1996	Stealing Beauty	distribution outside France; produced by Fox Searchlight Pictures, Recorded Picture Company and UGC Images
July 3, 1996	Independence Day	co-production with Centropolis Entertainment; not to be confused with the unrelated 1983 film of the same name
July 12, 1996	Courage Under Fire	produced by Fox 2000 Pictures; co-production with Davis Entertainment, Joseph M. Singer Entertainment and Friendly Films
August 2, 1996	Chain Reaction	co-production with The Zanuck Company and Chicago Pacific Entertainment
October 4, 1996	That Thing You Do!	co-production with Clavius Base
November 1, 1996	Romeo + Juliet	co-production with Bazmark Productions
November 22, 1996	Jingle All the Way	co-production with Fox Family Films and 1492 Pictures
November 27, 1996	The Crucible	
December 20, 1996	One Fine Day	produced by Fox 2000 Pictures; co-production with Lynda Obst Productions and Via Rosa Productions

== 1997 ==
Release date	Title	Notes
March 28, 1997	Turbo: A Power Rangers Movie	co-production with Fox Family Films, Saban Entertainment and Toei Company
April 4, 1997	Inventing the Abbotts	produced by Fox 2000 Pictures; co-production with Imagine Entertainment
April 25, 1997	Volcano	produced by Fox 2000 Pictures; co-production with Moritz Original and Shuler Donner/Donner Productions
June 13, 1997	Speed 2: Cruise Control	co-production with Blue Tulip Productions
July 2, 1997	Out to Sea	co-production with Davis Entertainment, Joseph M. Singer Entertainment and Friendly Films
August 1, 1997	Picture Perfect	
September 26, 1997	The Edge	co-production with Art Linson Productions
September 26, 1997	Soul Food	produced by Fox 2000 Pictures; co-production with State Street Pictures
October 24, 1997	A Life Less Ordinary	US/Brazil/Argentina/India/Japan/Korea distribution only; co-production with PolyGram Filmed Entertainment, Figment Films and Channel Four Films
November 7, 1997	Cold Around the Heart	co-production with Baumgarten-Prophet Entertainment, Illusion Entertainment and The Kushner-Locke Company
November 14, 1997	Anastasia	co-production with Fox Family Films and Fox Animation Studios
November 26, 1997	Alien Resurrection	co-production with Brandywine Productions
December 12, 1997	Home Alone 3	co-production with Fox Family Films and Hughes Entertainment
December 18, 1997	The Wiggles Movie	Australia distributor; co-production with Gladusaurus Productions; HIT Entertainment handled U.S. distribution on direct-to-video
December 19, 1997	Titanic	Winner of the Academy Award for Best Picture. Winner of the Golden Globe Award for Best Motion Picture – Drama. Inducted into the National Film Registry in 2017. International distribution only; co-production with Paramount Pictures and Lightstorm Entertainment

== 1998 ==
Release date	Title	Notes
January 9, 1998	Firestorm	
January 30, 1998	Great Expectations	co-production with Art Linson Productions
February 20, 1998	Dangerous Beauty	Renamed as The Greatest Courtesan in the United Kingdom and A Destiny of Her Own in some regions; International distribution only; produced by Regency Enterprises and Bedford Falls Productions; Warner Bros. Pictures handled North America & United Kingdom distribution rights
March 27, 1998	The Newton Boys	co-production with Detour Filmproduction
March 27, 1998	No Looking Back	International distribution only; co-production with PolyGram Filmed Entertainment, Good Machine, Marlboro Road Gang and South Fork Pictures; Gramercy Pictures handled North American distribution rights.
April 17, 1998	The Object of My Affection	
May 15, 1998	Bulworth	Nominated for the Golden Globe Award for Best Motion Picture – Musical or Comedy. co-production with Mulholland Productions
May 29, 1998	Hope Floats	co-production with Fortis Films
June 19, 1998	The X-Files	co-production with Ten Thirteen Productions
June 26, 1998	Dr. Dolittle	co-production with Davis Entertainment, Joseph M. Singer Entertainment and Friendly Films
July 15, 1998	There's Something About Mary	Nominated for the Golden Globe Award for Best Motion Picture – Musical or Comedy. co-production with Conundrum Entertainment
July 29, 1998	Ever After: A Cinderella Story	co-production with Fox Family Films and Flower Films
August 14, 1998	How Stella Got Her Groove Back	NAACP Image Award for Outstanding Motion Picture
November 6, 1998	The Siege	co-production with Lynda Obst Productions
November 6, 1998	A Cool, Dry Place	produced by Fox 2000 Pictures
December 25, 1998	The Thin Red Line	Nominated for the Academy Award for Best Picture. Nominated for Critics' Choice Movie Award for Best Picture. produced by Fox 2000 Pictures; co-production with Phoenix Pictures and Geisler-Roberdau

== 1999 ==
Release date	Title	Notes
February 5, 1999	Simply Irresistible	distribution only, produced by Regency Enterprises
February 19, 1999	Office Space	co-production with Judgemental Films
March 12, 1999	Wing Commander	distribution only; produced by Digital Anvil and Origin Systems
March 19, 1999	Ravenous	produced by Fox 2000 Pictures; co-production with Heyday Films
April 9, 1999	Never Been Kissed	produced by Fox 2000 Pictures; co-production with Flower Films and Bushwood Pictures
April 23, 1999	Pushing Tin	produced by Fox 2000 Pictures; co-production with Regency Enterprises
April 30, 1999	Entrapment	co-production with Regency Enterprises
May 19, 1999	Star Wars: Episode I – The Phantom Menace	distribution only; produced by Lucasfilm
July 16, 1999	Lake Placid	produced by Fox 2000 Pictures; co-production with Phoenix Pictures and Stan Winston Studios
August 13, 1999	Brokedown Palace	produced by Fox 2000 Pictures
October 1, 1999	Drive Me Crazy	
October 15, 1999	Fight Club	produced by Fox 2000 Pictures; co-production with Regency Enterprises and Art Linson Productions
November 10, 1999	Light It Up	produced by Fox 2000 Pictures
November 12, 1999	Anywhere but Here	produced by Fox 2000 Pictures
December 17, 1999	Anna and the King	produced by Fox 2000 Pictures; co-production with Lawrence Bender Productions
