= K-9 (film) =

1989 film by Rod Daniel

- Theatrical release poster
- Directed by: Rod Daniel
- Written by: Steven Siegel; Scott Myers
- Produced by: Lawrence Gordon; Charles Gordon
- Starring: James Belushi; Jerry Lee; Mel Harris
- Cinematography: Dean Semler
- Edited by: Lois Freeman-Fox
- Music by: Miles Goodman
- Production company: Gordon Company
- Distributed by: Universal Pictures
- Release date: April 28, 1989
- Running time: 102 minutes
- Country: United States
- Language: English
- Box office: $43.2 million

K-9 is a 1989 American buddy cop action comedy film starring Jim Belushi and Mel Harris. It was directed by Rod Daniel, written by Steven Siegel and Scott Myers, produced by Lawrence Gordon and Charles Gordon, and released by Universal Pictures.

Belushi plays bad-tempered San Diego police detective Michael Dooley, who has been tagged for execution by a major international drug dealer named Ken Lyman (played by Kevin Tighe). To help, K-9 Sergeant Brannigan (played by Ed O'Neill) gives Dooley an unorthodox drug-sniffing police dog called "Jerry Lee" (named after rock-and-roll singer Jerry Lee Lewis). The duo attempt to put Lyman behind bars but Dooley quickly learns Jerry Lee is a mischievous smart aleck who works only when and how he wants to. Many of the film's gags revolve around Jerry Lee's playfully destructive episodes.

The film was followed by a K-9 film series, including two direct-to-video sequels, K-911 (1999) and K-9: P.I. (2002); as well as a television spin-off film titled K-9000, that was intended to be the pilot episode to a TV series that was not ordered.

== Plot ==
San Diego Police Detective Michael Dooley leaves his police car during a stakeout to contact his girlfriend, Tracy, when a helicopter attacks and destroys the car. At the police station, Dooley confides to his lieutenant, Byers, that the attack was likely ordered by Ken Lyman, the drug lord Dooley has been after for two years, but Dooley still insists on working alone, in spite of Byers’ attempts to get him a partner.

Following a tip regarding an informant, Freddie, he spends the night in his personal car. The next morning, Dooley coerces Freddie into revealing that Lyman did order the attack and giving a tip about a warehouse where Lyman's drugs are, but its large size makes them impossible to find. After helping out in a tricky drug bust, Dooley asks his colleague Brannigan to loan him a K-9 to track down the drugs. Brannigan gets Dooley an experienced yet quirky German Shepherd Dog named Jerry Lee.

Dooley and Jerry Lee head to the warehouse where the search is unsuccessful - Jerry Lee initially ignores Dooley's orders, and only a marijuana joint is eventually found. However, at a pub where Dooley stakes out an intermediary, Benny the Mule, Jerry Lee saves Dooley when his cover is blown. With the dog's help, Dooley subdues Benny and learns the location of Lyman's next shipment. Meanwhile, Lyman kills Freddie and demands that his henchman Dillon kill Dooley before the shipment arrives.

At Dooley's apartment, Jerry Lee steals the spotlight after Tracy accepts Dooley's story that he rescued the dog from the streets. The next day, Dooley and Jerry Lee bond when they eat together and spy on Lyman. The two are nearly killed when someone shoots at them, and they chase the assailant to an empty building. Jerry Lee leads Dooley to the man, who falls to his death. In the man's car, Dooley finds a clue that leads him to an auto-dealer shop. There, Jerry Lee identifies a red Mercedes with drugs in it, and Dooley learns that Halstead, the owner of the dealership, works for Lyman. Later, Jerry Lee falls in love with a poodle, to the disapproval of its owner.

When Dooley returns home, he discovers that Lyman has kidnapped Tracy. Infuriated, he crashes a party at Lyman's mansion, prompting him to be arrested by his own department, but Dooley informs Byers that this was intentional to fool Lyman into rushing the shipment. Byers, however, takes Dooley in. Using Jerry Lee's flatulence to an advantage, Dooley escapes with the dog. As Dooley tells Jerry Lee how he met Tracy, he spots a truck driven by Halstead that is pulling a trailer with the red Mercedes. Dooley and Jerry Lee chase the truck and arrest Halstead.

Dooley takes the truck to the desert where Lyman, with Tracy being held hostage in his limo, is waiting. Using his videogame as a fake detonator, Dooley goads Lyman to surrender Tracy or risk the truck exploding and earning the ire of the main buyer, Gilliam. The game blows Dooley's cover, however, and a shootout ensues where Dooley kills Dillon as Jerry Lee chases Lyman. Unable to outrun the dog, Lyman shoots Jerry Lee. Enraged, Dooley shoots at Lyman but Lyman is instead shot and killed by Gilliam's henchmen. Dooley and Tracy rush Jerry Lee to a hospital, where the reluctant surgeon operates. In the recovery room, Dooley delivers a eulogy to Jerry Lee, then discovers that he is alive.

Taking a break from police work, Dooley, Tracy, Jerry Lee, and a poodle spend a vacation together in Las Vegas.

== Cast ==
- Jim Belushi as Detective Michael Dooley
- Mel Harris as Tracy
- Kevin Tighe as Ken Lyman
- Ed O'Neill as K-9 Sergeant Brannigan
- James Handy as Lieutenant Roger Byers
- Sherman Howard as Dillon
- Daniel Davis as Halstead
- Cotter Smith as Gilliam
- John Snyder as Freddie
- Pruitt Taylor Vince as Benny "The Mule"
- David Haskell as Doctor
- Alan Blumenfeld as Salesman
- William Sadler as Don
- Marjorie Bransfield as Receptionist
- Jerry Levine as Ernie
- Dan Castellaneta as Maitre D'
- Wendel Meldrum as Pretty Girl
- John Castellanos as Rolls Royce Man

The role of "Jerry Lee", though credited in the movie credits as being played by Jerry Lee, was actually played by more than one dog, including backups and stand-ins.

== Production ==
K-9 was filmed in and around the San Diego and San Fernando Valley areas of California from August to October 1988. Locations included the Hotel del Coronado in Coronado, and the Golden Hill Cafe in the Golden Hill neighborhood.

== Music ==
- "Main Title (Theme from Jaws)"
  Music composed by John Williams / Courtesy of MCA Records
- "Iko Iko"
  Written by Barbara Ann Hawkins (as Hawkins), Joe Jones (as Jones), Rosa Lee Hawkins (as Hawkins), Marilyn Jones (as Johnson), Sharon Jones (as Jones) and Jessie Thomas (as Thomas) of The Dixie Cups / Performed by Amy Holland
- "I Got You (I Feel Good)"
  Written by James Brown / Performed by James Brown / Courtesy of PolyGram Special Products, a division of PolyGram Records, Inc.
- "Oh Yeah"
  Written by Boris Blank and Dieter Meier / Performed by Yello / Courtesy of PolyGram Special Products, a division of PolyGram Records, Inc.
- "Car Wash"
  Written by Norman Whitfield / Performed by Rose Royce / Courtesy of MCA Records

== Reception ==
On Rotten Tomatoes, which aggregates both contemporary and modern reviews, the film has an approval rating of 36% based on 11 reviews, with an average rating of 4.6/10. On Metacritic it has a score of 44% based on reviews from 11 critics, indicating "mixed or average" reviews. Audiences surveyed by CinemaScore gave the film a grade A− on scale of A to F.

Kevin Thomas of the Los Angeles Times praised the actors but not the routine plot. Thomas wrote, "It's enjoyable, thanks not only to its charismatic duo, but also to the skilled comedy direction of Rod Daniel." Stephen Holden of The New York Times stated it has "no shred of credibility", yet contains "cutesy, surefire dog tricks" and a "breezy pacing". Roger Ebert of the Chicago Sun-Times gave the film "2 stars". Rita Kempley of The Washington Post complimented Jerry Lee's performance.

== Sequels ==
K-911 is a 1999 American buddy cop action-comedy sequel film released direct-to-video. It was directed by Charles T. Kanganis and stars James Belushi as Detective Michael Dooley.

K-9: P.I. is a 2002 American buddy cop action-comedy sequel film released direct-to-video. It was directed by Richard J. Lewis and stars James Belushi as Detective Michael Dooley.

K-9000 is a 1991 American science fiction crime action spin-off film released as television film. It was directed by Kim Manners and stars Chris Mulkey as Detective Eddie Monroe.

== Home media ==
K-9 was released to home video in early 1990, followed by a DVD release 16 years later, on October 24, 2006. It was re-released along with its sequels in a collection as "K-9: The Patrol Pack" on January 17, 2010.

It was initially released on Blu-ray disc in the U.K. in 2017 by Fabulous Films and then in the United States on May 15, 2018.

== See also ==
- List of media set in San Diego
