= Lawrence Gordon (producer) =

American film producer (born 1936)

- Born: March 25, 1936 (age 90); Mississippi, U.S.
- Education: Tulane University
- Occupations: Producer, executive
- Years active: 1964–present
- Children: 3
- Relatives: Charles Gordon (brother)

Lawrence A. Gordon (born March 25, 1936) is an American producer and motion picture executive. He specializes in producing action-oriented films and other genres. Some of his most popular productions include 48 Hours (1982), Predator (1987), Die Hard (1988), Die Hard 2 (1990), Predator 2 (1990), Point Break (1991), Boogie Nights (1997), Lara Croft: Tomb Raider (2001), Hellboy (2004), and Watchmen (2009).

== Early life and education ==
Gordon was born on March 25, 1936, in Yazoo City or Belzoni, Mississippi and raised in a Jewish family in Belzoni. He graduated from Tulane University in New Orleans.

== Career ==
After moving to Los Angeles, he began his producing career in 1964, working for Aaron Spelling, and became a writer and associate producer on the TV series Burke's Law. He quickly moved up the ranks and worked as an executive producer at ABC and at Screen Gems.

In early 1968, Gordon joined American International Pictures. In August 1969, he was named vice president for motion picture and film development. He resigned in February 1970 to form his own company. In 1971 Gordon went to Screen Gems, and he returned to AIP in January 1972 as head of production. Among the films released under his auspices were Slaughter and Boxcar Bertha. He received credit as executive producer on John Milius's Dillinger (1973).

Gordon left as worldwide production head in early 1974 to form his own company and did a deal with Columbia Pictures. Its first film was Hard Times (1975). It was written and directed by Walter Hill, who then collaborated with Gordon on a short-lived TV series, Dog and Cat. After a stint at Columbia, he moved to Paramount Pictures in the late 1970s to develop ideas, mainly for the unmade Paramount Television Service, while also working on blockbusters under the deal like The Warriors. In 1978, he had two high-grossing films with Hooper and The End, both starring Burt Reynolds. Gordon and Walter Hill were going to make The Last Gun, but the film was cancelled because of poor financing. The Warriors was created instead. In the early 1980s, he created the TV series Matt Houston. Gordon worked on multiple films in the 1970s and 1980s with fellow producer Joel Silver, most notably Streets of Fire and 48 Hrs.

In July 1984, he replaced Joe Wizan as head of production at 20th Century Fox. Two months later, he was appointed president of Fox Entertainment Group. In January 1986, he resigned as president and chief operating officer, citing poor health due to a heart condition. He was planning to reactivate Lawrence Gordon Productions in a two-year independent production deal with the studio. For three years, from 1986 until its founding of Largo Entertainment in 1989, Lawrence Gordon Productions was based at 20th Century Fox, sometimes heading under the name The Gordon Company, when he was with his brother Charles Gordon.

In 1989, he produced Field of Dreams, which received an Academy Award nomination for Best Picture. He subsequently formed Largo, backed by the Japanese company JVC. Gordon used his production company Golar (Golar, Inc.; credited in films as Golar Productions) to enter the Largo joint venture with JVC and BOH, Inc. Largo developed films that were distributed by studios such as 20th Century Fox under the "Largo Agreement". He left Largo in 1994 to sign a deal with Universal Pictures. At that time, The Gordon Company was restructured: Golar continued in tandem with Lawrence Gordon Productions (headed by Lawrence Gordon), while Daybreak Productions was headed by Charles Gordon. Both Larry and Chuck produced together one last time under the banner of The Gordon Company on Waterworld.

Gordon also had an independent production deal with Universal Pictures under the name Lawrence Gordon Productions. Under Lawrence Gordon Productions, he produced Jumpin' Jack Flash, Boogie Nights, Mystery Men, K-9, Lara Croft: Tomb Raider, Hellboy and its sequel The Golden Army, and Watchmen.

== Selected filmography ==
He was a producer in all films unless otherwise noted.

=== Film ===
==== As producer ====
Year	Film	Credit	Notes
1973	Dillinger	Executive producer	
1975	Hard Times		
1977	Rolling Thunder	Executive producer	
1978	The End		
1978	The Driver		
1978	Hooper	Executive producer	
1979	The Warriors		
1980	Xanadu		
1981	Paternity		
1982	Jekyll and Hyde... Together Again		
1982	48 Hrs.		
1984	Streets of Fire		
1985	Brewster's Millions		
1986	Jumpin' Jack Flash		
1987	Predator		
1988	The Couch Trip		
1988	The Wrong Guys	Executive producer	
1988	Die Hard		
1989	Leviathan	Executive producer	
1989	Field of Dreams		
1989	K-9		
1989	Lock Up		
1989	Family Business		
1990	Another 48 Hrs.		
1990	Die Hard 2		
1990	Predator 2		
1991	The Rocketeer		
1995	Waterworld		
1997	The Devil's Own		
1997	Event Horizon		
1997	Boogie Nights	Executive producer	
1999	Mystery Men		
1999	K-911	Executive producer	Direct-to-video
1999	Thieves		
2001	Lara Croft: Tomb Raider		
2001	K-PAX		
2002	K-9: P.I.	Executive producer	Direct-to-video
2003	Lara Croft: Tomb Raider – The Cradle of Life		
2004	Hellboy		
2008	Hellboy II: The Golden Army		
2009	Watchmen		
2009	Under the Hood	Executive producer	Direct-to-video
2009	Tales of the Black Freighter	Executive producer	Direct-to-video
2019	Hellboy		
2022	Prey	Executive producer	
2024	Watchmen: Chapter I	Executive producer	
2024	Watchmen: Chapter II	Executive producer	
2025	Predator: Killer of Killers	Executive producer	
2025	Predator: Badlands	Executive producer	

==== As writer ====
Year	Film	Credit
1969	The Devil's 8	Story

==== As an actor ====
Year	Film	Role
1971	The Christian Licorice Store	Hollywood Party Guest

==== Miscellaneous crew ====
Year	Film	Role
1991	Point Break	President: Largo Entertainment
1992	Back in the USSR	President: Largo Entertainment
1992	Unlawful Entry	President: Largo Entertainment
1992	Dr. Giggles	President: Largo Entertainment
1992	Used People	President: Largo Entertainment Presenter
1994	Timecop	President: Largo Entertainment
1995	Waterworld	Presenter
1997	The Devil's Own	Presenter
1997	Event Horizon	Presenter
1999	Mystery Men	Presenter

==== Thanks ====
Year	Film	Role
2020	Da 5 Bloods	Special thanks

=== Television ===
==== As producer ====
Year	Title	Credit	Notes
1971	The Point		Television film
1975	The Missing Are Deadly	Executive producer	Television film
1975	Home Cookin'	Executive producer	Television film
1977	Dog and Cat	Executive producer	Television pilot
1977	Dog and Cat	Executive producer	
1978	Lacy and the Mississippi Queen	Executive producer	Television film
1979	The Nightingales	Executive producer	Television film
1980	Stunts Unlimited	Executive producer	Television film
1982	The Renegades	Executive producer	Television pilot
1983	The Renegades	Executive producer	
1983	Just Our Luck	Executive producer	
1983	Lone Star	Executive producer	Television film
1984	The Streets	Executive producer	Television film
1982−85	Matt Houston	Executive producer	
1985	Our Family Honor	Executive producer	
1997	Timecop	Executive producer	
2006	Hellboy: Sword of Storms	Executive producer	Television film
2007	Hellboy: Blood and Iron	Executive producer	Television film
2019	Watchmen	Consulting producer	
2023	Bill Russell: Legend	Executive producer	Documentary
TBA	The Warriors	Executive producer	Future series
TBA	Field of Dreams	Executive producer	Future series

==== As writer ====
Year	Title	Notes
1965	Burke's Law	Teleplays (2 episodes)
1967−68	The Guns of Will Sonnett	Teleplays (2 episodes)
1969−70	The New People	Creator
1971	Five Desperate Women	Story; television film
1982	The Renegades	Story; television pilot
1983	The Renegades	Creator
1983	Just Out Luck	Creator
1982−84	Matt Houston	Creator
1985−86	Our Family Honor	Creator
