= K-9000 =

1991 American science fiction crime action television film

- Promotional release poster
- Based on: K-9 by Steven Siegel & Scott Myers
- Written by: Steven E. de Souza; Michael Part
- Directed by: Kim Manners
- Starring: Chris Mulkey; Catherine Oxenberg; Dennis Haysbert
- Music by: Jan Hammer
- Country of origin: United States
- Original language: English

Production
- Producers: J. Rickley Dumm; Michael Part; Steven E. de Souza; Charles Fries
- Cinematography: Frank Raymond
- Editor: J.P. Farrell
- Running time: 96 minutes
- Production companies: De Souza Productions; Fries Entertainment

Original release
- Network: Fox
- Release: July 1, 1991

Related
- K-9 (1989); K-911 (1999)

K-9000 is a 1991 American science fiction crime action television film starring Chris Mulkey, Catherine Oxenberg, Dennis Haysbert, and Judson Scott. It is the second installment in the K-9 film series, originally intended to serve as a pilot episode for a television series that was based on and serves as a spin-off of K-9. It was directed by Kim Manners and written by Michael Part and Steven E. de Souza.

== Plot ==
Dr. Aja Turner (Catherine Oxenberg), a beautiful female scientist, implants a computer in a German Shepherd's brain to help it track and capture criminals. Crooks, led by Anton Zeiss (Judson Earney Scott), make off with the cybernetic canine. Dr. Turner teams up with Eddie Monroe (Chris Mulkey), a hard-nosed policeman who is implanted with a microchip allowing him to communicate with the dog.

== Cast ==
- Chris Mulkey as Detective Eddie Monroe
- Catherine Oxenberg as Dr. Aja Turner
- Dennis Haysbert as Nick Sanrio
- Dana Gladstone as Captain DeLillo
- Jerry Houser as Niner (voice)
- Judson Earney Scott as Anton Zeiss
- Anne Haney as Mrs. Wiffington
- Tom McFadden as Banks
- David Renan as Gardner
- Ivan E. Roth as Danny
