= Life with Roger =

- Genre: Sitcom
- Created by: Howard Adler; Robert Griffard
- Starring: Mike O'Malley; Maurice Godin; Hallie Todd
- Theme music composer: David Schwartz
- Composers: David Michael Frank; David Schwartz; Don Davis
- Country of origin: United States
- Original language: English
- No. of seasons: 1
- No. of episodes: 20

Production
- Executive producers: Howard Adler; Robert Griffard
- Producers: Deborah Oppenheimer; Tracey Ormandy
- Cinematography: Ken Lamkin; Frank Raymond
- Editors: Richard Candib; Pam Marshall
- Running time: 30 minutes (with commercials)
- Production company: Warner Bros. Television

Original release
- Network: The WB
- Release: August 25, 1996 – March 30, 1997

Life with Roger is an American sitcom television series created by Howard Adler and Robert Griffard, that aired on The WB from August 25, 1996, to March 30, 1997, as part of its 1996–97 schedule.

== Synopsis ==
Life with Roger starred Mike O'Malley as Roger Hoyt, a formerly suicidal homeless young man dissuaded from jumping off of a bridge by Jason Fuller (Maurice Godin), a man whose car had coincidentally broken down on the bridge just before Roger could complete his planned jump. Jason, a medical doctor, talks Roger out of going through with his suicide plan, and Roger repairs his car. They eventually become roommates when Roger talks Jason out of marrying his fiancėe, and typical sitcom mayhem ensues. Hallie Todd co-starred as Jason's sister, Lanie Clark, and Meredith Scott Lynn played Myra, Jason's former fiancée.

The series premiered on August 25, 1996, airing twenty episodes, before being canceled in March 1997 due to low ratings.

== Cast ==
- Mike O'Malley as Roger Hoyt
- Maurice Godin as Jason Fuller
- Hallie Todd as Lanie Clark

=== Recurring ===
- Meredith Scott Lynn as Myra
- Heather Paige Kent as Kate

== Episodes ==
No.	Title	Directed by	Written by	Original release date	Prod. code	Viewers (millions)
1	"Pilot"	Barnet Kellman	Robert Griffard & Howard Adler	August 25, 1996	475107	3.5
2	"The Day After"	Rod Daniel	Unknown	September 15, 1996	465651	2.8
3	"The Stereo"	Rod Daniel	Unknown	September 22, 1996	465652	2.6
4	"The Foosball Connection"	Rod Daniel	Unknown	September 29, 1996	465653	2.9
5	"Breaking in is Hard to Do"	Robby Benson	Unknown	October 6, 1996	465655	4.5
6	"First Date"	Rich Correll	Unknown	October 13, 1996	465654	3.0
7	"Love Thy Neighbor"	Rod Daniel	Unknown	October 27, 1996	465656	4.0
8	"The Way We Was"	Rod Daniel	Unknown	November 3, 1996	465657	2.7
9	"Is There a Doctor in the House?"	James Hampton	Unknown	November 10, 1996	465658	3.4
10	"Working Girl"	Unknown	Unknown	November 17, 1996	465659	3.7
11	"Last Tango"	Rich Correll	Unknown	December 15, 1996	465660	2.6
12	"The Apartment"	Steve Zuckerman	Unknown	January 5, 1997	465661	3.11
13	"The Landlady"	Rich Correll	David Hoge & Dan Cross	January 12, 1997	465662	2.67
14	"About Last Night"	Gerry Cohen	Rob Hammersley & Todd J. Greenwald	January 19, 1997	465663	4.31
15	"The New Boyfriend"	Steve Zuckerman	Story by : Bob Keyes & Doug Keyes; Teleplay by : Adam Cohen	March 2, 1997	465664	2.93
16	"The Man with the Golden Charm"	Rod Daniel	Rick Hawkins & Nancylee Myatt	March 3, 1997	465667	3.41
17	"A Fight to Remember"	Rod Daniel	David Hoge & Dan Cross	March 9, 1997	465665	2.96
18	"Toy Story"	Steve Zuckerman	Barry Gold	March 16, 1997	465669	3.38
19	"Dial M for Muffin"	Shelley Jensen	Rob Hammersley & Todd J. Greenwald	March 23, 1997	465668	3.06
20	"The Boxer Rebellion"	Rod Daniel	Adam Cohen	March 30, 1997	465666	2.77
