= Maurice Godin (actor) =

Canadian actor

- Education: Ryerson Theatre School
- Occupation: Actor
- Years active: 1985–present

Maurice Godin is a Canadian actor who has appeared in several films and television shows.

== Early life and education ==
Godin trained with international teachers and coaches at the Stratford Festival.

== Career ==
Godin's theatre career has taken him from coast to coast across Canada, where he has appeared in the major theaters of almost every province, including the Shaw Festival and the Stratford Shakespearean Festival, garnering critical acclaim for his portrayal of Arturo Ui in Bertolt Brecht's The Resistible Rise of Arturo Ui. Some of Godin's numerous theatre credits include Mercutio in Romeo and Juliet, d'Artagnan in The Three Musketeers, Constantin in The Seagull, Puck in A Midsummer Night's Dream and Rochester in Jane Eyre.

Godin has also performed extensively in musical theatre most notably in the roles of the Emcee in Cabaret, the Master in Godspell, Joey Evans in Pal Joey, Herschel Blackwell in Fire and in an award-winning performance of Screamin' John in John Gray's Rock and Roll. He also portrayed Edmund in King Lear, starring Christopher Plummer. Godin was a cast member of the Broadway show, The Farnsworth Invention, written by Aaron Sorkin and directed by Des MacNuff.

Among his many television credits, Godin has guest-starred on Still Standing, The Practice, Ally McBeal, Friends, The Outer Limits and Seinfeld. He has also played recurring characters on Poltergeist: The Legacy, 3rd Rock from the Sun, First Monday and Spin City. Godin has been a series regular on Café Americain, Life with Roger, and Working. His feature film work includes such Canadian films as White Room, Salt Water Moose, and Double Take. Godin played the flamboyant role of Hector in the film Boat Trip (2003), followed by guest roles on Medical Investigation, House, Las Vegas as well as a comic turn as Wesley the burglar in the film Chestnut: (Hero of Central Park). He has also portrayed the French composer Georges Bizet in Bizet's Dream.

Godin also guest starred in Disney Channel shows Wizards of Waverly Place as Ronald Longcape Sr. and Good Luck Charlie as Mr. Walsh. Godin is working on a novel inspired by a childhood raised in an Acadian household.

Godin is on faculty at California State University, Northridge, where he teaches performance technique and opera scene study in the opera division of the music department. Godin is also the director of the annual spring or fall operas.

== Filmography ==
=== Film ===
Year	Title	Role	Notes
1990	Where the Heart Is	Stock Exchange Dealer	
1990	White Room	Norm	
1996	Salt Water Moose	Richard	
1997	Double Take	Fritz	
2002	Boat Trip	Hector	
2004	Chestnut: Hero of Central Park	Wesley	
2009	Sniff: The Dog Movie	Derek	

=== Television ===
Year	Title	Role	Notes
1985	Star Wars: Droids	Voice	5 episodes
1988–1994	Street Legal	Various roles	7 episodes
1990	The Campbells	Mr. Phillips	Episode: "Back to School"
1990	Leona Helmsley: The Queen of Mean	Mark	Television film
1990	Bordertown	Jamie McLeod	Episode: "Sons of Thunder"
1990	Katts and Dog	Joe	2 episodes
1991	E.N.G.	Neil Curtis	Episode: "In the Blood"
1993	Secret Service	Andy	Episode: "Larceny Inc./Reach Out and Rob Someone/Jet Threat"
1993	Catwalk	Father James	Episode: "Downtown"
1993	Matrix	Derek Scroll	Episode: "Blindside"
1993–1994	Café Americain	Marcel Coutard	18 episodes
1994	Bizet's Dream	Georges Bizet	Television film
1994	RoboCop	Adam Roland	Episode: "Illusions"
1994	Forever Knight	David Constantine	Episode: "Father's Day"
1994	Seinfeld	Misha	Episode: "The Gymnast"
1994	Ready or Not	John	Episode: "The New Deal"
1995	Vanished	Charles Delaunay	Television film
1995	Wings	Dominic	Episode: "Et Tu, Antonio?"
1995	Lois & Clark: The New Adventures of Superman	Jason T. Mayzik	Episode: "And the Answer Is..."
1995	TekWar	Artie	Episode: "Forget Me Not"
1995	The Awakening	Nigel Bowers	Television film
1996	Goosebumps	Mr. Matthews	2 episodes
1996	Dangerous Offender: The Marlene Moore Story	Michael Copeland	Television film
1996	Traders	O.S.C. Agent Morgan	2 episodes
1996–1997	Life with Roger	Jason Clark	20 episodes
1997	When Secrets Kill	Lt. Larry	Television film
1997	The Practice	John Aikman	Episode: "Make the Mule"
1997, 1998	Poltergeist: The Legacy	Jeffrey Starr	2 episodes
1997–1999	Working	Tim Deale	39 episodes
1998	The Outer Limits	Dr. Noah Phillips	Episode: "The Balance of Nature"
1999	It's Like, You Know...	Zach	Episode: "Arthur 2: On the Rocks"
2000	Spin City	Trevor Wolfe	3 episodes
2000	The Geena Davis Show	Jonah	Episode: "Jealousy"
2000	The Fearing Mind	Frank K. Isaac	Episode: "Come to Papa"
2001	3rd Rock from the Sun	Marty	2 episodes
2001	First Years	Emmanuel McDougal	Episode: "There's No Place Like Homo"
2001	Ally McBeal	Mr. Kensington	Episode: "Queen Bee"
2001	Alias	SD-6 Agent Fisher	Episode: "Reckoning"
2002	The Chronicle	Dumont	Episode: "Hot from the Oven"
2002	Friends	Sid	2 episodes
2002	Still Standing	Paul	Episode: "Pilot"
2004	Medical Investigation	Dr. John Bender	Episode: "Price of Pleasure"
2005	Las Vegas	Steindorf	Episode: "Sperm Whales and Spearmint Rhinos"
2005	Monk	Pierre LaCoste	Episode: "Mr. Monk Gets Drunk"
2005–2006	Threshold	Ed Whitaker	3 episodes
2005–2011	House	Dr. Hourani	4 episodes
2006	Malcolm in the Middle	Car Dealer	Episode: "Hal Grieves"
2007	Jericho	Interviewer	Episode: "The Day Before"
2007	The ½ Hour News Hour	Liquor Store Owner	Episode #1.9
2007	Tell Me You Love Me	—N/a	Episode #1.3
2008	Wizards of Waverly Place	Ronald Longcape Sr.	2 episodes
2010	Nurse Jeffrey: Bitch Tapes	Dr. Hourani	2 episodes
2010	Den Brother	Professor Pearson	Television film
2010	Good Luck Charlie	Paul Walsh	Episode: "Charlie Goes Viral"
2010	Law & Order: LA	Mark Duffy	Episode: "Ballona Creek"
2011	Suits	George	Episode: "Errors and Omissions"
2016	Modern Family	Lester	Episode: "Grab It"
