= Straight from the Heart (2003 film) =

- DVD cover
- Genre: Drama; Romance
- Written by: Pamela Wallace
- Directed by: David S. Cass Sr.
- Starring: Teri Polo; Andrew McCarthy
- Music by: Mader
- Country of origin: United States
- Original language: English

Production
- Producers: Kevin Bocarde; Larry Levinson; Michael Moran
- Cinematography: James Wrenn
- Editor: Jennifer Jean Cacavas
- Running time: 100 minutes
- Production companies: Hallmark Entertainment; Larry Levinson Productions

Original release
- Network: Hallmark Channel
- Release: February 9, 2003

Straight from the Heart is a 2003 American made-for-television romantic drama film starring Teri Polo, Andrew McCarthy, Patricia Kalember and Greg Evigan. The film is based on the romance novel by Pamela Wallace and premiered on Hallmark Channel on February 9, 2003.

== Plot ==
Jordan Donovan (Teri Polo), a photographer from New York City, is set up with Tyler Ross (Andrew McCarthy), a Wyoming rancher, after her boyfriend fails to commit. It is arranged by her closest friend in NYC, and his sister through want ads in a magazine.

Jordan flies to Wyoming to meet Tyler, his sister Laurie and her fiancée. Although neither one is initially convinced (Tyler is initially put off by Jordan's city slicker attitude and she senses his hostility), they find themselves drawn to each other.

Jordan is quite a skilled horse-rider, having frequently exercised other people's horses with her father in Upstate New York when she was young. His hostility is an anger at the world and lack of closure for his wife who died with his unborn child in childbirth.

They bond through their shared love of horses and their passion for protecting the wild mustangs on and around his property.

== Cast ==
- Teri Polo as Jordan Donovan
- Andrew McCarthy as Tyler Ross
- Patricia Kalember as Laurie Woods
- Greg Evigan as Edward Morgan
- Christine Tucci as Carla Dimaggio
- David Jean Thomas as Jesse Syms (as David Jean-Thomas)
- J. Kenneth Campbell as Howard Jamison

== Production ==
Filming took place in Northern California.

== Release ==
The film was first screened at the Sarasota Film Festival in 2003. It then premiered on the Hallmark Channel on February 9 of that year. Shortly after its television premiere, the film was made available on DVD with a reissue of DVD copies made available in 2007.
