= Robert Thaler =

American stage and television actor

- Born: October 15, 1959 (age 66); Cedar Rapids, Iowa, U.S.
- Education: University of California, Berkeley (BS)
- Occupations: Stage and television actor

Robert Thaler (born October 15, 1959) is an American stage and television actor. He is best known for playing Pearl Bradford in the American television soap opera Santa Barbara.

== Early life and education ==
Thaler was born in Cedar Rapids, Iowa, and raised in Marion, Iowa. He had a brother and two sisters. He attended the University of California, Berkeley, where he earned a bachelor's degree in mathematics. Seeing a local production of One Flew Over the Cuckoo's Nest inspired him to become an actor, and he began appearing in regional theatres.

== Career ==
Thaler began his screen career in 1983, in the role of "Dancer" in the short-lived ABC crime drama television series The Renegades.

Thaler was seen in a Los Angeles production of a play titled Tamara by Bridget and Jerome Dobson, creators of the NBC television soap opera Santa Barbara. They created the role of Pearl Bradford for him. His character was an eccentric waiter who helped Cruz Castillo (A Martinez) in his investigations, and he joined the cast of Santa Barbara in October 1985. His final appearance on Santa Barbara was in April 1988. He guest-starred in television programs including Hardcastle and McCormick, V, Remington Steele, T.J. Hooker and Hill Street Blues.

== Filmography ==
=== Film ===
Year	Title	Role	Notes
1999	Starry Night	Commentator	

=== Television ===
Year	Title	Role	Notes
1982	The Renegades	Dancer	Television film
1983	The Renegades	Dancer	6 episodes
1983	Remington Steele	Langston Drewes	Episode: "Love Among the Steele"
1984	V	Ensign Daniel	2 episodes
1985	Hill Street Blues	Reporter	Episode: "The Life and Time of Dominic Florio Jr."
1985–1988	Santa Barbara	Pearl	269 episodes
1986	T. J. Hooker	Doug Richards	Episode: "The Night Ripper"
