= C-16: FBI =

American crime drama television series

- Also known as: C-16
- Genre: Crime drama
- Created by: Michael Duggan; Michael M. Robin
- Starring: Eric Roberts; Angie Harmon; Christine Tucci; D. B. Sweeney; Zach Grenier; Michael Cavanaugh; Morris Chestnut
- Composer: David Bergeaud
- Country of origin: United States
- Original language: English
- No. of seasons: 1
- No. of episodes: 13

Production
- Executive producers: Brad Grey; Michael Duggan; Michael M. Robin
- Running time: 60 minutes
- Production companies: Brillstein-Grey Entertainment; Buena Vista Television

Original release
- Network: ABC
- Release: September 27, 1997 – July 2, 1998

C-16: FBI (originally broadcast as C-16) is an American crime drama series that aired on ABC from September 27, 1997 until July 2, 1998.

== Premise ==
C-16 referred to a special unit of the Federal Bureau of Investigation (FBI) that was assigned to the most difficult cases. The unit, based in Los Angeles, was hand-picked by Special Agent in Charge John Olansky (Eric Roberts).

== Characters ==
- John Olansky, Special Agent in Charge (Eric Roberts)
- Special Agent Amanda Reardon (Angie Harmon)
- Special Agent Anne Rooney (Christine Tucci)
- Special Agent Scott Stoddard (D. B. Sweeney)
- Special Agent Jack DiRado (Zach Grenier)
- Special Agent Dennis Grassi (Michael Cavanaugh)
- Special Agent Mal Robinson (Morris Chestnut)

== Episodes ==
No.	Title	Directed by	Written by	Original release date	Prod. code
1	"Pilot: Part 1"	Michael M. Robin	Michael Duggan	September 27, 1997	101
2	"Pilot: Part 2"	Michael M. Robin	Michael Duggan	October 4, 1997	102
3	"Radio FBI"	Michael M. Robin	Story by : Christopher Mack & Michael Duggan; Teleplay by : Christian Williams	October 11, 1997	103
4	"The Sandman"	Davis Guggenheim	Story by : Christian Williams; Teleplay by : Ann Lewis Hamilton & Jeffrey Stepakoff	October 18, 1997	104
5	"Orange Kid"	Rick Wallace	Marjorie David	October 25, 1997	105
6	"Eight Pounds of Pressure"	Paul Shapiro	Patrick Harbinson	November 8, 1997	106
7	"Russian Winter"	Michael M. Robin	Ann Lewis Hamilton	November 29, 1997	107
8	"The Art of War"	Donna Deitch	Patrick Harbinson & Bonnie Mark	May 21, 1998	108
9	"My Brother's Keeper"	James Hayman	Christopher Mack & Jeffery Stepakoff	May 28, 1998	109
10	"Green Card"	Patrick R. Norris	Christopher Mack & Jeffery Stepakoff	June 4, 1998	110
11	"Russian Roulette"	James McDaniel	Marjorie David & Patrick Harbinson	June 11, 1998	111
12	"El Nino"	Matthew Penn	Christian Williams	June 18, 1998	112
13	"Hitting Olansky"	Elodie Keene	Marjorie Davie & Sue Doucette & Ann Lewis Hamilton	July 2, 1998	113

== General and cited sources ==
- Terrace, Vincent. "C-16: FBI" in Encyclopedia of Television Shows, 1925 Through 2007. Jefferson, North Carolina: McFarland & Co., 2008.
