= Rod Daniel =

American film and television director (1942–2016)

- Daniel, c. March 2014
- Born: Rollin Augustus Daniel III; August 4, 1942; Nashville, Tennessee, U.S.
- Died: April 16, 2016 (aged 73); Chicago, Illinois, U.S.
- Education: Battle Ground Academy; Davidson College; Vanderbilt University
- Occupation: Director
- Years active: 1969–2002
- Spouse: Martha Mueller (m. 1965)
- Children: 2

Rollin Augustus "Rod" Daniel III (August 4, 1942 – April 16, 2016) was an American television and film director, active from the late 1960s to the early 2000s. His films include the 1985 Michael J. Fox comedy film Teen Wolf, which was a considerable box office success.

Daniel, the son of a noted surgeon, was expected to follow in his father's footsteps. After returning to his native Tennessee from the Vietnam War, he chose to enter the advertising business, where he directed several commercials before moving to Los Angeles. There, his friendship with television producer Hugh Wilson enabled him to start a career in the television industry as a director and producer for Wilson's sitcom WKRP in Cincinnati. Daniel continued to work on shows like Magnum, P.I. and Newhart, until he eventually grew restless with television following the failure of a sitcom he had worked on and chose to make the leap into feature films.

Daniel continued to direct throughout the 1980s and 1990s, with his other works including the comedies Like Father Like Son, K-9, The Super, and Beethoven's 2nd. He continued to direct episodes of television as well, including shows like Everybody Loves Raymond and Caroline in the City. His final film, Home Alone 4, premiered on television in late 2002, after which he retired from the entertainment industry. Daniel then moved to Tennessee for several years and began refocusing on his passion for photography and music. In later interviews he described his entertainment career in a negative light. Eventually, he moved to Chicago, where he died in April 2016 from complications of Parkinson's disease.

== Early life ==
Daniel was born as Rollin Augustus Daniel III in Nashville, Tennessee on August 4, 1942. His father, Dr. Rollin A. Daniel Jr., was Chief of Cardiothoracic Surgery at Vanderbilt University and a founding member of the American Board of Thoracic Surgery. Rod Daniel attended high school at Battle Ground Academy in Franklin, Tennessee (near Nashville) and graduated in 1960. He was inducted into the school's Alumni Hall of Fame in 2013. He was a student at Davidson College for two years, but then transferred to Vanderbilt University, where he earned a bachelor's degree in economics in 1964. Daniel said that although there was an expectation for him to be like his father, who had also attended Vanderbilt, he chose instead to enter the advertising business after returning to Nashville following his service in the Vietnam War as a lieutenant of the United States Army.

Daniel's first job in advertising was at the Nashville firm of Dawson, Daniels, Sullivan, & Dillon, where he began making commercials for one of their clients, department store chain Cain-Sloan. Daniel soon accepted a job opportunity in Atlanta for a broadcast producer, but he eventually ended up cycling through jobs all over the city before eventually settling at production company Jayan Films. Although Daniel professed he was initially only interested in the business side of the company, he soon began directing commercials for it as well. Daniel then went to Chicago in 1976 to work at Topol, a commercial production company. He directed commercials for companies including Hallmark Cards and Procter & Gamble before heading to Los Angeles about one year later.

== Career ==
While in Los Angeles, Daniel began working alongside television producer Hugh Wilson. Wilson had a new show in development, called WKRP in Cincinnati, and invited Daniel to watch the taping of the pilot. Daniel agreed to come, and while watching the taping, he felt that he "just instinctively knew how to do what they were doing so I pursued it aggressively." Daniel saw an opportunity to leave his job in commercials, and told Wilson that he wanted a job on the show if production went well. Wilson obliged, and gave Daniel the associate producer position. Eventually, he moved up to director, and eventually directed 33 episodes over the series' run. Daniel found the show to be "a great training ground in terms of storyline and character. It really spoils you."

After three years at WKRP, Daniel then directed more episodic television, including episodes of shows like Newhart and Magnum, P.I.. He directed several episodes of The Duck Factory, starring Jim Carrey, but the series was unsuccessful, and Daniel decided to switch to films. In a 1985 interview with The Tennessean, Daniel opined that "On television there is some really good writing, but not much. Television is just a machine, a sausage machine. If you really want to do some quality work, you just don't have time." Daniel changed his agent, something he described as "almost an impossible move", and told them he wanted to make a film.

A month after he changed agents, Daniel received the script to Teen Wolf and enjoyed it. He met with Michael J. Fox and "liked him instantly". According to Daniel, he was hired after every other director interviewed by 20th Century Fox simply said the film was about a werewolf, while Daniel said it was about a father and son. Daniel told the Chicago Tribune that "a whole lot of Teen Wolf is who I wish I could have been, who I wanted my father to be more like." Shot over 25 days, Teen Wolf was a box office success upon its early fall release in 1985, grossing $80 million on a $1.4 million budget. Daniel reflected positively on the film, saying to The Tennessean, "I'm so proud of Teen Wolf. It was a chance for me to start over. It really was a well-written script. It makes a little statement. It's a clean, classy little movie."

After Teen Wolf's success, Daniel began searching for his next project. To The Tennessean, he expressed his desire to be selective with his screenplay choices, something television had not allowed him to do. Daniel's next film was the 1987 comedy Like Father Like Son, a film starring Kirk Cameron and Dudley Moore that again allowed him to explore father-son themes. The film grossed $34 million at the domestic box office. After Like Father, Like Son, he directed the 1989 film K-9, a comedy starring Jim Belushi. Critical reception was mostly negative, but the film grossed $78 million worldwide and spawned two direct-to-video sequels, K-911 and K-9: P.I., both of which featured Belushi reprising his role.

Next, Daniel directed The Super, released in 1991, which starred Joe Pesci as a wealthy superintendent forced to live in one of his own poorly maintained buildings. The film received negative reviews from critics and, produced at a cost of $22 million, failed to recoup its budget at the domestic box office, only taking in $11 million. Roger Ebert criticized Daniel's direction, saying that the cast deserved better, and that Daniel failed to deliver solid comic payoffs. Janet Maslin was more positive and wrote that Daniel's direction was "snappy and broad" and that he offered many opportunities for Pesci to "show off his talents for physical clowning".

The next film directed by Daniel was the 1993 film Beethoven's 2nd, the sequel to the successful comedy film Beethoven. It was his final theatrical film. The film was not a critical success, but it ended up grossing $53 million domestically and $64 million in foreign markets, leading to a total gross of $118 million. "The Day I Fall in Love", an original song performed by James Ingram and Dolly Parton for the film, was nominated for an Academy Award, a Grammy Award, and a Golden Globe.

After Beethoven's 2nd, Daniel signed on as director for military comedy McHale's Navy, based on the television series of the same name; he was eventually replaced by Bryan Spicer. He returned to directing television in the 1990s, including episodes of shows like Caroline in the City, Everybody Loves Raymond, and Suddenly Susan. He also directed several television films, such as Genius and Alley Cats Strike, both for the Disney Channel. In 2002, his final directing credit, the television film Home Alone 4, premiered. After the film aired, Daniel retired from the business, noting to the Tribune that he anticipated to do much more work but found himself receiving very few offers. "And I know why: If you work in the arts for a living, you are paid to know what's in the air, what the mood is, the whole societal thing. And I don't care how hip you are, when it's over, it's over. I couldn't artistically reflect how the world changed."

== Personal life and death ==
Daniel married Martha "Marti" Mueller in 1965 and they remained married until Daniel's death. They had two children, Lucas and John. Lucas spoke warmly of his childhood, believing that Daniel's ability to channel his feelings and issues about his own father in Teen Wolf had helped him. Daniel and his family had lived in the Los Angeles neighborhood of Tarzana. After Daniel's retirement from the industry, he moved back to a rural home in Franklin, Tennessee for a few years, but found himself longing for city living. He then moved to downtown Chicago, where he lived the remainder of his life. He had a vacation home in Glen Arbor, Michigan which is on a small strip of land between Lake Michigan and Glen Lake. In the summer he enjoyed salmon fishing there.

Daniel was a voting member of the Academy of Motion Picture Arts and Sciences.

Daniel was an amateur musician, and played bass in a rock group called "The Wild Hots". The band consisted of a group of former Battleground Academy and Vanderbilt University students with whom he performed in the 1960s. They continued to rejoin for a reunion show about every five years, often without Daniel who was busy in California making films. When he moved back to Tennessee, he reunited with his band members and began performing around Nashville, mostly for charity functions.

Another of Daniel's hobbies was photography. He did fine art photographs, mostly black and white, which are largely scenes of rural America. To get his images, he often took time off to ride his Harley-Davidson motorcycle through the rural southwest U.S. for weeks, capturing scenes of forgotten towns and empty buildings. His work has been exhibited in juried shows and galleries in the U.S.

Daniel was diagnosed with Parkinson's disease in 2002. He underwent deep brain stimulation surgery in 2012. He was an advocate for research on the disorder and participated in a volunteer program to help other patients with the disease. Daniel died at his Chicago home from complications of Parkinson's disease on April 16, 2016. He was 73 years old.

== Filmography ==
Film

- Teen Wolf (1985)
- Like Father Like Son (1987)
- K-9 (1989)
- The Super (1991)
- Beethoven's 2nd (1993)

TV movies

- Genius (1999)
- Alley Cats Strike (2000)
- How to Marry a Billionaire: A Christmas Tale (2000)
- Home Alone 4 (2002)
