= Obsessed (1992 film) =

- Genre: Drama; Thriller
- Written by: David Peckinpah
- Directed by: Jonathan Sanger
- Starring: Shannen Doherty
- Theme music composer: Lee Holdridge
- Country of origin: United States
- Original language: English

Production
- Executive producer: Peter K. Duchow
- Producer: S. Bryan Hickox
- Production location: San Diego
- Cinematography: Stephen McNutt
- Editor: Paul Trejo
- Running time: 88 minutes
- Production companies: Peter K Duchow Enterprises Inc. World International Network

Original release
- Network: ABC
- Release: September 27, 1992

Obsessed is a 1992 television film directed by Jonathan Sanger and written by David Peckinpah.

== Plot ==
Lorie Brindel is a young marine surveyor who is attracted to older men, including one of her clients, Ed Bledsoe, a much older and twice-divorced man. After some flirting during her assessment of his yacht, they begin to date. While he is away on a business trip, Lorie moves in without asking. Although unhappy about it, he eventually relents and allows her to stay. As times passes, Lorie becomes more controlling of her romance with Ed, demanding that he be with her at all hours as well as have nobody else in his life. Lorie soon completely unravels from Ed's lack of commitment, and she cannot stand it when he chooses a golf tournament with some friends over her romantic weekend. Ed, never sure about their relationship in the first place, decides he's had enough and orders her to move out that day.

Lorie cannot accept it's over and believes it's just a lovers' spat that will ultimately result in marriage. She calls at night, begging for another chance, but is refused. Though he denies any intention to see her, Ed checks up on Lorie and punches out a man who was harassing her. Feeling trapped, Ed entertains and eventually sleeps with Lorie again. He resolves to break it off the next day, but she calls throughout the night, phoning everyone she knows when he doesn't answer. Andie, Ed's daughter, convinces him to be harsh, and he informs Lorie that she needs to leave him alone or he'll change his number.

Feeling betrayed, Lorie makes two attempts to see Ed, first embarrassing him in front of his friends and a new woman, Louise, then showing up drunk and barely dressed for his birthday night where she runs away upon seeing Andie. Rejected, Lorie tries to commit suicide. Ed feels guilty and visits the hospital to make sure she's stable, then leaves again without seeing her. In the doctor's office, Lorie describes to a psychiatrist what she thinks would have been the perfect romance, but is ultimately released. Lorie becomes increasingly unstable, following Ed and threatening to destroy his possessions. She blows up his boat, and Ed finally reports her. However, the police are unable to help without proof.

Lorie is fired from her job due to her behavior, which she blames on Ed. At his house, she takes his handgun and waits. She then holds Andie hostage where Lorie tells her about her unhappy childhood and about how her own father neglected and abandoned her. As a result, Lorie then developed an unnatural attraction to older men whom she tries to mold each one in the image of her absent father. When Ed arrives, Lorie threatens to kill Andie despite pleas from Ed to lower the gun. Ed attacks and almost chokes Lorie to death before being pulled off by his daughter. Lorie is taken to another doctor's office but is hostile and refuses to cooperate. When she is led away to be committed to a mental hospital, she violently pulls her arm out of the guard's grasp.

In the final scene, set one year later, Ed has purchased a new yacht. He is now dating Louise and sees her as the best thing that ever happened to him. As he is looking at the scenery, he notices another yacht passing by with a woman on it. He makes eye contact only to discover it is Lorie in the company of another wealthy, older man.

== Cast ==
- Shannen Doherty as Lorie Brindel
- William Devane as Ed Bledsoe
- Clare Carey as Andie Bledsoe
- James Handy as Jerry
- Lois Chiles as Louise

== Reception ==
Tony Scott of Variety called a predictable film with "relentlessly tiring (and tiresome) excesses". Tom Ensign of the Toledo Blade wrote, "What makes this film work is the reality of the situation." Faye Zuckerman of The Daily Dispatch called it a "second-rate Fatal Attraction" with a "somewhat effective" performance from Doherty.
