= James Handy =

American actor (1945–2026)

- Born: March 19, 1945; New York City, U.S.
- Died: June 3, 2026 (aged 81); Tarzana, Los Angeles, California, U.S.
- Occupation: Actor
- Years active: 1977–2024

James Handy (March 19, 1945 – June 3, 2026) was an American actor. He appeared in numerous films and television shows since 1977. On film, he appeared as Byers in K-9 (1989) and its sequel, K-911 (1999). He later had roles in Arachnophobia (1990), Jumanji (1995), Unbreakable (2000), Logan (2017), and as Jimmy in Top Gun: Maverick (2022). His most notable television appearances are as Arthur Devlin in Alias and Lou Handleman in Profiler.

== Acting career ==
Handy was known for his multiple guest star roles in television shows and his work in highly popular films. Among his feature film credits are 15 Minutes, Jumanji, Guarding Tess, The Rocketeer, Arachnophobia, Bird, Burglar, Brighton Beach Memoirs, The Verdict and K-9. Made-for-television movies in which he appeared include A Family Torn Apart, Obsessed, Guilty Until Proven Innocent, and The Preppie Murder.

On television, in episodic and comedy series, he appeared on The Young and the Restless, Criminal Minds, nine episodes of Alias, Cold Case, The West Wing, UC: Undercover, Third Watch, ER, Law & Order, Murder, She Wrote, The Pretender, Quantum Leap, and Castle. He portrayed Captain Haverhill in 10 episodes of NYPD Blue. In 2017, he appeared in Logan.

== Death ==
Handy died on June 3, 2026, in Los Angeles at the age of 81, after suffering a stab wound to the chest. Michael Gledhill then called 911 and stated he was the culprit. He was later arrested.

== Filmography ==
=== Film ===
James Handy film credits
Year	Title	Role	Notes
1981	Taps	Sheriff	
1982	The Verdict	Kevin Doneghy	
1986	Hotshot		
1986	Brighton Beach Memoirs	Frank Murphy	
1987	Burglar	Carson 'Johnny' Verrill	
1987	Jake's M.O.	Danny McGurk	
1988	Bird	Esteves	
1989	K-9	Lieutenant Byers	
1990	Arachnophobia	Milton Briggs	
1991	The Rocketeer	FBI Agent "Wooly" Wolinski	
1993	Point of No Return	Operative	
1994	Guarding Tess	Neal Carlo	
1994	Rave Review	James	
1995	Jumanji	Exterminator	
1997	Murder in Mind	Dr. Harvard	
1997	Gang Related	Captain Henderson	
1999	Deterrence	Lancaster / President Buchanan	
1999	Every Dog Has Its Day	The Sign Painter	
1999	K-911	Captain Byers	Direct-to-video
2000	Unbreakable	Priest	
2001	15 Minutes	Deputy Chief Fire Marshal Declan Duffy	
2001	The Donor	John / Françoise's father	
2002	The Trip	Hal	
2002	Ash Wednesday	Father Mahoney	
2008	Rounds	Nathan	
2010	The Waiter	The CEO	
2010	Lifted	Travis	
2017	Logan	Old Doctor	
2017	Thru: The Hereafter Remains Unknown	Frank	
2017	Suburbicon	Mayor Billings	
2021	Senior Entourage	Father MacGuffin	
2022	Top Gun: Maverick	Jimmy	

=== Television ===
James Handy television credits
Year	Title	Role	Notes
1977	Ryan's Hope	Red	
1985	Kojak: The Belarus File	Federal Agent #1	
1985	Search for Tomorrow	Sgt. Leland Curry	
1985	CBS Schoolbreak Special	Dan Banks	
1985	ABC Afterschool Specials	Lieutenant Bingham	
1985	Spenser: For Hire	Joe Glenn	
1985–86	Our Family Honor	Lt. Phillip 'Buck' Rogers	
1986	Cagney & Lacey	Gutierrez	
1986	Samaritan: The Mitch Snyder Story	Melvin Mander	TV movie
1986	Popeye Doyle	Lt. Gregory Paulus	TV movie
1986	Matlock	Prosecutor	
1986–87	Stingray	Chief Nelson Riskin	3 episodes
1987	The Room Upstairs	Frank	TV movie
1987	Wiseguy	Chief Yates	
1988	Quiet Victory: The Charlie Wedemeyer Story	Charlie's Doctor	TV movie
1988	A Dangerous Life	Mike Heseltine	2 episodes
1988–94	L.A. Law	Pierce's Atty. Sumner / John Vincent	
1989	Hard Time on Planet Earth	Mr. Parker	
1989	The Preppie Murder	Detective Joe Brady Quinn	TV movie
1989	Mancuso, F.B.I.	Gulliver	
1989	Midnight Caller	Tommy Cobb	Episode: "Blood Red"
1990	Unspeakable Acts	Jeff Samek	TV movie
1990–91	Equal Justice	Defense Attorney / Djakonski	
1991	Reasonable Doubts	Lt. John Dugan	
1991	False Arrest	Thomas Thinnes	TV movie
1992	The Young Riders	Isiah Burke	
1992	Quantum Leap	Ross Tyler	Episode: "Temptation Eyes"
1992	The Commish	Donald Barrett	
1992	The Fifth Corner	Max Alden	
1992	Angel Street	Captain Mulligan	
1992	Obsessed	Jerry	TV movie
1992	Wings	Dr. Lenny	
1992	Civil Wars	Arthur Brandt	
1992	Murder, She Wrote	Lieutenant Pat Hogan	Episode: "Sugar & Spice, Malice & Vice"
1992–95	Melrose Place	Matt Fielding, Sr.	6 episodes
1993	The Young Indiana Jones Chronicles	Frank Brady	
1993	Raven	Nick Henderson	
1993	A Family Torn Apart	Det. Stockman	TV movie
1993–95	NYPD Blue	Captain Jim Haverhill	7 episodes
1994	Silk Stalkings	Ben Kreinholz	
1994	The George Carlin Show	Father Garrity	
1994	Without Warning	Dr. Norbert Hazelton	TV movie
1994	Picket Fences	David Pastor	
1995	The O. J. Simpson Story	Det. Vannatter	
1995	Under One Roof	Seaton	
1995	Beverly Hills, 90210	Tom Rose	
1995	The X-Files	Alan Cross	Episode: "2Shy"
1995	Walker, Texas Ranger	Elliot Cheever	
1996	Gone in the Night	Andy Litton	TV movie
1996	The Pretender	Steve Hanlon	
1997	Promised Land	Tony Markovich	
1997	EZ Streets	McClay	
1997	Law & Order	Mr. Wheeler	Episode: "Thrill"
1997	Early Edition	Uncle Bob Sheaghan	
1997	Dellaventura	Lieutenant Tom Bevnic	
1997–98	Profiler	Lou Handleman	7 episodes
1997–2002	The Practice	Philly Sidlow / Lt. Paul Stewart	
1998	Prey	Lt. Quinn	
1998	To Have & to Hold	Doug Anderson	
1999	ER	Dan Sullivan	
1999	Black and White	Sergeant Wright	TV movie
1999	L.A. Doctors	Ronny Wilcox	
1999	Time Served	Judge Will T. Engstrom III	TV movie
2000	Mary and Rhoda	Paul - The Doorman	TV movie
2000	Third Watch	Father Goodwin	
2000	Gideon's Crossing	David Kennedy	
2000, 2001	The West Wing	Representative Joe Bruno	2 episodes
2001	UC: Undercover	Priest	
2002	Becker	Officer O'Neil	
2002	Breaking News	Jack Barnes	
2002	Without a Trace	Dr. Falk	
2002	MDs	Hamilton	
2002–06	Alias	Arthur Devlin	8 episodes
2003	The Dead Zone	Joe Bannerman	
2003	Crossing Jordan	Mr. Bergstrom	
2005	E-Ring	Congressman Hal Lovett	
2005	Cold Case	Roger Raitt - 2005	
2006	Commander in Chief	Bernard Hendrix	
2006	The Closer	Mr. Rawley	
2007	Smith	Sy	
2008	Raising the Bar	Judge Albert Meade	
2009	Criminal Minds	Tom Shaunessy	Episode: "Omnivore"
2009–11	The Young and the Restless	Governor	
2010	Castle	Clifford Stuckey	Episode: "Under the Gun"
2012	Touch	Lanford Biddle	
2012	Vegas	Mr. Dobbs	
2012	CSI: NY	Charles Ross	
2013	Rizzoli & Isles	Leroy Grovner	Episode: "Somebody's Watching Me"
2014	Mulaney	Father Ed	Episode: "In the Name of the Mother, and the Son and the Holy Andre"
2015	Bad Sister	Bishop O'Reilly	TV movie
2016	Documentary Now!		Episode: "Mr. Runner Up: My Life as an Oscar Bridesmaid, Part 2"
2018	NCIS: Los Angeles	Former NIS Operative George Nelson	Episode: "Các Tù Nhân" (S9.E13)
2021	9-1-1	Felix	
