= White Room (film) =

1990 Canadian film by Patricia Rozema

- Directed by: Patricia Rozema
- Written by: Patricia Rozema
- Produced by: Alexandra Raffe; Patricia Rozema
- Starring: Maurice Godin; Kate Nelligan; Sheila McCarthy
- Cinematography: Paul Sarossy
- Edited by: Patricia Rozema
- Music by: Mark Korven; Patricia Rozema
- Release date: 2 October 1990
- Running time: 93 minutes
- Country: Canada
- Language: English

For the unreleased film by The KLF, see The KLF films.

White Room is a 1990 Canadian drama film written and directed by Patricia Rozema and starring Maurice Godin, Kate Nelligan and Sheila McCarthy. Ziggy Lorenc and Erika Ritter also have cameo appearances in the film as interviewers.

== Premise ==
Norm is a confused young man who is drawn into events after witnessing the murder of rock star Madeleine X (Margot Kidder). Jane, a mysterious woman, meets Norm at Madeleine X's funeral, and Zelda, a quirky bohemian artist, helps Norm get a job and attempt to solve the murder.

== Cast ==
- Kate Nelligan as Jane
- Maurice Godin as Norm
- Margot Kidder as Madelaine X
- Sheila McCarthy as Zelda
- Barbara Gordon as Mrs. Gentle
- Nicky Guadagni as The Narrator
- Erika Ritter as Radio Interviewer
- Les Rubie as Man with Cow
- Dwayne McLean as Attacker
- David Ferry as Record Executive

== Home media ==
The movie was released in Canada on VHS by Alliance Releasing Home Video. In 2002, the film was released on DVD by Alliance Atlantis. The DVD contains a widescreen presentation, French and English audio tracks, and an audio commentary by the director.

As of 2019 the film has been released online on Canada Media Fund's Encore+ YouTube channel.

In 2023, Telefilm Canada announced that the film was one of 23 titles that will be digitally restored under its new Canadian Cinema Reignited program to preserve classic Canadian films.
