= Yvette Freeman =

American actress, singer and director

- Born: Wilmington, Delaware, U.S.
- Occupation: Actress
- Years active: 1979–present

Yvette Freeman is an American actress, singer and director. Predominantly active as a stage actress, she made her Broadway debut in 1979 in the original production of Ain't Misbehavin'. She won the Obie Award for Distinguished Performance by an Actress for her portrayal of Dinah Washington in the 1998 Off-Broadway play Dinah Was. On television, she is best known for her roles as Haleh Adams in the NBC medical drama series ER, Evelyn Smalley in the TV series Working, and Irma Lerman in Orange Is the New Black.

== Life and career ==
Freeman was born and raised in Wilmington, Delaware. She later moved to New York City to pursue a career in graphic design. There she turned to acting on stage productions, before appearing in The Wiz and Ain't Misbehavin'. At the same time, she also worked as a singer in nightclubs and performed in cabaret. In 1990, Freeman relocated to Los Angeles, and began appearing on television in shows like Tales from the Crypt, Knots Landing, and L.A. Law.

Freeman is best known for her role as Haleh Adams, a registered nurse, on the NBC medical drama series ER. She played the role from 1994 to the series finale in 2009, appearing in 184 episodes total. She was one of the longest-serving recurring characters on the show, having appeared in every season since 1994, with her first appearance in the two-hour pilot episode. From 1997 to 1999, she was also a regular on the NBC sitcom Working, while still appearing in ER. In 2002, during the ER summer hiatus, she lost 120 pounds and now speaks as a positive advocate for weight loss.

In 1999, Freeman released her debut album, A Tribute to Dinah Washington, after performing in the Off-Broadway production of Dinah Was. She won the Obie Award for Distinguished Performance by an Actress in 1998. In 2012, she played Ma Rainey, the "Mother of the Blues", in the Huntington Theatre Company production of August Wilson's Ma Rainey's Black Bottom.

In 2000s, Freeman had recurring roles on the daytime soap operas Days of Our Lives and The Bold and the Beautiful, and guest-starred on Judging Amy, Boston Public, and CSI: Crime Scene Investigation. In 2014, Freeman was cast as Irma, one of "The Golden Girls", in the Netflix comedy-drama series Orange Is the New Black. Along with the cast, Freeman received a Screen Actors Guild Award for Outstanding Performance by an Ensemble in a Comedy Series.

== Filmography ==
=== Film/Movie ===
Year	Title	Role	Notes
1991	Switch	Mae the Maid	
1991	Dead Again	Nurse	
1992	Just My Imagination	Mrs. DeWitt	TV movie
1995	Children of the Corn III: Urban Harvest	Samantha	
1995	Angus	Science Teacher	
1996	Norma Jean & Marilyn	Hazel Washington	TV movie
2002	The Adventures of Tom Thumb and Thumbelina	Leola (voice)	Video
2002	Hung-Up	Aida	Short
2003	Remember	-	Short
2005	Planting Melvin	Wanda Shepard	
2009	The Revenant	Scientological Nurse	
2010	Five Star Day	Social Worker	
2011	Hope	Librarian	Short
2017	The Last Word	Housekeeper	
2020	Blindfire	Gayle Hughes	
2021	The Starling	Mrs. Oberhoffer	

=== Television ===
Year	Title	Role	Notes
1990	Alien Nation	Helen	Episode: "The Touch"
1990	Ann Jillian	Gloria	Episode: "It's a Mall World After All"
1990	Dragnet	Witness	Episode: "The Torch"
1990	Doctor Doctor	Mrs. Cratchit	Episode: "Malpractice Makes Imperfect"
1990	Over My Dead Body	Nurse Hunter	Episode: "Carrie Christmas and a Nappie New Year"
1991	Equal Justice	Clerk	Episode: "Courting Disaster"
1991	Tales from the Crypt	Jury Forewoman	Episode: "The Trap"
1991	Step by Step	Doris	Episode: "Yo-Yo's Wedding"
1992	Knots Landing	Gwen	Episode: "The Price"
1992-93	Down the Shore	The Woman/Sheriff	Episode: "My Left Feet" & "Jail Bait"
1993	Camp Wilder	Teacher	Episode: "Career Day"
1993	Life Goes On	Nurse #1	Episode: "Bedfellows"
1993	Sisters	Nightmare Host #3	Episode: "Sleepless in Winnetka"
1994	Hangin' with Mr. Cooper	Feather	Episode: "Pros and Convicts"
1994	L.A. Law	Anelda Hightower	Episode: "Finish Line"
1994-2009	ER	Nurse Haleh Adams	Recurring cast
1995	The John Larroquette Show	Mrs. Wilson	Episode: "Night Moves"
1996	Living Single	Ms. Peabody	Episode: "The Engagement: Part 2"
1997	NYPD Blue	Sister Sun Ray	Episode: "Tom and Geri"
1997-99	Working	Evelyn Smalley	Main cast
2000	Judging Amy	Claire Reeves	Episode: "The Burden of Perspective"
2000-01	Boston Public	Gladys Crenshaw	Episodes: "Chapter Eight" and "Chapter Eleven"
2001	That's Life	Lawyer	Episode: "No Good Deed"
2001	The Tick	Thelma	Episode: "The License"
2002	Presidio Med	-	Episode: "Good Question"
2007	Saving Grace	Toby McKees	Episode: "This Is Way Too Normal for You"
2008-10	Days of Our Lives	Nurse Lesley	Regular Cast
2010	Pretty Little Liars	School Administrator	Episode: "The Perfect Storm"
2009-12	The Bold and the Beautiful	Dr. Lewis	Regular Cast
2014	CSI: Crime Scene Investigation	Cynthia Hughes	Episode: "The Twin Paradox"
2014-15	Orange Is the New Black	Irma Lerman	Recurring cast: Season 2, guest: Season 3
2019	A Black Lady Sketch Show	Denise Garrett	Episode: "Why Are Her Pies Wet, Lord?"
2020	Deputy	Mrs. Murphy	Episode: "Deputy Down"
2020	Amazing Stories	Sterling's Grandma	Episode: "The Heat"
2023	Will Trent	Bonnie	Episode: "Manhunt"
