= Chestnut: Hero of Central Park =

- DVD cover
- Directed by: Robert Vince
- Written by: Anna McRoberts; Anne Vince
- Produced by: Robert Vince; Anna McRoberts; Wolfgang Esenwein
- Starring: Barry Bostwick; Justin Louis; Christine Tucci; Maurice Godin; Irene Olga Lopez; Ethan Phillips; Fred Ewanuick; Abigail Breslin; Makenzie Vega
- Cinematography: Arthur E. Cooper
- Edited by: Jason Pielak
- Music by: Brahm Wenger
- Production companies: Studio Hamburg Worldwide Pictures; Keystone Entertainment
- Distributed by: Miramax Films
- Release date: October 21, 2004
- Running time: 83 minutes
- Country: United States
- Language: English
- Budget: $6.7 million
- Box office: $10 million

Chestnut: Hero of Central Park is a 2004 comedy film directed and co-produced by Robert Vince, and starring Makenzie Vega, Abigail Breslin, Justin Louis, Christine Tucci, and Barry Bostwick. A co-production of the United States and Canada, the film's plot follows a Great Dane who is taken in by two recently adopted orphan sisters, who keep the dog a secret from their new adoptive parents.

== Synopsis ==
Soon after being taken in by a loving new mother and father (Mr. Matt Tomley and Mrs. Laura Tomley), two young former orphans (Sal and Ray) do their best to keep their furry, four-legged friend — a lovable Great Dane named Chestnut — a secret from their adoptive parents and save him from a grim fate at the city pound, where he would certainly be euthanized.

== Cast ==
- Makenzie Vega as Sal
- Abigail Breslin as Ray
- Barry Bostwick as Thomas Trundle
- Justin Louis as Matt Tomley
- Christine Tucci as Laura Tomley
- Maurice Godin as Wesley
- Irene Olga Lopez as Rosa Maria
- Ethan Phillips as Marty
- Fred Ewanuick as Kosh
- Jessica Amlee as Mary
- Margot Berner as Annie
- Tony Alcantar as Chef
- Irene Karas as Marta

== Release ==
=== Home media ===
Chestnut: Hero of Central Park was released on DVD on December 19, 2006 by The Weinstein Company.
