= Working (TV series) =

1997 American sitcom

- Genre: Sitcom
- Created by: Michael Davidoff; Bill Rosenthal
- Starring: Fred Savage; Maurice Godin; Yvette Freeman; Sarah Knowlton; Arden Myrin; Todd Waring; Dana Gould; Steve Hytner; Rebecca McFarland; Debi Mazar; Kate Hodge
- Opening theme: "Working in the Coal Mine" performed by Devo
- Composers: Craig Jerris; Mark Mothersbaugh
- Country of origin: United States
- Original language: English
- No. of seasons: 2
- No. of episodes: 39 (4 unaired)

Production
- Executive producers: Michael Davidoff; Bill Rosenthal
- Producers: Sy Rosen; Noah Taft; Andrew Tsao; Fred Savage; Werner Walian; Mark Wilding
- Camera setup: Multi-camera
- Running time: 30 minutes
- Production companies: Davidoff/Rosenthal Productions; NBC Studios

Original release
- Network: NBC
- Release: October 8, 1997 – January 25, 1999

Working is an American sitcom television series that aired on NBC for two seasons from October 8, 1997 to January 25, 1999. The series was created and executive produced by Michael Davidoff and Bill Rosenthal. The series stars Fred Savage and an ensemble cast including Maurice Godin, Arden Myrin, Yvette Freeman, and Steve Hytner.

== Synopsis ==
Working took a satirical (and sometimes over-the-top) look at office life within a big corporate company. The show starred Fred Savage as the naive Matt Peyser who had just graduated from college and was ready to climb the corporate ladder. His ideals are constantly challenged by his boss, Tim Deale, played by Maurice Godin. Other characters included dim-witted Jimmy (Dana Gould), under-appreciated secretary Hal (Sarah Knowlton), overly perky Abby Cosgrove (Arden Myrin), acerbic Delaney (Steve Hytner), and no-nonsense manager Evelyn (Yvette Freeman), that Matt makes friends and work with.

Due to faltering ratings, the network attempted to breathe new life into the show during the second season with some cast changes. This included writing out the characters of Jimmy and Hal. They were replaced by Debi Mazar as the ruthless Liz and Rebecca McFarland as Val (As an in-joke, when Matt first sees Liz and Val he mistakenly calls them Jimmy and Hal). During the series run, Danica McKellar, formerly Savage's costar in The Wonder Years, made two guest-appearances playing a woman Savage's character meets in a bar, and of whom he says "she reminds me of a girl I grew up with!"

Ratings for the series didn't improve, however, and NBC canceled Working in January 1999. 35 of the 39 episodes produced were aired.

== Theme song ==
The show used a sound-alike version of Devo's cover of the song "Working in the Coal Mine", set over top of scenes of work, including marching workers from the film Metropolis, frantic work scenes from Terry Gilliam's Brazil and office scenes from Billy Wilder's The Apartment. The vocals of the theme song were removed for the USA Network broadcasts.

== Cast and characters ==
- Fred Savage as Matt Peyser
- Maurice Godin as Tim Deale
- Yvette Freeman as Evelyn Smalley
- Sarah Knowlton as Hal Blum (season 1) (Note: Listed after Dana Gould and Steve Hytner in the opening credits from episode 2 on.)
- Arden Myrin as Abby Cosgrove
- Todd Waring (pilot only) and Steve Hytner as John Delaney
- Joey Slotnick (pilot only) and Dana Gould as Jimmy Clarke (season 1)
- Kate Hodge as Chris Grant (10 episodes, season 1)
- Rebecca McFarland as Val Gibson (season 2)
- Debi Mazar as Liz Tricoli (season 2)

== Episodes ==
=== Series overview ===
Season	Episodes	Originally released	
Season	Episodes	First released	Last released
1	22	October 8, 1997	May 18, 1998
2	17	September 22, 1998	January 25, 1999

=== Season 1 (1997–98) ===
No. overall	No. in season	Title	Directed by	Written by	Original release date	Prod. code	U.S. viewers (millions)
1	1	"Pilot"	Andrew Tsao	Michael Davidoff & Bill Rosenthal	October 8, 1997	5935	14.57
2	2	"Close Quarters"	James Widdoes	Sy Rosen	October 15, 1997	62303	9.39
3	3	"Rumoring"	James Widdoes	Will Gluck	October 29, 1997	62304	11.75
4	4	"Quick Out of the Gate"	Fred Savage	Ben Wexler	November 5, 1997	62302	11.42
5	5	"Sexual Harassment"	James Widdoes	Phill Lewis	November 12, 1997	62308	13.07
6	6	"Lost Weekend"	James Widdoes	Mike Langworthy	November 19, 1997	62306	11.38
7	7	"Creative Matt"	James Widdoes	Steve Tompkins	December 3, 1997	62309	10.86
8	8	"Top o' the World, Ma"	Andrew Tsao	Vicki S. Horwitz & Sy Rosen	December 10, 1997	62310	10.61
9	9	"Medieval Christmas"	Andrew Tsao	Rob Cornick & Cory Jachnuk	December 17, 1997	62311	11.73
10	10	"The Breakfast"	Andrew Tsao	Michael Davidoff & Bill Rosenthal	January 7, 1998	62312	13.13
11	11	"Enemies: A Love Story"	Andrew Tsao	Will Gluck	January 14, 1998	62313	11.80
12	12	"Sam I Am"	James Widdoes	Marsha Myers	January 21, 1998	62307	12.93
13	13	"Boys Club"	Andrew Tsao	Michael Davidoff & Bill Rosenthal	January 28, 1998	62315	13.48
14	14	"Hatchet Man"	James Widdoes	Vicki S. Horwitz	February 4, 1998	62305	12.76
15	15	"Mum's the Word"	David Owen Trainor	Michael Davidoff & Bill Rosenthal	February 25, 1998	62317	9.31
16	16	"As Bad As It Gets"	Andrew Tsao	Matt Goldman & Will Gluck	March 18, 1998	62318	13.79
17	17	"Labor Pains"	Andrew Tsao	Noah Taft	March 25, 1998	62319	11.40
18	18	"The Gold Digger"	Andrew Tsao	Ben Wexler	April 1, 1998	62316	10.05
19	19	"Equality"	Robert Berlinger	Marsha Myers	April 15, 1998	62314	10.15
20	20	"The Lying Game"	Linda Day	Rob Cornick & Cory Jachnuk	April 29, 1998	62321	11.03
21	21	"Due Process"	Steve Zuckerman	Will Gluck & Matt Goldman	May 6, 1998	62322	8.13
22	22	"The Brown Noser"	Andrew Tsao	Mark Wilding & Marsha Myers	May 13, 1998	62320	10.68

=== Season 2 (1998–99) ===
No. overall	No. in season	Title	Directed by	Written by	Original release date	Prod. code	U.S. viewers (millions)
23	1	"Home-o-Apathy"	Andrew Tsao	Will Gluck	September 22, 1998	62752	12.40
24	2	"The Closer"	Andrew Tsao	Rob Cornick & Cory Jachnuk	September 29, 1998	62751	12.35
25	3	"Armageddon Outta Here"	Andrew Tsao	David Fury	October 27, 1998	62757	10.88
26	4	"Performance Review"	Andrew Tsao	Steve Baldikoski & Bryan Behar	November 3, 1998	62753	8.70
27	5	"Good Val Hunting"	Andrew Tsao	Noah Taft	November 10, 1998	62756	11.53
28	6	"Networking"	Andrew Tsao	Beth Fieger Falkenstein	November 17, 1998	62758	10.37
29	7	"A Boy, a Girl, and His Bird"	Andrew Tsao	Sy Rosen & Vicki S. Horwitz	December 1, 1998	62755	9.41
30	8	"The Consultant"	Andrew Tsao	Mark Wilding	December 8, 1998	62754	9.05
31	9	"Greenery"	Andrew Tsao	Will Gluck	December 18, 1998	62760	N/A
32	10	"The Christmas Party"	Andrew Tsao	Mark Wilding	December 22, 1998	62762	9.25
33	11	"Romeo and Julie"	Andrew Tsao	Noah Taft	January 11, 1999	62759	5.62
34	12	"The Retreat"	Andrew Tsao	Michael Davidoff & Bill Rosenthal	January 18, 1999	62763	6.64
35	13	"The Prodigy"	David Owen Trainor	Bryan Behar & Steve Baldikoski	January 25, 1999	62764	6.73
36	14	"Manifesto Destiny"	Andrew Tsao	Ben Wexler	Unaired	62761	N/A
37	15	"The Other Executive"	Fred Savage	Marty Weiss	Unaired	62765	N/A
38	16	"She Loves Me, Yeah, Yeah, Yeah"	Linda Day	David Rosenberg	Unaired	62766	N/A
39	17	"Sliding Doors"	Andrew Tsao	Sy Rosen & Mark Wilding	Unaired	62767	N/A

== Awards ==
Year	Award	Category	Recipient	Result	Ref.
2000	Young Artist Awards	Best Performance in a TV Comedy Series – Young Performer Age Ten or Under	Sara Paxton	Won	
