= The Renegades (TV series) =

1983 American crime drama

- Ad for the 1982 TV movie
- Genre: Crime drama
- Created by: Lawrence Gordon; Rick Husky
- Starring: Patrick Swayze; Kurtwood Smith; James Luisi
- Composers: Barry DeVorzon; Joseph Conlan
- Country of origin: United States
- Original language: English
- No. of seasons: 1
- No. of episodes: 6 (+ pilot)

Production
- Executive producers: Lawrence Gordon; Charles Gordon
- Editor: John F. Link (pilot)
- Running time: 60 minutes
- Production companies: Lawrence Gordon Productions; Paramount Television

Original release
- Network: ABC
- Release: March 4 – April 8, 1983

The Renegades is an American action crime drama television series about a street gang that becomes a special police undercover unit in order to avoid jail time. The show starred Patrick Swayze as "Bandit", the leader of the gang.

== Cast ==
- Patrick Swayze as "Bandit"
- Randy Brooks as "Eagle"
- Paul Mones as J.T.
- Tracy Scoggins as Tracy (TV movie pilot)
- Robert Thaler as "Dancer"
- Brian Tochi as "Dragon"
- Angel Granados Jr. (2-hour pilot) and Fausto Bara (post-pilot) as Gaucho
- James Luisi as Lieutenant Marciano
- Kurtwood Smith as Captain Scanlon

== Episodes ==
The two-hour television movie backdoor pilot for this series aired on August 11, 1982.

List of The Renegades episodes
No.	Title	Directed by	Written by	Original release date
1	"Back to School"	Nicholas Corea	Bobby Zavatini	March 4, 1983
College athletes are suspected of point-shaving.
2	"The Demon Dragsters"	Don Chaffey	Nancy Ann Miller	March 11, 1983
Car strippers use souped-up cars to evade the police.
3	"The Big Time"	Barbara Peeters	Stephen McPherson	March 18, 1983
Prisoners are being trained to crack sophisticated safes.
4	"On the Pad"	Bruce Bilson	Robert Earll	March 25, 1983
The team goes undercover to find out why a cop lets two extortionists go.
5	"Film at Eleven"	Unknown	Gregory S. Dinallo	April 1, 1983
An 11-year-old is a witness to a holdup-murder.
6	"Target: Marciano"	Barbara Peeters	Nicholas Corea	April 8, 1983
An escaped drug pusher wants Marciano to surrender to him or else there will be a blood bath in the streets.

== Broadcast history ==
After the success of the movie The Warriors, Hollywood looked to take the youth gang concept and market it to TV. In 1981, Patrick Swayze starred in a TV movie, Return of the Rebels, about an aging motorcycle gang who get together to help a friend who owns a popular campground that is being threatened by a band of arrogant groupies.

Brother team Lawrence and Charles Gordon tried to market Swayze's rebel look, combine the gang concept with a police angle, and came up with The Renegades. Roger Spottiswoode directed the TV movie pilot that premiered on August 11, 1982, and a six-episode series was broadcast in Spring 1983. It had weak ratings and ABC cancelled the show.

== Ratings ==
Season	Episodes	Start date	End date	Nielsen rank	Nielsen rating
1982–83	6	March 4, 1983	April 8, 1983	98	N/A
