= The Super (1991 film) =

1991 American comedy film directed by Rod Daniel

- Theatrical release poster
- Directed by: Rod Daniel
- Written by: Sam Simon; Nora Ephron
- Produced by: Richard E. Frazier; Charles Gordon
- Starring: Joe Pesci; Vincent Gardenia; Madolyn Smith Osborne; Ruben Blades
- Cinematography: Bruce Surtees
- Edited by: Jack Hofstra
- Music by: Miles Goodman
- Production company: Largo Entertainment
- Distributed by: 20th Century Fox
- Release date: October 4, 1991
- Running time: 86 minutes
- Country: United States
- Language: English
- Budget: $22 million
- Box office: $11 million

The Super is a 1991 American comedy film directed by Rod Daniel and starring Joe Pesci as a New York City slum landlord sentenced to live in one of his own buildings until it is brought up to code. Screenwriter Nora Ephron co-scripted the story with Sam Simon. The Super is the last film in which Vincent Gardenia appeared.

The Super was released by 20th Century Fox on October 4, 1991. The film was panned by critics and was a box office bomb, grossing $11 million against a $22 million budget.

== Plot ==
Louie Kritski is a heartless slumlord who was born into money, thanks to his ruthless father, "Big Lou", also a slumlord. However, the tables turn on Louie when he's threatened with a year in prison for his failure to keep his New York City slum up to code. The judge gives him another option, which he accepts: he must live in a vacant apartment of one of his own shoddy run-down apartment blocks until he brings it up to livable standards.

The sentence is an effective house arrest; Louie is not allowed to leave the apartment except for routine exercise, grocery shopping, medical reasons, or business relating to building repairs. In addition, Louie is not authorized to make any changes to the apartment he has been assigned unless all other apartments had the same upgrade beforehand. Louie is also warned that if the building isn't fully repaired within the duration of his house arrest, he will be sent to prison. At first Louie is adamant that not one repair will be carried out and will wait until his father pulls strings. However, Louie has a change of heart after meeting and getting to know the building's residents, including a small-time hustler named Marlon, and a struggling street boy named Tito.

Over time, Louie grows more sympathetic with their problems and makes amends for his greediness through actions such as donating space heaters to the tenants to help them cope with the winter. Unfortunately, Big Lou is the owner of the property in title, and he resists his son's entreaties to spend money to improve the tenements. Louie bonds with Marlon on the basketball court. When Louie confronts Big Lou, who is about to set fire to his own tenement, all the residents appear on the roof to back up Louie. The film ends with Louie's building completely refurbished, Marlon becoming the new super, and all the tenants gathered outside to see Louie off with a gift: his Corvette—which had been completely stripped of its parts shortly after he first arrived—fully restored. A grateful Louie drives away as a large man appears and angrily demands to know who stole his car; all the tenants point in the direction in which Louie drove off in.

== Cast ==
- Joe Pesci as Louie Kritski Jr.
  - Daniel Baltzman as Young Louie Kritski Jr.
- Vincent Gardenia as Lou "Big Lou" Kritski Sr.
- Ruben Blades as Marlon
- Madolyn Smith as Naomi Bensinger
- Stacey Travis as Heather
- Carole Shelley as Irene Kritski
- Kenny Blank as Tito
- Steven Rodriguez as Pedro
- Beatrice Winde as Leotha
- Paul Benjamin as Gilliam
- Anthony Heald as Ron Nessim
- Eileen Galindo as Linda Diaz
- Pete Cody as Pete "Fantastic Pete", In 2A

According to Rod Daniel, Chevy Chase was originally considered for the lead role.

== Production ==
The Super had a $22 million production budget.

Exteriors were filmed on location, at 533 East 11th Street, in the East Village, Manhattan, built in 1920 with 6 stories and 14 units.

== Reception ==
The Super was a box-office failure, only grossing $11,000,863 domestically in its release. It was also widely panned by critics in its theatrical release. On Rotten Tomatoes it has an approval rating of 0% based on 9 reviews. Audiences surveyed by CinemaScore gave the film a grade of "B−" on scale of A+ to F.

Roger Ebert gave the film 2 out of 4.

Kenny Blank, who played Tito, was nominated for a Young Artist Award in 1992 in the category 'Best Young Actor Co-starring in a Motion Picture'.
