= Largo Entertainment =

Defunct US film production company

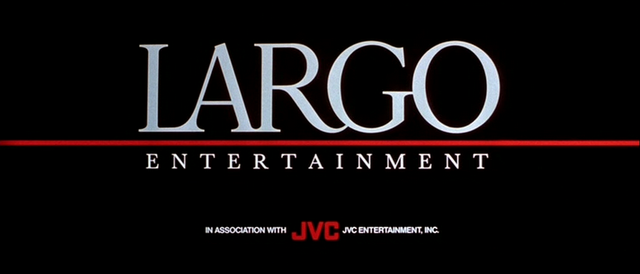
- Company type: Film studio
- Industry: Motion pictures
- Founded: 1989; 37 years ago
- Founder: Lawrence Gordon
- Defunct: 1999; 27 years ago
- Fate: Assets sold to Intermedia
- Successor: Intermedia
- Headquarters: United States
- Owner: Each of 50% owned by: Lawrence Gordon; JVC

Largo Entertainment was an American independent production company founded in 1989. It was run by film producer Lawrence Gordon and was backed by electronics firm Victor Company of Japan, Ltd. (JVC) in an investment that cost more than $100 million. The production company released their first film, Point Break in 1991 and their last film was Grey Owl in 1999.

== History ==
In August 1989, Gordon formed Largo Entertainment with the backing of JVC, representing the first major Japanese investment in the entertainment industry. Although JVC put up the entire $100 million investment, the company was structured to be a 50/50 joint venture between Gordon and JVC. As the company's chairman and chief executive officer, Gordon was responsible for the production of such films as Point Break (1991), starring Patrick Swayze and Keanu Reeves; The Super (1991), starring Joe Pesci; Unlawful Entry (1992), starring Kurt Russell, Ray Liotta and Madeleine Stowe; Used People (1992), starring Shirley MacLaine, Jessica Tandy, Kathy Bates, Marcia Gay Harden and Marcello Mastroianni; and Timecop (1994), starring Jean-Claude Van Damme. Largo also co-financed and handled the foreign distribution of the acclaimed 1992 biopic Malcolm X, directed by Spike Lee and starring Denzel Washington in the title role. In January 1994, Gordon left the company and forged a production deal at Universal. In 1999, JVC transferred Largo's film acquisition assets to JVC Entertainment, a film subsidiary for the Japanese market, and shut down its foreign sales operation. Largo's film library was acquired by InterMedia in 2001.

== Filmography ==
Release date	Title	Distributor	Notes	Budget	Gross (worldwide)
July 12, 1991	Point Break	20th Century Fox	co-production with Tapestry Films and Johnny Utah Productions	$24 million	$83.5 million
October 4, 1991	The Super	20th Century Fox	co-production with JVC Entertainment Networks	$22 million	$11 million
November 1, 1991	29th Street	20th Century Fox	co-production with JVC Entertainment Networks and Permut Productions	N/A	$2.1 million
June 26, 1992	Unlawful Entry	20th Century Fox	co-production with JVC Entertainment Networks	$23 million	$57.1 million
October 23, 1992	Dr. Giggles	Universal Pictures	co-production with Dark Horse Entertainment	N/A	$8.4 million
November 18, 1992	Malcolm X	Warner Bros. Pictures	co-production with 40 Acres and a Mule Filmworks	$35 million	$48.2 million
December 16, 1992	Used People	20th Century Fox	co-production with JVC Entertainment Networks and U.P. Productions	$16 million	$28 million
October 15, 1993	Judgment Night	Universal Pictures		$21 million	$12.1 million
February 11, 1994	The Getaway	Universal Pictures		$37 million	$30 million
September 16, 1994	Timecop	Universal Pictures	co-production with Signature Pictures, Renaissance Pictures and Dark Horse Entertainment	$27 million	$101.6 million
February 2, 1996	White Squall	Buena Vista Pictures	co-production with Hollywood Pictures and Scott Free Productions; also international distribution rights	$38 million	$10.2 million
April 26, 1996	Mulholland Falls	MGM/UA Distribution Co.	co-production with Metro-Goldwyn-Mayer Pictures, The Zanuck Company and PolyGram Filmed Entertainment	$29 million	$11.5 million
October 9, 1996	The Proprietor	Warner Bros.	co-production with Merchant Ivory Productions, Ognon Pictures and Fez Production Filmcilik	N/A	
November 29, 1996	Adrenalin: Fear the Rush	Legacy Releasing Corporation	co-production with Filmwerks and Toga Productions; distributed to home video by Buena Vista Home Video and Dimension Films	N/A	$37,536
January 31, 1997	Meet Wally Sparks	Trimark Pictures	co-production with The Greif Company	N/A	$4.1 million
March 14, 1997	City of Industry	Orion Pictures		$8 million	$1.5 million
April 19, 1997	Habitat	Sci-Fi Channel	made-for television film; co-production with Transfilm, Kingsborough Pictures, Ecotopia B.V. and August Entertainment	N/A	
1996	Omega Doom	Columbia TriStar Home Video	direct-to-video; co-production with Filmwerks	N/A	
July 11, 1997	This World, Then the Fireworks	Orion Pictures	co-production with Balzac's Shirt, Muse Productions and Wynard	N/A	$51,618
July 25, 1997	Box of Moonlight	Box of Moonlight Picture Corporation	co-production with Lakeshore Entertainment and Lemon Sky Productions	N/A	$782,641
August 22, 1997	G.I. Jane	Buena Vista Pictures	co-production with Hollywood Pictures, Caravan Pictures, Roger Birnbaum Productions and Scott Free Productions; also international distribution rights	$50 million	$48.1 million
February 27, 1998	Kissing a Fool	Universal Pictures	co-production with Rick Lashbrook Films	$19 million	$4.1 million
April 9, 1998	Shadow of Doubt	New City Releasing		N/A	
October 30, 1998	Vampires	Sony Pictures Releasing	co-production with Columbia Pictures, Storm King Productions, Film Office and Spooky Tooth Productions	$20 million	$20.3 million
December 30, 1998	Affliction	Lions Gate Films	co-production with Reisman Productions and Kingsgate Films	$6 million	$6.3 million
May 21, 1999	Finding Graceland	Columbia TriStar Home VIdeo	direct-to-video; co-production with TCB Productions and Avenue Pictures	N/A	
November 9, 1999	Bad Day on the Block	Columbia TriStar Home VIdeo	direct-to-video, co-production with Sheen/Michaels Entertainment	N/A	
February 15, 2000	Grey Owl	New City Releasing	co-production with Allied Filmmakers	$30 million	$632,617
