= Gary Scott Thompson =

American television producer (born 1959)

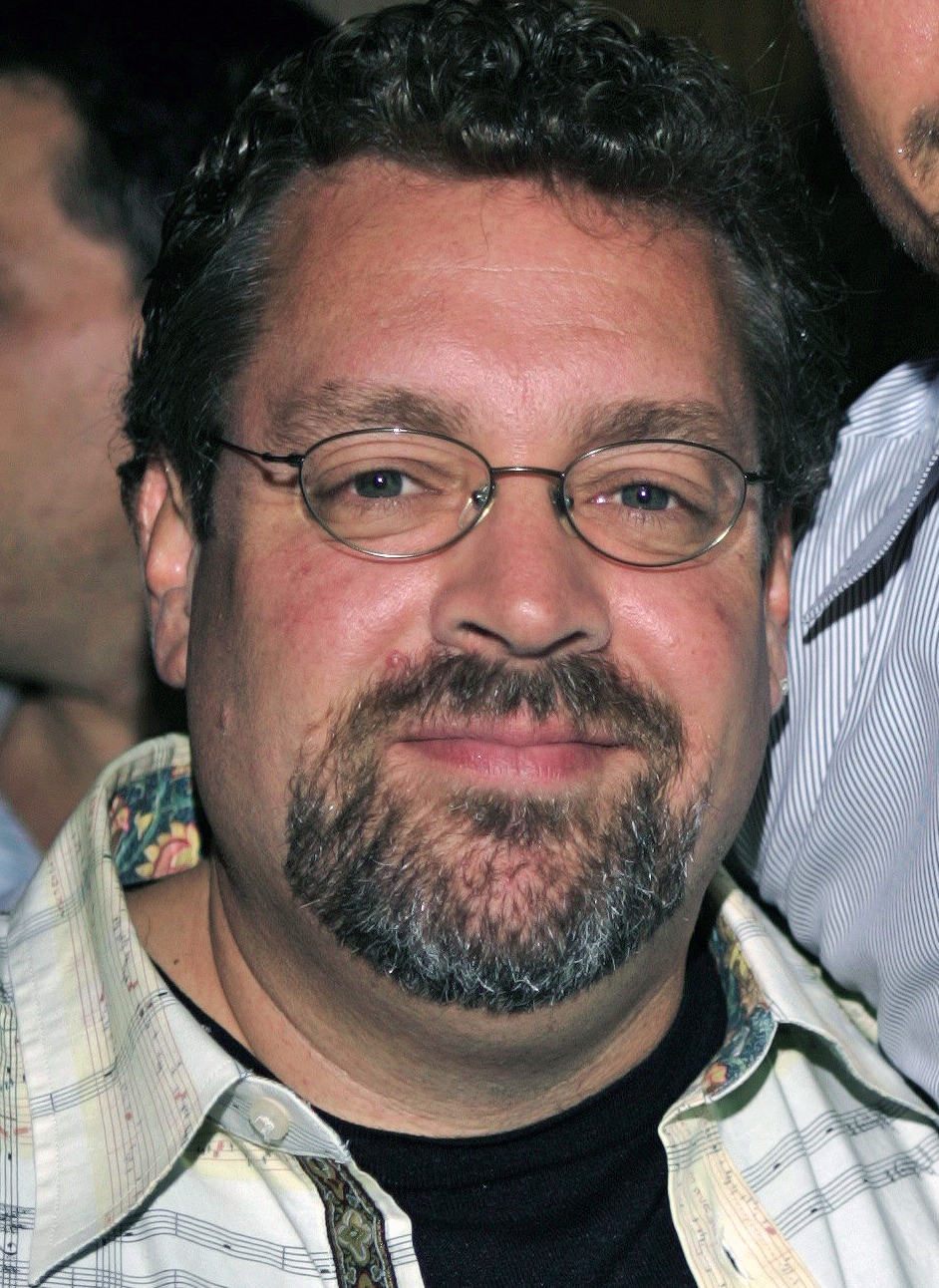
- Thompson in 2004
- Born: October 7, 1959 (age 67); Ukiah, California, U.S.
- Education: New York University (MFA)
- Occupations: Director, screenwriter, television producer
- Years active: 1987-present

Gary Scott Thompson (born October 7, 1959) is an American screenwriter, television producer, and director. He worked on projects including The Fast and the Furious, its sequel 2 Fast 2 Furious; Hollow Man, Split Second; 88 Minutes, K-911 and K-9: P.I.

Thompson was the creator, showrunner, writer, and executive producer of NBC's comedy-drama series Las Vegas, and he also directed four episodes and made a brief cameo as a psychotherapy patient. Additionally, Thompson wrote, co-developed, and executive produced NBC and TF1's Taxi Brooklyn.

== Life and career ==
Born in Ukiah, California, Thompson spent much of his childhood in Pago Pago, American Samoa.

He first worked in the entertainment industry as an actor, studying under such actors as Powers Boothe at the Pacific Conservatory of the Performing Arts.

Eventually settling on writing, he received a Master of Fine Arts degree from New York University and went to work as a playwright. Thompson's theater credits include Small Town Syndrome, Cowboys Don't Cry, and Private Hells.

In 1991, Thompson created the company Pago Pago Productions, located in Encino, California.

Thompson now resides in Los Angeles with his wife and two children.

== Awards ==
For Las Vegas, Thompson received the honor of Best Drama Series at the WIN Awards, an awards show dedicated to highlighting positive and multi-dimensional portrayals of women in media.

Additionally, Thompson received the inaugural Visionary Award from Life Rolls On, a spinal cord injury advocacy organization, for his portrayal of the first featured character with a spinal cord injury on national television.

== Filmography ==
=== Film ===
Year	Title	Writer	Producer	Director
1987	The Underachievers	Yes	No	Jackie Kong
1988	White Ghost	Yes	No	BJ Davis
1992	Split Second	Yes	Associate	Tony Maylam; Ian Sharp
2000	Hollow Man	Story	No	Paul Verhoeven
2001	The Fast and the Furious	Yes	No	Rob Cohen
2003	2 Fast 2 Furious	Story	No	John Singleton
2007	88 Minutes	Yes	Yes	Jon Avnet
2024	Gunner	Yes	No	Dimitri Logothetis
2025	Trap House	Yes	No	Michael Dowse

Direct-to-video

Year	Title	Writer	Producer	Director
1999	K-911	Yes	No	Charles Kanganis
2002	K-9: P.I.	Yes	No	Richard Lewis
2003	Timecop 2: The Berlin Decision	Yes	Co-Producer	Steve Boyum
2006	Hollow Man 2	Story	No	Claudio Fäh

Thompson has a "Based on characters created by" credit in the Fast & Furious films and series in which he did not participate.

=== Television ===
Year	Title	Director	Writer	Producer	Creator	Notes
1999	The Angry Beavers	No	Yes	No	No	Segment "Stump's Family Reunion"
2003–2008	Las Vegas	Yes	Yes	Executive	Yes	Director (4 episodes); Writer (20 episodes)
2005	The WIN Awards	No	No	Yes	No	TV special
2008–2009	Knight Rider	Yes	Yes	Executive	No	Writer and director (Episode "Exit Light, Enter Knight"; Writer (2 episodes)
2014	Taxi Brooklyn	No	Yes	Executive	Developer	Writer (4 episodes)

TV movies

Year	Title	Writer	Executive Producer
2007	Protect and Serve	No	Yes
TBA	God's Country	Yes	Yes

Appearances as himself

Year	Title	Episode
2003	Intimate Portrait	"Vanessa Marcil"
2007	TV Land Confidential	"Locations"
2008	Las Vegas	"3 Babes, 100 Guns and a Fat Chick"
