= Charles Fries (producer) =

American television and film producer (1928–2021)

Charles William Fries (September 30, 1928 – April 22, 2021) was an American film and television producer who worked on many TV series, made-for-TV movies, and theatrical films.

The Cincinnati, Ohio-born Fries moved to Los Angeles in 1952 and began working for the production and syndication company Ziv Television Programs. He later worked at Screen Gems, Columbia Pictures, and Metromedia. In 1974, he formed Charles Fries Productions, which later became Fries Entertainment, where he produced and/or supervised more than 275 hours of television movies and mini-series.

Among the projects he produced are The Amazing Spider-Man television series, which aired in the USA between 1977 and 1979; the 1980 television miniseries The Martian Chronicles, based on the book by Ray Bradbury; the 1981 television docudrama Bitter Harvest; and the 1989 made-for-TV movies Small Sacrifices and The Neon Empire.

For theatrical release, he produced or was involved in the productions of the 1982 film Cat People, the 1986 skateboarding film Thrashin', and the 1989 film Troop Beverly Hills, which is based on a play written by actress Susan Davis, which was produced at Theatre West, and partly inspired by his wife, Ava Ostern Fries' experiences with a Beverly Hills Girl Scout troop. Ava produced the film and Fries executive produced.

Fries has a star on the Hollywood Walk of Fame since 1978. In 1986 he moved the star from the north side of Hollywood Blvd to the sidewalk in front of the building he occupied at 6922 Hollywood Blvd.

== Early life ==
Fries was born in Cincinnati, the son of Gladys E. (Guethlein) and Charles M. Fries. Fries worked for his father's produce company, Charles Fries Produce, while attending Elder High School in Cincinnati. He graduated in 1946 and went on to attend Ohio State University, where he became a member of the Sigma Alpha Epsilon fraternity. After graduating from Ohio State in 1950, Fries continued to work for his father's produce company. In 1952, his uncle, Joe Moore, who worked at Ziv Television Programs, offered Fries the opportunity to move to California and work for the company, launching his career in the entertainment industry.

== Education ==
He graduated from Ohio State University, where he subsequently achieved an Honorary Doctor of Fine Arts degree. He became vice-president in charge of production for Screen Gems, the Columbia Pictures Television arm and subsequently became vice president in charge of feature film production/administration for the parent company where he worked with the top producers and directors in the industry after serving in various production and administrative capacities in the entertainment industry.

== Ziv Television Programs, Inc. ==
Fries began to work for Ziv Television in 1952 at California Studios, which is now known as Raleigh Studios, in Hollywood, California. During his eight years at Ziv, the company produced shows such as The Cisco Kid, Highway Patrol, and Sea Hunt. "Television was a cottage industry in 1952, when I came on the scene. The Ziv office staff in Hollywood was very small, probably no more than fifteen people."

With Fries running the company's production and studio operations, Ziv became one of the more prominent independent TV syndication companies. Rather than only buying commercial air time on TV, advertisers during this period would typically buy entire programs, such as General Electric Theater hosted by Ronald Reagan and Texaco Star Theater hosted by Milton Berle. Ziv and other syndication companies would fashion a show for an advertiser by tailoring main titles and commercials to air in the number of cities that the advertiser would "buy." These specially fashioned titles and commercials made it look like the advertiser owned and produced the entire series. The rise of network television ultimately prompted company founder Frederick Ziv to sell the company to United Artists in 1960.

== Screen Gems ==
Fries parted ways with Ziv and was appointed Vice President In Charge of Production for Screen Gems, the Columbia Pictures television arm, in 1960. He was involved in the production of such series as Naked City, Route 66, Bewitched, Father Knows Best, and I Dream of Jeannie, during which he became lifelong friends with that sitcom's lead actress Barbara Eden. Years later, I Dream of Jeannie actor Larry Hagman confided to Fries that during production of the series, Hagman despised the bosses at Columbia and Screen Gems with such fervor that he once hired an airplane to fly over the studio so he could urinate out the window onto the buildings.

While working at Screen Gems, Fries took a meeting at the famed Polo Lounge at the Beverly Hills Hotel with Harold Cohen, a former lawyer at several Hollywood talent agencies who was currently between jobs and looking to begin a new career as a producer. Fries arrived for an 8:00 a.m. breakfast meeting to find that Cohen's tablecloth was already soiled.

When Fries asked what had happened, Cohen admitted that he'd already had a meeting with someone at 7:30. "I had some coffee with him and I'm gonna have my grapefruit now", Cohen said. After the meeting, Fries was getting up to leave when somebody else showed up at Cohen's table for an 8:45 meeting. This particular meeting between Fries and Cohen would ultimately result in Screen Gems placing the variety show The Johnny Cash Show on the air. It ran for two seasons.

== Columbia and Metromedia ==
In 1968, Fries became Vice President In Charge of Feature Film Production for Columbia Pictures, where he worked on theatrical films such as Castle Keep (with Burt Lancaster), The Horsemen (with Jack Palance), Five Easy Pieces (with Jack Nicholson and Karen Black), and Getting Straight (with Elliott Gould and Candice Bergen).

After two years at Columbia, Fries became Executive Vice President In Charge of Production for Metromedia, where he produced and supervised 26 movies for television and 13 television series, including The Undersea World of Jacques Cousteau.

== Fries Entertainment ==
In 1974, Fries established Charles Fries Productions, later known as Fries Entertainment, where he produced and/or supervised more than 275 hours of television movies and mini-series. It was earlier known as Alpine Productions, and signed to a contract with television distributor/producer Worldvision Enterprises.

In 1986, Fries Entertainment, who became the world's largest television producer, whose subsidiaries include Fries Distribution Company and Fries Home Video, was making territorial deals for one picture for which it acquired the overseas theatrical sales rights, and Fries Entertainment had two other activities during the MIFED (Mercato internazionale del film e del documentario) market to find partners for production of "low-medium range budget pictures" and pick ups of international distribution, while selling projects by different companies.

By the following year, in 1987, Fries Entertainment had made the key rounds of theatrical output and becoming impressed with the opportunities the foreign market represents, and had to upgrade its international theatrical sales division, which was headed by Larry Friedricks, to place greater emphasis on the unit, and the division was now known as Fries Foreign Theatrical, with Friedricks handling senior vice president of foreign distribution, and Tracy Levin as director, and decided to place in a stronger pitch for acquisitions only for its overseas theatrical sales unit, but also for the company's well-known syndication, and all home video rights.

That year, Fries Entertainment is signing a deal to sell overseas rights to three pictures that were produced by Sandy Howard, in which the three films represented by Fries were the film productions Green Monkey, Dark Tower, and worldwide, except TV rights, which was ITC's TV bailiwick on the project Calhoun, which these films were represented in partnership with international sales agent Spectrafilm, and Sandy Howard Productions, who had a contract agreement.

In late March 1987, Fries started its own home video division, Fries Home Video, to be headed by former International Video Entertainment executive Len Levy, as executive vice president and CEO, and the company previously had an agreement in 1986 with home video firm Prism Entertainment to handle home video rights to Fries' titles, and would sign a deal to acquire the video distribution rights of Monterey Home Video from IVE, and the long-term strategy could make and broaden the whole entire Fries Home Video label into a one-stop shopping organization that can acquire and exploit outside product.

Fries Entertainment would later close in the mid 90s amidst ongoing debt obligations to Crédit Lyonnais. Resulting in its library being incorporated into Epic Productions. Metro-Goldwyn-Mayer now owns most of the library through its Orion Pictures subsidiary via PolyGram Filmed Entertainment, who acquired Epic's library in 1997.

== Awards ==
Fries was awarded a star on the Hollywood Walk of Fame. His films have garnered the Emmy, Peabody, Humanitas, and Christopher Awards among others from selected film festivals. He was awarded a special honor by ICAN: The Interagency for Child Abuse and Neglect.

From Ohio State University he received an honorary degree, Doctor of the Arts, presented by the president of the university. He also received the Frederick W. Ziv Award from the University of Cincinnati at a formal presentation.

== Stage plays ==
His concept for the play, The Color of Rose, a three-women show about the life of Rose Fitzgerald Kennedy, was also presented at the Douglas Theatre and opened at the Emerson College Theatre in Boston in January 2011.

== Later life ==
Fries was a member of the Academy of Television Arts and Sciences, where he served on the Board of Governors and as treasurer and secretary of the foundation. He was also a member of the Academy of Motion Picture Arts and Sciences, where he served on the Executive Branch Membership Committee. He was awarded a lifetime membership in the Producers Guild of America, where he launched the guild's black tie awards event in 1998 creating a financial base from which he was instrumental in formulating the guild's strategic plan of reorganization.

He was also active at the Center Theatre Group (The Ahmanson, Mark Taper Forum and Kirk Douglas Theatres), where he served on the board and the executive committee, and as vice president. He was co-chair with his wife, Ava Ostern Fries, of the executive committee of the CTG Entertainment Circle and through an association with a constituent group, Center Theatre Group Affiliates, he co-chaired a number of events.

== Filmography ==
- Maybe I'll Come Home in the Spring (1971) (executive producer – as Charles Fries)
- A Tattered Web (1971) (executive producer – as Charles Fries)
- Thief (1971) (executive producer)
- Murder Once Removed (1971) (executive producer – as Charles Fries)
- The People (1972) (executive producer)
- She Waits (1972) (executive producer – as Charles Fries)
- Future Shock (1972) (executive producer)
- Heat of Anger (1972) (executive producer)
- Tales from the Crypt (1972) (executive producer – as Charles Fries)
- The Trial of Lee Harvey Oswald (1977) (executive producer – as Charles Fries)
- The Greatest Thing That Almost Happened (1977) (executive producer)
- Halloween with the New Addams Family (1977) (executive producer)
- The Winds of Kitty Hawk (1978) (executive producer – as Charles Fries)
- The Martian Chronicles (TV Mini-Series) (executive producer)
- High Noon, Part II: The Return of Will Kane (1980) (executive producer – as Charles Fries)
- Memorial Day (1983) (executive producer)
- The Zany Adventures of Robin Hood (1984) (executive producer)
- Flowers in the Attic (1987) (executive producer)
- Peacemaker (1990) (executive producer)
- K-9000 (1991) (executive producer)
- The Last P.O.W.? The Bobby Garwood Story (1993)

== Bibliography ==
- 2003, Chuck Fries, Irv Wilson, Spencer Green ·We'll Never Be Young Again: Remembering the Last Days of John F. Kennedy. ISBN 9781931290517
- 2010, Chuck Fries Godfather of the Television Movie: A History of Television ISBN 9781439259887
