= Christine Tucci =

American actress (born 1967)

- Occupation: Actress
- Years active: 1993–present
- Known for: Big Fat Liar; Another World; MDs; C-16: FBI
- Spouse: Vincent Angell (m. 1999)
- Children: 1
- Relatives: Stanley Tucci (brother)

Christine Tucci (/ˈtuːtʃi/) is an American actress.

== Life and career ==
Tucci, an Italian-American, is the daughter of Joan (née Tropiano), a retired secretary and writer, and Stanley Tucci, Sr., a retired high school art teacher, both of whom have roots in the town of Marzi in Calabria.

Tucci had a semi-regular role on the television series MDs (2002) and played Amanda Cory on the soap opera Another World from 1993 to 1995. She was a regular cast member on C-16: FBI, in the role of Special Agent Annie Rooney, from 1997 to 1998. She played Sergeant Welles in the movie K-911, released direct-to-video in 1999; in 2000, she made an appearance as Dr. Kiera Behrle on CSI: Crime Scene Investigation. She appeared in the 2003 TV movie Straight from the Heart as Carla Dimaggio.

== Personal life ==
Tucci married Vincent Angell in 1999. They have one son, who is autistic. Tucci and Angell played parents of an autistic boy on an episode of Without a Trace. Fellow actor Stanley Tucci is her brother.

== Filmography ==
=== Film ===
Year	Title	Role	Notes
1996	Big Night	Woman Singer	
1996	'M' Word	Nicole	
1997	Private Parts	Doctor	
1999	K-911	Sgt. Welles	
2002	Big Fat Liar	Carol Shepherd	
2004	Chestnut: Hero of Central Park	Laura Tomley	
2005	Tom's Nu Heaven	Dr. Tammy	

=== Television ===
Year	Title	Role	Notes
1993–1995	Another World	Amanda Cory	37 episodes
1997	Back to the Bone	Martina Dobbs	Television film
1998	The Closer	Carrie Dover	Episode: "The Rebound"; Episode: "The Hand That Rocks the Office"
1997–1998	C-16: FBI	Annie Rooney	13 episodes
1998	Fantasy Island	Kay Rose	Episode: "Handymen"
1999	ER	Paula Trancoso, Chicago Gazette	Episode: "Greene with Envy"
1999	Diagnosis: Murder	Denise Steiner	Episode: "The Mouth That Roared"
1999	The Practice	Susan Fennick	Episode: "Bay of Pigs"
2000	Popular	Jamie Gunn	Episode: "Ex, Lies and Videotape"
1998–2000	Chicago Hope	Dr. Rose Weber	Episode: "Austin Space"; Episode: "The Breast and the Brightest"; Episode: "Viagra-Vated Assault"; Episode: "Gun with the Wind"; Episode: "McNeil and Pray"; Episode: "Adventures in Babysitting"; Episode: "Gray Matters"
2000	Ally McBeal	Nancy Raleigh Sicland	Episode: "Prime Suspect"
2000	Bull	Jessica Bell	Episode: "Final Hour"; Episode: "The Quick Hit"
2000	The Fugitive	Dr. Jean Trabant	Episode: "Sanctuary"
2000	CSI: Crime Scene Investigation	Dr. Kiera Behrle	Episode: "Unfriendly Skies"
1997–2000	Prince Street		Episode: "Pilot"; Episode: "God Bless America"; Episode: Everyday People"; Episode: Drugs, Lies and Videotape": Episode: "Father and Sons"; Episode: "A Room Without a View"
2001	NYPD Blue	Ellen Gilbert Scott	Episode: "In-Laws, Outlaws"
2001	The Fighting Fitzgeralds	Marilyn Bish	Episode: "The Loud Man"
2001	Philly	A.D.A. Sandy Rudin	Episode: "Prisoner of Love"
2002	MDs	Dr. Terri Calamari	Episode: "Time of Death"; Episode: "A La Casa"; Episode: "Open Heart"; Episode: "Cruel and Unusual"; Episode: "R.I.P."; Episode: "Wing and a Prayer"
2003	Straight from the Heart	Carla Dimaggio	Television film
2005	Without a Trace	Kate Norville	Episode: "Volcano"
2005	Six Feet Under	Marianne	Episode: "The Rainbow of Her Reasons"; Episode: "The Silence"; Episode: "Singing for Our Lives"; Episode: "Static"
2005	Wanted	Dr. Deborah Lavee	Episode: "Judas"
2004–2007	Boston Legal	D.A. Mary Ann Huff	Episode: "Catch and Release"; Episode: "Fat Burner"
2006–2007	The Minor Accomplishments of Jackie Woodman	Joan	Episode: "Pounded"; Episode: "Dykes Like Us"
2011	Mad	Attorney, Mom, Chloe Sullivan (voice)	Episode: "The Social Netjerk / Smallville: Turn Off the Clark"

== Soundtrack ==
Year	Production	Notes
1996	Big Night	Genre: Comedy-drama film performer: "O Sole Mio"
