= Charles Gordon (producer) =

American film, television, and executive producer (1947–2020)

Charles Gordon (May 13, 1947 – October 31, 2020) was an American film producer and brother to Lawrence Gordon. The Gordons were raised in a Jewish family in Belzoni, Mississippi.

Gordon was married to his wife, Lynda, for 50 years until he died of cancer on October 31, 2020, in Los Angeles. He was 73 years old.

Gordon had 3 daughters, Jamie, Kate, and Lily.

== Selected filmography ==
He was a producer in all films unless otherwise noted.

=== Film ===
Year	Film	Credit	Notes
1986	Night of the Creeps	Producer	
1988	The Wrong Guys	Producer	
1988	Die Hard	Executive producer	
1989	Leviathan	Executive producer	
1989	Field of Dreams	Producer	
1989	K-9	Producer	
1989	Lock Up	Producer	
1990	Die Hard 2	Producer	
1991	The Rocketeer	Producer	
1991	The Super	Producer	
1992	Unlawful Entry	Producer	
1995	Waterworld	Producer	
1997	Trojan War	Producer	
1999	October Sky	Producer	
2004	The Girl Next Door	Producer	
2007	Hitman	Producer	
2015	Hitman: Agent 47	Producer	

As an actor

Year	Film	Role	Notes
2004	The Girl Next Door	Passenger at Airport	Uncredited

=== Television ===
Year	Title	Credit	Notes
1983	The Renegades	Executive producer	
1983	Just Our Luck	Executive producer	
1983	Lone Star	Executive producer	Television film
1984	The Streets	Executive producer	Television film
1985	Our Family Honor	Executive producer	
1997	Things That Go Bump	Executive producer	Television film
TBA	Hitman	Executive producer	
