= K-9: P.I. =

- Official DVD cover
- Directed by: Richard J. Lewis
- Written by: Gary Scott Thompson
- Produced by: Ron French
- Starring: James Belushi; Gary Basaraba
- Cinematography: Roy H. Wagner
- Edited by: Ron Wisman
- Music by: Nick Pierone
- Distributed by: Universal Studios Home Video
- Release date: July 30, 2002
- Running time: 95 minutes
- Countries: United States; Canada
- Language: English

K-9: P.I. is a 2002 American direct-to-video buddy cop comedy film, directed by Richard J. Lewis and starring James Belushi. The film serves as the fourth and final installment in the K-9 film series; and is the sequel to K-911.

After retiring from the LAPD, Detective Michael Dooley (Belushi) and his lovable K-9 Partner Jerry Lee go on one last adventure before they retire and start to enjoy the good life.

== Plot ==
After retiring, Detective Dooley and Jerry Lee have a retirement party with all of their friends. After the party, Dooley and Jerry Lee are both drunk. They enter LA Micro Labs and find a dead security guard apparently shot by criminals who have stolen a chip. Jerry Lee and Dooley must now track down the criminals and retrieve the chip.

== Cast ==
- James Belushi as Michael Dooley
- Gary Basaraba as Pete Timmons
- Kim Huffman as Laura Fields
- Jody Racicot as Maurice
- Christopher Shyer as Charles Thyer
- Barbara Tyson as Catherine
- Blu Mankuma as Captain Thomas
- Duncan Fraser as Frankie the Fence
- Jason Schombing as Carlos Cuesta
- Kevin Durand as Agent Verner
- Matthew Bennett as Agent Henry
- Jay Brazeau as Dr. Tilley
- Sarah Carter as Babe
- Terry Chen as Sato
- Dean Choe as Thief
- Michael Eklund as Billy Cochran
- G. Michael Gray as Junkie
- Ellie Harvie as Jackie Von Jarvis
- Dee Jay Jackson as Auto Pool Guy
- David Lewis as Jack Von Jarvis
- Angela Moore as Angie
- Natassia Malthe as Dirty Dancer (as Lina Teal)
- King as Jerry Lee

== Reception ==
On Rotten Tomatoes the film has an approval rating of 0% based 6 reviews.

== See also ==
- List of films with a 0% rating on Rotten Tomatoes
- List of media set in San Diego
