= Unlawful Entry (film) =

1992 film

- Theatrical release poster
- Directed by: Jonathan Kaplan
- Screenplay by: Lewis Colick
- Story by: George D. Putnam; John Katchmer; Lewis Colick
- Produced by: Charles Gordon; Sulla Hamer; Gene Levy
- Starring: Kurt Russell; Ray Liotta; Madeleine Stowe
- Cinematography: Jamie Anderson
- Edited by: Curtiss Clayton
- Music by: James Horner
- Production company: Largo Entertainment
- Distributed by: 20th Century Fox
- Release date: June 26, 1992
- Running time: 112 minutes
- Country: United States
- Language: English
- Budget: $23 million
- Box office: $57.1 million (US)

Unlawful Entry is a 1992 American psychological thriller film directed by Jonathan Kaplan, and starring Kurt Russell, Madeleine Stowe and Ray Liotta.

The film involves a couple who befriend a lonely policeman, only for him to develop an unrequited fixation on the wife, leading to chilling consequences. The movie received generally positive reviews, especially for Ray Liotta's performance, for which he was nominated for an MTV Movie Award for Best Villain in 1993 for his portrayal of the psychopathic cop.

== Plot ==
One night, an intruder enters Michael and Karen Carr's upscale Los Angeles home. Karen is briefly taken hostage at knifepoint before the burglar escapes. Police arrive and one officer, Pete Davis, takes an extra interest in their case due to their considerate approach. He later cuts through departmental red tape and helps install a security system in their house. Appreciating Pete's assistance, the Carrs befriend him.

When Michael jokingly expresses interest in getting revenge on the intruder, Pete invites him on a ride-along with him and his partner, Roy Cole. Initially, the ride-along is enjoyable, as Michael witnesses Pete and Cole engage in their nightly police routine, including stopping a woman who was speeding, having food at a takeaway, and responding to a domestic disturbance. But after dropping Cole off, Pete reveals to Michael he has located the burglar who invaded the Carrs' house, and offers Michael an opportunity to retaliate for the attack on Karen. Michael declines, admitting he wasn't serious about personally taking revenge, but Pete becomes insistent and demanding. When the burglar attempts escape, Pete brutally beats him before Michael orders him to stop.

Distrusting Pete's emotional instability and overprotective behavior, Michael implores Karen to avoid him, though Karen believes Michael is overreacting. When Pete arrives at Michael's club, Michael condemns Pete's behavior and demands he stay away from him and Karen. Pete later meets Karen for coffee and begins intruding in her marriage with Michael, believing that Michael is too weak and cowardly to stand up for Karen.

Angered at Michael's lack of gratitude and rejection, Pete harasses Michael by damaging his finances, and breaks into their house at night. When Michael files a complaint against Pete's behavior, Pete uses his police connections to destroy Michael's business reputation. Advised by his lawyer, Michael tries bribing Pete with $5000 and apologizes for his rejection, but Pete rejects Michael's offer and reveals his obsession with Karen, and when Michael asks Pete if he'll try to arrest him, he declares he would rather kill Michael. Michael warns Karen about Pete's obsession and demands she stay away from him. When Michael turns to Roy Cole for help, Cole orders his partner to seek psychiatric help or be reported. Instead, Pete murders Cole, blames the murder on a known criminal, and plants cocaine in the Carrs' house to frame Michael, enabling Pete to pursue Karen. Unknown to Pete, however, Michael's lawyer arranges bail for his client, who begins rushing home.

Back at the Carr house, Pete forces himself inside while Karen is sleeping and murders Penny, Karen's friend. Karen awakens to find Pete cooking dinner, where Pete declares he loves Karen, but unknown to Pete, Karen discovers Penny's corpse. Karen pretends she loves Pete as a ruse to reach his gun, and attempts to shoot him, but the gun is empty. Realizing Karen does not love him, an enraged Pete dismisses her as worthless and attempts to rape her, but is distracted by his car alarm. After finding his car vandalized, he realizes that Michael has returned home. The couple attempt to escape, but Pete attacks, attempting to kill them both, and he and Michael get into a vicious fight. When Pete accidentally alerts the security company, he attempts to cancel the emergency response by posing as Michael on the phone, but gives the wrong security code, unaware Michael changed it. Realizing the police are on their way, Pete attempts to get Karen to escape with him, threatening to kill Michael if she doesn't, but Karen instead uses a diamond ornament to strike Pete in the face, allowing Michael to kick Pete in the groin and hook him in the face which knocks him down the stairs, then Michael grabs Pete's police gun to shoot him in case he wakes up.

While the couple waits for police to arrive, Pete regains consciousness as Michael holds him at gunpoint. Pete, convinced Michael will not shoot him, tauntingly asks him, "You gonna make the citizen's arrest?", unknowingly asking the same question Michael asked him in their earlier confrontation. To Pete's shock, Michael chooses to shoot him and fires multiple bullets, ultimately killing Pete, before Michael drops the gun out of exhaustion and goes to sit with Karen outside as the police arrive.

== Cast ==
- Kurt Russell as Michael Carr
- Ray Liotta as Officer Pete Davis
- Madeleine Stowe as Karen Carr
- Roger E. Mosley as Officer Roy Cole
- Ken Lerner as Roger Graham
- Deborah Offner as Penny
- Carmen Argenziano as Jerome Lurie
- Andy Romano as Captain Hayes
- Harry Northup as Sgt. McMurtry
- Sherri Rose as girl in jeep
- Dick Miller as impound clerk

== Production ==
=== Development ===
On April 26, 1991, Daily Variety reported that Largo Entertainment's upcoming production would be Unlawful Entry, a psychological thriller set to begin principal photography in late summer 1991 in Los Angeles, California. The film includes a scene in which Ray Liotta's character, a police officer, violently assaults an African American suspect. This scene was scripted before the Rodney King beating by Los Angeles police officers on March 3, 1991. Although the filming occurred before that incident, director Jonathan Kaplan mentioned that he attempted to "ignore it because the movie's not really about that." However, following the officers' acquittal on April 29, 1992, and the subsequent riots in Los Angeles, the perception regarding urban violence in films underwent a change. While the scene was considered crucial to the plot and could not be removed, Kaplan and producer Charles Gordon edited out most of the "lengthy" sequence. In May 1992, the film's release date was shifted from late 1992 to June 26, 1992.

=== Filming ===
Principal photography began on October 25, 1991. Filming took place in and around Los Angeles, California. The house that was used for the Carr residence in the film is located at 546 Wilcox Ave. The school sequence was filmed at Doris Place Elementary School. The sequence in which Michael is in jail was filmed at Lincoln Heights Jail. Production wrapped on February 5, 1992.

=== Soundtrack ===
Unlawful Entry (Original Motion Picture Soundtrack)

Soundtrack album by James Horner
- Released: 1993
- Genres: Soundtrack, Score
- Label: Intrada Records
- Producer: James Horner

The original soundtrack was composed by James Horner. It was released on Intrada Records, an extended version of the soundtrack was released by La-La Land Records in 2017.

The movie featured several songs that were not included on the soundtrack. "Pa La Ocha Tambo" and "Just a Little Dream" by Eddie Palmieri, "National Crime Awareness Week (Alfred Hitchcock Presents Mix)" by Sparks, Everybody's Free to Feel Good" by Rozalla, and "Don't Go to Strangers" by J. J. Cale.

US CD (Intrada Records) track listing

All tracks written and composed by James Horner.

1. "Main Title" - 3:14
2. "Intruder" - 2:08
3. "Being Watched" - 5:42
4. "Leon's Death" - 3:01
5. "Drug Bust" - 3:06
6. "Bail Denied" - 2:26
7. "Pete's Passion" - 11:15
8. "End Credits" - 4:22

== Reception ==
=== Box office ===
The film was released in the U.S. on June 26, 1992, opening at #2 in 1,511 theaters, an average of $6,662 per theater. Grossing $10,067,609 in the opening weekend, it went on to gross $57,138,719 in the domestic market. It was a box-office success, and brought back its $23 million budget.

=== Critical response ===
On Rotten Tomatoes, 76% of reviews are positive from 37 critics, with an average rating of 6.3/10. The critical consensus reads, "Unlawful Entry may not depict a particularly novel or believable situation, but tense direction and a roundly committed cast make it easy to get caught up in the moment." Metacritic, which uses a weighted average, assigned the film a score of 61 out of 100, based on 25 reviews, indicating "generally favorable reviews". Audiences polled by CinemaScore gave it an average grade of "B" on an A+ to F scale.

Roger Ebert praised director Jonathan Kaplan for giving the film's story a sense of realism with its locations, characters with "unstrained realism" from the actors and having "undertones of a serious social drama" when confronting fears about a delusional police authority. Variety's Todd McCarthy wrote that despite being another film that follows in the mould of Fatal Attraction, he called it "a very effective victimization thriller", praising both Liotta and Russell's performances and Kaplan's direction of the script into "areas of social and class-structure observations" when dealing with unhinged police figures in an urban setting. In her review for The New York Times, Janet Maslin was critical of the three main leads lacking depth and substance in the motivations of their characters but gave credit to Liotta for giving "complexity" to his role, a solid supporting cast and the "level-headed" direction Kaplan takes with the plot, even as it stretches credibility.

=== Home media ===
The film was released on VHS on February 3, 1993, by Fox Video. On July 21, 2026, the film got re-released on a 4K collector's edition, by Shout! Studios.

== See also ==
- List of American films of 1992
- List of films featuring home invasions
