= K-911 =

- Official DVD cover
- Directed by: Charles T. Kanganis
- Written by: Gary Scott Thompson
- Produced by: David Bixler
- Starring: James Belushi; Christine Tucci; James Handy; Wade Williams
- Cinematography: George Mooradian
- Edited by: Carter DeHaven
- Music by: Stephen Edwards
- Distributed by: Universal Studios Home Video
- Release date: December 12, 1999
- Running time: 91 minutes
- Country: United States
- Language: English

K-911 is a 1999 American buddy cop comedy film released direct-to-video, a direct-sequel to K-9, and the third installment in the K-9 film series. It was directed by Charles T. Kanganis and stars James Belushi as Detective Michael Dooley.

== Synopsis ==
Det. Dooley and his German Shepherd dog companion Jerry Lee set out to find a murderous man who plans to kill Dooley. During the movie, Jerry Lee becomes tired, and begins to fail doing his normal way of life. They also reluctantly team up with Sergeant Wendy Welles and her Doberman Pinscher, Zeus, who, according to Welles, was trained in the Netherlands and listen to commands in Dutch (although in reality the commands are in German). Eventually, they discover the attempter: a psychotic man named Devon Lane who thought Dooley's wife, Tracy, loved him more than she did her own husband just because she said that he "had talent". He also believes that Dooley was responsible for Tracy's death. Devon attempts to kill Dooley in a climatic showdown and, just in time, Jerry Lee jumps, tackles Devon, and takes him out. Devon is then arrested and Dooley is taken to the hospital for gunshot wounds. The film ends with Jerry Lee and Dooley holding hands while sharing an intimate moment.

== Cast ==
- James Belushi as Det. Dooley
- Christine Tucci as Sgt. Welles
- James Handy as Capt. Byers
- Wade Williams as Devon Lane
- Vincent Castellanos as Harry Stripe
- Ron Yuan as Jackie Hammonds
- Denise Dowse as Dr. Perkins
- Mac, Sonto, Reno as Jerry Lee
- Lucan, Taze, Jasmine as Zeus
- Timo Flloko as Johnson
- Scotch Ellis Loring as SWAT Leader

== Reception ==
On Rotten Tomatoes the film has an approval rating of 17% based on reviews from 6 critics. Susan King of the Los Angeles Times wrote that film "strains credibility", but Mac is a "joy to watch" as Jerry Lee.

== Sequel ==
A sequel to the film, titled K-9: P.I., was released direct-to-video on July 30, 2002.
