= Durham =

Durham most commonly refers to:

- Durham, England, a cathedral city in north east England
  - County Durham, a ceremonial county which includes Durham
- Durham, North Carolina, a city in North Carolina, United States

Durham may also refer to:

== Places ==
=== Australia ===
- Durham, Queensland, an outback locality in the Bulloo Shire, Queensland
  - Durham Downs Station, a pastoral station in Durham, Queensland
- Durham Downs, Queensland, a rural locality in the Maranoa Region
- Durham Lead, Victoria, a locality in the City of Ballarat
- Durham Ox, Victoria, a locality in the Shire of Loddin

=== Canada ===
- Durham, Nova Scotia
- Durham, Ontario, a small town in Grey County, Ontario
- Durham County, Ontario, a historic county
- Regional Municipality of Durham, a regional government in the Greater Toronto Area of Ontario
  - Durham (electoral district), a federal electoral district in Durham Region
  - Durham (provincial electoral district), a provincial electoral district in Durham Region
- Durham Bridge, New Brunswick
- Durham Parish, New Brunswick
- Durham-Sud, Quebec (also known as South Durham)

=== United Kingdom ===
==== England ====
- County Palatine of Durham, a historic ecclesiastical county
- Durham (non-metropolitan district), a former local government district, which held city status 1974–2009
- Durham and Framwelgate, a former local government borough that held city status until 1974
- County Durham (district), a unitary authority area

==== Scotland ====
- Kirkpatrick Durham, a village and parish in Dumfries and Galloway, Scotland

=== United States ===
- Durham, Arkansas
- Durham, California
- Durham, Colorado, a place in Mesa County
- Durham, Connecticut, a New England town
  - Durham (CDP), Connecticut, the central village in the town
- Durham, Florida, a place in Calhoun County
- Durham, Georgia
- Durham Township, Hancock County, Illinois
- Durham, La Porte County, Indiana, a place in New Durham Township
- Durham, Kansas
- Durham, Maine
- Durham, Missouri
- Durham, New Hampshire, a New England town
  - Durham (CDP), New Hampshire, the main community in the town
- Durham, New York
- Durham, North Carolina, the most populous US city with this name
- Durham, Oklahoma
- Durham, Oregon
- Durham, Pennsylvania

=== Electoral districts ===
- Durham (electoral district), House of Commons of Canada (since 1903)
- Durham (provincial electoral district), Legislative Assembly of Ontario, Canada (since 1926)
- Durham (Province of Canada electoral district) (1841–1867)
- Electoral district of Durham, New South Wales Legislative Assembly, Australia (1856–1920)
- Electoral district of County of Durham, New South Wales Legislative Council, Australia (1843–1856)
- City of Durham (UK Parliament constituency) (since 1678)
- County Durham (UK Parliament constituency) (1675–1832)

== Ships ==
- Durham (1814 ship), a ship launched in France
- USS Durham (LKA-114), a Charleston-class amphibious cargo ship of the United States Navy

== Other uses ==
- Durham (poem), an Old English poem
- Durham (surname)
- Bishop of Durham, an Anglican bishop office
- Earl of Durham, a British title from 1833 to present
- Durham Cathedral
- Durham County Cricket Club
- Durham Fair, an agricultural fair in Connecticut
- Durham Museum, Durham a museum in Durham, England
- Durham Museum, Omaha, Nebraska a museum in Omaha, Nebraska
- Durham rule, a way that has been used to frame the insanity defense in the US
- Durham University, a university in Durham, England
- Durham W.F.C., a women's football club based in Durham, England
- Fort Durham, an archaeological site near Taku Harbor, Alaska

== People with the given name ==
- Durham Glaster, a character in the Black Cat manga series

== See also ==
- Durham Academy (disambiguation)
- Durham City (disambiguation)
- Durham County (disambiguation)
- Durham station (disambiguation)
- Durham Report on Canada, 1839
- Durham special counsel investigation
- Durham Township (disambiguation)
- Durhamville (disambiguation)
- Durum, a species of wheat
- Justice Durham (disambiguation)
- New Durham (disambiguation)
