= Dublin (disambiguation) =

Dublin is the capital city of the Republic of Ireland.

Dublin may also refer to:

== Places ==
=== Ireland ===
- Dublin Airport, the international airport serving Dublin city
- Dublin Bay
- County Dublin, one of the 32 traditional counties of Ireland, and a NUTS Level III region of Ireland
- South Dublin, a county within the traditional County Dublin
- Dublin County (Dáil constituency), a former constituency which sent deputies forward to Dáil Éireann
- County Dublin (UK Parliament constituency), a former constituency which sent deputies forward to the parliament of the United Kingdom
- Dublin City (Parliament of Ireland constituency)
- County Dublin (Parliament of Ireland constituency)
- Dublin University (Parliament of Ireland constituency)
- Dublin (European Parliament constituency)
- Dublin (barony), a barony in Ireland

=== United States ===
- Dublin, Alabama, an unincorporated community
- Dublin, California
- Dublin, Florida
- Dublin, Georgia
- Dublin, Indiana
- Dublin, Kentucky
- Dublin, Maryland
- Dublin, Missouri
- Dublin, New Hampshire
- Dublin, Paterson, New Jersey, a neighborhood
- Dublin, North Carolina
- Dublin, Ohio
- Dublin, Pennsylvania
- Dublin, Texas
- Dublin, Virginia
- Dublin Township (disambiguation)

=== Other places ===
- Dublin, Banana Islands, Sierra Leone
- Dublin, Belarus
- Dublin, Ontario, Canada
- Dublin, South Australia, Australia
- Dublin, Suffolk, a location in England
- York, Toronto, Canada, surveyed in 1791 as Dublin

== People ==
- Dublin (surname)
- Marquess of Dublin, Robert de Vere, 9th Earl of Oxford

== Transportation ==
- HMS Dublin, any of several ships of war
- Dublin Metro, a light rail transport system
- Dublin (1784 EIC ship)

== Other uses ==
- Dublin Regulation, the asylum accord of the European Union
- Dublin Accord, an agreement for the international recognition of Engineering Technician qualifications
- Dublin Core, a metadata standard
- Dublin GAA, representative teams in Gaelic games
- Dublin Philharmonic Orchestra, an orchestra

== See also ==
- Dublin City (disambiguation)
- Dublin High School (disambiguation)
