= Durham (surname) =

Durham is a surname. Notable people with the surname include:

== A ==
- Adrian Durham, English football journalist and broadcaster

== B ==
- Bartlett S. Durham (1824–1859), American physician and the namesake of Durham, North Carolina

== C ==
- Caden Durham (born 2006), American football player
- Carl T. Durham (1892–1974) North Carolina politician
- Chuck Durham (1918-2008), Philanthropist and civil engineer

== D ==
- David Anthony Durham (born 1969), American novelist
- Darius Durham (born 1961), American football player

== E ==
- Edward B. Durham (c. 1870 – c. 1930), American mining engineer and professor

== F ==
- Florence Margaret Durham (1869–1949), British geneticist

== G ==
- Geoffrey Durham (born 1949), British comedy magician and actor

== H ==
- Hugh Durham (born 1937), American college basketball coach

== J ==
- Jim Durham (1947–2012), American sportscaster
- Jimmie Durham (1940–2021), American sculptor and poet
- John Durham (born 1950), American federal prosecutor
- John Durham (Medal of Honor) (1843–1918), American Civil War soldier and Medal of Honor recipient
- John Durham (MP) (died 1420), for Middlesex (UK Parliament constituency)
- John S. Durham (ambassador) (1861–1919), American diplomat
- Judith Durham (1943–2022), Australian singer, member of The Seekers

== L ==
- Leon Durham (born 1957), American baseball player

== M ==
- Martin Durham (1951–2022), British political scientist
- Michael Durham Scottish courtier and physician
- Marilyn Durham, author

== N ==
- Nancy Durham (born c. 1952), Canadian journalist

== P ==
- Payne Durham (born 2000), American football player
- Philip Charles Durham (1763–1845), British admiral who fought at the Battle of Trafalgar

== R ==
- Ray Durham (born 1971), American baseball player
- Richard Durham (1917-1984), writer and radio producer
- Rhea Durham (born 1978), American fashion model
- Ron Durham (1921–2021), Australian rules footballer
- Ronnia Durham-Balcombe, Saint Vincent and the Grenadines politician

== S ==
- Susan Durham, neurosurgeon

== T ==
- Tim Durham (born 1962), businessman and fraudster

== W ==
- Walter T. Durham (1924–2013), American historian
- Woody Durham (1941–2018), American radio announcer
