= Frederick Gilberts King =

Canadian mining engineer (1866–1920)

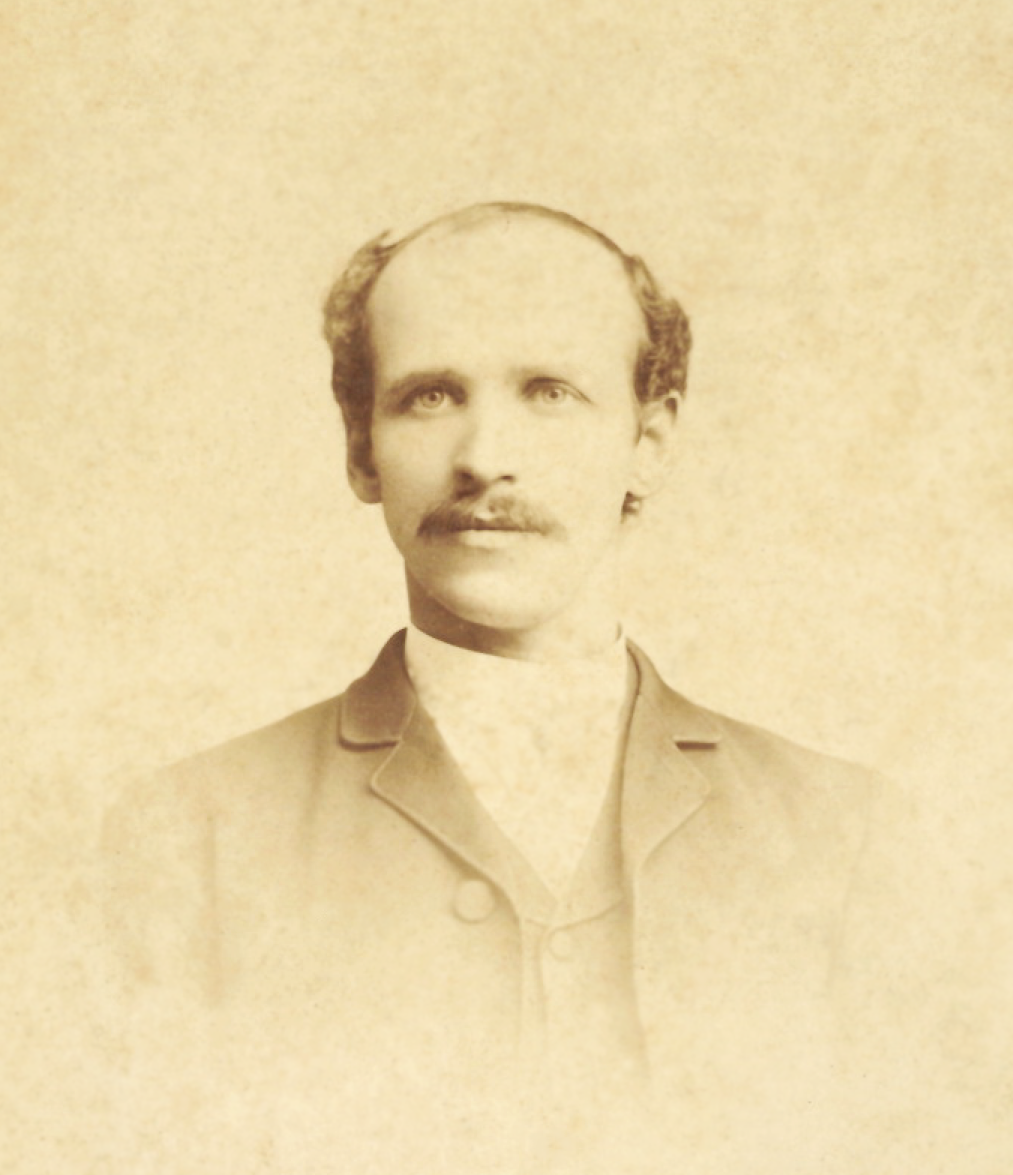
- Frederick Gilberts King Jr. as a young man, from a picture dated about 1892.
- Born: March 12, 1866; Aylesford, Nova Scotia, Canada
- Died: December 11, 1920 (aged 54)
- Education: Cramlington Colliery (Northumberland, England)
- Occupations: Mining Engineer, Oil & Mining Entrepreneur
- Organization(s): Member of The North of England Institute of Mining and Mechanical Engineers and The American Institute of Mining Engineers
- Known for: Founding of the Boston Pacific Oil Company
- Spouse: Hazel Hope Hubbard
- Children: 2

Frederick Gilberts King (1866–1920) was a mining engineer and a pioneer in California's burgeoning oil, copper and natural gas industries during the late-19th and early 20th centuries. King was considered "one of the best-known oil men in the west" at the time. He was known for founding the Boston Pacific Oil Company (based in San Francisco, California).

== Mines, oil wells & the founding of the Boston Pacific Oil Company ==
Born March 12, 1866, in Ayelsford, Nova Scotia, Canada, to Frederick Gilberts King Sr. and Julia Ann Miller, King studied mining engineering at Cramlington Colliery in Northumberland, England (approximately nine miles north of Newcastle). He was elected to The North of England Institute of Mining and Mechanical Engineers on 8 October 1892.

By 1892–93, Frederick traveled to the United States, settling in San Francisco, California, where, by the late nineteenth into the early twentieth centuries, California had become the largest oil-producing state in the country. Frederick, representing eastern interests, explored and inspected mines in Shasta County, California. He made his first major purchase in November 1899, which consisted of a deed to the Reid Mine, in Star Gulch (Shasta Co., CA). By its terms, "Frederick G. King and C. D. Galvin, a 'mining man' interested in Shasta county properties, secured a six months' option on the mine for $100,000" ($3 million in 2016). Three installments were agreed to for the payment of the purchase price. The Reid mine was owed by E.A. Reid, John Salnave and W.H. Clendenin of San Francisco. BPOC's intention was to put-in drills and other machinery for developing the mine and of constructions a tramway to the Keswick smelter, where the ore would be worked.

In 1904, King facilitated one of his more high-profile mining acquisitions: the purchase of the then-famous Mammoth copper mine, located in Kennett, Shasta Co., California. Originally owned by Desda Wallace of San Francisco, Wallace's 1/3 share (consisting of 900 acres) was sold to King and John Fillius for $42,000 ($1 million in 2016) in 1904. The remaining 2/3s share remained in the hands of R.M. Saeltzer, Joseph Kahny and Tony Jaegel of Redding, California. King, however, retained a bond to work the entire mine. At the same time, the Guggenheims of New York were negotiating for the purchase of the Mammoth mine.

In 1909, King (with John Filius and Fred Grotefend) purchased the largest salt mine on earth located in Death Valley, California.

In 1910, King's Pacific Sunset Oil Company, which he renamed and incorporated the Boston Pacific Oil Company in March 2010 (see below), brought a suit before United States circuit court on 23 December for an injunction to restrain Charles W. Gregg of Colorado, U.S. Waugh, W. Newburg, Morris Newberger, F.A. Cromwell, C.M. Webb, Adeline Webb, U.E. Methaver, and several other of Gregg's associates living in California from disposing of 200,000 shares of the oil company's stock, valued at $1 a share at the time, which, it was alleged, was secured by the defendants through "trickery and fraud." Gregg and the other defendants held 200,000 shares of the 219,965 shares of the issued capital stock of the Pacific Sunset oil company. It is said that in order to trade off the 200,000 shares of the Pacific Sunset stock for an equal amount in the Boston Pacific company, Gregg and the other defendants, among other things, filled an oil reservoir on the Pacific Sunset oil company's fifty acres of leased land in Kern county, which contained 3,400 barrels of oil, with water so as to make it appear that the reservoir held between 25,000 and 30,000 barrels of oil. When negotiations began, Gregg and his associates asserted there were four wells on the property each of which was producing 70 barrels of oil per day; and that the total liabilities of the Pacific Sunset Oil Company, which it was proposed that BPOC should take over, did not exceed $10,000; that the sump contained between 25,000 and 30,000 barrels of oil and that the company had an option to purchase the leased land for $80,000 ($2 million in 2016). The complaint stated that each of the four wells produced only 17 to 20 barrels of actual oil the day of the investigation when inspected by a representative of Fillius, and that the wells had not been worked for some period previous to the time they were inspected, so that the 70 barrels pumped "the day of" the investigation was actually the accumulation of several days of pumping; that the sump contained only 3,600 barrels of oil, not 25,000-30,000 (the remainder of the fluid in the reserves being water poured in by the defendants); and that the company held no option to purchase the land they had leased for $80,000. The complaint also indicated that the liabilities of the Pacific Sun Oil Company amounted to $23,304. Another charge contained in the complaint was the Gregg said the Pacific Sunset company had an agreement with the Independent Oil Producers' agency whereby the latter agreed to take all the oil the former should sell at $0.55 ($13.50 in 2016) a barrel, whereas no such agreement existed.

Founded as the Pacific Sunset Oil Company (charter forfeited in 1911), King, his brother Charles Tupper King, John Fillius, C. W. Gugg, A. B. Dodd, Fred Grotefund and E. D. King, as directors, renamed and formally incorporated the new Boston Pacific Oil Company (BPOC) on 12 March 1910 in San Francisco, California, with capital stock valued at $1 million ($28 million in 2022). Frederick's brother, Charles Tupper King, also served as the company's attorney.

In 1913, King became a member of the American Institute of Mining Engineers.

== Death ==
Frederick died from a heart attack (cause of death on birth certificate given as "Myocarditis") on a train en route to Berkeley on 11 December 1920. He was 54 years old. By the time of his death, he had amassed a fortune worth over $300,000 ($4.6 million in 2022). The following is a news article from the Oakland Tribune describing Frederick's final moments:

"Berkeley Man Dies on Train"

BERKELEY, Dec. 11—Stricken with heart failure as he was returning to his home at 1731 La Loma Avenue, Berkeley, Frederick Gilbert King, president of the Boston Pacific Oil Company, died on a Southern Pacific train today en route from Taft, Kern county, where he had gone on business. King complained of feeling ill as the train neared Byron, Contra Costa county. Dr. E.R. McPheeters of Modesto, a passenger on the train was summoned, but King had passed away before he could aid him. The body was brought to Berkeley where relatives were notified. As president and general manager of the Boston Pacific Oil Company, King was one of the best known oil men in the west. He was a former mining engineer, but of late had devoted himself to the oil industry. For the last six years he had made his home in Berkeley, and previous to that time resided in San Francisco, coming from the east, where he was engaged in mining activities. He was a member of the Family and Olympic clubs in San Francisco. King is survived by a widow, Mrs. Hazel King, and two children, Frederick Gilbert King Jr., aged 5, and Elizabeth Hubbard King, 2. Funeral services will be conducted at 2 o'clock Monday afternoon at local undertaking parlors."

== Lawsuit vacated ==
Four years following Frederick's death, a verdict in favor for Saide E. Pritchard (of Denver, Colorado) against King's wife, Hazel, and the King estate, for $20,458 ($350,000 in 2022), was vacated by Judge F. H. Rudkin in 1924. The original award of $20,458 in favor of Pritchard returned by a jury in the United States district court against King's estate was set aside because, in Judge Rudkin's opinion, said "the verdict was not supported by the evidence." Sadie Pritchard based her suit on $35,000 ($600,000 in 2022) she invested with King, intended for various mining ventures, while living in Denver, Colorado in 1892, and the evidence showed to be the nucleus of a $300,000 fortune ($4.6 million in 2022) King accumulated before his death. Pritchard sued on the ground that King never made a settlement with her, although evidence showed he intended to. She alleged that she was entitled to receive half of all profits which accrued; and profits from the ventures reached the total of about $750,000 ($12.8 million in 20122, but she said she only received $14,000 ($240,000 in 2022) before Frederick's death in 1920.

== Family ==
Fredrick Gilberts King Jr. (b. 12 March 1866, Nova Scotia, Canada) was the son of Frederick Gilberts King Sr., m. 1 September 1855 in Aylesford, Nova Scotia to Julia Ann Miller (b. 29 April 1832, dau. William Miller, Esq., Justice of the Peace, Aylesford, Nova Scotia and Susannah Caroline Slocombe). Frederick had one brother, Charles Tupper King (b. 1862; m. Ethel Durant), named after The Right Hon. Sir Charles Tupper, 1st Baronet and 6th Prime Minister of Canada (who was Charles' aunt's stepson, through her marriage to the Rev. Charles Tupper). Frederick also had two sisters: Mary Isabel King (b. 1864, m. Arthur Frederick Lawrance) and Minnie King (b. 1858). On his mother's maternal line, he is third cousin to Capt. Joshua Slocum, the first person to sail solo around the world and author of Sailing Alone Around the World.

Frederick King married Hazel Hope Hubbard on 12 August 1914 in Berkeley, California and had one daughter and one son:

1. Frederick Gilberts King III (b. 24 June 1915)
2. Elizabeth Hubbard King (b. 14 January 1917)

== Ancestry ==
Frederick G. King descends from, on his maternal line, Thomas Wiswall (1601–1683), who was an early settler of British America, a prominent early citizen of the Massachusetts Bay Colony and a key figure in the founding of Cambridge Village (now known as the city of Newton, Massachusetts); John Oliver (1616–1646), one of the earliest graduates of Harvard College (1645); and Mayflower passengers William Mullins, John Alden and Priscilla Alden.
