= Dubin (surname) =

Dubin (Cyrillic: Дубин) is a surname. In Slavic languages it originated from the noun dub (oak), which characterized stubborn and strong men, and its feminine counterpart is Dubinina. The surname may refer to the following notable people:

- Abdulla Dubin (born 1941), Tatar television and radio newsreader
- Al Dubin (1891–1945), American lyricist
- Alan Dubin, American singer, vocalist of Khanate
- Boris Dubin (1946–2014), Russian sociologist
- Charles S. Dubin (1919–2011), American film and television director
- Ellen Dubin, Canadian actress
- Eva Andersson-Dubin (born 1961), Swedish physician
- Gary Dubin (1959–2016), American actor and voice actor
- Glenn Dubin (born 1957), American hedge fund manager, former Principal of Dubin & Co. LP
- Isadore Dubin, Canadian pathologist
  - Dubin–Johnson syndrome, an autosomal disorder named after Isadore
- Jane Dubin, American producer of Broadway plays
- Jeanne Evert Dubin (Jeanne Evert (1957–2020), American professional tennis player
- Joseph Dubin (1900–1961), American composer and orchestrator
- Louis Dubin (born 1963), American real estate developer
- Mordehai Dubin (1889–1956), Jewish spiritual and political leader in Latvia
- Richard Dubin, American professor at Syracuse University
- Shawn Dubin (born 1995), American professional baseball pitcher
- Wolfgang Dubin, paralympic athlete from Austria

== See also ==
- Dublin (disambiguation)
