= John Durham (disambiguation) =

John Durham may refer to:

- John Durham (born 1950), American federal prosecutor
- John Durham (Medal of Honor) (1843–1918), American Civil War soldier and Medal of Honor recipient
- John Durham (MP) (died 1420), for Middlesex (UK Parliament constituency)
- John S. Durham (ambassador) (1861–1919), American diplomat
