= John S. Durham =

John S. Durham may refer to:

- John Durham (Medal of Honor) (John Stafford Durham, 1843–1918), American Civil War recipient of the Medal of Honor
- John S. Durham (ambassador), African-American journalist and diplomat
