= Storm Water Solutions =

- Type: Monthly
- Format: Paper and online magazine
- Owner: Scranton Gillette Communications
- Editor: Bill Wilson, Lauren Baltas, Lauren Estes
- Founded: 2005
- Language: English
- Headquarters: 3030 W. Salt Creek Lane, Suite 201; Arlington Heights, Illinois 60005-5025, United States
- Circulation: Bill Wilson, Lauren Baltas, Lauren Estes
- Website: Storm Water Solutions

Storm Water Solutions (SWS) magazine, a supplement of Roads & Bridges and Water & Wastes Digest, is a magazine that was created by Scranton Gillette Communications, Inc. in 2005.

SWS reaches than 70,000 industry professionals across print and digital publication.

== Article content ==
The magazine provides industry news, as well as information on industry technologies and case studies. Subscribers include engineers, contractors, government officials and other professionals who seek timely information regarding storm water management, green infrastructure, wetland restoration, watershed planning, combined sewer overflows, erosion control, hydroseeding and more.

== Awards ==
SWS was a 2017 ASBPE (American Society of Business Publication Editors) Awards of Excellence Upper Midwest Regional Bronze Winner for e-Newsletter General Excellence. SWS annually presents Top Project Awards to noteworthy projects in the storm water and erosion control industries.
