= Robert Peel (disambiguation) =

Robert Peel (1788–1850) was twice prime minister of the United Kingdom.

Robert Peel or Peele may also refer to:

- Robert Francis Peel (1874–1924), governor of Saint Helena
- Robert Peel (historian) (1909–1992), American author of first scholarly biography of Mary Baker Eddy
- Robert Peel (doctor) (c. 1830–1894), medical practitioner in South Australia
- Robert Peel (judge) (born 1966), British High Court judge
- Robert Peel Dawson (1818–1877), Irish member of parliament
- Parsley Peel (Robert Peel, 1723–1795), English industrialist
- Sir Robert Peel, 1st Baronet (1750–1830), English politician and industrialist
- Sir Robert Peel, 3rd Baronet (1822–1895), British politician
- Robert Peel (hotelier), founder of Peel Hotels
- Bobby Peel (1857–1941), Yorkshire and England cricketer
- Robert Peele (engineer) (1858–1942), American mining engineer

== Other uses ==
- Robert Peel Inlet, Nunavut, Canada
- Sir Robert Peel (racehorse), racehorse that won the first Irish Grand National in 1870
