= Edward B. Durham =

American mining engineer

Edward Benjamin Durham (c. 1870s – c. 1930s) was an American mining engineer and Professor at Columbia University and the University of California, Berkeley, especially known for his work on mine surveying.

== Biography ==
Durham received his MA in mining at the Columbia University in 1893, where he was classmate of Halbert Powers Gillette.

Durham started his career as Assistant Mining engineer in 1893. In 1901 back at Columbia University he started lecturing mining, and was eventually promoted to Professor. He had become a member of the American Institute of Mining Engineers. In 1910 he was also appointed Associate Professor of Mining at the University of California, Berkeley, where he delivered a new special course in surface and underground surveying of mines. In the early 1910s he moved to Berkeley, California.

In 1916 Durham joined the engineering staff of the Mammoth Copper Mining Co., Kennett, California, where he became engaged in the design and erection of an aerial tramway at the Stowell Mine, near Kennett. In 1918 he published one of his latest known articles on "Aerial tramways and cableways" in the Mining Engineers' Handbook.

== Work ==
=== Flow sheets, 1910 ===
In 1910 Durham published the article, entitled "Flow Sheets" in The California Journal of Technology', which is one of the first academic articles on flow charts. Durham explained:

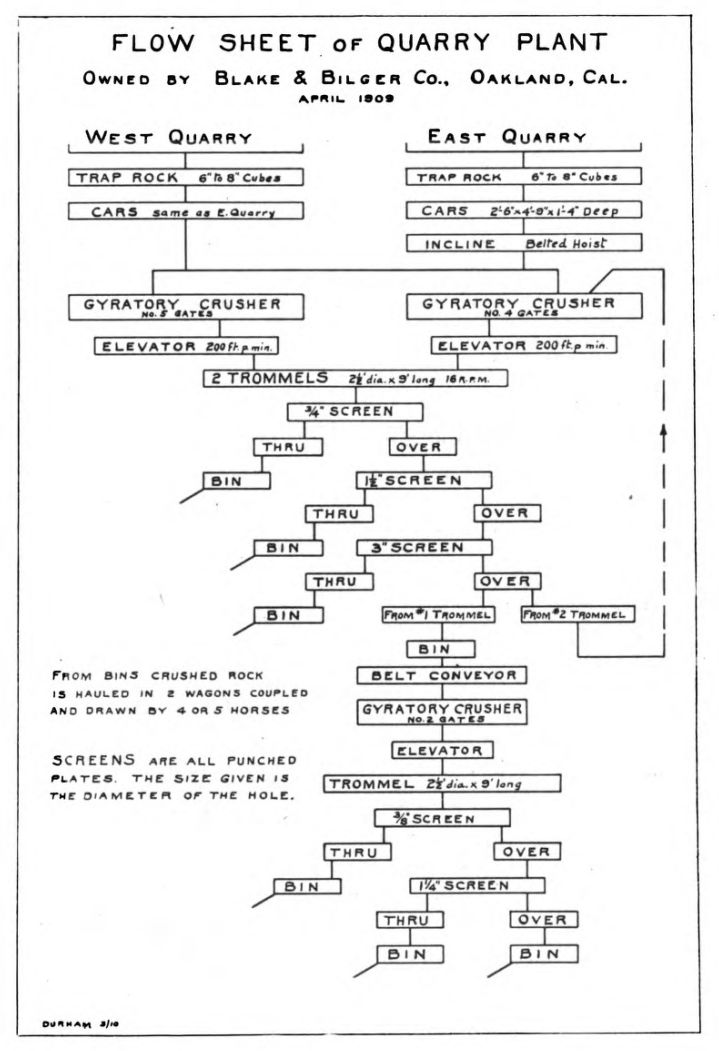
Flow Sheet of Quarry Plant, 1910

One of the most useful methods of describing the various steps in an operation is by means of “flow sheets.” These took their name from ore-concentrating processes, where they have been long used to describe the flow of ore, or of water through the mills. They closely resemble the old-fashioned family trees, where the relation of the different members to each other were shown, and flow sheets might well be called "process trees."

The principle of flow sheets is of wide application; in business, it can be used to show the organization of the staff and to whom each is responsible; in manufacturing, the passage of the material through the works, from department to department, and even the steps in each department, can be shown; in milling or metallurgical operations, the passage of the material from process to process and the resulting products and their disposal can be shown; in power distribution, the heat generated by coal under the boilers can be followed in its change to mechanical power and its application to various machines.

Flow sheets are useful to give a picture of a technical operation, or process to a non-technical person, and, for such purposes, may be very simple, and details and minor parts of the operation may be omitted. To the engineer, flow sheets are of great value. first, in studying the operation of a plant; second, in describing a process briefly, yet completely, and third, In designing.

In this description Durham talks about features of, what we now know as, both the organizational chart and of the flow chart. Yet, this article might be one of the first articles solely devoted to the flow chart.

=== Mine surveying, 1913 ===
A 1913 review in the Book Review Digest summarized that the "author assumes on the part of the reader of this book a general knowledge of surveying. and after a brief summary of the subject in the first chapter, he takes up in turn, equipment for underground surveying, underground traversing, calculations and mapping, special problems and instruments, shaft plumbing, tunnel surveys, exploratory surveys, magnetic surveys."

The reviewer judged that "Prof. Durham has gathered together a large amount of valuable information. The reviewer has not seen any book which surpasses it in the treatment of the subject, or in general arrangement, clearness and brevity of statement. If it could be made slightly smaller, without affecting the size of the type or affecting the ease with which it can be read, it would doubtless be appreciated by those for whose use it is intended."

Beside a section on mine-surveying instruments it also included a section on the history of mining surveying. In his days the book was quite popular.

== Selected publications ==
- Edward Benjamin Durham, Mine surveying, McGraw-Hill Book Company, inc. 1913

Articles, a selection:

- Edward B. Durham, "Flow Sheets," in: The California Journal of Technology. Vol. XVii, March 1910, No. 3.
- Durham, E. B., "Filing Technical Literature," Engin. Min. Jour., April 29, 1916.
- Hewitt, William, and Edward B. Durham. "Discussion of" A Simple Method of Computing Deflections of a Cable Span Carrying Multiple Loads Evenly Spaced"." "Transactions of the American Society of Civil Engineers" 83.1, 1921: 1399–1404.
- Durham, E. B. "Aerial tramways and cableways," in: Mining Engineers' Handbook, by Robert Peele, 1918; 2d ed., 1927. Vol. 2, Sec. 28, p. 1745-1802.
