= Master of Pharmacy =

Academic degree

The Master of Pharmacy (MPharm) can be awarded as a traditional postgraduate degree upon completing postgraduate coursework. However, in the UK, it is structured as a four-year integrated undergraduate master's program—though both pathways serve as the professional equivalent to a standard Bachelor of Pharmacy (BPharm) for entry into practice.

== Australia ==
In 2004, the University of Newcastle introduced a two-year postgraduate MPharm coursework program as an alternative pathway for graduates with a bachelor's degree in any science or medical science that meets the required prerequisites to qualify for registration as pharmacists. The MPharm degree serves as an entry-level qualification rather than an advanced degree for practicing pharmacists. Following the launch of the MPharm program at the University of Newcastle, other universities across Australia also began offering similar coursework programs. Currently, both the BPharm and MPharm degrees are accepted for registration as practicing pharmacists.

Refer to the list of pharmacy schools in Australia for institutions offering the MPharm degree.

== Finland ==
In Finland, "proviisori" is an academic degree awarded upon completion of the postgraduate program in pharmacy, equivalent to the English term "Master of Pharmacy". Holding a "proviisori" degree is a professional prerequisite for pharmacists. Pharmacy education in Finland is offered at the University of Helsinki and the University of Eastern Finland.

== Israel ==
Starting in 2017, the Ben Gurion University of the Negev initiated a 2-year Master's program in Community Clinical Pharmacy and Regulatory Management. This program is open to Bachelor of Pharmacy graduates who are registered pharmacists in the country, with a minimum of 2 years of work experience.

== Malta ==
The Department of Pharmacy at the University of Malta, within the Faculty of Medicine & Surgery, provides a Master of Pharmacy (M.Pharm.) course designed for students who have completed the Bachelor of Science (Hons.) in Pharmaceutical Science. The MPharm degree is mandatory for acquiring the warrant to practice as a Pharmacist in Malta.

== Poland ==
In Poland, magister farmacji (abbreviated to mgr farmacji) is an academic degree conferred after five years of academic study (including 2 1-month training placements in open and hospital pharmacies during summer vacations), completion of a dissertation and 6-months training placement in open pharmacy being a prerequisite. This degree is equivalent to the American Pharm.D.

== Ukraine ==
- National University of Pharmacy - Kharkiv
- Ternopil State Medical University - Ternopil
- Danylo Halytsky Lviv National Medical University - Lviv
- Kharkiv Medical Academy of Post-graduate Education - Kharkiv
- Kyiv Medical University of UAFM - Kyiv

== United Kingdom ==
In the United Kingdom, MPharm is a standard undergraduate academic degree in pharmacy, awarded after four years of academic study. This degree replaced the BSc (Pharmacy) or BPharm degree when pharmacy education was extended from three to four years in 1997. The change was introduced partly to align with European pharmacy training requirements and partly to broaden the scope and depth of undergraduate pharmacy education.

The MPharm is the sole qualification in the UK leading to professional registration as a pharmacist. MPharm programs are accredited by the General Pharmaceutical Council (GPhC) in England, Scotland, and Wales, and by the Pharmaceutical Society of Northern Ireland (PSNI) in Northern Ireland. Aspiring pharmacists in the UK qualify by first completing this degree, then undertaking a year of foundation pharmacist training. Upon successful completion of this training and after passing the registration assessment, they become registered pharmacists. Until September 2010, in Great Britain, registration with the GPhC automatically made pharmacists members of the Royal Pharmaceutical Society of Great Britain, allowing them to use the postnominal letters MRPharmS (Member of the Royal Pharmaceutical Society of Great Britain). However, in September 2010, the RPS separated its regulatory role, and the new regulatory body, the GPhC, no longer grants post-nominals to its registrants. MRPharmS is still awarded by the RPS to its members, but it is no longer directly linked to current registration as a pharmacist. In Northern Ireland, regulation remains under the PSNI, so registration as a pharmacist and membership of the PSNI still occur simultaneously, allowing the use of the post-nominals MPSNI (Member of the Pharmaceutical Society of Northern Ireland).

=== England ===
- Aston University – Birmingham
- University of Bath – Bath
- University of Birmingham – Birmingham
- University of Bradford – Bradford
- University of Brighton – Brighton
- University of Central Lancashire – Preston
- De Montfort University – Leicester
- University of Durham – Durham (transferring to Newcastle University in September 2017)
- University of East Anglia – Norwich
- University of Huddersfield – Huddersfield
- Keele University – Keele
- King's College London - Waterloo, London
- Kingston University - Kingston upon Thames, London (Co-taught at St George's, University of London.)
- Medway School of Pharmacy – University of Greenwich/University of Kent
- University College London - Bloomsbury, London (previously School of Pharmacy, University of London)
- Liverpool John Moores University – Liverpool
- University of Hertfordshire – Hatfield
- University of Lincoln - Lincolnshire
- University of Manchester – Manchester
- University of Nottingham – Nottingham
- University of Portsmouth – Portsmouth
- University of Reading – Reading
- University of Sussex – Sussex
- University of Sunderland – Sunderland
- University of Wolverhampton – Wolverhampton

=== Northern Ireland ===
- Queen's University Belfast (QUB) – Belfast
- University of Ulster (UU) - Coleraine

=== Scotland ===
- University of Strathclyde – Glasgow
- Robert Gordon University – Aberdeen

=== Wales ===
- Cardiff University (Cardiff School of Pharmacy and Pharmaceutical Sciences) – Cardiff

== Ireland ==
In Ireland, the MPharm is awarded after five years: the first four years are undergraduate study leading to a BSc.Pharm which includes a two week placement in second year in a community pharmacy setting and a four month placement in fourth year which may be in any area of pharmacy (community, hospital, industry, regulation, etc.). The fifth and final year is the one-year master's degree (MPharm) which includes an eight-month placement in a patient-facing area of pharmacy (community or hospital).

=== Universities ===
- University College Cork - Cork City, Co. Cork,
- Royal College of Surgeons in Ireland - Dublin City, Co. Dublin,
- Trinity College, Dublin - Dublin City, Co. Dublin,
- Atlantic Technological University, Sligo (Formerly IT Sligo) - Sligo, Co. Sligo,
- University of Galway - Galway City, Co. Galway,
- South East Technological University, Waterford (Formerly Waterford IT) - Waterford City, Co. Waterford.

== India ==
Master of Pharmacy (MPharma) in India is offered as a postgraduate (graduate) course following completion of a BPharma degree. The MPharma course typically spans two years. In certain universities, it comprises one year of research and one year of theory examination, while others provide MPharm solely through research, culminating in a doctoral degree. The program emphasizes specialization within the field of pharmacy. MPharma courses are conducted by pharmacy colleges affiliated with universities, enabling entry into the pharmacy profession.

=== MPharm (Clinical)/MClinPharm ===
With the success and popularity of MPharm coursework degrees, research MPharm degrees have now been re-designated as Master of Pharmacy (Clinical) (abbreviated MPharm (Clinical)) or Master of Clinical Pharmacy (abbreviated MClinPharm). This degree provides advanced training for Bachelor of Pharmacy graduates but does not alone fulfill the requirements for pharmacist registration. The following colleges in India offer MPharma programs in various specialties such as Industrial Pharmacy, Bulk Drugs, Pharmacology, Pharmaceutics, Pharmacognosy, Pharmaceutical Biotechnology, etc.:

- MIT World Peace University School Of Pharmacy, Pune
- Nalanda college of Pharmacy, Nalgonda
- Gyani Inder Singh Institute of Professional Studies, Dehradun
- J.S.S College of Pharmacy, Mysore/ Ootty
- Pad. Dr. D. Y. Patil Institute of Pharmaceutical Science and Research, Pimpri, Pune, Maharashtra, India
- Department of Pharmaceutical Sciences, Guru Nanak Dev University(GNDU), Amritsar, Punjab
- Hindu College of Pharmacy, sonepat, Haryana.
- Dr. Hari Singh Gour University, Sagar, Madhya Pradesh
- Suresh Gyan Vihar University, Jaipur, Rajasthan
- Alwar Pharmacy college, Alwar, Rajasthan
- Sri Jayadev College of Pharmaceutical Sciences, Naharkanta, Bhubaneswar.
- Bombay College of Pharmacy, Mumbai, Maharashtra
- Banaras Hindu University (BHU ), Varanasi, Uttar Pradesh
- Delhi Institute of Pharmaceutical Sciences and Research (DIPSAR), New Delhi
- ISF College of Pharmacy, Moga, Punjab
- Manipal University, Bangalore, Karanataka
- Madras Medical College, Chennai, Tamil Nadu
- NIPERs at Mohali, Hajipur, Rae baraeli, Hyderabad etc.
- Jamia Hamdard University, Delhi
- Mahakal institute of pharmaceutical studies, Ujjain
- Department of Pharmaceutical sciences and drug research Punjabi University Patiala
- Shri Guru Ram Rai institute of technology and science Dehradun(Uttarakhand Technical University, Dehradun)
- Department of Pharmacology, KIET School of Pharmacy, Ghaziabad 201 206 www.kiet.edu
- Department of Pharmacology, KIET, Ghaziabad, NCR Delhi
- NSHM College of Pharmaceutical Technology, Kolkata, West Bengal
- Himalayan Pharmacy Institute, Majhitar, East Sikkim
- University Department of Pharmaceutical Science, Utkal University, Bhubaneswar, Odisha

== Bangladesh ==
In Bangladesh, A total of 31 universities offers BPharm and MPharm degree including the University of Dhaka, University of Chittagong, University of Rajshahi, Jahangirnagar UniversityUniversity of Development Alternative, Khulna University Jagannath University, State University of Bangladesh, University of Science and Technology Chittagong, Brac University, North South University

== Pakistan ==
The postgraduate MPhil program is offered in Pakistan in four disciplines: pharmaceutics, pharmaceutical chemistry, pharmacology, and pharmacognosy. Some universities have also introduced a new discipline, pharmacy practice.

== Kenya ==
In Kenya, the School of Pharmacy at the University of Nairobi offers three Master of Pharmacy degrees:

- Master of Pharmacy in Pharmacoepidemiology & Pharmacovigilance.
- Master of Pharmacy in Clinical Pharmacy (M.Pharm. Clin.Pharm) offered by the Department of Pharmaceutics and Pharmacy Practice
- Master of Pharmacy in Industrial Pharmacy (M.Pharm. Ind.Pharm) offered by the Department of Pharmaceutics and Pharmacy Practice

These are 2-year Master's degree programs with both taught and research components.

== See also ==
- Bachelor of Pharmacy
- Doctor of Pharmacy
- Pharmacist
- Pharmaconomist
- Pharmacy
