= Diagnostic and Interventional Cardiology =

- Type: business magazine
- Format: Paper and online magazine
- Owner(s): Scranton Gillette Communications
- Founded: 1961
- Language: English
- Headquarters: Arlington Heights, Illinois, USA
- Circulation: 26, 242
- ISSN: 1551-6091
- Website: Diagnostic and Interventional Cardiology

Diagnostic and Interventional Cardiology is a trade magazine catering to cardiologists and cath labs.

== History and profile ==
Diagnostic and Interventional Cardiology was launched by Chilton Publishing in Philadelphia in 1961. In 1975 it was sold to Reilly Communications Group. The magazine is owned by Scranton Gillette Communications. Its focus is on interventional cardiology, a branch of cardiology that uses catheter-based treatment to deal with structural heart disease. The magazine provides information about developments in this field and is a notable publication within the healthcare industry. The magazine was the recipient of American Society of Healthcare Publication Editors award in 2013.

The magazine had 26,242 subscribers to its print edition in July 2013. Melinda Taschetta-Millane is its editorial director.
