= Durham School (disambiguation) =

Durham School may refer to:

in England

- Durham School, an independent British day and boarding school for girls and boys (age 3-18) in Durham.

in the United States

(by state)

- Durham School (Durham, Arkansas), listed on the NRHP in Arkansas
- Durham School of the Arts, in Durham, North Carolina
- Durham Public Schools, the public school system of Durham, North Carolina
- Thomas Durham School, Philadelphia, PA, listed on the NRHP in Pennsylvania
- Durham's Chapel School, Bethpage, TN, listed on the NRHP in Tennessee

== See also ==
- Durham High School (disambiguation)
