= Durham Township =

Durham Township may refer to the following places in the United States:

- Durham Township, Washington County, Arkansas
- Durham Township, Hancock County, Illinois
- Durham Township, Durham County, North Carolina
- Durham Township, Bucks County, Pennsylvania

== See also ==
- Durham (disambiguation)
- Durham Park Township, Marion County, Kansas
- New Durham Township, LaPorte County, Indiana
