= Durham High School =

Durham High School may refer to:

- Durham High School (California) in Durham, California
- Durham High School (Kansas) in Durham, Kansas, merged with Hillsboro High School (Kansas) in 1960s
- Durham High School (North Carolina) in Durham, North Carolina
- Durham High School for Girls in Durham, England

== See also ==
- Durham School (disambiguation)
- Durham (disambiguation)
