= Durham station =

Durham station may refer to:

- Durham station (North Carolina), an Amtrak train station in Durham, North Carolina, USA
- Durham railway station, a railway station in Durham, England
- Durham–UNH station, an Amtrak station in Durham, New Hampshire, USA
- Durham Station, North Carolina, former name of the city of Durham, North Carolina

== See also ==
- Durham (disambiguation)
