= Durham County (TV series) =

Canadian crime drama TV series (2007-2010)

- Genre: Crime drama
- Created by: Laurie Finstad Knizhnik; Janis Lundman; Adrienne Mitchell
- Starring: Hugh Dillon; Hélène Joy; Sonya Salomaa; Laurence Leboeuf; Greyston Holt; Justin Louis; Patrick Labbé; Michelle Forbes; Michael Nardone
- Country of origin: Canada
- Original language: English
- No. of seasons: 3
- No. of episodes: 18

Production
- Running time: 45–57 minutes
- Production companies: Muse Entertainment; Back Alley Films

Original release
- Network: Movie Central; The Movie Network
- Release: May 7, 2007 – November 29, 2010

Durham County is a Canadian crime drama television series produced by Muse Entertainment and Back Alley Films. It stars Hugh Dillon as a homicide detective who finds that moving back home comes with trouble and danger. Dillon appeared in this series at the same time he appeared in an ongoing role in another series, Flashpoint.

== Premise ==
Dillon plays Mike Sweeney, a homicide detective from Toronto who moves his family to suburban Durham County (Note: To be accurate, "Durham County" is the name of an historic county in the Canadian province of Ontario that was dissolved in 1974 and generally replaced by the creation in the same year of the Regional Municipality of Durham, called Durham Region for short.) to start over after his partner was killed and his wife Audrey (Hélène Joy) was diagnosed with breast cancer. However, he soon discovers that his neighbour and childhood nemesis Ray Prager (Justin Louis) may be a serial killer.

== Airings ==
The series premiered on Movie Central and The Movie Network on May 7, 2007. After more than a year, the second season premiered on July 13, 2009. The third and final season debuted on October 25, 2010. The first season subsequently aired on Global in the 2007–2008 television season. In Canada, the first season was released on DVD on September 9, 2008, followed by the second season on July 27, 2010.

On September 7, 2009, the series began airing on Ion Television, which reaches more than 94 million US television households. The network secured all US television, digital media rights, Internet streaming and video-on-demand rights for the program. It is the first original series to air on the network since 2004.

== Cast and characters ==
=== Main ===
- Hugh Dillon as Mike Sweeney, a veteran homicide detective who quits his position after the murder of his professional partner, and relocates his family back to his hometown.
- Hélène Joy as Audrey Sweeney is the wife of Mike Sweeney, trying to cope with her recent diagnosis of breast cancer.
- Sonya Salomaa as Traci Prager (season 1)
- Laurence Leboeuf as Sadie Sweeney
- Greyston Holt as Ray Prager Jr., the self-conscious teenage son of Ray Prager Sr. He appears oblivious to his father's interests and is often silent about his personal aspirations.
- Justin Louis as Ray Prager (season 1)
- Patrick Labbé as Tom Bykovski (season 2; recurring season 1)
- Michelle Forbes as Penelope Verrity (season 2)
- Michael Nardone as Ivan Sujic (season 3)

=== Recurring ===
- Jean-Nicolas Verreault as Jayson Graves Big Guy (season 1)
- Kathleen Munroe as Nathalie Lacroix (season 1)
- Joel Keller as Jake Sharpe (seasons 1–2)
- Claudia Ferri as Roxy Calvert (seasons 1–2)
- Cicely Austin as Maddie Sweeney
- Michael Dopud as Glenn Stuckey (season 2)
- Romano Orzari as Ray Prager (season 2)
- Geordie Johnson as Jonathan Verrity (season 2)
- Alex Cardillo as Mark Verrity (season 2)
- Christine Ghawi as Elodie Belknap (season 2)
- Krista Bridges as Sabina Leung (season 3)
- Andreas Apergis as Miro Çercu (season 3)
- Bénédicte Décary as Eva Arcady (season 3)
- Shannon Kook-Chun as David Cho (season 3)
- Gord Rand as Dr. Campbell Chin
- Fayolle Jean as Joseph Louboutin (season 3)

=== Guest ===
- Danny Blanco Hall as Caleb (season 1)

== Episodes ==
=== Series overview ===
Season	Episodes	Originally released	
Season	Episodes	First released	Last released
1	6	May 7, 2007	June 11, 2007
2	6	July 13, 2009	August 17, 2009
3	6	October 25, 2010	November 29, 2010

=== Season 1 (2007) ===
No. overall	No. in season	Title	Directed by	Written by	Original release date	Prod. code
1	1	"What Lies Beneath"	Holly Dale	Laurie Finstad-Knizhnik & Janis Ludman	May 7, 2007	101
Detective Mike Sweeney and his family move to Durham County after Mike's partner is murdered. The peaceful life he dreamed of is disturbed by the killings of two teenage girls and a dark rival from his past about his neighbor.
2	2	"The Lady of the Lake"	Holly Dale	Laurie Finstad-Knizhnik	May 14, 2007	102
Mike is drawn into a web of his own deceptions when killing is committed close to home. His daughter suffers the dangers of teen sexuality. Ray Prager is in chaos after his wife leaves him.
3	3	"Divide and Conquer"	Holly Dale	Laurie Finstad-Knizhnik	May 21, 2007	103
Mike finds it extremely difficult to hide an awful secret. Ray crosses paths with a murderer and another woman is killed.
4	4	"Guys and Dolls"	Holly Dale	Laurie Finstad-Knizhnik	May 28, 2007	104
Mike brings Ray in for questioning after evidence is found. Before long, Mike is under suspicion as Prager weaves a net of suspicion around his old rival.
5	5	"Dark Man"	Adrienne Mitchell	Laurie Finstad-Knizhnik	June 4, 2007	105
Ray gets close to Audrey Sweeney so he can manipulate Mike's family. Mike and Audrey reach a boiling point while she defends Ray.
6	6	"Life in the Doll House"	Adrienne Mitchell	Laurie Finstad-Knizhnik	June 11, 2007	106
Mike faces his worst fear—his dark secrets are close to coming out while Ray is violently out of control.

=== Season 2 (2009) ===
No. overall	No. in season	Title	Directed by	Written by	Original release date	Prod. code
7	1	"Little Lost Children"	Adrienne Mitchell	Laurie Finstad-Knizhnik	July 13, 2009	201
Mike Sweeney has been promoted to a new position as Homicide Detective. Ray Prager is in lockdown after killing two women and sexually assaulting Mike's daughter, Sadie. Mike is assigned a case of a possible homicide of a baby and takes it to forensic psychiatrist Pen Verrity to help him understand how the murder happened.
8	2	"Ray Loves Sadie True"	Adrienne Mitchell	Laurie Finstad-Knizhnik	July 20, 2009	202
As Mike tries to deal with a tragic mistake with the case of baby Jane Doe, Internal Affairs and a reporter scrutinize his actions. Sadie begins therapy sessions with Pen as her trauma surfaces, while Pen's husband Jonathan accuses her not only of trying to drown their son Mark but of killing their daughter Bonnie. Mike tries to win back Audrey but Pen orchestrates a plan to keep Mike close and get rid of Audrey.
9	3	"The Fish in the Ocean"	Alain Desrochers	Laurie Finstad-Knizhnik	July 27, 2009	203
The drug overdose that Pen gave Audrey caused more harm than Pen anticipated; Pen is relieved to learn that Audrey will be okay. Mike loses his temper when he finds out Ray's pals served up an alibi and got him off one of the murder charges. Meanwhile, Sadie telephones Ray and learns that her father may be involved in the death of a girl named Lissie Alexie. Pen convinces both her son and Mike that Jonathan is violent; Mike is now thoroughly committed to being her protector.
10	4	"Daddy Hurt Mommy?"	Alain Desrochers	Laurie Finstad-Knizhnik	August 3, 2009	204
Jonathan's "assault" on Pen encourages Mike to push further with the investigation. However, to determine whether Jonathan harmed Bonnie Mike needs to exhume Bonnie's body, something Pen will not allow. Mike's commitment to Pen is shaken when he discovers a fact that seems to confirm Tom's hypothesis that Bonnie was poisoned not by Jonathan, but by her mother. Pen, desperate, sends Mark away with Jonathan then lies to Mike, telling him Mark's been kidnapped. Sadie tells Mike that the boys harassing her at school are the sons of the guys who alibied Ray.
11	5	"Boys Do Things"	Rachel Talalay	Laurie Finstad-Knizhnik	August 10, 2009	205
Sadie, intent on facing her fears so she can stand up at the trial, reenacts what happened between her and Ray at the farmhouse but is devastated when she discovers a braid of hair buried within its walls—the braid is Lissie Alexie's. Convinced that this and the stolen file she found in Mike's briefcase are enough to prove her father is a murderer, Sadie confronts him. Mike is now suspicious of Pen, wondering if she is connected with Audrey's mysterious illness and the murder of Jonathan's girlfriend Molly. Ray's pals force Sadie into their car and take her up to the farm, where they threaten and intimidate her.
12	6	"Surviving the Fall"	Rachel Talalay	Laurie Finstad-Knizhnik	August 17, 2009	206
Tom arrives at the farm, responding to Sadie's call for help. She refuses to acknowledge her father as she tells Tom that Mike and Ray murdered Lissie here. Mark and Jonathan are found, and Jonathan's to be charged with murder, with Mark returning to Pen. To protect Mark, Mike makes amends with Pen, plays the happy lover, and tries to leverage a confession. Glenn tells Mike that he watched Ray and his buddies beat, rape and burn Lissie, but Glenn refuses to make a statement. Sadie acknowledges her fear and vulnerability and stands up in court.

=== Season 3 (2010) ===
No. overall	No. in season	Title	Directed by	Written by	Original release date	Prod. code
13	1	"Homelands"	Adrienne Mitchell	Laurie Finstad-Knizhnik	October 25, 2010	301
Mike, back together with his wife Audrey, now pregnant, investigates two brutal murders in a commuter train depot. Sadie, living with Ray Jr. and just graduated from police college, is assigned to work undercover on the case to gather information. And Mike's partner, Ivan, is a former soldier who has secretly killed his wife in the woods.
14	2	"Family Day"	Adrienne Mitchell	Unknown	November 1, 2010	302
Mike grows suspicious about Ivan when his wife still has not shown up. Sadie tells her mother she is pregnant with Ray Jr.'s baby, but she risks getting in over her head as she goes deeper undercover to get close to David Cho. Ivan has more flashbacks to his time in Kosovo as his memories of the past blur with murders in the present.
15	3	"Distance, Hunting and Home"	Adrienne Mitchell	Laurie Finstad-Knizhnik	November 8, 2010	303
Mike prefers Ivan's brother-in-law Miro for the murder of Ivan's wife. Miro enlists Ivan's help for his drug-running, competing with the Cho operation that is behind the brutal murders. As Ivan's visiting her, Audrey's pregnancy goes bloodily wrong; Ivan, a former medic, insists on cutting the baby out but Audrey dies.
16	4	"Survivors"	Charles Binamé	Laurie Finstad-Knizhnik	November 15, 2010	304
Sadie is enraged after her father slept with Ivan's cousin Mira. Mike drifts from his daughters, cannot bring himself to see his newborn son, and grows angrier with Ivan, now informing him of Miro's plans. Sadie secretly goes undercover. Miro, with Ivan in tow, kills and rips off two of Cho's drug-runners. Mike, certain that Ivan's stringing him along, takes his badge.
17	5	"The World Ends"	Charles Binamé	Laurie Finstad-Knizhnik	November 22, 2010	305
The family prepares for Audrey's cremation service. Sadie, this time officially undercover, finds herself too close for comfort to the killer and chief drug-runner, David Cho's father. Ivan realizes that Miro tricked him into murdering his wife. Mike turns to Ivan for counsel about Sadie, still haunted by her mother's death, but Ivan has a confession of his own to make.
18	6	"Sanctuary"	Charles Binamé	Laurie Finstad-Knizhnik	November 29, 2010	306
After Ivan's drunken confession, Mike and his team obtain a warrant and search Ivan's house for clues to his wife's murder. Sadie represses her memories of killing Julian Cho. Mike releases Ivan so he will lead him to Miro, who has abducted Mira. Sadie tells her father that she is keeping her baby and will marry Ray Jr.

== Distribution ==
All three seasons of Durham County are distributed in Canada by Muse Distribution International and internationally by ITV Global.

All three seasons were filmed in and around Montreal, Quebec.

== DVD releases ==
Anchor Bay Entertainment has released the first two seasons on DVD in Canada only. The third season will be released on February 21, 2012.

In addition to the DVD releases, all three seasons became available in Canada in the iTunes Store on August 1, 2011.

Well Go USA released the first season on DVD in the US. Season 2 was released on November 23, 2010.

DVD name	Ep#	Release date (CAN)	Release date (US)
Season 1	6	September 9, 2008	January 19, 2010
Season 2	6	July 27, 2010	November 23, 2010

== Awards and nominations ==
=== Season 1 ===
- Gemini Awards
  - Best Writing in a Dramatic Series
  - Best Direction in a Dramatic Series
  - Best Performance by an Actor in a Continuing Leading Dramatic Role
  - Best Performance by an Actress in a Continuing Leading Dramatic Role
  - Best Sound in a Dramatic Series
- Gemini Nominations
  - Best Dramatic Series
  - Best Photography in a Dramatic Program
  - Best Picture Editing in a Dramatic Program
  - Best Costume Design
  - Best Achievement in Casting
  - Best Performance by an Actress in a Supporting Series
  - Best Performance by an Actor in a Continuing Leading Role
- Directors Guild of Canada
  - Nominations
    - Best Editing – Dramatic Series
    - Best Direction – Television Series
- Canadian Film and Television Production Association (CFTPA)
  - Indie Award - Best Dramatic Series
- 2008 WorldFest – Houston International Film Festival
  - Winner of Gold Award
  - Best TV Series - Dramatic
- Directors Guild of Canada Award Nominations
  - Team Television Series – Drama
  - Production Design – Television Series
- Writers Guild of Canada Award Nomination
  - Best Writing in a Dramatic Series
- Alliance of Canadian Cinema, Television and Radio Artists
  - Montreal Awards Nominations
  - Outstanding Female Performance
  - Outstanding Male Performance
- Leo Awards Nomination
  - Best Supporting Performance by a Female in a Dramatic Series
  - Best Supporting Performance by a Male in a Dramatic Series

=== Season 2 ===
- Gemini Awards
  - Best Achievement in Main Title Design - Kevin Chandoo
  - Best Achievement in Make-Up - Eva Coudouloux and Adrien Morot
- Gemini Nominations
  - Best Dramatic Series
  - Best Direction in a Dramatic Series - Adrienne Mitchell
  - Best Performance by an Actress in a Continuing Leading Dramatic Role - Helene Joy
  - Best Achievement in Casting - Andrea Kenyon, Wendy O'Brien, Marissa Richmond, and Randi Wells
- Monte-Carlo Television Festival
  - Winner of 2010 Golden Nymph Award
  - Outstanding Actress- Michelle Forbes (Drama TV Series)
- Monte-Carlo Television Festival Nominations
  - Outstanding Actor – Hugh Dillon (Drama TV Series)
  - Outstanding International Producer – Janis Lundman, Adrienne Mitchell, Laurie Finstad Knizhnik and Michael Prupas (Drama TV Series)
- Directors Guild of Canada Award Winners
  - Best Direction- TV Series - Adrienne Mitchell
  - Best Production Design- TV Series - Donna Noonan
- Directors Guild of Canada Award Nominee
  - Best Picture Editing- TV Series
- EMPixx Awards
  - Platinum Award for Best National Cable Program in the Entertainment Category
- WorldFest – Houston International Film Festival
  - Winner of the Platinum Award - Best TV Series – Drama

=== Season 3 ===
- Gemini Award Wins
  - Best Achievement in Casting - Marissa Richmond, Libby Goldstein, Andrea Kenyon, Suzanne Smith, Randi Wells
- Gemini Award Nominations
  - Best Direction in a Dramatic Series - Charles Biname
  - Best Sound in a Dramatic Series - Steve Moore, Alex Bullick, Yann Cleary, Christian Cooke, Andrea Higgins, Jill Purdy, Marilee Yorston
  - Best Performance by an Actor in a Continuing Lead Dramatic Role - Hugh Dillon
  - Best Performance by an Actor in a Guest Role, Dramatic Series - Michael Nardone
  - Best Performance by an Actress in Featured Supporting Role in a Dramatic Series - Benedicte Decary
- Directors Guild of Canada Award Nominations
  - Best Direction - Television Series - Adrienne Mitchell
  - Best Sound Editing - Television Series - Jill Purdy, Alex Bullick, Rose Gregoris
- 2011 EMPixx Awards
  - Platinum Award - Entertainment Category - Janis Lundman, Adrienne Mitchell, Michael Prupas and Laurie Finstad Knizhnik
  - Platinum Award - Writing - Laurie Finstad Knizhnik
  - Platinum Award - Art Direction and Set Design - Donna Noonan
  - Platinum Award - Cinematography - Eric Cayla
  - Platinum Award - Editing - Teresa De Luca
  - Platinum Award - Editing - Michele Conroy
  - Platinum Award - Directing - Adrienne Mitchell
  - Platinum Award - Music Composition - Peter Chapman
- 2011 WorldFest-Houston Remi Awards
  - Winner of a Gold 2011 Worldfest Remi Award in the category of TV Series - Dramatic.
- 'WorldFest-Houston International Film Festival 2011
  - Nominated for 5 awards including: Outstanding International Producers (Janis Lundman, Adrienne Mitchell, Michael Prupas), Outstanding Actor (Hugh Dillon, Michael Nardone) and Outstanding Actress (Hélène Joy, Laurence Leboeuf).
- Remi Award Nominations
  - Nominated for a 2011 Worldfest Remi Award in the category of TV Series - Dramatic.
- Interactive Media 2010 Award
  - Best in Class - Television in recognition of Durham County - Season 3 Website www.durhamcounty.ca
- WGC Screenwriting Award
  - Script for "Distance, Hunting and Home", written by Laurie Finstad Knizhnik, was chosen as a finalist
