= Halbert Powers Gillette =

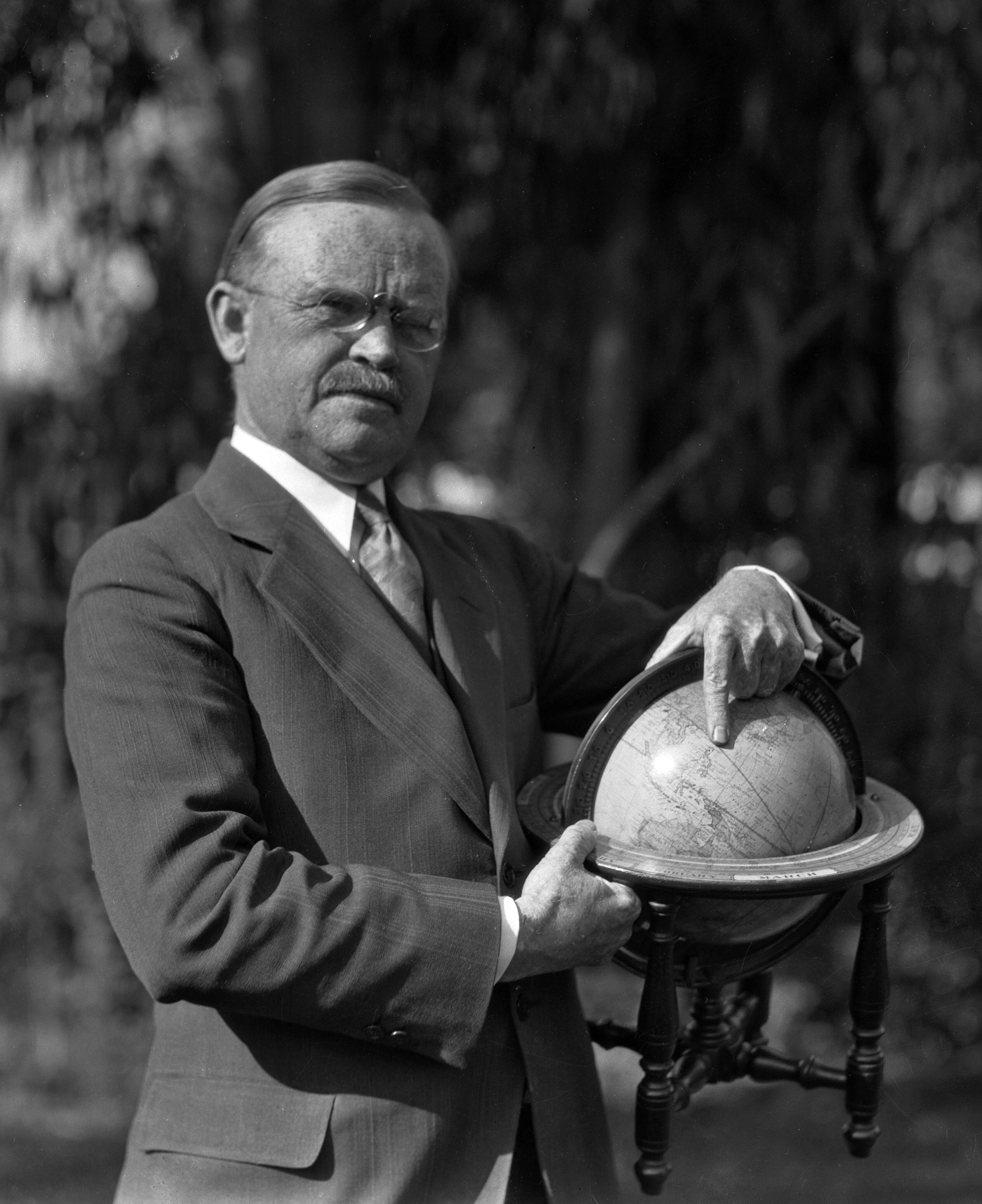
Halbert P. Gillette, 1930

Halbert Powers Gillette (1869–1958) was an American engineer and prolific author of textbooks and handbooks for the engineering and construction fields.

== Biography ==
Born on August 5, 1869, in Waverly, Iowa, to Theodore Weld and Laetitia S. (Powers), Gillette attended the Hammond Hall Academy in Salt Lake City, from which he graduated in 1886. Six years later in 1892, he received his engineering degree at the School of Mines at Columbia University, where he was classmate of Edward B. Durham.

After some years working in the industry, Gillette served as assistant New York State Engineer under Campbell W. Adams from 1896 to 1898. The next three years he worked as a contractor, and from 1903 to 1905 he was associate editor of the Engineering News. In 1905, he founded Scranton Gillette Communications, Inc., where he became president. From 1906 to 1907, he served as chief engineer of the Washington Railroad Commission. Later, Gillette became an instructor of science at Columbia University.

Gillette was a member of the American Society of Consulting Engineers, the American Society of Civil Engineers, the American Society of Engineering Contractors, the American Institute of Mining Engineers, and the Society for the Promotion of Engineering Education.

Gillette died on June 18, 1958, and was buried in Forest Lawn Memorial Park in Glendale, California.

== Work ==
Starting in the early 1900s, Gillette wrote and co-wrote more than a dozen books on topics ranging from rock excavation, to management and cost accounting, to his latest work in the 1930s on forecasting weather.

=== Rock excavation: methods and cost, 1900s–1910s ===
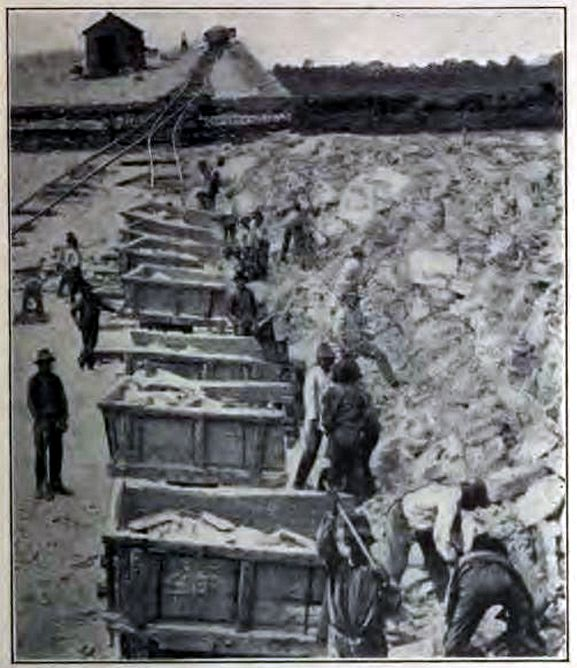
Construction of Chicago Drainage Canal, 1900s

Gillette his first book on earthworks, entitled Earthwork and Its Cost, was prized for its verve and clarity as well as its technical comprehensiveness. In its preface Gillette (1903) explained:

There are few engineering works of magnitude that do not involve the excavation of earth. Indeed the cost of earthwork forms one of the greatest of cost items in canal, in reservoir and in railway construction, nor is it an inconsiderable item in the construction of roads, sewers or water works. What will this excavation cost? This is a question that the engineer first asks himself in making his preliminary estimates. Later the same question confronts the contractor. To the engineer an erroneous answer may mean loss of reputation, to the contractor it assuredly means ruin where the work is extensive. A glance at the wide range in contract bids for most earthwork jobs will convince anyone that few contractors do more than guess at costs. While the numberless engineering structures that have cost more than the preliminary estimates prove quite as conclusively that engineers too often guess also.

Gillette said that this was "the first published volume treating of earth economics in a comprehensive way." In line with this topic Gillette in 1904 published Rock excavation: methods and cost. In its preface Gillette (1904) gave an introduction of mineral production and rock excavation:

The value of the mineral products of America annually exceeds $1,000,000,000. For explosives alone the sum of $20,000,000 is expended each year, and it is well within limits to say that fully twice as great a sum is paid out to drillers and blasters. When we consider the labor, the power and the powder required to mine and to quarry products in the aggregate so enormously valuable, we can not fail to be impressed with the scantiness of literature on the economics of rock excavation. A dozen years ago, when called upon to estimate the cost of some open cut rock excavation, I was astonished to find no text book that in the least served to guide me. I subsequently learned also that most of the matter to be found in the few books on blasting was either theoretic or too meagre to be of material value. What was true then has unfortunately remained true.

In 1916, Gillette published the enlarged Handbook of Rock Excavation. Juniper Prize-winning author Steve Yates wrote, "Here was a book created when engineers could still write like Henry David Thoreau and think like James B. Eads. Gillette covered rock work and quarrying methods from ancient hand drills through steam's dominance in mining to just before the advent of gas-powered drills."

=== Construction cost keeping and management, 1900s ===
In the 1900s Gillette published as series of books on the more topic of construction cost keeping and management, which included:

- Economics of road construction, first published in 1906.
- Handbook of cost data for contractors and engineers, first published in 1907.
- Concrete Construction: Methods and Cost, first published in 1908, and
- Construction Cost Keeping and Management, written with Richard T. Dana and first published in 1909.

==== Offices appliances ====
In Construction Cost Keeping and Management, Dana & Gillette (1909) gave an overview of the many appliances which were used in his days to compile records, and process information in business offices, including time clocks, the mimeograph, mechanical calculators (separate adding machines and multiplying machines), etc.

Offices appliances and methods, 1909
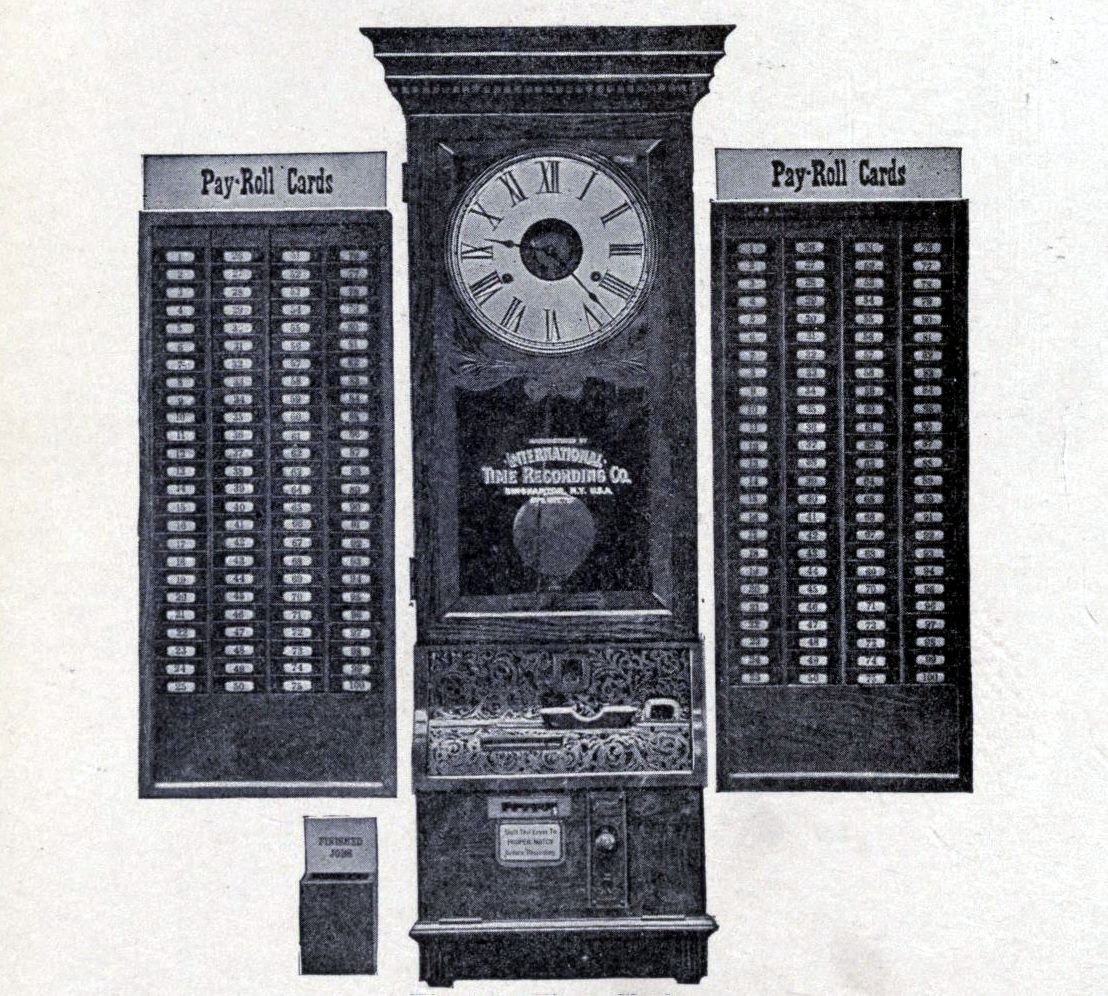
Time clock, 1909

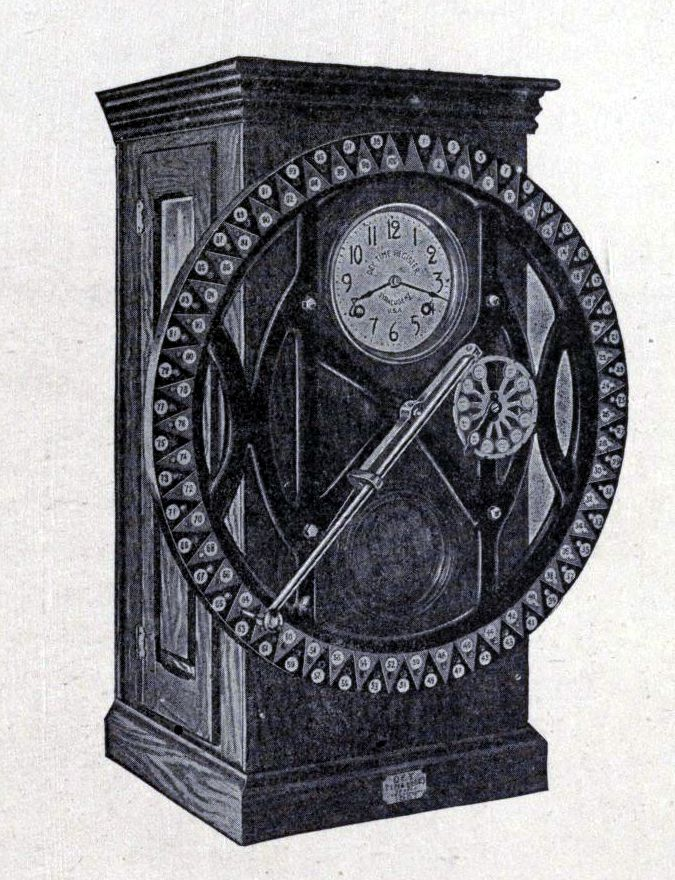
Time clock, 1909

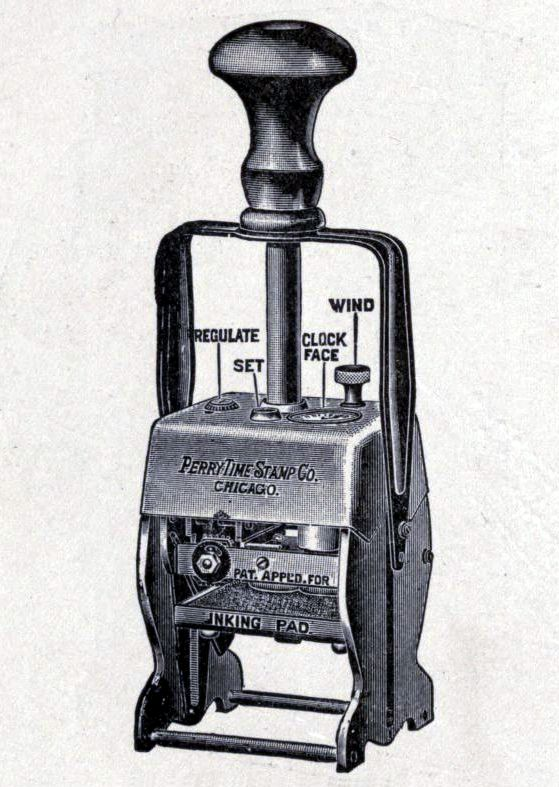
Time stamp, 1909

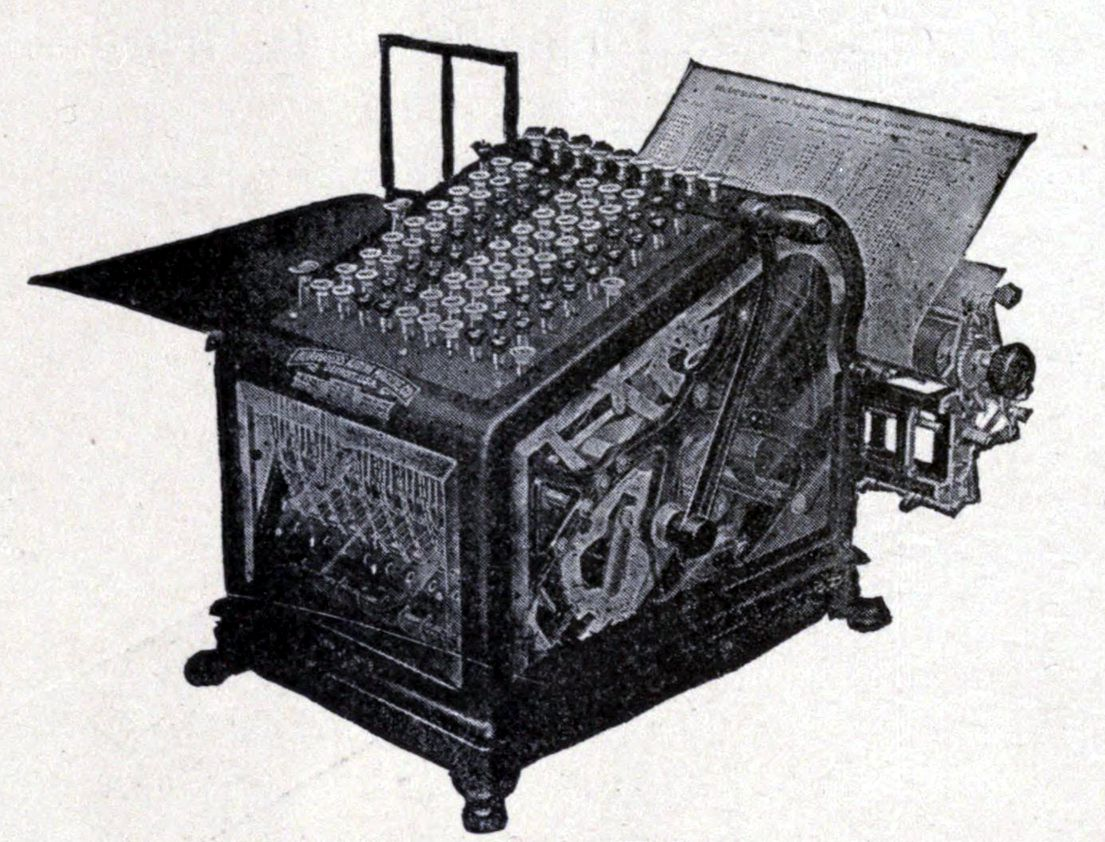
Adding machine, 1909

Gillette wrote, "Such an appliance which may not, in general, be used in the field, but which is of immense value in the office and particularly in a shop, is the time clock. Various forms of time clocks are in common use, two types of which are illustrated. [The first] is a time card recorder, which is a clock so no made that it will automatically stamp on a card inserted in a slot in the clock by the workman the time of his arrival and of his departure. The cards are made to hold a record covering the pay period and need no attention from a timekeeper or clerk until the termination of this period. The record of the men's time can then be compiled very readily by one who need not be a skilled mathematician or time clerk."

And furthermore, "the time clock system has been developed very highly in shops for keeping track of time used in completing any job by workmen, but as this in a way is not in the realm of field cost keeping, it will not be entered into here. Another form of time clock, shown in [the second image], has the numbers of the employees fixed on the outer edge of a disk or ring and a record is made by the employee who shifts a revolving arm and punches his number upon entering the office and leaving."

=== Fundamental divisions of cost ===
In Cost keeping and management engineering, Dana & Gillette (1909) went into the topic of the fundamental divisions of cost. They made clear, that such a subdivision can be illustrated (see image) but is not complete. Dana & Gillette explained:

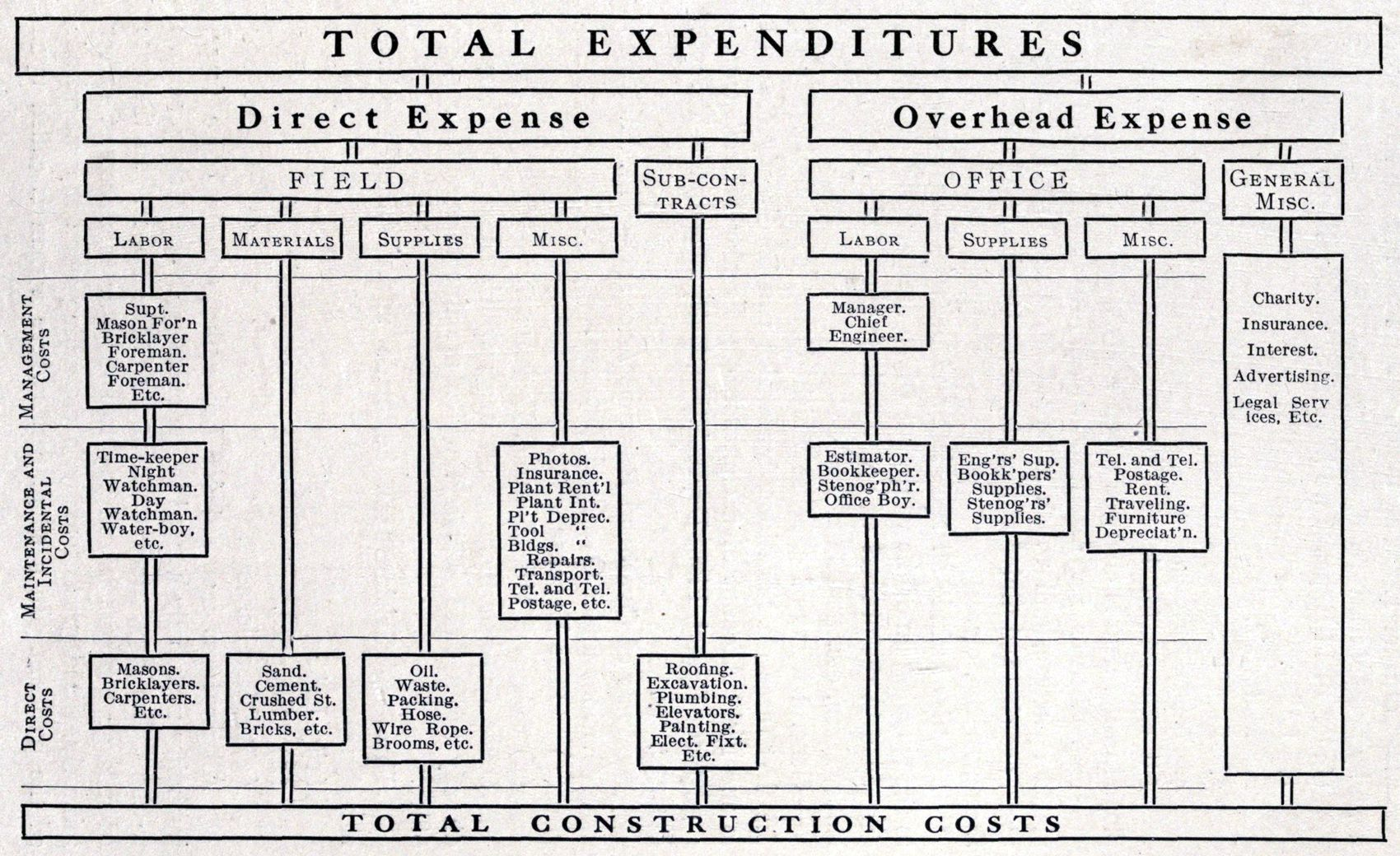
Chart of total construction costs, 1909

... it would be futile to attempt to make a complete outline that would apply to any contracting firm. Keeping books is writing the history of business transactions; hence, it is obvious that no outline of the 'history' can be made until the 'events' are known. Even though two firms are in the same line of work, these 'events' are never of quite the same nature in both concerns. Therefore, it is clear that before an outline of the records of a concern can be made, that particular concern must be studied to learn the nature of all its transactions. For this reason no general discussion of the methods of keeping accounts for any line of business can hope to be more than thoroughly suggestive.

Dana & Gillette continued that "every source of expense to a contracting business contributes to the total cost of the contracts carried by the firm. A certain proportion of the Office Rent, the Legal Expenses in connection with lawsuits, the cost of making unsuccessful tenders, etc., are just as much a part of the cost as wages paid to carpenters and bricklayers. To allocate these various costs seems a difficult problem, but the first step is simple, for each item can be readily classified..." They proposed the following divisions :

- Direct Expense: Direct Expense includes all expenditures that pertain to only one contract, and that can be charged to that contract without subdivision or apportionment.
- Overhead Expense : Overhead Expense includes all expenditures that pertain to all the contracts carried, and that cannot be charged to the individual contracts without subdivision or apportionment.

The Direct Expense Account is divided into two parts:

1. Field Expense: Field Expense includes all items which can be directly charged to the work in the field.
2. Sub-Contract Expense. Sub-Contract Expense includes all amounts paid for work done by sub-contractors.

Under Field Expense we have four subdivisions :

1. Labor: All expense for labor (except when sub-contracted) employed in the field is charged under Labor.
2. Materials: Expenditures for materials which are found in the completed structure, and which are paid for according to the contract, are charged under Materials; e. g., Cement, Sand, Crushed Stone, Bricks, etc.
3. Supplies: Supplies include all such items of material as are necessary to the carrying on of the work, but which are partially, or wholly, destroyed in the process of construction; e. g.. Oil, Waste, Coal, Rope, Hose, etc.
4. Miscellaneous: General items of expense which do not come under any of the first three classifications, but which can be directly charged to the Field Account of a contract, come under Miscellaneous; e. g., Plant Rental, Plant Depreciation, Telephone and Telegraph, Postage, etc.

Dana & Gillette (1909) continue with a further description of the analysis of overhead expense accounts.

==== Time sheet ====
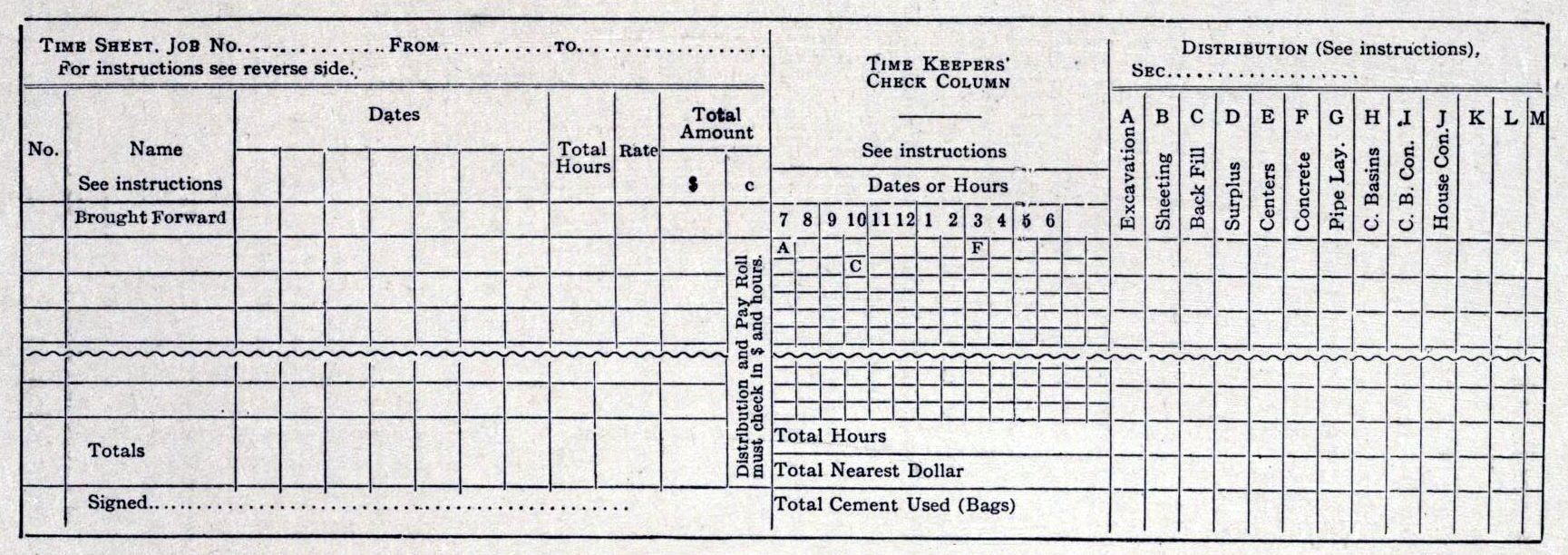
Time sheet, front, 1909

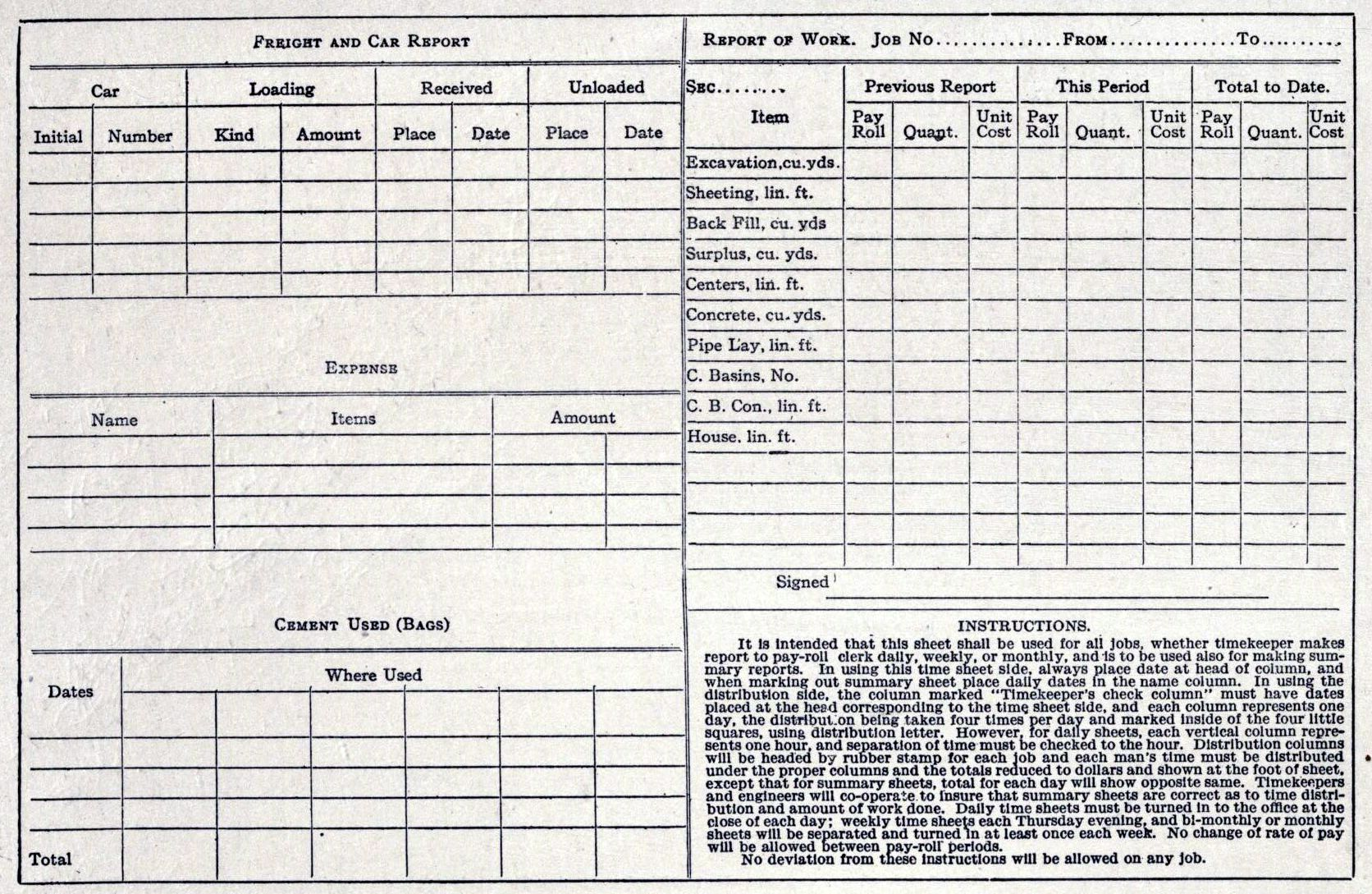
Time sheet, back, 1909

In his 1908 Cost Keeping and Management Engineering Gillette presented a cost keeping system and its application to sewer work, which incorporated an advanced type of time book, which he called time sheet. This form resembles actually the fully developed time book, and not a modern time sheet. Gillette explained how this system worked at an engineering designing and general contracting office in Indianapolis, Indiana:

The essential and fundamental feature of the system depends upon the form of the time sheet used (front view of time sheet (first image), and back view (second image)). The time sheet is folded when in use by the timekeeper and carried in a cover, making the same of book size, and practically the same form as the ordinary time book. On the left hand side of the front appears the time sheet in the usual form.

This time sheet is arranged so that it may be used for a gang reporting time weekly, and is also used where the time sheet is turned in each day, in which latter case the lines under the column dates are ignored and the time placed in the total hour column. On the left hand side appears first the timekeeper's check column...

Gillette concluded that "this form of timekeeping would be of value because of the system of uniformity alone, even if no regard were given to the other features mentioned, although the above companies using this report are satisfied that they are securing more valuable data by this form than they would have ever been able to do by previous forms used. The value of the uniform time sheet lies in the education of the timekeepers, resulting in a more efficient working force. Under the old system with individual time sheets, prepared especially for each job, the forms of the time sheets were many and various, and, for this very reason timekeepers presumed to incorporate their own ideas and make changes and innovations, resulting in a bunch of data that required hours, and generally the personal attendance of the timekeepers, to work out."

=== Forecasting weather conditions, 1920s–1930s ===
In the last decennia of his working live Gillette had focussed his attention to the study of weather cycles, and in 1937 published his last book, entitled Climatic Cycles Reflected in Geological Data. A 1943 article in the Theosophy magazine summarized Gillette's efforts:

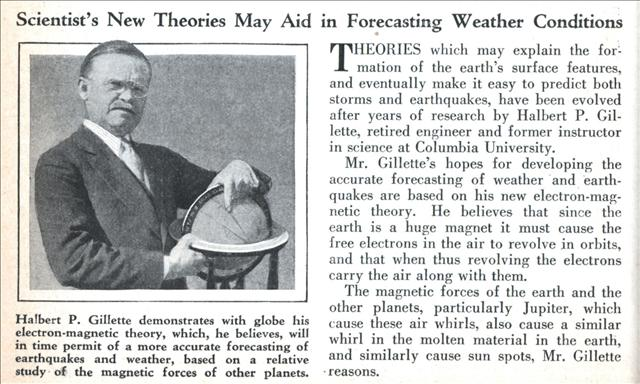
"Scientist's New Theories May Aid in Forecasting Weather Conditions", article 1930.

For many years Mr. Halbert P. Gillette ... has made an intensive study of weather cycles. In the beginning his theories made such bizarre reading from the point of view of scientists, that little attention seems to have been paid to them. Essentially, they were based on theories of interflow of electrons between the earth, the sun, and the other planets. The real nature of electrons, and their ubiquity, now being better recognized, his ideas fall more into line with the thought of the day.
Gillette has sought to tie up his theories to the clay varves, or seasonal layers, in lake deposits. Among the most important of the cycles discovered, is one of approximately 605 years, subdivided into three equal periods of less importance. This is equal to 51 orbital periods of Jupiter. He believes that it represents the orbital period of Pickering's undiscovered "Planet P." Pickering's estimate of this orbital period was 656 years.

And furthermore:

Gillette claims that whenever a planet is in solar longitude either of 108 or 288 degrees, it causes a peak of a rainfall cycle, whether evidenced by rainfall records, tree rings, or varves. Such peaks coincide with sunspot maxima. In addition to the major cycle produced by each planet, it causes harmonic sub-cycles of 1/3, 1/9, 1/27 of the length of the major one, etc. The great maxima and minima of rainfall, of course, come when peaks and depressions of cycles and subcycles coincide. According to Gillette we are progressing toward a period of great drought whose apex will be 1984. Volcanic upheavals and compass variations appear to have cycles closely coinciding with the major rain cycles, he says...

The article confirms the "this coincidence of cycles is of vast importance in the occult side of nature; as is well known to Theosophists, the years 1897-98 signalized a coincidence of cycles, the longest of which was about 5,000 years, of such intensity that the entire world order was upset by it."

== Selected publications ==
- Gillette, Halbert Powers. Earthwork and Its Costs: A Handbook of Earth Excavation. McGraw-Hill Book Company, Incorporated, 1903; 1907; 1912, 1920.
- Gillette, Halbert Powers. Rock excavation: methods and cost. New York : M.C Clark, 1904.
- Gillette, Halbert Powers. Economics of road construction. Engineering News Publishing Company, 1906.
- Gillette, Halbert Powers. Handbook of cost data for contractors and engineers, M. C. Clark, 1907.
- Gillette, Halbert Powers, and Charles S. Hill. Concrete Construction: Methods and Cost. Clark, 1908.
- Gillette, Halbert Powers, and Richard T. Dana. Construction Cost Keeping and Management. Gillette Publishing Company, 1909, 1922, 1927.
- Gillette, Halbert Powers, and Richard T. Dana. Cost Keeping and Management engineering. Gillette Publishing Company, 1909.
- Gillette, Halbert Powers. Handbook of Rock Excavation, Methods and Costs, New York, Clark book company, inc., 1916.
- Halbert Powers Gillette, Handbook of clearing and grubbing methods and cost. 1917.
- Gillette, Halbert Powers, and Richard T. Dana. Handbook of mechanical and electrical cost data, 1918
- Halbert P. Gillette, A. R. Losh, James J. Tobin. Highway Cost Keeping. United States. Department of Agriculture, 1919
- Gillette, Halbert Powers. Handbook of construction cost. McGraw-Hill book company, inc., 1922.
- Halbert P. Gillette. Climatic Cycles Reflected in Geological Data, 1937.

Periodicals:

- Gillette, Halbert Powers. Engineering & Contracting. Engineering and Contracting Publishing Company, 1906–1932.
