= Durham City =

Durham City or City of Durham may refer to:

England

- Durham, England, the county town of County Durham
- Durham and Framwelgate, a former local government district, which held city status until 1974
- City of Durham (district), a former local government district, which held city status 1974–2009
- City of Durham (parish), a civil parish formed in 2018
- City of Durham (UK Parliament constituency)
- Durham City A.F.C., a football team
- Durham City RFC, a rugby union team

North America

- Durham, North Carolina
- Regional Municipality of Durham

== See also ==
- Durham (disambiguation)
