= New Durham =

New Durham may refer to:

== Places ==
In Canada

- Located near Norwich, Ontario

In the United Kingdom

- New Durham, Durham, east of Durham

In the United States

- New Durham Township, LaPorte County, Indiana
- New Durham, New Hampshire
- New Durham, Middlesex County, New Jersey
- New Durham, North Bergen, New Jersey

== See also ==
- Durham (disambiguation)
