= Durham Township, Washington County, Arkansas =

Township of Durham
- Township
- Location of Durham Township in Washington County

- Location of Washington County in Arkansas
- Coordinates: 35°56′45″N 93°58′46″W
- Country: United States
- State: Arkansas
- County: Washington
- Established: 1884

Area
  - Total: 23.8 sq mi (62 km^{2})
  - Land: 23.8 sq mi (62 km^{2})
  - Water: 0.0 sq mi (0 km^{2}) 0%
- Elevation: 1,280 ft (390 m)

Population (2000)
  - Total: 839
  - Density: 32/sq mi (12/km^{2})
- Time zone: UTC-6 (CST)
  - Summer (DST): UTC-5 (CDT)
- Area code: 479
- GNIS feature ID: 69785

The Township of Durham is one of thirty-seven townships in Washington County, Arkansas, USA. As of the 2000 census, its total population was 839.

Durham Township was established in 1884.

== Geography ==
According to the United States Census Bureau, Durham Township covers an area of 26.5 square miles (69 km^{2}); all land. Durham Township was created in 1884.

=== Cities, towns, villages ===
- Durham

=== Cemeteries ===
The township contains Shumate Cemetery.

=== Major routes ===
- Arkansas Highway 16
