= List of places in Florida: D =

This list of current cities, towns, unincorporated communities, counties, and other recognized places in the U.S. state of Florida also includes information on the number and names of counties in which the place lies, and its lower and upper zip code bounds, if applicable.

| Name of place | Number of counties | Counties | Lower zip code | Upper zip code |
|---|---|---|---|---|
| Dade City | 1 | Pasco | 33525 | |
| Dade City East | 1 | Pasco | 33525 | |
| Dade City North | 1 | Pasco | 33525 | |
| Dadeland | 1 | Miami-Dade | 33156 | |
| Dahlberg | 1 | Palm Beach | | |
| Dahoma | 1 | Nassau | | |
| Daisy Lake | 1 | Volusia | | |
| Dalhousie Acres | 1 | Lake | | |
| Dalkeith | 1 | Gulf | 32465 | |
| Dallas | 1 | Marion | | |
| Dame Point Manor | 1 | Duval | | |
| Dames Point | 1 | Duval | 32226 | |
| Dames Point Junction | 1 | Duval | 32226 | |
| Dames Point Manor | 1 | Duval | | |
| Dania | 1 | Broward | 33004 | |
| Dania Beach | 1 | Broward | 33004 | |
| Dania Indian Reservation | 1 | Broward | | |
| Danks Corner | 1 | Marion | 32691 | |
| Danville | 1 | Union | | |
| Darby | 1 | Pasco | 33525 | |
| Darlington | 1 | Walton | 32464 | |
| Darsey | 1 | Gadsden | | |
| Davenport | 1 | Polk | 33837 | |
| Davie | 1 | Broward | 33328 | |
| Davis Shores | 1 | St. Johns | | |
| Day | 1 | Lafayette | 32013 | |
| Daysville | 1 | Alachua | | |
| Daytona Beach | 1 | Volusia | 32114 | 29 |
| Daytona Beach Shores | 1 | Volusia | 32118 | |
| Daytona Highridge Estates | 1 | Volusia | 32114 | |
| Daytona North | 1 | Flagler | | |
| Daytona Park Estates | 1 | Volusia | 32720 | |
| Deadman Landing | 1 | Volusia | | |
| Deanville | 1 | Flagler | | |
| DeBary | 1 | Volusia | 32713 | |
| Deem City | 1 | Palm Beach | | |
| Deep Creek | 1 | Charlotte | 33983 | |
| Deep Lake | 1 | Collier | 33926 | |
| Deerfield Beach | 1 | Broward | 33441 | 43 |
| Deering Bay | 1 | Miami-Dade | | |
| Deerland | 1 | Okaloosa | 32536 | |
| Deer Park | 1 | Osceola | 32901 | |
| Deer Run | 1 | Brevard | | |
| Deerwood | 1 | Duval | 32216 | |
| Deerwood Club | 1 | Duval | | |
| DeFuniak Springs | 1 | Walton | 32433 | |
| Dekle Beach | 1 | Taylor | 32347 | |
| Delaco | 1 | Okaloosa | 32536 | |
| DeLand | 1 | Volusia | 32720 | 24 |
| DeLand Highlands | 1 | Volusia | 32720 | |
| DeLand Junction | 1 | Volusia | | |
| DeLand Southwest | 1 | Volusia | | |
| DeLeon Springs | 1 | Volusia | 32130 | |
| DeLeon Springs Heights | 1 | Volusia | | |
| Delespine | 1 | Brevard | 32780 | |
| Dell | 1 | Suwannee | | |
| Dellwood | 1 | Jackson | 32442 | |
| Dellwood | 1 | Leon | | |
| Dellwood | 1 | Pinellas | | |
| Delray | 1 | Palm Beach | 33444 | |
| Delray Beach | 1 | Palm Beach | 33444 | 47 |
| Delray Gardens | 1 | Palm Beach | 33444 | |
| Delray Shores | 1 | Palm Beach | 33444 | |
| Delray Square | 1 | Palm Beach | 33445 | |
| Del Rio | 1 | Hillsborough | 33617 | |
| Delta | 1 | Palm Beach | | |
| Deltona | 1 | Volusia | 32725 | |
| Delwood Beach | 1 | Bay | | |
| Demory Hill | 1 | Dixie | | |
| Denaud | 1 | Hendry | 33935 | |
| Denham | 1 | Pasco | | |
| Dennet | 1 | Madison | | |
| Denver | 1 | Putnam | | |
| DeSoto City | 1 | Highlands | 33870 | |
| Desoto Lakes | 1 | Sarasota | 33580 | |
| De Soto National Memorial | 1 | Manatee | 33505 | |
| De Soto Square Mall | 1 | Manatee | 33505 | |
| Destin | 1 | Okaloosa | 32541 | |
| Destiny | 1 | Osceola | | |
| Devils Garden | 1 | Hendry | 33440 | |
| Dewey | 1 | Hillsborough | | |
| Dewey Park | 1 | Duval | 32230 | |
| Diamond | 1 | Polk | | |
| Dickerson City | 1 | Santa Rosa | 32570 | |
| Dickert | 1 | Suwannee | | |
| Dills | 1 | Jefferson | 32344 | |
| Dinkins | 1 | Suwannee | | |
| Dinner Island | 1 | Flagler | | |
| Dinsmore | 1 | Duval | 32219 | |
| Diplomat Mall | 1 | Broward | 33009 | |
| Dirego Park | 1 | Bay | 32401 | |
| Dixie | 1 | Hernando | | |
| Dixie Grove | 1 | Pasco | 33589 | |
| Dixieland | 1 | Polk | 33803 | |
| Dixie Ranch Acres | 1 | Okeechobee | 33472 | |
| Dixie Village | 1 | Orange | 32806 | |
| Dixonville | 1 | Santa Rosa | | |
| Doctor Phillips | 1 | Orange | | |
| Doctors Inlet | 1 | Clay | 32030 | |
| Doctor's Lake Estates | 1 | Clay | 32073 | |
| Dogtown | 1 | Gadsden | 32351 | |
| Dogwood Lake Estates | 1 | Holmes | 32425 | |
| Dolomite | 1 | Sarasota | | |
| Dona Vista | 1 | Lake | 32784 | |
| Don-Ce-Sar Place | 1 | Pinellas | | |
| Donner | 1 | Duval | | |
| Dopler | 1 | Hendry | | |
| Doral | 1 | Miami-Dade | | |
| Dorcas | 1 | Okaloosa | 32536 | |
| Dorena | 1 | Flagler | | |
| Dorset | 1 | Palm Beach | 33438 | |
| Douglas City | 1 | Gadsden | 32351 | |
| Douglass Crossroads | 1 | Walton | 32455 | |
| Dover | 1 | Hillsborough | 33527 | |
| Dover Shores | 1 | Orange | 32806 | |
| Dowling Park | 1 | Suwannee | 32060 | |
| Downtown | 1 | Collier | 33940 | |
| Downtown | 1 | Duval | 32201 | |
| Downtown | 1 | Escambia | 32501 | |
| Downtown | 1 | Hillsborough | 33602 | |
| Downtown | 1 | Lee | 33901 | |
| Downtown | 1 | Miami-Dade | 33233 | |
| Downtown | 1 | Orange | 32801 | |
| Downtown | 1 | Palm Beach | 33432 | |
| Downtown | 1 | St. Lucie | 33450 | |
| Downtown | 1 | Santa Rosa | 32570 | |
| Downtown | 1 | Volusia | 32014 | |
| Drayton Island | 1 | Putnam | 32039 | |
| Dreamworld | 1 | Seminole | 32771 | |
| Drew | 1 | Hillsborough | | |
| Drexel | 1 | Pasco | 33539 | |
| Drifton | 1 | Jefferson | 32344 | |
| Driftwood | 1 | Broward | | |
| Driftwood Acres | 1 | Broward | | |
| Druid Hills | 1 | Seminole | 32751 | |
| Dublin | 1 | Lake | | |
| Duck Key | 1 | Monroe | 33050 | |
| Duda | 1 | Palm Beach | | |
| Duette | 1 | Manatee | 33834 | |
| Dukes | 1 | Union | 32054 | |
| Dummit Grove | 1 | Brevard | | |
| Dunbar Heights | 1 | Lee | | |
| Dundee | 1 | Polk | 33838 | |
| Dunedin | 1 | Pinellas | 34698 | |
| Dunedin Isles | 1 | Pinellas | 33528 | |
| Dunes Road | 1 | Palm Beach | | |
| Dunlawton | 1 | Volusia | 32119 | |
| Dunn Avenue | 1 | Duval | 32218 | |
| Dunn Creek | 1 | Duval | | |
| Dunnellon | 1 | Marion | 34430 | |
| Dupont | 1 | Flagler | 32010 | |
| Dupont Center | 1 | St. Johns | | |
| Dupree Gardens | 1 | Pasco | | |
| Durant | 1 | Hillsborough | 33530 | |
| Durant Estates | 1 | Alachua | | |
| Durbin | 1 | St. Johns | | |
| Durham | 1 | Calhoun | 32424 | |
| Durward | 1 | Leon | | |
| Duval | 1 | Duval | 32218 | |
| Dyal | 1 | Nassau | | |
| Dyer | 1 | Palm Beach | | |

== See also ==
- Florida
- List of municipalities in Florida
- List of former municipalities in Florida
- List of counties in Florida
- List of census-designated places in Florida
