= Durham Academy =

Durham Academy refer to:

- Durham Academy, North Carolina, an independent school in Durham, North Carolina, United States
- Durham Academy, Ushaw Moor, a secondary school in Ushaw Moor, County Durham, England

== See also ==
- Durham (disambiguation)
