= Durham County =

Durham County or County Durham may refer to:

== Places ==
- Durham County, New South Wales, Australia
- Durham County, Queensland, Australia
- Durham County, Western Australia, Australia
- Durham County, Ontario, Canada
- County Durham, England
  - County Durham (district), unitary authority area
  - County Durham (constituency), constituency of the Parliament of the United Kingdom
  - County Palatine of Durham, historic county
- Durham County, North Carolina, United States

== Other uses ==
- Durham County (TV series)

== See also ==
- Durham Regional Municipality, Ontario, Canada
- Durham (disambiguation)
