= Durham (1814 ship) =

History

France
- Launched: 1813
- Captured: c.1814

United Kingdom
- Name: Durham
- Namesake: Durham, England
- Owner: 1814:Braton & CO.; 1817:Hancock & Co.; 1818:Cook (or Cooke) & Co.
- Acquired: c.1814 (by purchase of a prize)
- Fate: Foundered 1819

General characteristics
- Tons burthen: 346, or 351, or 352 (bm)

Durham was launched in France in 1813 under another name and taken c.1814. New owners named her Durham. She traded with Newfoundland, the Caribbean, and South America. She was lost in 1819, believed foundered with all hands on her way back to Liverpool from the Dutch East Indies.

== Career ==
Durham first appeared in Lloyd's Register (LR) in 1814 with Turnbull, master, Barton & Co., owners, and trade Liverpool–Newfoundland. On 25 July 1814 she sailed from Cork, bound for Newfoundland. She arrived at Newfoundland on 7 September. From there she sailed to Barbados, where she arrived on 27 October.

On 27 November, Durham was at Demerara, having come from Newfoundland. On 12 July 1815 Durham was at Demerara, having come from Barbados. She had come via New Providence, and Bermuda. She arrived back at Liverpool on 6 December, having left Guadeloupe on 27 October, and having lost her mainmast on the way.

Durham, Walker, master, returned to Liverpool on 23 November 1816, having sailed from Pernambuco on 4 October. Before she had arrived at Pernambuco on 14 September, she had been at Rio de Janeiro.

Durham sailed from Liverpool to Pernambuco, and back in 1817. She arrived at Liverpool on 8 April, having left Pernambuco on 1 March.

On 3 September 1817 Durham, Darnault, master, arrived at Buenos Aires from Liverpool. She sailed via Bahia, which she left on 11 December, and arrived back at Liverpool on 5 February 1818,

Lloyd's Register for 1818 showed Durham with F. Darnald, master, Hancock, owner, and trade London–Brazils, changing to London–Batavia.

Durham, F. Darnault, master, Cooke & Co., owners, next sailed to the East Indies under a license issued by the British East India Company.

On 22 April 1818, Durnham, Darnault master, was at 4°18′N 23°50′W. She was 24 days out of Liverpool, and on her way to Batavia. She arrived in Batavia in early July.

== Fate ==
On 4 October 1818 Durham left Batavia for Liverpool. Durham was sighted off Cape Clear Island, County Cork, on 6 January 1819, bound for Liverpool. She had not been heard from since. She was presumed foundered in the Irish Sea with the loss of all hands.
