= Susan Durham =

Neurosurgeon

Susan Durham is an American Board Certified Neurosurgeon and a Member of The Society of Neurological Surgeons. A professor of neurosurgery at the University of Southern California Keck School of Medicine, she is also Division Chief of Pediatric Neurosurgery at the Children's Hospital of Los Angeles.

== Education & career ==
After studying at the University of Pittsburgh School of Medicine, Durham did an internship and a residency in neurosurgery at the University of Pennsylvania. That was followed by a pediatric neurosurgery fellowship at Children's Hospital Los Angeles and a peripheral nerve fellowship at Louisiana State University School of Medicine. She also completed a Master of Science program at the Dartmouth Institute for Health Policy and Clinical Science.

Durhams treats craniosynostosis, peripheral nerve and brachial plexus lesions, spina bifida, pediatric brain tumors, hydrocephalus, tethered spinal cord, Chiari 1 malformation, and other conditions.

She also does research and publishes in these areas.
