= Roads & Bridges =

American trade publication

- Type: business magazine
- Format: Paper and online magazine
- Owner: Scranton Gillette Communications
- Language: English
- Headquarters: Arlington Heights, Illinois, USA
- Circulation: 61,000
- ISSN: 8750-9229
- Website: Roads & Bridges

Roads & Bridges magazine is a trade publication serving construction and maintenance professionals and heavy equipment manufacturers. The magazine was created by Scranton Gillette Communications in 1906. It provides industry news, information on relevant equipment and safety recommendations and has been cited in studies of American infrastructure. Roads & Bridges works with associations such as AASHTO, AEM, ESWP and Artba. Content is distributed through print, online, live events, custom media, and webinars.

Roads & Bridges presents multiple annual awards and produces yearly Top 10 Roads and Top 10 Bridges Lists. As of July 2013, Roads & Bridges had 61,000 subscribers for its print edition.
