= Justice Durham =

Justice Durham may refer to:

- Christine M. Durham (born 1945), associate justice of the Utah Supreme Court
- Robert D. Durham (born 1947), associate justice of the Oregon Supreme Court
