= Dublin Township =

Dublin Township may refer to several places in the United States:

- Dublin Township, Swift County, Minnesota
- Dublin Township, Mercer County, Ohio
- Dublin Township, Fulton County, Pennsylvania
- Dublin Township, Huntingdon County, Pennsylvania

== See also ==
- Lower Dublin Township, Pennsylvania, defunct, part of the defunct Dublin Township in Philadelphia County
- Upper Dublin Township, Pennsylvania
