= Durham School (Durham, Arkansas) =

Historic schoolhouse in Durham, Arkansas

- Formerly listed on the U.S. National Register of Historic Places
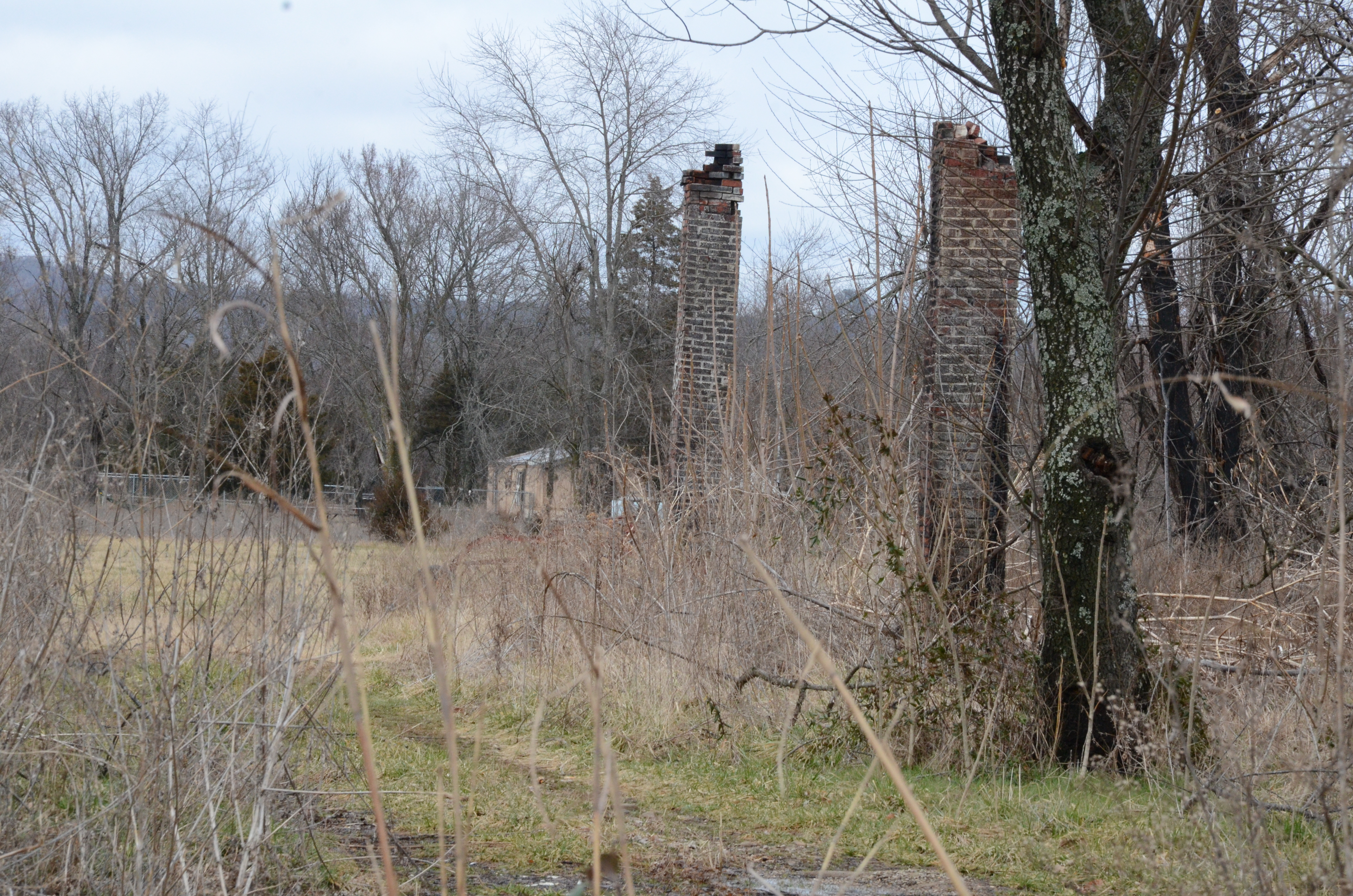
- The chimneys of the school, which was destroyed by arson

- Location within Arkansas Location within the United States
- Location: Co. Rd. 183, Durham, Arkansas
- Coordinates: 35°57′4″N 93°58′48″W
- Architectural style: American Craftsman
- MPS: Public Schools in the Ozarks MPS
- NRHP reference No.: 92001121

Significant dates
- Added to NRHP: September 4, 1992
- Removed from NRHP: January 26, 2018

The Durham School was a historic schoolhouse on Durham Road (County Road 183) in Durham, Arkansas. It was a single-story Craftsman style stone structure, with a gable roof, and entrances at the opposite gable ends. Built in 1829, the school had three classrooms and space for a teacher's living quarters. It was used until the Durham school district was consolidated into that of Elkins in 1948. It was listed on the National Register of Historic Places in 1982. The building has since been destroyed by fire, and was delisted from the Register in 2018.

== See also ==
- National Register of Historic Places listings in Washington County, Arkansas
