= John Oliver (minister) =

Puritan minister

- Born: Abt. 1616, London, United Kingdom
- Emigrated: June 5, 1632 aboard William and Francis
- Died: 1646 Massachusetts Bay Colony
- Education: Harvard College (graduated 1645)
- Known for: Senior sergeant in Capt. John Underhill's Garrison; Member of the Ancient and Honorable Artillery Company; First Minister Rumney Marsh (now Chelsea, Massachusetts)
- Spouse: Elizabeth Newdigate
- Children: John, Elizabeth (married Enoch Wiswall, son of Thomas Wiswall), Hannah, John, Thomas
- Nickname: "The Scholar"

John Oliver (c. 1616, died 1646) was a Puritan minister in the Massachusetts Bay Colony, and one of the earliest graduates of Harvard College (class of 1645). Known as "the Scholar", he served as an early member of Massachusetts General Court in 1637 and as its treasurer and selectman. In 1637, Oliver joined the Ancient and Honorable Artillery Company and was a senior sergeant in Captain John Underhill's garrison at the Castle in Boston Harbor by 1639. Oliver was considered an "expert soldier" in John Winthrop's journal. John Oliver was the First Minister of Rumney Marsh (now Chelsea, Massachusetts).

== Family and early life ==
John Oliver was the son of Thomas Oliver (d. June 1, 1658) who arrived in Boston from London with his wife Ann (d. 1635) and seven children aboard the William and Francis on June 5, 1632. Thomas and Ann's children were:

1. John (b. about 1616, d. 1646)
2. Nathaniel (b. 1619, d. January 9, 1633)
3. James
4. Peter
5. Samuel
6. Abigail (m. James Johnson)
7. unknown daughter (m. Richards Wolfall)
8. Daniel (d. June 1637)

Following Thomas's first wife Ann's death in 1635, he married (2nd) Ann who survived him and died December 20, 1662.

John Oliver was admitted to the First Church in Boston in 1633 when sixteen or seventeen years old. At the May 1634 session of the Massachusetts General Court, "John Ollyver" took the freeman's oath. "By this time the fort at Boston was in defence, and divers pieces of ordnance mounted on it"; and, at the same session, "it was ordered, that there shalbe a ward of two kept duy day att the ffort att Boston, dureing the tyme of any shipps rydeing there, ... to be ordered by Capt. Vnderhill [Underhill]; .. & John Ollyver [was] chosen corporall to the said captaine."

John Oliver married Elizabeth Newdigate (or Newgate), daughter of John Newdigate. John and Elizabeth had the following children:

1. John (bapt. July 29, 1638; d. March 1639)
2. Elizabeth (b. February 28, 1640; m. Enoch Wiswall of Dorchester, Massachusetts son of Thomas Wiswall, November 25, 1657)
3. Hannah (b. March 3, 1642; d.1653)
4. John (b. April 15, 1640)
5. Thomas (b. February 10, 1645–46)

Oliver's widow, Elizabeth, married Edward Jackson of Newton, Massachusetts. She survived Oliver for sixty-three years, and Edward, her second husband, for twenty-eight years. She died March 30, 1709, aged ninety-one.

== Appointment as First Minister at Rumney Marsh ==
In March of 1639-1640, a motion was made by the First Church in Boston "by such as have farms at Rumney Marsh [Chelsea, Massachusetts], that our brother Oliver may be sent to instruct their servants, and to be a help to them, because they cannot many times come hither, nor sometimes to Lynn [Massachusetts], and sometimes nowhere at all." Oliver's father, Thomas, said: "I desire what calling my son hath to such a work, or by what rule of God's word may the church send out any of her members to such as are not of the church." On March 23, the Reverend John Wilson "... made a full statement of the general consent of the church," whereupon "Sergeant Oliver," signified his acceptance of the appointment in the following terms: "I desire to speak a word or two to the business of Rumney Marsh. I am apt to be discouraged in any good work, and I am glad, that there is a universal consent in the hears of the church; for if there should have been variety in their thoughts, or compulsion of their minds, it would have been a great discouragement. But seeing a call of God, I hope I shall employ my weak talent to God's service; and, considering my own youth and feebleness to so great a work, I shall desire my loving brethren to look at me as their brother, to send me out with their constant prayers."

== Controversy and subsequent enrollment at Harvard ==
Despite being a member of the General Court, Oliver was caught up in the Antinomian Controversy having signed a petition in favor of John Wheelwright. He was disarmed and dismissed from his position. Recanting, he “acknowledged his error” and made the significant decision to attend the recently founded Harvard College as a divinity student.

Oliver graduated in the Class of 1645 with Jeremiah Holland, William Ames, John Russell, Samuel Stow, James Ward and Robert Johnson.

== Death ==
John Oliver died of "malignant fever" April 12, 1646 around his thirtieth year of life. On his passing, John Winthrop wrote:

"[the] fever swept away some precious ones amongst us, especially one Mr. John Oliver, a gracious young man, not full thirty years of age, an expert soldier, and excellent surveyor of land, and one who, for the sweetness of his disposition and usefulness through public spirit, was generally beloved and greatly lamented. For some few years past he had given himself up to the ministry of the gospel, and was becoming very hopeful that way (being a good scholar and of able gifts otherwise), and had exercised publicly for two years."

Further, John Hull wrote:

"1646, April 11, died Mr. John Oliver, one of choice parts, endued with variety of able gifts for the generation; but God took him away in his youth, to the saddening of very many godly hearts and threatening of the rising generation."
