= Jane Dubin =

American producer of Broadway plays

- Education: Rochester BS, MS 1979
- Notable work: The Norman Conquests
- Awards: Tony Awards; The Norman Conquests as producer An American in Paris; Ann; Peter the Starcatcher; Lucille Lortel nomination The Absolute Brightness of Leonard Pelkey

Jane Dubin is an American producer of Broadway plays. She won a Tony Award in 2009 for The Norman Conquests, for the Best Broadway Play Revival of 2009. Her productions have won Tony Awards for An American in Paris (2015) as well as Ann and Peter the Starcatcher. She has worked as a board member with the Houses on the Moon theater company. She is president of Double Play Connections. She co-produced The Absolute Brightness of Leonard Pelkey which was nominated at the Lucille Lortel Awards in 2016 for best Solo Show. At age 40, she underwent an abrupt career transformation, going from investment management to the "big, shining lights of Broadway"; she started out by helping with the business end of productions, and gradually became a full-fledged Broadway producer. Dubin is a graduate of the University of Rochester and worked for years as an actuary before becoming a Broadway producer.

== Productions ==
- An American in Paris
- Ann
- The Norman Conquests
- Peter the Starcatcher
- The 39 steps
- The Groundswell
