= Dublin, Belarus =

Dublin Дублін
- Village
- Location in Belarus
- Coordinates: 51°44′N 30°20′E
- Country: Belarus
- Voblast: Gomel Region

Population (2004)
  - Total: 354
- Time zone: UTC+2 (EET)
  - Summer (DST): UTC+3 (EEST)

Dublin (Belarusian: Дублін, Russian: Дублин, Polish: Dublin) is a village in the Gomel Region of Belarus. As of 2004 the population was 354.

== History ==
From the 16th Century onwards, the village was part of the Kniaz Vishnevsky region. In the latter half of the 17th Century, the village became part of the Kniaz Konecpolsky region. The village was owned by Rekicky from 1811 onwards. In 1897, the village had a shop, a school, a bakery, two water mills and a forge.

A school opened in the village on 9 June 1927.

During World War II 83 of the village's inhabitants died. In 1970, a war memorial was built.

Since 1970, the village has been a part of Gagarin's collective farm.
