= Dublin City =

Dublin City may refer to:

- Dublin, the capital of the Republic of Ireland
- Dublin City Council
- Dublin City F.C., association football club in Northside, Dublin
- Dublin City (Parliament of Ireland constituency), a constituency before 1801
- Dublin City (UK Parliament constituency), a constituency between 1801 and 1885

== See also ==
- Dublin (disambiguation)
