= Durhamville =

Durhamville may refer to:

- Durhamville, New York, a hamlet in Oneida County
- Durhamville, Tennessee, an unincorporated community in Lauderdale County
