= Dublin High School =

Dublin High School may refer to:

== United States ==
- Dublin High School (California), in Dublin
- Dublin High School (Georgia), in Dublin
- Dublin Coffman High School, in Dublin, Ohio
- Dublin Jerome High School, in Dublin, Ohio
- Dublin Scioto High School, in Dublin, Ohio
- Dublin School, in Dublin, New Hampshire
- Dublin High School (Texas), in Dublin
- Dublin High School, a former school in Virginia, consolidated into Pulaski County High School in 1974

== Other uses ==
- The High School, Dublin in Ireland

== See also ==
- Upper Dublin High School, in Fort Washington, Pennsylvania
