= Dublin (surname) =

Dublin is a surname. Notable people with the surname include:

- Dion Dublin (born 1969), English television presenter and footballer
- George Dublin (born 1977), Antiguan footballer
- Jared Dublin (born 1992), American association football analyst and scout
- Keith Dublin (born 1966), English footballer
- Louis Israel Dublin (1882–1969), Lithuanian-American statistician
