= HMS Dublin =

Five ships of the Royal Navy have been named HMS Dublin, after the Irish city of Dublin:

- HMS Dublin (1709) was a 10-gun yacht launched in 1707 and broken up in 1752.
- HMS Dublin was to have been a 10-gun yacht. She was renamed HMS Dorset (1753) before her launch in 1753 and was sold in 1815.
- HMS Dublin (1757) was a 74-gun third-rate Dublin-class ship of the line launched in 1757 and broken up in 1784.
- HMS Dublin (1812) was 74-gun third rate launched in 1812. She was reduced to 50 guns in 1826, and was relegated to harbour duties in 1845. She was sold for scrapping in 1885.
- HMS Dublin (1912) was a Town-class light cruiser launched in 1912 and sold for scrapping in 1926.
