= Robert Peele (engineer) =

American mining engineer

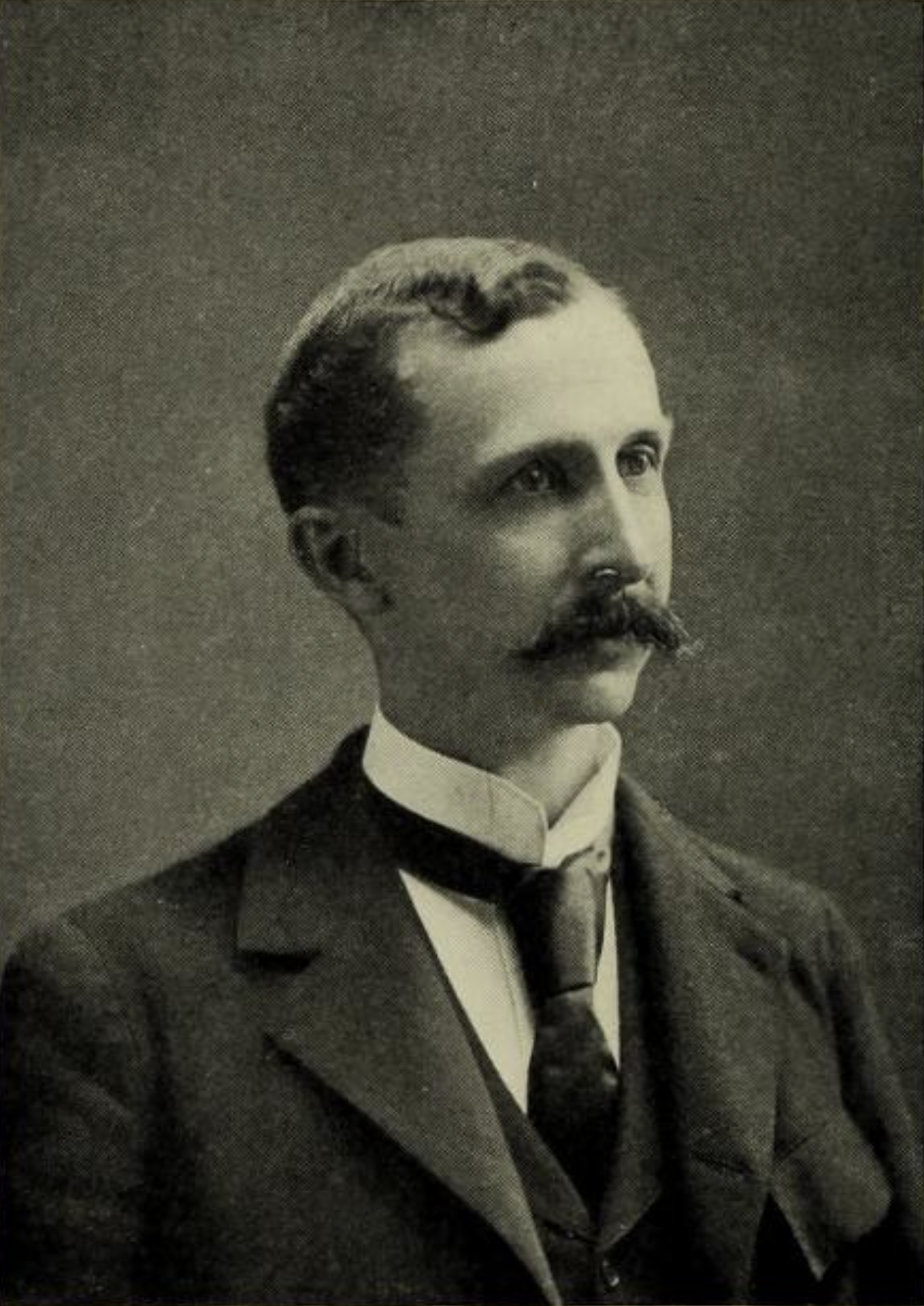
- Born: July 15, 1858; New York City, New York, U.S.
- Died: December 8, 1942 (aged 84)} New York City, New York, U.S.
- Education: Columbia School of Mines
- Occupations: Mining engineer; professor
- Employer: Columbia School of Mines

Robert Peele (July 15, 1858 – December 8, 1942) was an American mining engineer. He was a professor at Columbia University and author of the Mining Engineers' Handbook, which was in print from 1918 to 1989.

== Biography ==
Peele was born on July 15, 1858, in New York City, the son of Raymond and Anne Westervelt Peele. He received the degree of Engineer of Mining from Columbia School of Mines in 1883 and immediately entered the mining business. He worked in gold and silver mines in North Carolina, Arizona, and Colorado, and performed evaluations of mining fields in New Mexico, Colombia, and Dutch Guiana. He served as superintendent of the Oregon Gold Mining Company and engineer of the Peruvian Exploration Syndicate.

Peele became a member of the mining engineering firm of Olcott, Fearn, and Peele. He joined the Columbia University faculty in 1892, and was appointed professor in 1904 and served in that capacity until 1925, becoming professor emeritus. He wrote extensively on mining subjects and was the editor of a popular handbook known as the Mining Engineers' Handbook, which was published in 1918, 1927, and 1941, the third edition of which remained in print until 1989, and was one of the most used mining books of the twentieth century.

Peele died on December 8, 1942, at age 84, in New York City.

Peele was named an honorary member of the American Institute of Mining, Metallurgical, and Petroleum Engineers in 1936. The AIME established the Robert Peele Memorial Award in 1953 "for the most outstanding paper published on behalf of The Mining and Exploration Division by an SME member under the age of 35."

Peele was inducted into the National Mining Hall of Fame in 2004.
