= Dublin, Florida =

Unincorporated community in Florida, U.S.

Coordinates: 28°47′22″N 81°37′36″W

Dublin is an unincorporated community in Lake County, in the U.S. state of Florida.

The community was named after Dublin, in Ireland.
