= Durham, Arkansas =

Unincorporated community in Arkansas, US

Coordinates: 35°56′58″N 93°58′50″W

Durham is an unincorporated community in eastern Washington County, Arkansas, United States. The community is on Arkansas Highway 16 along the White River valley between Elkins to the northwest and Thompson in Madison County to the southeast. Its elevation is 1,247 feet (380 m).

A post office was established at Durham in 1873, and remained in operation until 1967. The Durham School, which is listed on the National Register of Historic Places, was located here.

== Notable person ==
- Sherm Lollar, (1924–1977), All-Star and World Series champion professional baseball player and coach.
