= Kennett, California =

Former copper mining town in California, U.S.

Coordinates: 40°44′30″N 122°24′27″W

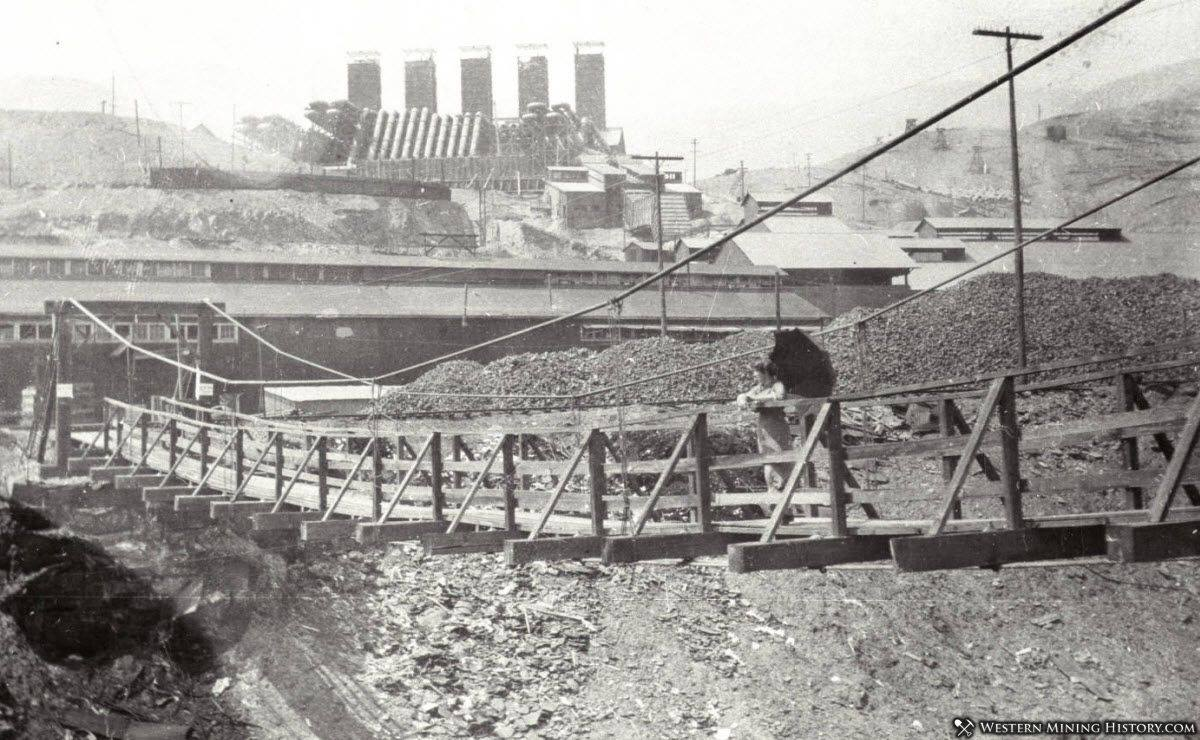
Foot bridge across the Sacramento River to the Mammoth Smelter, Kennett ca. 1910.

Kennett was an important copper mining town in northern California, United States until it was flooded by Shasta Lake while Shasta Dam was being constructed. Kennett is submerged under approximately 400 ft. of water (depending on the lake level). It was the largest, most important mining town in the area outside of Redding and Shasta.

== Early history ==
Prior to settlement by Euro-Americans, the land around Kennett was home to nine major groups of Wintu, living in approximately 250 villages. The Wintu name for the Kennett site was Munuktsiraw. They first came into contact with Europeans some time in the early 19th century, in the form of fur-trappers and traders. By 1835 it is estimated that 75% of their population had been decimated by diseases from contact with whites and Mexicans.

The first Anglo-American settler in the area was Pearson Reading, who was given a land grant by the Mexican government in 1843. Rather than drive the Native Americans out, as was commonly done at the time, Reading befriended them and taught them agricultural skills. Shasta County was created in 1850, and by 1852 large numbers of settlers had begun to arrive in search of gold and other precious ore. After the Wintoon War of 1858-59, almost all Wintu were either dead or forced onto reservations. The first recorded mention of the Kennett site was in an article from the Daily Alta California dated June 7, 1852, announcing that gold had been discovered in Backbone Creek, which became the location of Kennett. One of the first Anglo-American men to settle in this location was John Sisk, who arrived in June 1857 via the Lassen Trail.

Besides mining, Kennett also grew as a result of railroad construction. Colonel James Scobie established a railroad camp near Kennett, which resulted in a number of businessmen opening shops nearby to cater to the needs of the railroad workers. When the railroad was complete, it became the most important factor in Kennett's growth.

== Founding ==
Sometime during the construction of the railroad, the settlement on Backbone Creek was named Kennet in honor of a railroad-man "Squire" Kennet. Little else is known about him, and there are no official records related to him. At some point, the town of Kennet began to be spelled Kennett, possibly through the mistake of a mapmaker.

In 1884, 24-year-old Charley Golinsky arrived in Kennett with the intention of opening a store to serve the miners in the area. Golinsky's store quickly became the most important in town, and was even used as a polling place in 1886. His store also became the Kennett post office, and Golinsky was elected postmaster. After expanding his store to include a hotel, he brought his extended family to Kennett, and they became the town's most prominent family.

The two largest mines in the area were the Mammoth and Golinsky mines. They contained extremely pure copper ore, and brought great wealth to the small town. Parts of these mines are still above water, but can only be accessed by hiking through dense foliage or up a steep embankment from the lake. Also, measures have been taken to seal off the mines due to safety concerns.

== World War I and the Depression ==
Kennett continued to prosper, and saw an economic boom during World War I brought on by the increase in metal prices. The end of the war contributed to an economic depression for the town, as the expanded mines, smelters, and railroad lines were too large to be supported by a peacetime economy. The largest mine in Kennett, the Mammoth mine, closed permanently in 1923, devastating the local economy. In 1931, Kennett was disincorporated, as the population had dropped below the level required to be an incorporated city.

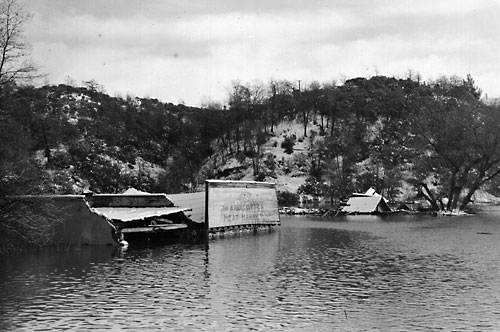
Downtown Kennett being enveloped by the lake

== Shasta Dam and the end of Kennett ==
The federal government had considered building a dam in the area since the 1870s, and the New Deal gave them the perfect opportunity to do so. In 1935, construction on Shasta Dam began. There is no record of any public hearings to ask Kennett residents their opinion. The diminished population of the town was likely considered too insignificant to matter. Most people sold their land to the government willingly, while some waited until the waters began to rise before abandoning their homes. Kennett was completely submerged by 1944, one year before the completion of the dam.
