= Scranton Gillette Communications =

Scranton Gillette Communications, Inc.
- Founded: 1905
- Founder: Halbert Powers Gillette
- Country of origin: United States
- Headquarters location: Arlington Heights, Illinois, USA
- Key people: Edward Gillette, CEO
- Publication types: Paper and online magazine
- Nonfiction topics: business-to-business communications
- Official website: ScrantonGillette.com

Scranton Gillette Communications, Inc. is a business-to-business communications company founded in 1905. Originally, the company was established to serve the transportation construction industry, and the publication Roads & Bridges, started in 1906, continues to be published today. Currently, 20 regular publications are produced by Scranton Gillette. These cover building and construction, healthcare, horticulture, the water industry, infrastructure (e.g. roads and bridges), home furnishings and music.

Ed Gillette is the current CEO of Scranton Gillette Communications, Inc. He is the great-grandson of the company's founder, Halbert Powers Gillette, who was named as one of the “Top 100 Private Sector Transportation Construction Professionals of the 20th Century” by the ARTBA Transportation Development Foundation (ARTBA-TDF).
