= John Durham (Medal of Honor) =

John Stafford Durham
- Born: June 8, 1843; New York City, US
- Died: January 12, 1918 (aged 74)
- Military career
- Allegiance: United States; Union
- Branch: United States Army; Union Army
- Service years: 1861 - 1864
- Rank: Sergeant
- Unit: 1st Wisconsin Volunteer Infantry Regiment (3 Years)
- Conflicts: American Civil War; Battle of Perryville
- Awards: Medal of Honor

John Stafford Durham (a.k.a. Mark Cromwell, June 8, 1843 – January 12, 1918) served in the Union Army during the American Civil War. He received the Medal of Honor for his actions during the Battle of Perryville.

== Biography ==
Durham was born on June 8, 1843, in New York City, the son of Amos H. Durham and Mary Ann née Laken. He ran away from home at age seven and was adopted by a showman, who changed his name to Mark Cromwell. Durham's official residence was Malone, Wisconsin when he joined the Union Army. He joined the 1st Wisconsin Infantry in August 1861, and mustered out in October 1864. During the Battle of Perryville he took over as the flag bearer for his regiment when the color sergeant was shot. He moved forward with the flag until he was ordered to stop midway by his commanding officer. Durham was admitted to the Soldiers' Home in Leavenworth, Kansas in 1902; he died there on January 12, 1918 and was buried at Leavenworth National Cemetery in Leavenworth.

== Medal of Honor citation ==
Rank and organization: Sergeant, Company F, 1st Wisconsin Infantry. Place and date: At Perryville, Ky., 8 October 1862. Entered service at: Malone, Fond du Lac County, Wis. Born: 1843, New York, N.Y. Date of issue: 20 November 1896.

Citation:

For extraordinary heroism on 8 October 1862, while serving with Company F, 1st Wisconsin Infantry, in action at Perryville, Kentucky. Sergeant Durham seized the flag of his regiment when the color sergeant was shot and advanced with the flag midway between the lines, amid a shower of shot, shell, and bullets, until stopped by his commanding officer.

== See also ==
- List of Medal of Honor recipients
- List of American Civil War Medal of Honor recipients: A–F
