= John Stephens Durham =

African-American journalist and author

John S. Durham
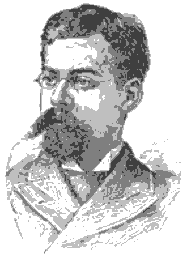

United States Minister Resident to Haiti
- In office July 30, 1891 – November 7, 1893
- Preceded by: Frederick Douglass
- Succeeded by: Henry M. Smythe

Personal details
- Born: July 18, 1861 Philadelphia, Pennsylvania
- Died: October 17, 1919 (aged 58) London, England
- Spouse: Constance Mackenzie (m. 1897)
- Occupation: Writer; lawyer; engineer; diplomat

John Stephens Durham (1861–1919) was a teacher, journalist, author, attorney, civil engineer, and diplomat who served as United States Minister Resident to Haiti. He was African-American. He also served in Cuba where he established a law practice and had a sugar plantation.

== Family ==
John S. Durham was born on July 18, 1861, in Philadelphia, Pennsylvania, to Elizabeth Stephens and John Durham, whose brothers helped establish the African Methodist Episcopal Church. Durham's grandfather purportedly took part in Nat Turner's Rebellion. In 1897 Durham married Constance Mackenzie, a white woman who was superintendent of the Philadelphia kindergarten schools, and they had two sons.

== Education ==
Due to his father's early death, Durham worked when he was young while attending the Philadelphia public schools. He graduated from the Institute for Colored Youth on Bainbridge Street and then served as a teacher and principal at various schools in Pennsylvania, Delaware, and New Jersey. Durham then attended and graduated from the University of Pennsylvania in 1886 with a bachelor of science degree. While a student he played football and edited The Daily Pennsylvanian and also wrote for The Times.

After graduation, Durham attended and graduated from a University of Pennsylvania graduate program in civil engineering in 1888 and also attended the University of Pennsylvania Law School in 1887-88 but did not graduate. He worked for the Philadelphia Bulletin for several years after graduation.

== Career ==
In 1891 Republican President Benjamin Harrison appointed Durham to replace Frederick Douglass as United States Minister Resident to Haiti and U.S. Charge d'Affaires to Santo Domingo. He served from July 30, 1891, to November 7, 1893.

After the ambassadorship, Durham studied and passed the bar exam in 1895, and then returned in 1896 to Santo Domingo to manage a sugar plantation for four years. In 1902 President Theodore Roosevelt appointed Durham as assistant U.S. Attorney with the Spanish Treaty Claims Commission in Cuba where he served until 1910. He also maintained a large private law practice in Cuba and owned sugar plantations, leaving a large estate upon his death. Durham authored the novel Diane, Priestess of Haiti (1902) and the monograph To Teach the Negro History: a suggestion (1887).

John Stephens Durham died in London on October 17, 1919.
