= Lego Star Wars: The Freemaker Adventures =

American animated television series

- Promotional poster
- Genre: Action comedy; Science fiction
- Based on: Star Wars by George Lucas
- Developed by: Bill Motz; Bob Roth; Carrie Beck; Jason Cosler; Jake Blais; John McCormack; Keith Malone; Leland Chee
- Voices of: Nicolas Cantu; Vanessa Lengies; Eugene Byrd; Matthew Wood; Grey Griffin
- Composers: Michael Kramer; (Based on themes by John Williams)
- Country of origin: United States
- Original language: English
- No. of seasons: 2
- No. of episodes: 26

Production
- Executive producers: Bill Motz; Bob Roth; Torsten Jacobson; Jill Wilfert; Erik Wilstrup
- Producers: Carrie Beck; Jake Blais; Jason Cosler; John McCormack; Irene Sparre
- Running time: 22 minutes
- Production companies: Wil Film ApS; Lucasfilm; The Lego Group

Original release
- Network: Disney XD
- Release: June 20, 2016 – August 16, 2017

Related
- Lego Star Wars: The Yoda Chronicles; Lego Star Wars: Droid Tales; Lego Star Wars: The Resistance Rises

Lego Star Wars: The Freemaker Adventures is an animated television series that is based on the Lego Star Wars theme, and premiered on Disney XD on June 20, 2016. Disney XD announced that it had renewed the series for a second season on April 3, 2017. A new series of five shorts debuted on May 4, with the second season premiering airing on June 17, 2017; the series' final episode aired on August 16, 2017. A follow-up series, Lego Star Wars: All-Stars, aired in 2018.

== Overview ==
Set between Star Wars: Episode V – The Empire Strikes Back and Star Wars: Episode VI – Return of the Jedi, The Freemaker Adventures centers on a family of three siblings — Rowan, Kordi, and Zander Freemaker — and their ex-battle droid companion R0-GR, who salvage parts from destroyed or damaged ships in order to build new ones, which they sell from their workshop aboard a space station known as the Wheel.

During the first season, the Freemakers inadvertently become caught in the conflict between Galactic Empire and the Rebel Alliance when Rowan discovers his connection to the Force and part of an ancient artifact known as the Kyber Saber. Aided by a Force-wielder named Naare, the Freemakers embark on a journey to uncover the mystery of the Kyber Saber, which leads them to meet new and old Lego faces from the Star Wars universe.

In the second season, the Freemakers join the Rebel Alliance and attempt to build the Arrowhead, a kyber crystal-powered ship which Rowan saw in a vision and is supposedly the key to defeating the Empire. During this time, they are pursued by MO-C, a droid built by the Emperor for the sole purpose of capturing Rowan, and Darth Vader, who is also looking for kyber crystals to power the Empire's new battle station: the Death Star II.

== Cast and characters ==
=== Main ===
- Nicolas Cantu as Rowan Freemaker, the young 12-year-old Force-sensitive member of the family who often has trouble with paying attention to his older siblings and other authority figures. Once trained in the use of the Force, he begins to use it constructively, thus becoming a successor of an ancient group of Jedi known as Force-Builders. His special sensitivity to kyber crystals make him a target for several nefarious adversaries throughout the series, including Emperor Palpatine and Graballa the Hutt.
- Vanessa Lengies as Kordi Freemaker, the responsible, money-conscious middle sibling of the family who is fiercely protective of her younger brother Rowan and disapproves of his involvement in the quest for the Kyber Saber.
- Eugene Byrd as Zander Freemaker, the eldest son of the family and a mechanic who specializes in creating new ships and devices from leftover components. He hates his creations being called "Uglies", preferring the term "Z-Wings", and has a weakness for pretty ladies, including Naare (until learning that she is working for the Empire), Rebel pilot Lt. Valeria, and Becky Smoochenbacher (voiced by Dove Cameron), a resident of the Wheel.
- Matthew Wood as R0-GR (pronounced Roger), a battle droid and veteran of the Clone Wars who was salvaged by the Freemakers and reprogrammed to be their servant and friend.

=== Recurring ===
==== The Empire ====
- Grey Griffin as Naare, a dark side user and self-proclaimed Sith in the service of Emperor Palpatine who is masquerading as a Jedi survivor of Order 66 to fool and use the Freemakers in her mission to find the Kyber Saber crystals. She has a set of facial markings that change shape and color along with her eyes when she becomes angry or taps into the dark side.
- Matt Sloan as Darth Vader, a Sith Lord, Emperor Palpatine's apprentice and chief enforcer, and the most feared man in the galaxy.
- Trevor Devall as Emperor Palpatine, the ruler of the Empire and Darth Vader's Sith master.
- Richard Kind as Durpin, a cowardly Imperial officer who is introduced as a lieutenant commander but soon promoted to general by the Emperor. Durpin is fully aware of the perils of high rank in the Empire and seeks to avoid it at all cost. After each failure to capture the Freemakers, he is relocated to another Empire-controlled planet which happens to be visited by the Freemakers in short order, causing him yet another humiliating defeat.
- Jeff Bennett as Plumestriker, Durpin's second-in-command who lacks his superior's healthy fear of the perils of being in a command position in the Empire and is eager for Durpin to climb the Imperial ladder. In the second season he becomes more independent-minded and more willing to capture the Freemakers than Durpin in order to finally escape his continual penalty assignments.
- Jane Leeves as Lieutenant Estoc, an Imperial officer assigned to the Wheel who participates in the hunt for Luke and Leia when they arrive at the station looking for repairs.

==== Hutts ====
- Dana Snyder as Graballa the Hutt, a Hutt crime lord and Jabba's envious cousin who is constantly kept from pursuing his own ambitions by Jabba's greater influence and who seeks the kyber crystals as a means of gaining power. He is 462 years old, and has spent 200 of them running a mining operation in an asteroid field, nursing his dreams of running a beach resort. He eventually joins forces with Naare so that the pair can recover the crystals together until she betrays Graballa. In the second season, he is drafted by Darth Vader to locate more kyber crystals to complete the second Death Star.
- Kevin Michael Richardson as Jabba the Hutt, the biggest Hutt crime lord in the galaxy and Graballa's cousin who is often annoyed by his antics. Unlike Graballa, who speaks in Galactic Basic (English), Jabba speaks in Huttese.

==== Bounty Hunters ====
- James Patrick Stuart as Dengar, a bounty hunter in Graballa's employ who is best known for not being as feared as Boba Fett. In this series, his trademark head wrappings occasionally serve him as an improvised utility tool (parachute, rappelling rope, etc.).
- John DiMaggio and Danny Jacobs as Baash and Raam, a pair of idiotic Iktotchi in the employ of Graballa the Hutt who are constant thorns in his and Dengar's side due to their incompetence.
- Dee Bradley Baker as Boba Fett, a notorious bounty hunter wearing Mandalorian armor in the employ of Jabba the Hutt who is old friends with Dengar. Baker also provides various additional voices such as Ben Quadinaros.

==== Rebel Alliance ====
- Billy Dee Williams as Lando Calrissian, the former Administrator of Cloud City turned general in the Rebel Alliance. He works with Chewbacca in the absence of Han Solo.
- Eric Bauza as Luke Skywalker, an X-wing pilot in the Rebel Alliance and Jedi-in-training. As The Freemaker Adventures takes place after The Empire Strikes Back, Luke appears in his attire from Return of the Jedi and wields his green lightsaber.
- Julie Dolan as Princess Leia Organa, the princess of the now-destroyed planet of Alderaan and a leader in the Rebel Alliance.
- Trevor Devall as Admiral Ackbar, the Mon Calamari fleet admiral of the Rebel Alliance.
- Yvette Nicole Brown as Lt. Colvett Valeria, a fighter pilot for the Rebel Alliance. (season 2)
- Vanessa Marshall as Hera Syndulla, a Twi'Lek pilot and general in the Rebel Alliance. Her droid Chopper also appears. (season 2)
- Corey Burton as Quarrie, an elderly Mon Calamari and an experienced ship builder and mechanic, responsible for the creation of the B-Wing in Star Wars: Rebels, who becomes Rowan's mentor. (season 2)

==== Force-users ====
- Brian Dobson as Jek-14, also known as the Maker of Zoh, a former Sith experiment who now tries to avoid any form of conflict and uses the Force to build. Jek first appeared in Lego Star Wars: The Yoda Chronicles and its sequel series Lego Star Wars: The New Yoda Chronicles, and in The Freemaker Adventures is seen in his elderly appearance from the latter.
- Trevor Devall as Baird Kantoo, a Jedi Knight who created the Kyber Saber. After discovering how destructive the Kyber Saber is, he smashed it and gave each piece to trusted Jedi Knights to hide them in different areas around the galaxy to keep it out of evil's hand.

==== Droids ====
- French Stewart as N3-R0, a droid who hates humans due to their mistreatment of droids.
- Fred Tatasciore as BL-OX, a large droid loyal to Jek but influenced by N3-R0.
- James Urbaniak as M-OC, an Imperial hunting droid, who is assigned by Palpatine to hunt down Rowan Freemaker. He sports a versatile arsenal wielded by hand or installed into his body, including a pair of red lightsabers. M-OC and Darth Vader quickly become bitter rivals for the Emperor's favor as they repeatedly let the Freemakers slip through their grasp. (season 2)

==== Civilians ====
- Thomas Lennon as Wick Cooper, a wealthy resident of the Wheel space station who occasionally comes to the Freemakers to have them work on his vehicles. Very full of himself and proud of his station, he is quite willing to bully the Freemakers (particularly Zander) and others whom he regards as beneath him. He is also an insensitive individual, once making a joke at the expense of the destroyed planet Alderaan in the presence of Princess Leia. He is also the Emperor's self-proclaimed biggest fan. After the Freemakers are forced to leave their shop, he turns it into an expensive but lucrative café.
- Jeff Bennett as Ignacio Wortan, a Twi'lek businessman.
- Greg Baldwin as Furlac, the Freemakers' merciless Aqualish landlord aboard the Wheel space station. He is constantly threatening to throw the Freemakers out if they don't pay rent on their shop in time, but notably is susceptible to Force persuasion as employed by Naare. In the second season, he becomes an ally to Graballa.
- Danny Jacobs as Yeppau, a Toydarian who acts as Graballa's yes-man. A running gag in the show involves him frequently, though not exclusively, responding to Graballa's inquiries with "Yep".
- Jim Cummings as Hondo Ohnaka, a notorious Weequay pirate who led the Ohnaka Gang during the Clone Wars.
- Grey Griffin as Maz Kanata, an ex-pirate and -smuggler and current bar owner on Takodana.

== Episodes ==
=== Series overview ===
Season	Episodes	Originally released	
Season	Episodes	First released	Last released
1	13	June 20, 2016	August 29, 2016
2	13	June 17, 2017	August 16, 2017

=== Season 1 (2016) ===
No. overall	No. in season	Title	Directed by	Written by	Original release date	Prod. code	U.S. viewers (millions)
1	1	"A Hero Discovered"	Michael Hegner	Bill Motz & Bob Roth	June 20, 2016	101	0.51
During a briefing on the creation of the second Death Star seen in Return of the Jedi, Darth Vader explains to an unimpressed Emperor that they have come across information in the Jedi Archives regarding the mysterious Kyber Saber. Elsewhere, the Freemaker family of ship salvagers are gathering parts in the middle of a space battle, until youngest boy Rowan inadvertently destroys an Imperial transport. Returning to their home, the space station "The Wheel", the three find themselves in urgent need of funds to pay off their landlord Furlac, and head to a planet on which a Clone Wars battle took place in order to find a needed part to repair one of Zander's "Z-Wings" and sell it. Despite being told to stay on the Star Scavenger with Roger the salvaged battle droid, Rowan leaves the ship to warn his siblings Zander and Kordi of stormtrooper activity in the area only to experience a strange call that leads him to the hilt of the Kyber Saber. He is then greeted by Naare, who explains that the Kyber Saber is the first lightsaber, which was broken and scattered in order to keep its vast powers out of evil hands. The pair then work together to rescue Kordi and Zander from the Imperials, and Naare accompanies the Freemakers back to The Wheel where she uses the Force to get Furlac off their back for the time being while also renting a shop on the station for her own use. Unbeknownst to the Freemakers, however, their new "ally" is a Sith in the employ of the Emperor, who seeks to exploit Rowan's newfound connection to the Force only so that she can recover the fragments of the Kyber Saber for her master.
2	2	"The Mines of Graballa"	Martin Skov	James W. Bates	June 21, 2016	102	0.26
Kordi frowns on Naare's efforts to train Rowan, who doesn't want her younger brother getting involved in such dangerous activities. Naare then tries to use the Mind Trick ability on Kordi, but it has no effect on her. Rowan is determined to help out and tricks Roger into helping him take a ship out in search of another Kyber Saber crystal, which they find in an asteroid belt. The belt is run by Graballa the Hutt, whose men bring the pair to him after they recover the crystal. Alerted to the importance of the artifact, Graballa demands Rowan tell him how to find the rest of its pieces and threatens to feed him to his pet if he refuses. Zander, Kordi, and Naare arrive to rescue the pair, and after a harrowing encounter manage to do so. The Kyber Saber crystal is lost in the belt but then recovered, while Graballa sets his minions on the hunt for the Freemakers in order to obtain the crystals for himself.
3	3	"Zander's Joyride"	Per Düring Risager	Russ Carney & Ron Corcillo	June 22, 2016	103	0.36
Wealthy client Wick Cooper brings his classic N-1 Naboo Starfighter to the Freemakers, and the starstruck Zander defies Kordi's wishes by stealing the ship and taking it on a joy ride that lands him in Imperial custody. With the somewhat reluctant aid of Naare, Zander's siblings board the ship in order to rescue their brother and the fighter while Roger distracts their client. Believing the Freemakers to be Rebels, Darth Vader attempts to interrogate Zander and later holds him and his siblings captive until he sees the N-1 and, between his own love of ships and the nostalgia of his piloting one in Star Wars: Episode I – The Phantom Menace, takes off on a ride in the craft himself. The Freemakers are able to trick the Imperials and recover the fighter, but it is left badly damaged and Cooper infuriated until he spots Zander's pride and joy, the Blazemaster, sitting in the shop. Taking the ship as recompense for damages, Cooper flies out only to be left adrift when the incomplete ship explodes.
4	4	"The Lost Treasure of Cloud City"	Michael Hegner	John Behnke	June 23, 2016	104	0.44
During the evacuation of Cloud City as seen in The Empire Strikes Back, Lobot is captured while attempting to recover "precious cargo" from Lando's quarters. Some time later, Rowan is struggling with moving objects using the Force, and Zander tries to cheer him up by taking him to the Wheel's lower ring. While there Rowan meets Lando who is offering a reward to anyone who can recover the cargo from Cloud City, and Kordi quickly agrees to the mission. However, Dengar and his bumbling partners Baash and Raam have also learned of the mission, while Naare comes to suspect that the Freemakers may have learned of her allegiance to the Empire and are gathering the Kyber Saber Crystals without her. The three parties soon arrive on Cloud City, and Rowan ends up frozen in carbonite while Kordi is retrieving the package. A chase soon ensues as Dengar and co. seize Lando's case-which they and Naare believe contains a Kyber Saber Crystal-and the frozen Rowan, leading Zander to a desperate plan: damaging Cloud City's repulsorlift systems so that the city begins to plummet into the depths of Bespin. They manage to free Rowan, and after being freed from the carbonite he is able-due to not being able to rely on his eyesight-to use the Force to repair the repulsorlift system and get the city back to its proper altitude. Lando soon rewards the Freemakers for retrieving the cargo–his much-longed-for wardrobe–while Dengar's crew are imprisoned on Cloud City but now know the identities of the Freemakers.
5	5	"Peril on Kashyyyk"	Jens Møller	David Shayne	June 27, 2016	105	N/A
Due to business being slow and their rent being due in a matter of days, the Freemakers accept a dangerous mission: obtaining a wood panel for a Twi'lek businessman's starship that can only be obtained from Kashyyyk, the Wookiee homeworld under Imperial blockade. Despite Rowan's insistence that he can speak Wookiee, Kordi wants a translation droid, but settles for installing a translation program in Roger after learning what a real protocol droid costs. Their attempt to sneak in earns the attention of Lieutenant Commander Durpin, who is eager to keep the matter quiet so as not to draw attention to himself and risk getting promoted. After meeting party of Wookiees, the Freemakers receive the wood but then learn that they must free the son of the Wookiee chief from a Trandoshan prison in exchange. Despite some hiccups they succeed, but Rowan then senses the presence of a Kyber Saber Crystal inside the prison and insists on going after it despite the Wookiees starting their attack. The Freemakers manage to recover the crystal but the wood panel is damaged in their escape, while Durpin's failure to stop them is blamed on his lack of resources, leading to his reassignment and promotion to the rank of general.
6	6	"Crossing Paths"	Martin Skov	Bill Motz & Bob Roth	July 11, 2016	106	0.49
Wick Cooper has brought his speeder bike to the Freemakers for repairs, even though they previously destroyed his N-1 Starfighter. Naare leaves on secret mission, after reminding Rowan he is forbidden from exposing his Force-sensitivity to anyone, just before Rebel fugitives Luke Skywalker and Leia Organa arrive at the Wheel with a damaged Y-wing, having just escaped from an Imperial patrol. When Imperial officer Estoc announces to the station that the fugitives are on the station, Roger accidentally launches the Star Scavenger with Luke and Rowan on board. Leia coaxes Kordi into not revealing her presence with a promise of paying five times the price of the Y-wing's repairs. With Leia concealed in a garbage container, the Freemakers attempt to smuggle her past the Stormtroopers, but the suspicious Estoc forces them to dump the garbage in the incinerator. Meanwhile, Luke is able to stop the Star Scavenger which crash-lands on Felucia. They make repairs, but an acklay has taken possession of the hyperdrive. Discovering the native plants bloom when the Force is used near them, Luke and Rowan distract the acklay and recover the hyperdrive. Back on the Wheel, Kordi and Zander have rescued the princes from the garbage chute. Zander knocks out the stormtroopers while Kordi and Leia escape to the Upper Ring where they accidentally hide in Cooper's quarters. They briefly convince him they are his cleaning crew, but stormtroopers are alerted, sending the girls back on the run. On Coruscant, Naare meets with the Emperor, who chides her for her failure to quickly find the parts of the Kyber Saber. Kordi and Leia hide in a diner, where Kordi is caught, but Leia attacks the troopers and Estoc to keep Kordi from being arrested. Zander arrives in the nick on Cooper's speeder bike. The Y-wing leaves the station, and is destroyed by Imperial TIEs, but it was only a decoy. The Freemakers convince Estoc that Leia forced them to help her. Roger, Rowan and Luke return; with the Y-wing destroyed, Luke and Leia take one of Zander's Z-wings to resume their voyage.Sometime later, a frustrated Naare returns as well. Rowan presents her with a flower from Felucia, that immediately wilts. Suspicions revolving around the Jedi's true nature begin to click for the boy.
7	7	"Race on Tatooine"	Frederik Budolph	David Shayne	July 18, 2016	107	0.52
Dengar, Baash, and Raam escape from prison on Cloud City and report to Graballa, who had just made another failed attempt to convince Jabba to let him open a resort. Rowan is troubled by the revelations of last episode and fears that Naare is a villain, but is unable to tell his siblings due to their concern over their cash flow. Podracing champion Ben Quadinaros then approaches the family about serving as his pit crew in a race on Tattooine, but it turns out to be a setup by Graballa. The Freemakers are able to escape on a stolen Podracer after Jabba arrives to investigate Graballa's presence, but end up stuck in the desert after the podrace leads to the destruction of their vehicle. They manage to take refuge in an abandoned Jawa sandcrawler, and the elder siblings contact Naare despite Rowan's half-hearted attempts to convince them not to do so. Graballa's forces arrive and attack, and are about to capture the Freemakers when Naare arrives and overcomes them with relative ease. During the battle, however, Rowan hides in her Eclipse Fighter and discovers her red-bladed lightsaber and dark side connection when the Emperor calls to check on her progress. The elder Freemakers are more convinced than ever of Naare's "heroic" nature, leaving Rowan at a loss as to how to deal with the deceiving Sith.
8	8	"The Test"	Michael Hegner	Bill Motz & Bob Roth	July 25, 2016	108	0.45
Rowan reveals to the other Freemakers that Naare is a Sith, and the group manage to escape her after being pursued by her in the Eclipse Fighter, though the Star Scavenger is badly damaged. Naare ends up making a deal with Graballa to hunt down the Freemakers and the crystals together, while the Freemakers crash land on Takodana, home to Maz Kanata. They lightly damage the ship of pirate Hondo Ohnaka, who is convinced to spare the Freemakers harm in exchange for them retrieving three golden orbs from one of Takodana's moons. Rowan, to his surprise, senses a Kyber Saber Crystal in Maz's castle, but assumes that he is imagining things and accompanies his siblings and Roger to the moon. They find that the orbs are in a pit surrounded by adult Varactyls, giant carnivorous lizards, and resort to lowering Roger into the pit from their smaller ship while the creatures are asleep. Roger wakes the creatures up after attempting to take more than Hondo's requested three orbs, and Rowan then discovers that the golden objects are Varactyl eggs. The group then return and confront Hondo over his dirty deal, and Maz then kicks Hondo out before gifting the Freemakers with a needed piece for their ship and another Kyber Saber Crystal. She then advises Rowan that, when things become desperate, he should seek out the Maker of Zoh.
9	9	"The Kyber Saber Crystal Chase"	Jens Møller	Russ Carney & Ron Corcillo	August 1, 2016	109	0.44
The Freemakers continue to search for the Kyber Saber Crystals while being pursued by Naare, and lose one on a water planet before traveling to Naboo, where they discover one hidden in the Emperor Palpatine Museum. Sneaking Roger into the museum, they find that Durpin and Plumestriker are in charge of security. The contents of the museum prove distracting to the various members of the Freemaker family, and Rowan accidentally causes the Imperials to become aware of their presence. He is able to bluff his way into getting the Imperials to leave, only for Naare and Dengar to arrive in search of the crystal that Rowan has found. Roger and Dengar engage in a fire fight while Rowan battles Naare, only to find himself greatly out matched for his former master. He manages to bring down the museum and recovers Naare's blue lightsaber after she steals back her red lightsaber and gets the crystal from him, and the Freemakers escape. The Freemakers then learn that Naare has been using Roger to track them; Naare, learning of their discovery, is unconcerned, as the final crystal is known to be located on Hoth.
10	10	"The Maker of Zoh"	Per Düring Risager	James W. Bates	August 8, 2016	110	0.44
Realizing that Naare will be waiting for them on Hoth and has six of the seven Kyber Saber Crystals, the Freemakers ponder their next move after removing Roger's transmitter, which has been communicating to Naare since they contacted her from Tattooine. Remembering Maz's counsel, Rowan suggests that they travel to Zoh in search of the Maker; despite Zoh turning out to be a supposedly uninhabited junk planet, the group decides to go there. Upon arrival they find several cobbled together droids who attempt to drive them away only for them to be saved by the Maker, who is revealed to be Jek-14; Rowan then persuades him to teach him what he knows of building with the Force. Jek's droid companions become fearful that the Freemakers will take Jek with them and scheme to turn Roger to their side and destroy the unwanted interlopers; however, Roger proves faithful to his "family" and reactivates his transmitter, which brings Naare and Graballa to Zoh in search of the Freemakers. Jek confronts Naare while the Freemakers escape and is buried in junk; however, after the Freemakers and their enemies depart for Hoth, his hand is seen emerging from the pile as his droid friends rebuild.
11	11	"Showdown on Hoth"	Frederik Budolph	John Behnke	August 15, 2016	111	0.34
The Freemakers fly to Hoth with Naare and Graballa's forces hot on their tails, but are able to land safely on the planet while Graballa's ship crashes. Roger causes the Star Scavenger to sink after thawing out a frozen lake, while the Freemakers encounter a baby Wampa before finding the last Kyber Saber Crystal. With their ship frozen the Freemakers are forced to enter Echo Base, where their old enemies Durpin and Plumestriker are now stationed, and Plumestriker inadvertently alerts Naare to the Freemakers' location while trying to capture them and secure promotions for himself and Durpin. However, the Wampa's mother arrives just in time to see the Imperials firing at her cub, and chases them off while the Freemakers are left to prepare for Naare's imminent arrival. Using their tools and Rowan's Force abilities, they repair some of the Rebel and Imperial technology left behind on the planet and fight against the arriving forces, unexpectedly freeing the Star Scavenger from the frozen lake in the process. Kordi shoots down Naare only for her to cause an avalanche with her Force powers and capture them, only to be knocked down when Durpin and Plumestriker come running by with the Wampa still in hot pursuit. Rowan briefly ponders surrendering to Naare in exchange for his family's safety, but instead tricks her with an ice crystal that melts when Naare attempts to form the Kyber Saber, enabling the Freemakers to escape with the real one. However, Rowan then takes Roger and the family salvage pod and leaves in order to protect his older siblings from Naare's continued pursuit.
12	12	"Duel of Destiny"	Jens Møller	Bill Motz & Bob Roth	August 22, 2016	112	0.46
The Emperor continues to demand that Naare hand over the Kyber Saber Crystals as she and Graballa search for the Freemakers; meanwhile, Kordi and Zander search for Rowan to no avail. The youngest member of the Freemakers has secluded himself on an unknown planet with Roger, using the battle droid's recorded memories of Clone Wars Jedi to learn new lightsaber techniques. Giving up on finding Rowan and resigning themselves to him finding them, Kordi and Zander decided to return to the Wheel only to be overheard by one of Graballa's spies, who informs the villains; they then ambush the pair on the wheel. Naare subjects the pair to individually tailored tortures-ripping apart Zander's ships with the Force and destroying Kordi' credits-in order to lure in Rowan, who senses their pain and leaves the last crystal on the planet before flying to their rescue. Arriving on the Wheel, he engages Naare in a full-on duel while the freed Kordi and Zander battle Graballa and his bounty hunters; though he performs well, Naare overpowers him and learns that Roger knows the location of the last crystal. Removing the battle droid's head, she then double crosses Graballa before burying Rowan under a pile of ship parts and departing to recover the crystal; however, Rowan survives her assault and has an epiphany regarding what must be done to stop her.
13	13	"Return of the Kyber Saber"	Martin Skov & Michael Hegner	Bill Motz & Bob Roth	August 29, 2016	113	0.45
It is Empire Day on Coruscant, and the Emperor sends Vader off to investigate Rebel activity before learning that Naare has almost claimed the last Kyber Saber Crystal; however, Naare has had enough of his belittling and, upon recreating the saber, claims it for herself and sets her sights on becoming Sith Empress. Meanwhile, Rowan uses his Force abilities to rebuild the Star Scavenger before proposing a desperate plan to his siblings; the trio then make their way to Coruscant and attempt to sneak into the Emperor's palace through the planet's sewer system. The Emperor desperately recalls Vader as Naare begins tearing her way through the Imperial fleet using the Kyber Saber, and he quickly determines to evacuate only to run into Rowan, who is disguised as him, and mistake him for a decoy. Rowan then waits in the Emperor's throne room for Naare, while Roger-his head discarded by Naare-informs Kordi and Zander of Naare's plans to claim the Empire; Naare soon discovers Rowan's ruse. The Emperor then attacks with a force of walkers and fighters only for Naare to dispatch them easily, who declares herself Empress and then drops a load of civilians off a ledge when they refuse to acknowledge her. Rowan is then able to use his ability to call to the Kyber Saber Crystals to tear the saber apart and out of Naare's grasp, and reforms the Saber in order to face Naare in a final showdown. After overcoming her, Rowan contemplates using its power to take revenge on her and is encouraged by the Emperor, but rejects the Sith Lord's offer and departs with his siblings and Roger's head. Pursued by TIE Fighters, they deploy Zander's masterpiece, the Blazemaker, as a decoy while the Star Scavenger is reconfigured into a new form to enable it to slip past the planetary defenses. The Freemakers escape while Naare is abducted and frozen in carbonite by a vengeful Graballa, and the Emperor has Rowan placed on his list of top enemies, after the leaders of the Rebellion. Rowan then tosses the Kyber Saber into a volcanic crater to ensure that it will never fall into the wrong hands again, and are then invited to join the Rebellion by Admiral Ackbar.

=== Season 2 (2017) ===
No. overall	No. in season	Title	Directed by	Written by	Original release date	Prod. code	U.S. viewers (millions)
14	1	"A New Home"	Claus Darholt, Frederik Budolph, Jeppe Sandholt & Per Düring Risager	Bill Motz & Bob Roth	June 17, 2017	201	0.26
After joining the Rebel Alliance, the Freemakers embark on a series of misadventures. Kordi's bartering skills earns them jobs as mechanics with the Rebellion. Roger saves the rebel fleet when he accidentally turns himself into a torpedo. Rowan and Roger join forces with Lieutenant Valeria on a starfighter strike mission. Zander attempts to join Lieutenant Valeria's squadron. The Freemakers come to the aid of Lando Calrissian and Chewbacca. This episode is a compilation of the five short clips listed in the section below.
15	2	"Trouble on Tibalt"	Michael Hegner	Bill Motz & Bob Roth	June 17, 2017	202	0.26
While scavenging for the Rebellion on Tibalt, the Freemakers encounter the Imperial hunter droid M-OC, who has been programmed by Emperor Palpatine to hunt down Rowan Freemaker. Rowan also experiences a Force vision to build a special ship called the Arrowhead.
16	3	"The Tower of Alistan Nor"	Per Düring Risager	John Behnke	July 31, 2017	203	N/A
Looking for inspiration to build the Arrowhead, Rowan, his family, and the Mon Calamari starship engineer Quarrie travel to the city of Alistor Nor, which was home to an ancient Jedi order called the Force Builders who were devoted to building ships and fine structures. M-OC catches up with the Freemakers but they managed to escape following a skirmish.
17	4	"The Embersteel Blade"	Jeppe Sandholt	ND Stevenson	August 1, 2017	204	N/A
As part of their quest to build the Arrowhead, the Freemakers go undercover at the Imperial auction on Mygeeto to obtain an Imperial shuttle fitted with embersteel wings. Zander's impulsiveness gets the better of him and the Freemakers get entangled with the Hutt crime lord Graballa. While posing as a Clawdite princess, Kordi is kidnapped by Graballa, who intends to extort a ransom from her family. Kordi's brothers mount a rescue mission and the Freemakers escape with the embersteel shuttle. Darth Vader hires Graballa to mine for kyber crystals.
18	5	"The Storms of Taul"	Martin Skov	Ron Corcillo & Russ Carney	August 2, 2017	205	N/A
The Rebel Alliance dispatches the Freemakers to rescue the rebel spy Bren Derlin. However, the Freemakers get sidetracked by their quest to build the Arrowhead. The smooth-talking pirate Hondo Ohnaka offers to help the Freemakers obtain a proton suspension housing from the acidic world of Taul. However, Hondo double-crosses them and abandons the Freemakers to M-OC. Fortunately, the Freemakers are saved by Roger, who overpowers Hondo. The Freemakers deliver Hondo back to Maz Kanata's castle on Takodana where some gangsters have scores to settle with the pirate.
19	6	"Return to the Wheel"	Frederik Budolph	Ron Corcillo & Russ Carney	August 3, 2017	206	N/A
Continuing their quest to build the Arrowhead, the Freemakers travel back to their home on the Wheel to obtain an energy matrix activator. However, the Freemakers are captured by Graballa who wants to curry Darth Vader's favor. With the help of Roger, the Freemakers managed to escape with the energy matrix activator. For his failure, Darth Vader gives Graballa one final chance.
20	7	"The Lost Crystals of Qalydon"	Per Düring Risager	David Shayne	August 7, 2017	207	N/A
While searching for kyber crystals to incorporate into the Arrowhead's shield generator, the Freemakers visit a Lurmen village on the planet Qalydon. The Imperial officers Durpin and Plumestriker confiscate the villagers' kyber crystals for the Empire's second Death Star. The Freemakers help the Lurmen recover their kyber crystals. Rowan strikes a friendship with a Lurmen girl named Maynar.
21	8	"The Pit and the Pinnacle"	Michael Hegner	John Behnke	August 8, 2017	208	N/A
Using the Force as his guide, Rowan leads his siblings and Roger to a planet rich with kyber crystals. While Zander and Roger repair the damaged StarScavenger, Rowan and Kordi explore an underground temple. Following a series of trials, Rowan forges a giant kyber crystal to power the Arrowhead's shield generator.
22	9	"Flight of the Arrowhead"	Jonas Ussing	Ron Corcillo & Russ Carney	August 9, 2017	209	N/A
The Freemakers return to the rebel fleet only to find it under attack by Imperial forces. To complete the construction of the Arrowhead, the Freemakers travel with Quarrie and the rebel ace pilot Lieutenant Valeria to Jakku. However, the assembly of the Arrowhead is delayed when the ship's energy matrix activator falls into the hands of the Imperial officers Durpin and Plumestriker. Following a skirmish, the Freemakers complete the Arrowhead and return to save the rebel fleet. As a result, the Freemakers are promoted by the Rebel Alliance.
23	10	"A Perilous Rescue"	Martin Skov	David Shayne	August 10, 2017	210	N/A
Zander Freemaker flies the Arrowhead in a strike with Blue Squadron to attack Imperial Star Destroyers at a repair depot near Alzoc III. Kordi is promoted to the Rebel Alliance's Strategy Council. Bored, Rowan and a reluctant Roger embark on a mission to rescue the Lurmen girl Maynar on Qalydon. However, this turns out to be a trap by M-OC. Before M-OC can take Rowan into Imperial custody, Darth Vader disintegrates the droid and takes credit for M-OC's efforts.
24	11	"Escape from Coruscant"	Frederik Budolph	David Shayne	August 14, 2017	211	N/A
Zander, Kordi, and Roger borrow the Arrowhead and embark on an unsanctioned mission to Coruscant rescue their brother Rowan. After the Emperor fails to entice Rowan to the dark side, Darth Vader extracts the location of the kyber crystal planet using a mind probe. Armed with the Arrowhead, the Freemakers decimate much of the Imperial Star Destroyers and TIE fighter defenses above Coruscant. The Freemakers rescue Rowan but a rejuvenated M-OC resurfaces and captures the Arrowhead, currying the Emperor's favor. As the Freemakers flee offworld on a TIE fighter, the Emperor tasks M-OC with eliminating the Freemakers once and for all.
25	12	"Free Fall"	Claus Darholt	John Behnke	August 15, 2017	212	N/A
The Mon Calamari starship builder Quarrie rescues the Freemakers from M-OC's clutches. Together, they flee to the stormy world of Shantipole aboard the StarScavenger with M-OC in hot pursuit. After a rough landing, the Freemakers and Quarrie engineer a trap for M-OC. Following a skirmish in the skies above Shantipole, the Freemakers destroy both the StarScavenger and Arrowhead, seemingly taking out M-OC. However, the invulnerable Imperial hunter droid regenerates and challenges Rowan to a last stand. However, Rowan refuses to fight and accidentally convinces M-OC that there is a flaw in the Emperor's plan to destroy the Rebellion with the second Death Star. Meanwhile, Darth Vader uses the kyber crystals from the crystal planet to arm the second Death Star. Graballa unsuccessfully tries to get Lord Vader to invest in his beachside resort and cafe.
26	13	"Return of the Return of the Jedi"	Martin Skov	Bill Motz & Bob Roth	August 16, 2017	213	N/A
This episode is set during the events of Return of the Jedi. Using his Force Building powers, Rowan Freemaker rebuilds the StarScavenger, incorporating elements of the Arrowhead into its design including the "Embersteel Blade." Meanwhile, M-OC tries to warn the Emperor about the flaw of the Death Star but the Sith Lord is too preoccupied with his imminent meeting with Luke Skywalker. Undeterred, the enhanced M-OC protects the second Death Star's reactor core with a shield generated by the Arrowhead's kyber crystal. After retrieving the Kyber Saber from the lava pits of Mustafar, the Freemakers and Quarrie managed to penetrate the shield with the modified StarScavenger only to be captured by stormtroopers. Zander's love interest Becky Smoochenbacher helps them escape. Rowan engages in a fierce duel with M-OC and uses the Kyber Saber to pierce through his kyber crystal, destroying the Imperial hunter droid. Rowan is rescued by his siblings who race out of the second Death Star seconds before it explodes. The Freemakers join the other rebels in the rebel victory celebrations at Bright Tree Village, where Rowan reveals his force abilities to Luke.

=== Shorts (2017) ===
To celebrate "Star Wars Day", and in advance of the premiere of season 2 in summer 2017, Disney XD aired five Lego Star Wars: The Freemaker Adventures shorts on May 4, 2017, as well as releasing the shorts on the Disney XD website, the Disney XD app, and Disney XD's official YouTube account. The later second-season premiere episode, "A New Home", is composed of the scenes from the shorts.

No.	Title	Original release date
1	"Home One"	May 4, 2017
The Freemakers prove their worth to the Rebellion with Kordi’s amazing bartering skills.
2	"Thrown Into Battle"	May 4, 2017
Roger saves the Rebel Fleet from certain destruction when he accidentally turns himself into a torpedo.
3	"Rowan's Secret Adventure"	May 4, 2017
Rowan winds up in a Y-Wing's tailgunner seat in the middle of an intense battle against the Empire.
4	"Zander Freemaker: Superstar Pilot Guy"	May 4, 2017
Zander attempts to join a fighter squadron by flying his own ship, the Blazemaker.
5	"Beware the Gamorrean Flu"	May 4, 2017
The Freemakers undertake a daring mission to save two of the Rebellion's finest heroes: Lando Calrissian and Chewbacca.

== Release ==
The first season of Lego Star Wars: The Freemaker Adventures premiered on Disney XD on June 20, 2016. The DVD release also includes 'The Freemaker Adventures: Meet the Freemaker Family', 'Freemaker Salvage and Repair', and six exclusive magnets featuring images from the series. The first episode of the second season premiered in the form of five shorts on May 4, 2017. The second season was released on Disney XD on June 17, 2017. Season two DVD (released on March 13, 2018) also includes the 2017 shorts, and a Lego Darth Vader Enamel Pin.

The Freemakers, R0-GR, Naare, Graballa, Baash and Raam appear as playable characters in Lego Star Wars: The Force Awakens via "The Freemaker Adventures Character Pack", released as downloadable content on July 26, 2016. Several Lego sets based on the series were also released between 2016 and 2017.

== Lego Star Wars: All Stars ==
A follow-up television series, Lego Star Wars: All Stars, debuted November 10, 2018. While the Freemakers appear in supporting roles, All-Stars primarily follows other members of their family, including their parents Pace and Lena during Solo: A Star Wars Story, Zander's daughter Moxie during the sequel trilogy, and R0-GR across the entire Star Wars saga.
