= Julie Pinson =

American actress

- Born: November 7, 1967 (age 57); Fremont, California
- Occupation: Actress
- Years active: 1992–2014
- Spouse: Billy Warlock (m. 2006)

Julie Pinson (born November 7, 1967) is an American actress, best known for her work with soap operas. She starred as Eve Lambert on Port Charles, as Billie Reed on Days of Our Lives and as Janet Ciccone on As the World Turns, winning the Daytime Emmy Award for Outstanding Supporting Actress in a Drama Series for latter.

== Life and career ==
Pinson was born in Fremont, California. As a child, she was inspired by her mother, a classically trained opera singer, to get into acting. She attended Fremont Christian School, and graduated from Mission San Jose High School. Pinson later studied acting at the Charles Conrad Studios. Pinson later made her screen debut appearing in the 1992 drama film The Mambo Kings playing secondary role. She later played supporting role in the 1995 comedy-drama film Unstrung Heroes, and in 1997 appeared in the science fiction film Starship Troopers. Later in 1997, Pinson was cast as Dr. Eve Lambert on the ABC daytime soap opera, Port Charles. She played the role from June 1, 1997 to April 1, 2002. She received three Soap Opera Digest Awards nominations for her performance. After leaving the soap, Pinson moved to prime time television guest-starring on sitcoms Dharma & Greg and The Drew Carey Show. In 2004, Pinson had a brief run as Shiloh on the CBS soap opera The Young and the Restless appearing from February 16, 2004 to May 14, 2004.

In 2004, Pinson was cast as Billie Reed (originally played by Lisa Rinna) in the NBC soap opera, Days of Our Lives. Pinson debuted on September 13, 2004, and vacated the role four years later on February 5, 2008. Later in 2008 she joined CBS soap opera As the World Turns as Janet Ciccone. For this performance, Pinson received three Daytime Emmy Award for Outstanding Supporting Actress in a Drama Series nominations, winning in 2010. The soap was canceled in 2010. In 2012 she starred alongside Signy Coleman in the web-series River Ridge as Kimberly Reeves. In 2014 she guest-starred in the ABC comedy-drama series, Castle.

== Personal life ==
Pinson was engaged to fellow actor Billy Warlock, but they broke up shortly before their planned 1999 wedding. They reconnected in 2005 while working together on Days of our Lives and married in Las Vegas on August 26, 2006.

== Filmography ==
=== Film ===
Year	Title	Role	Notes
1992	The Mambo Kings	Girlfriend #2	
1995	Unstrung Heroes	Nurse Franklin	
1997	Starship Troopers	Female Trooper	Uncredited
2010	A Chance Encounter	Her	Short film
2014	I See	Karen Dennis	Short film

=== Television ===
Year	Title	Role	Notes
1997–2001	Port Charles	Dr. Eve Lambert	920 episodes
2001	Dharma & Greg	Cici	Episode: "Dharma Does Dallas"
2002	The Drew Carey Show	Beverly	Episode: "What Women Don't Want"
2004	The Young and the Restless	Shiloh	18 episodes
2004–2008	Days of Our Lives	Billie Reed	379 episodes
2008–2010	As the World Turns	Janet Ciccone	362 episodes
2012	River Ridge	Kimberly Reeves	6 episodes
2014	Castle	Diane Beaumont	Episode: "Smells Like Teen Spirit"

== Awards ==
=== Daytime Emmy Awards ===
- Outstanding Supporting Actress (2011) Nominated
- Outstanding Supporting Actress (2010) Won
- Outstanding Supporting Actress (2009) Nominated

=== Soap Opera Digest Awards ===
- Outstanding Supporting Actress (2000) Nominated
- Outstanding Younger Lead Actress (1999) Nominated
