= Fallen Arches (film) =

- Theatrical poster
- Directed by: Ron Cosentino
- Written by: Ron Cosentino
- Produced by: Libby Osborn; Ron Cosentino; Victor Cosentino
- Starring: Richard Portnow; Karen Black; Ron Thompson; Peter Onorati; Tamara Braun; Carmine Giovinazzo; Louis Ferreira
- Cinematography: Darko Suvak
- Edited by: Ron Cosentino
- Music by: Rick Giovinazzo
- Distributed by: Vanguard
- Release date: 1998
- Running time: 100 minutes
- Country: United States
- Language: English

Fallen Arches is a 1998 crime film starring Richard Portnow, Karen Black, Ron Thompson, Peter Onorati, Tamara Braun, Carmine Giovinazzo, Louis Ferreira and written, produced and directed by Ron Cosentino.

== Plot ==
Two New Yorker brothers, Frankie and Duke Romano, relocate from to Los Angeles with their alcoholic mother and become involved in a small-time theft of designer shoes that spirals into a full blown conflict with Nicky Kaplan, a local crime boss.

== Cast ==
- Carmine Giovinazzo as Frankie Romano
- Louis Ferreira as Robert "Duke" Romano
- Karen Black as Lucy Romano
- Peter Onorati as Charlie
- Richard Portnow as Nicky Kaplan
- Jan Schweiterman as Ricky
- Phillip Glasser as Pete
- Tamara Braun as Jenny
- Tim Colceri as Officer Harding
- J. J. Johnston as Stuart
- Susan Peretz as Marie
- Ron Thompson as Leslie
- Marco Greco as Ronnie Sparks
- Meredith Monroe as Karissa
- Buddy Giovinazzo as Buddy

== Critical reception ==
DVD Talk, "Fallen Arches has the feel of a production that's been one person's labor of love for too long."

Variety, "Equal parts screwball comedy and neo-classic Greek tragedy, "Fallen Arches" is yet another riff on the mob. Helmer Ron Cosentino does a nice job balancing conflicting tones."
