= Louis Ferreira =

Canadian actor

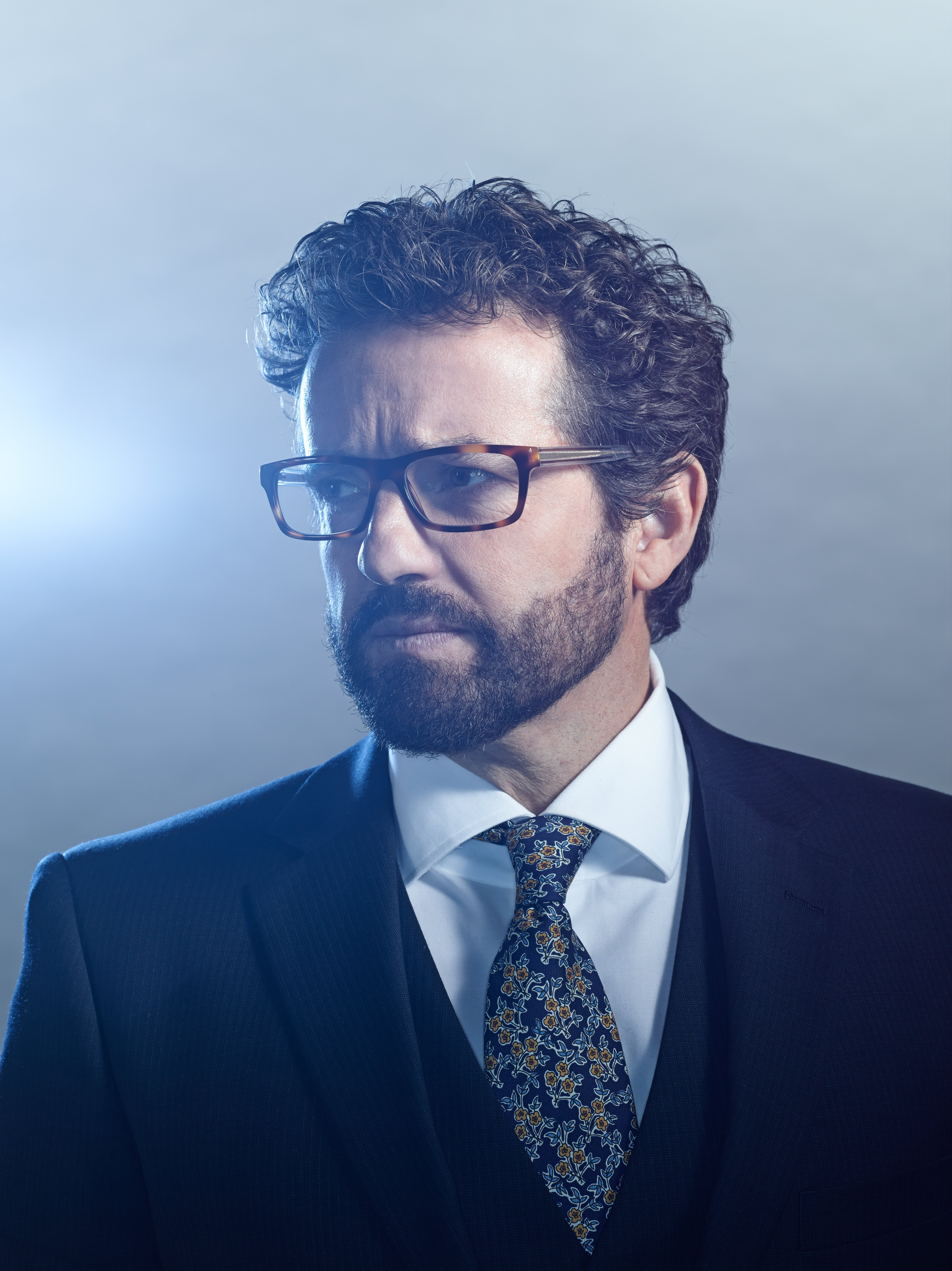
- Ferreira in 2014
- Born: Luís Henrique da Rocha Ferreira; 20 February 1966 (age 60); Terceira Island, Azores, Portugal
- Other names: Justin Louis; Justin Lewis
- Occupation: Actor
- Years active: 1986–present

Louis Ferreira (born Luís Henrique da Rocha Ferreira; born 20 February 1966) is a Canadian actor. Ferreira is known for his roles in Stargate Universe as Colonel Everett Young, serial killer Ray Prager in the first season of Durham County, FBI Assistant Director John Pollock in Missing, and Art Blank in Saw IV, Saw V, and Saw 3D. He starred in the CTV series Motive as homicide detective Oscar Vega. Before 2008, he was credited under the stage name Justin Louis.

== Early life ==
Ferreira was born on 20 February 1966, in Terra Chã, Terceira, Azores, and immigrated with his parents to Canada early in his life. He grew up in the Jane and Finch neighbourhood in North York, Ontario.

The actor went by the stage name Justin Louis for 25 years until his Portuguese-born mother died in 2008, after which he decided to use his family name and "Louis", an approximation of his given name, "Luís".

== Career ==
Ferreira's résumé includes over 100 onscreen credits, as he has appeared on a broad range of television shows, including lead roles in Hidden Hills, Durham County, Urban Angel, Missing, and Bad Blood. He has also played recurring or guest roles in various TV shows, including NCIS, CSI: Crime Scene Investigation, and Criminal Minds. After playing the recurring roles of Declan in season five of Breaking Bad, and Colonel Henderson Hall in Primeval: New World, he also starred in the CTV series Motive as homicide detective Oscar Vega, with recurring roles in The Romeo Section, and This Life. He also hosted the television series Letters to God.

In 2009, Ferreira was featured as David Maysles in the HBO award-winning film Grey Gardens opposite Jessica Lange and Drew Barrymore. Other film credits include portraying Sarah Polley's husband in Dawn of the Dead, as well as roles in Shooter, and The Lazarus Child. Ferreira played the role of Earl in the 1995 film Blood and Donuts and appeared in the 2007 film Saw IV. Further credits include The Marsh, Boozecan, and The Big Slice. He also portrayed Donald Trump in Trump Unauthorized, and was a lead in the miniseries The Andromeda Strain.

In 2010, he became known as FBI SWAT Sergeant Brian in The Town filming in Los Angeles, California.

In 2011, he became known as "The Voice of Mazda", voicing a series of commercials for their national campaign for two years. Other voice-over work includes Police Officer Vince in the TV series The Dating Guy, and Chet in the episode "Hyde and Go Shriek" in the animated children's series Tales from the Cryptkeeper.

In 2017, he became part of the reboot S.W.A.T. with Shemar Moore. He plays the character Team Leader Sergeant Buck Spivey.

== Awards ==
Ferreira won the Best Actor Award for his portrayal of Robert (Duke) Romano in Fallen Arches at the Chicago Alt.Film Fest in 1999. In 2008, he won the Gemini Award for Best Performance by an Actor in a Continuing Leading Dramatic Role for his work portraying the serial killer Ray Prager in Durham County. He was nominated for the same award in 2010 for the role of Colonel Everett Young in the TV series Stargate Universe. He won the Leo Award for Best Lead Performance by a Male in a Dramatic Series in 2014 and 2015. He was nominated for the same Leo Award in 2016.

== Filmography ==
=== Film ===
Year	Title	Role	Notes
1986	Doing Life	Bobby	TV film
1987	Hello Mary Lou: Prom Night II	Craig Nordham	
1988	Cocktail	Soldier	
1988	Drop-Out Mother	Unknown	TV film
1989	Renegades	Rookie Cop	
1989	Brown Bread Sandwiches	Fiorello	
1990	Defy Gravity	Unknown	
1990	Stella	Cocaine Dealer	
1990	The Kissing Place	Dave	TV film
1991	The Big Slice	Andy McCafferty	
1991	Firing Squad	Greg Blair	TV film
1991	Naked Lunch	Exterminator #3	
1992	Aaron Sent Me	Sergeant Mallin	
1992	The Trial of Red Riding Hood	M.C. Porker	TV film
1993	Desiree's Wish	Luther	Short film
1993	Night Owl	Alex	TV film
1993	Ultimate Betrayal	Wayne	TV film
1993	Vendetta II: The New Mafia	Frankie Jr.	TV film
1993	Voices From Within	Brooks Taylor	TV film
1994	Boozecan	Pasqua	
1995	Blood & Donuts	Earl	
1995	A Dream Is a Wish Your Heart Makes	Young Frankie Avalon	TV film
1995	Jack Reed: One of Our Own	Mick Williams	TV film
1996	A Brother's Promise	Nick Thometz	TV film
1997	Dad's Week Off	Chip	TV film
1997	The Notorious 7	Eddie Alighieri	TV film
1997	The Perfect Mother	John Podaras	TV film
1998	The Staircase	Mr. Mouly	TV film
2000	Everything Put Together	Russ	
2000	The Contender	America Live Producer	Uncredited
2000	Fallen Arches	Robert "Duke" Romano	
2001	Loves Music, Loves to Dance	Detective Vincent D'Salva	TV film
2001	Scenes of the Crime	Louis	
2001	Stiletto Dance	James Launcher	TV film
2002	Savage Messiah	Vern	
2004	Dawn of the Dead	Luis Clark	
2004	Tricks	Donny	
2004	The Lazarus Child	Lewis Kern	
2004	Chestnut: Hero of Central Park	Matt Tomley	
2005	Trump Unauthorized	Donald Trump	TV film
2006	The Marsh	Noah Pitney	
2007	Shooter	FBI Assistant Special Agent-In-Charge Howard Purnell	
2007	Saw IV	Art	
2008	True Confessions of a Hollywood Starlet	Sam	TV film
2009	Grey Gardens	David Maysles	TV film
2010	A Weekend to Remember	Thomas Taylor	Short film
2010	The Town	FBI SWAT Sergeant Brian	
2012	Dancing Still	Shane	Short film
2014	Through the Pane	Lewis	Short film
2015	Life on the Line	Mr. Fontaine	Direct-to-video release
2016	Arthur	Antonio	Short film
2016	Counter Act	Unknown	Short film
2017	The Undertaker's Son	Johnathan Redding	Short film
2018	The Lake	Therapist	Short film
2018	The Great Lakutsa	Frank	Short film
2019	Duke	Guard	
2022	The Adventures of Peanut and Pig	Voice	Direct-to-video release

=== Television ===
Year	Title	Role	Notes
1986	Kay O' Brien	Santino's Friend	Episode: "Dollar and Sense"
1986–1988	Night Heat	Jones / Ray / Rick	4 episodes
1988	Katts and Dogs	Old Cop	Episode: "Dogged Pursuit"
1988-1990	T. and T.	Roman / Joe 'Dancin' Joe' DiMarco	2 episodes
1988–89	Friday the 13th: The Series	Danny / Eddie	2 episodes
1990	21 Jump Street	Dean's Brother	Episode: "Back to School"
1990	Top Cops	Danny Edwards	Episode: "George Cadavid / Bill Willis / Andrea Huff"
1990	Street Legal	Dirk Kendrick	Episode: "The Bracelet"
1991–1992	Urban Angel	Victor Torres	15 episodes
1991	Scales of Justice	John Horvath	Episode: "Regina vs Horvath"
1993	Tales from the Cryptkeeper	Chet (voice)	Episode: "Hyde and Go Shriek"
1993	JFK: Reckless Youth	Kirksey	2 episodes
1993	North of 60	Claudio Sangalli	Episode: "Ciao, Baby"
1993	Kung-Fu: The Legends Continues	Kyle Bettinger	Episode: "Dragonswing"
1993	Frontline	Translation Voiceover	Episode: "Romeo and Juliet in Sarajevo"
1993	Monster Force	Additional voices	13 episodes
1995	Highlander: The Series	Peter Kanis	Episode: "Leader of the Pack"
1995–1999	The Outer Limits	Winston Meyerburg / Father John Royce	2 episodes
1996	Public Morals	Detective Mickey Crawford	13 episodes
1996	Local Heroes	Mert	7 episodes
1996	Two	Ben	Episode: "No Man's Land"
1997	The Pretender	'Scooty' Boyd	Episode: "Scott Free"
1997	Cracker	Jeffrey / Leon, The Stalker	Episode: Talk to Me"
1998–1999	Trinity	Detective Bobby McCallister	9 episodes
1998	Star Trek: Voyager	Trevis	Episode: "Once Upon a Time"
1998	The Net	Kyle Lockwood	Episode: "Death of an Angel"
1998	Millennium	Edward	Episode: "The Pest House"
1998	Three	Monty Williams	2 episodes
1998	The Sentinel	Arthur Sabin	Episode: "Finkelman's Folly"
1999	St. Michael's Crossing	Vincent	Pilot episode
1999	Judging Amy	Mr. Harbert	Episode: "Near Death Experience"
1999	Two Guys and a Girl	Brandon	Episode: "Career Day"
2000	The Fugitive	Leo	Episode: "Far From Home"
2000	ER	Michael Muller	Episode: "The Domino Heart"
2000	Battery Park	Detective Ben Nolin	6 episodes
2000	Bull	John O'Leary	Episode: "One Night in Bangkok"
2001	The Fighting Fitzgeralds	Jim	10 episodes
2002–2003	Hidden Hills	Doug Barber	18 episodes
2002	Relic Hunter	Knowles	Episode: "Under the Ice"
2002	Mutant X	Henry Voight	Episode: "Nothing to Fear"
2003	24	Danny Dessler	2 episodes
2004–2006	Missing	FBI Assistant Director John Pollack	37 episodes
2005	CSI: Crime Scene Investigation	Ken Wellstone	Episode: "Nestling Dolls"
2006	CSI: Miami	Jason Adams	Episode: "Free Fall"
2007	Durham County	Ray Prager	6 episodes
2008	The Andromeda Strain	Colonel James C. Ferrus	4 episodes
2009–2010	The Dating Guy	Police Officer Vince (voice)	6 episodes
2009–2011	Stargate Universe	Colonel Everett Young	41 episodes
2009	Criminal Minds	Roy Colson	Episode: "Omnivore" credited as Justin Lewis
2012–2013	Breaking Bad	Declan	3 episodes
2012–2024	NCIS	Metro Detective Nick Burris/Harlan Atwood	2 episodes
2012	Touch	Felipe	Episode: "Music of the Spheres"
2012	The L.A. Complex	Dean Pirelli	4 episodes
2013–2016	Motive	Oscar Vega	52 episodes
2013	Primeval: New World	Colonel Henderson Hall	3 episodes
2013	Rookie Blue	Jacob Blackstone	2 episodes
2015–2016	This Life	David K. Crowley	10 episodes
2015	The Romeo Section	Fred Foy	6 episodes
2015	Ghost Unit	Lincoln	1 episode
2016	Bates Motel	Dr. Guynan	2 episodes
2016	Aftermath	Bob 'Moondog' Black (voice)	11 episodes
2016–2018	Travelers	Rick Hall	4 episodes
2017–2020, 2024	S.W.A.T.	Buck Spivey	9 episodes
2017	Taken	Carlos Mejia	Pilot episode
2017	Real Detective	Detective John Conaty	Episode: "Blood Brothers"
2018	The X-Files	Detective Costa	Episode: "Ghouli"
2018	Bad Blood	Domenic Cosoleto	8 episodes
2018	Arrow	Jerry Bertinelli	Episode: "Divided"
2018	The Fixer	Gabriel	Pilot episode
2019–2020	SEAL Team	Dr. Conners	3 episodes
2019	The Man in the High Castle	Brad Bellows	6 episodes
2019	Limetown	Max Finlayson	5 episodes
2020	Westworld	Dr. Alpert	Episode: "Decoherence"
2021	Riverdale	Vittorio 'Vito' Alto	Episode: "Chapter Eighty-Eight: Citizen Lodge"
2024	Shōgun	Captain Ferreira	Episode: "Servants of Two Masters"
2025	House of David	Jesse	Main cast
2025	Government Cheese	N/A	Episode: "The Gospel of Kenny Sharp"

=== Video games ===
Year	Title	Role	Notes
2016	Dead Rising 4	PMC Soldier (voice)	
2025	Assassin's Creed Shadows	Additional voices	
