= Terror in the Mall =

1998 film by Norberto Barba

- Film poster
- Teleplay by: John Mandel and Dan Gordon
- Story by: Dan Gordon
- Directed by: Norberto Barba
- Starring: Rob Estes; Shannon Sturges; David Soul; Kai Wiesinger; Angeline Ball
- Music by: Christopher Franke
- Countries of origin: United States; Germany
- Original language: English

Production
- Producers: Konstantin Thoeren; Wolf Bauer
- Cinematography: Cristiano Pogany
- Editor: Roberto Silvi
- Running time: 85 minutes
- Production companies: UFA Babelsberg GmbH; Wolper Productions; Warner Bros. Television
- Budget: $5.5 million

Original release
- Network: Fox Network
- Release: July 29, 1998

Terror in the Mall is a 1998 thriller television film directed by Norberto Barba and starring Rob Estes, Shannon Sturges, David Soul, Kai Wiesinger and Angeline Ball. The film is about a group of people trapped in a deserted mall during a flood along with an escaped prisoner.

== Premise ==
During a heavy flood a group of people become trapped in a deserted mall. Notwithstanding, this is not their biggest problem as an escaped prisoner is with them.

== Cast ==
- Rob Estes as Glen Savoy
- Shannon Sturges as Dr. Sheri Maratos
- David Soul as Roger Karey
- Kai Wiesinger as Chris Maratos
- Angeline Ball as Suzanne Price
- Terence Maynard as David Geha
