= Tornado! =

- Promotional film poster
- Genre: Action; Drama
- Written by: John Logan
- Directed by: Noel Nosseck
- Starring: Bruce Campbell; Shannon Sturges; Ernie Hudson; L. Q. Jones
- Music by: Garry Schyman
- Country of origin: United States
- Original language: English

Production
- Executive producers: Robert M. Sertner; Frank von Zerneck
- Producers: Artie Mandelberg; Stacy Mandelberg; Randy Sutter
- Production location: Austin, Texas
- Cinematography: Paul Maibaum
- Editors: David Codron; Robert Florio
- Running time: 89 minutes
- Production company: Hallmark Entertainment

Original release
- Network: Fox
- Release: May 6, 1996

Tornado! is a 1996 American made-for-television disaster film that is directed by Noel Nosseck and starring Bruce Campbell and Shannon Sturges and was aired on the Fox television network on May 6, 1996.

== Plot ==
Jake Thorne (Bruce Campbell) is a storm chaser whose friend and former graduate school advisor, Dr. Joe Branson (Ernie Hudson), has developed a machine that may be able to provide earlier tornado warnings. To work properly, the machine has firing mechanisms on each of its 4 legs. These drive the legs two feet into the ground and anchor it, so it can collect data without being taken by the storm. Dr. Branson, Jake, Jake's grandfather Ephram (L.Q. Jones), and an assistant set up at Ephram's ranch near Byron, Texas, where tornado activity is expected in the coming days. Samantha Callen (Shannon Sturges) is a government auditor who must determine whether Dr. Branson's project warrants more funding. She stays at the ranch with the team. Jake has to try to convince Samantha that the machine is worthwhile. Meanwhile, Jake's high school rival Ritchie, a meteorologist in Amarillo, doubts Jake's work. An F4 tornado strikes Roseville, Texas one afternoon with no warning issued, killing a number of residents and reinforcing Samantha's belief in the project. During the process, Jake and Samantha become romantically attracted to each other, but a powerful F5 tornado threatens the lives of all the major characters as it closes in on Byron one night. Ritchie, after talking to Jake on the phone and realizing the severity of the situation, cuts into programming with a warning against his superior's orders. While deploying Dr. Branson's machine, one of its firing mechanisms fails. Ephram and Dr. Branson work to drive the disabled leg into the soil as the tornado hits the ranch. Jake successfully gets Samantha, the assistant, and Dr. Branson into the storm cellar, but Ephram refuses and continues to hammer the leg into the ground. Ephram is killed, but succeeds in anchoring the machine before the storm takes his life. Thanks to Ritchie's warning, there are no deaths besides Ephram's in this tornado. The film ends at Ephram's funeral, where Ritchie and Jake reconcile, Dr. Branson thanks Ephram for his sacrifice, and Jake and Samantha begin their relationship. Ephram's sacrifice allowed Dr. Branson's machine to collect the data needed to increase lead time for tornado warnings and potentially save lives.

== Cast ==
- Bruce Campbell as Jake Thorne
- Ernie Hudson as Dr. Joe Branson
- Shannon Sturges as Samantha Callen
- Bo Eason as "Tex" Fulton
- L. Q. Jones as Ephram Thorne
- Shannon Woodward as Lucy

== Filming ==
Tornado! was filmed primarily in Austin, Texas, including scenes at local Fox Broadcasting Company affiliate KTBC. The film runs 89 minutes, and has been released on VHS, DVD and Netflix. It is rated PG for some perilous weather sequences, mild language, and sensuality.

== See also ==
- Twister, a 1996 theatrical release
