= River Ridge (TV series) =

- Created by: Tyler Ford
- Starring: Signy Coleman; Matthew Daniell; Danielle DiLorenzo; Mark Doherty; Beth Ehlers; Seth Ford; Christina Jackson; Matt McAbee; Isabella Nolan; Jon Prescott; Julie Pinson; Shannon Sturges; Carrie Watt
- Opening theme: "River Road" by Amanda & Travis Marsh
- Country of origin: United States
- No. of seasons: 1
- No. of episodes: 6

Production
- Executive producers: Tyler Ford; Signy Coleman

Original release
- Network: The SFN
- Release: January 13 – February 17, 2012

River Ridge is a 2012 dramatic web series created by Tyler Ford and co-produced by Ford and lead actress Signy Coleman. The series was described as "the interwoven kaleidoscope of the residents of a small east coast town and their familiar and relatable circumstances." The series was announced in 2010, repeatedly delayed, released in January 2012 and lasted for six episodes of 11 minutes each.

== Synopsis ==
The series features dramatic, real-life stories such as strained familial relationships, young love, prejudice, economic hardships, and mental illness. The goal of River Ridge, Ford explains, was to "create a patchwork of interconnected stories."

== Cast and characters ==
- Signy Coleman as Sharon Reeves: A devoted mother, daughter, sister, and friend, who is forced to confront the history of dysfunction that she shares with her distant sister, Kimberly.
- Matthew Daniell as Nicholas 'Shaw' Shaw: Referred to simply as “Shaw”, he is a star athlete struggling to define his identity.
- Danielle DiLorenzo as Kenzie Collins: An independent, tough New York City native who abandons her dreams for love, only to find her new life suffocating and empty.
- Mark Doherty as Silas Carter: A blue-collar, tough foreman of a construction company, who wears his heart on his sleeve.
- Beth Ehlers as Coryn Foster: The economically plagued mother of Wyatt, battling childhood trauma and the unraveling effects of mental illness.
- Seth Ford as Wyatt Foster: A rebellious teenager, coping with the repercussions and negative effects of his mother's mental state.
- Christina Jackson as Reese Bradley: An intelligent, hard working high school senior focused on her academic aspirations.
- Matt McAbee as Avery Reeves: A gifted baseball player navigating scholastic pressures, and the intolerance of an unexpected blossoming relationship.
- Isabella Nolan as Ruby Jensen: The resilient daughter of damaged parents.
- Julie Pinson as Kimberly Reeves: The sister of Sharon and a musician who abandoned her roots to pursue her dreams. The journey of a dreamer however is not without sacrifice and her return to River Ridge begins a quest for resolve.
- Jon Prescott as Brad Rylan: The prodigal son of a wealthy family, whose disintegrating romantic relationship throws him on a path of self-discovery forcing him to re-evaluate his purpose and destiny.
- Shannon Sturges as Blythe Jensen: The innately nurturing and compassionate high school guidance counselor, trying to balance the weight of her work with newly found romance.
- Carrie Watt as Emily 'Emme' Foster: A free spirited teenager filled with intense passion to capture the beauty of the world through her art, which is also used as an escape from her unstable family environment.

== Production ==
In a July 2010 interview, co-producer and lead actress Signy Coleman revealed the “impending” production of River Ridge.

Nearly a year later, in May 2011, production had only resulted in a trailer. At that time, co-producer Tyler Ford stated that in many ways River Ridge was inspired by his own experiences growing up in New Castle, Delaware.

The first episode, which ran 17 minutes, was posted to the web in January 2012, followed in consecutive weeks by five more 11 minute episodes. Production ended, and the series did not return after February 2012.

=== Setting ===
River Ridge is set in the fictional east coast town of River Ridge and is filmed on location in the historical town of New Castle, Delaware.

== Episodes ==
No.	Title	Original release date
1	"The Commons"	January 13, 2012
The introduction to the residents of a small east coast town and their familiar and relatable circumstances are explored.
2	"Tell My Stories To The One's I Love, Hide My Fears From Those I Don't"	January 20, 2012
A confrontational brunch with Brad's mother leaves Kenzie hysterically distraught. Meanwhile, Coryn reluctantly meets with Blythe, regarding Emme’s academic future. Elsewhere, Kimberly surprises Avery at the baseball field, which leads to a conversation of confessions.
3	"Surrender, Confess, Make Amends, Call It A Night"	January 27, 2012
Emotional baggage begins to strain Silas and Blythe's relationship. A quiet dinner shared between Sharon and Kimberly quickly turns volatile.
4	"Both Sides Of The Gun"	February 3, 2012
Kenzie resorts to drastic measures to express her feelings to Brad. Meanwhile, Coryn's depths of despair unintentionally are unleashed upon "Emme". Reese has an unexpected visitor. Elsewhere, Avery pushes Sharon to her limit, and the consequences shatter the lives of many.
5	"Irreparable"	February 10, 2012
Unsaid words finally reach the surface, as Kimberly and Sharon exchange bitter truths. Avery and Reese’s blossoming relationship is challenged. Silas is pulled into a complicated situation.
6	"Backwards Walk"	February 17, 2012
Left with no options, Coryn unearths her traumatic past with hope for resolve. Brad and Kenzie reach a crossroads. Outside forces complicate Silas' and Blythe's existence. One person leaves River Ridge behind, while another person's life hangs in the balance.
