= Haunting Sarah =

2005 television film

- Film poster
- Genre: Horror
- Based on: New Year's Eve by Lisa Grunwald
- Teleplay by: Tony Phelan; Joan Rater
- Directed by: Ralph Hemecker
- Starring: Kim Raver; Niamh Wilson; Ryland Thiessen; Alison Sealy-Smith; Rick Roberts
- Music by: Joel Goldsmith
- Country of origin: United States
- Original language: English

Production
- Executive producers: Stacy Mandelberg; Robert M. Sertner; Frank von Zerneck; Michael Edelstein
- Producers: Randy Sutter; Peter Sadowski
- Cinematography: Christian Sebaldt
- Editor: Quincy Z. Gunderson
- Running time: 89 minutes
- Production companies: Edelstein Company; Von Zerneck/Sertner Films

Original release
- Network: Lifetime
- Release: October 3, 2005

Haunting Sarah is a 2005 American horror television film directed by Ralph Hemecker and written by Tony Phelan and Joan Rater, based on the 1996 novel New Year's Eve by Lisa Grunwald. It stars Kim Raver, Niamh Wilson, Ryland Thiessen, Alison Sealy-Smith, and Rick Roberts. In the film, a woman who has lost her son finds out that her niece is in contact with his spirit. It aired on Lifetime on October 3, 2005.

== Plot ==
Erica and Heather Rose are identical twins who share a bond that becomes stronger as they grow up. As adults, their lives have had many parallels: They both have successful careers (Erica is an author and teacher and Heather is a doctor) and both are happily married and loving mothers to seven-year-old children, first cousins, Sarah and David.

Erica's daughter Sarah and Heather's son David grow up sharing an equally close bond, but David is struck by a car and dies. Erica anguishes over how she might be able to explain to Sarah that David is dead, but the bond between the two children seems to extend past the grave, as Sarah reveals that David has already told her he is gone. At school, Sarah hurts a boy from her class when he makes a negative comment about David. When her parents pick her up, Sarah nervously tells them that she doesn't want them to drive over Creek Bridge. Later, they find out there was an accident on that bridge and Sarah had drawn a picture of it because David had told her to. That day, Sarah's nanny, Rosie, notices that the girl has a strange bruise on the back of her neck.

Erica and her husband Edgar decide that Erica and Sarah should go stay at the family's country house to help Sarah forget about David. In the city, Heather is still in grief so she decides to drive out to the country house to join her sister. Rosie finds out that Sarah is still in contact with David and gives her a friendship bracelet to protect her. Rosie tells Erica she thinks the bruises may be from David's spirit looking to cross back over, holding onto the neck of a living person, which she refers to as 'hanting.' During the night, Erica, Heather and Rosie run to Sarah's room at her screams and see that her wrist is swollen and bloody, as if someone was trying to rip the bracelet off. Rosie is apprehensive as she senses that David might be a danger to Sarah. The twins however disregard her warnings and decide it would be best to have Rosie leave because of her beliefs, wary they might be impacting Sarah. As Heather drops off Rosie the next morning, Rosie begs her to at least place the talisman bracelet she'd made before under Sarah's pillow or bed, in order to help protect Sarah. Heather agrees, yet the moment Rosie leaves she chucks it out of the car window. Rosie, unawares of her action, yet feels a chill. Heather and Sarah start building a dollhouse as a memorial for David but don't tell Erica that is its purpose. Erica surprisingly finds out she is 12 weeks pregnant, after Sarah mysteriously mentions her having a baby, and is put on bed rest. She again says David told her. Erica starts getting jealous because Sarah spends a lot of time with Heather building the dollhouse, but eventually calms down when she sees how beautiful it is; she apologizes to both for being so neurotic. Later, Edgar shows Erica a house he put an offer on. The strange thing is that it's an exact replica of the dollhouse. They move in, although Erica does so reluctantly as she cannot explain how the dollhouse can be an almost exact replica of the house, or how Sarah could've known.

Three months later, Sarah is still acting strangely: she never has an appetite, is always tired and doesn't make any friends at the new school. Concerned, Erica takes her to the psychologist, who notices the bruises on her neck and wants to call social services, thinking Erica might be hurting her own daughter. However, Heather (a colleague) talks her out of it. When Heather mentions it to Erica, the latter freaks out and tells her sister to leave; accusing her that Heather believes Erica's baby might be David's reincarnation. Outside, as she leaves Heather sees Sarah holding a sign to the window saying "HE'S MAD". When Erica asks Sarah if she knows how she got the bruises or what is wrong, Sarah shows Erica the toy figure on her shelf that had belonged to David (it had fallen on the street, which was why he ran back and got struck by the car that killed him). Erica, surprised to find it there, throws it in the bin to which Sarah says "You shouldn't have done that!". Erica looks up 'Hanting', reading that the host's life force is drained by the Hant and the host then slips into a coma and dies. Erica rushes to the school for Sarah but finds out that Heather impersonated her and picked Sarah up earlier. Erica eventually finds Sarah and Heather with another colleague of Heather's who is a hypnotist. They are talking to Sarah, but calling her David, who is repeatedly shouting "I want to be born now, I want to be born NOW!". Sarah suddenly attacks Erica, lunge/pounce/flying at her neck, screaming "You are not my mother. You bitch!". Once they manage to pry Sarah off her, and the hypnotist calls Sarah back into her body, Heather explains that she only wanted to talk to David (and that Erica would do the same in her shoes) but Erica punches her and storms out with Sarah.

Erica calls Rosie back after seeing the increasing strong bruises on Sarah's neck and now back. Rosie explains that David is hanging on to Sarah, buying time while waiting for Erica's baby to be born so that he can take its body and be reborn. They get rid of everything that belonged to David. Erica finds the dollhouse down in the basement and Rosie says that it is no wonder David has been so strong; he had been given an invite and a place/home of his own to live in, that the dollhouse was a "spirit-house". Erica burns down the dollhouse and Sarah throws the last picture she has of David into the flames, finally accepting the death of her cousin. That night, Erica realizes they hadn't burned everything of David's; the toy she had thrown away is still in Sarah's room. She and Edgar hurry to Sarah and find her on the top story window ledge. Sarah says that David tells her it won't hurt, then jumps off the roof crashing to the floor below. She is rushed to hospital and the doctor explains that she suffered severe head trauma and is in a coma. Erica senses her sisters distress and visits them at the hospital. She decides that they should give David what he wants in order to save Sarah. Heather injects Erica with a medication that will induce the birth of the baby. Erica gives birth to a baby girl, much to everyone's surprise. But then starts having more contractions; after an emergency C-section, Erica has a healthy second baby – a boy. At the same moment the boy starts to cry, Sarah opens her eyes, showing that David has let go of her. Heather takes the boy in her arms and looks at him lovingly.

One year later, at their Halloween party, the family seems to be happy and Sarah is in good health. Erica has finally published her new book about twin studies. A red devils mask creeps up to baby boy Jack's crib – as the mask is removed, the audience sees it's Sarah. She says: "Hello David. Now, I'm the one in charge", as she smiles menacingly.

== Cast ==
- Kim Raver as Erica Rose Lewis / Heather Rose Lord
- Niamh Wilson as Sarah Lewis
- Ryland Thiessen as David Lord
- Alison Sealy-Smith as Rosie
- Rick Roberts as Edgar Lewis
- Gordon Tanner as Richard Lord
- Terri Cherniak as Dr. Rachel Koening
- Marina Stephenson Kerr as Dr. Samantha Graton
- Blake Taylor as Dr. Christopher Myman

== Reception ==
The Futon Critic reported that Haunting Sarah drew 4 million viewers on its October 3, 2005 debut, marking it as the 15th most-watched program that week. Roger Catlin of Hartford Courant that it was enjoyable to watch actress Kim Raver in the twin lead roles of Erika and Heather Rose. Fearscene wrote that as it was a Lifetime movie, they did not expect much from it, but offered that they were intrigued by the characters of Erica and Heather Rose and that although the film seemed to try to go in too many directions, it was mildly entertaining.

== Recognition ==
=== Awards ===
- 2006, For her role as Sarah Lewis in the film, Niamh Wilson won a 2006 Young Artist Award for "Best Performance in a TV Movie, Miniseries or Special - Supporting Young Actress"
