= Maz Kanata =

Star Wars character

- Star Wars character
- Maz Kanata in The Force Awakens
- First appearance: The Force Awakens (2015)
- Created by: Lawrence Kasdan; J. J. Abrams; Michael Arndt
- Portrayed by: Lupita Nyong'o (Note: Motion capture and voice); Arti Shah (Note: Motion capture double)
- Voiced by: Lupita Nyong'o (Note: Episodes VII–IX Lego Star Wars: The Force Awakens Star Tours: The Adventures Continue Star Wars Forces of Destiny Star Wars Rebels (archive audio)); Grey Griffin (Note: Lego Star Wars: The Freemaker Adventures Lego Star Wars: The Resistance Rises Star Wars Battlefront II Star Wars: Young Jedi Adventures)

In-universe information
- Gender: Female
- Occupation: Tavern keeper
- Homeworld: Takodana

Maz Kanata is a fictional character in the Star Wars franchise. Introduced in the 2015 film Star Wars: The Force Awakens, she is a computer-generated character voiced and performed through motion capture by Lupita Nyong'o. Maz, a former pirate and smuggler, is more than a thousand years old and manages an interstellar tavern in a castle on the fictional planet Takodana. While Maz's small role in the trilogy has been criticized, Nyong'o's performance and the technical aspects of the character have been praised by critics. For her performance in The Force Awakens, Nyong'o was nominated for a Saturn Award for Best Supporting Actress.

== Character ==
=== Concept and creation ===
The Force Awakens writer/director J. J. Abrams told Entertainment Weekly in November 2015, "I wanted to do [Maz] as a puppet originally, but once we figured out the things that she was required to do, it felt like performance capture was the way to go." With most of the other creatures in her scenes being practical effects, Abrams noted:

Maz needed to look and feel and be just like one of those creatures. And given her mobility, and given the role that she played, it became clear that that was one creature where we should use the tool of CG. But the performance was all Lupita. She was there on set, and we did capture sessions afterwards as well.

Abrams said, "I had some specific ideas about how she would work and what she would do. I had this pitch about these goggles that she wore. Her eyes are an important aspect of her character, and you'll see how it plays out." Abrams told his home town newspaper, the Palisadian-Post, that he based Maz on his late Palisades Charter High School English teacher Rose Gilbert. He said:

We really wanted the story to feel authentic, despite being a wild fantasy. I mentioned Rose in an early story meeting as a sort of timeless, wise figure that I'd actually known in my life ... While we experimented with many looks and styles before settling on the character's final design, Rose was always at the center of the inspiration for Maz.

For The Rise of Skywalker, Maz was created using animatronic puppetry.

=== Portrayal ===
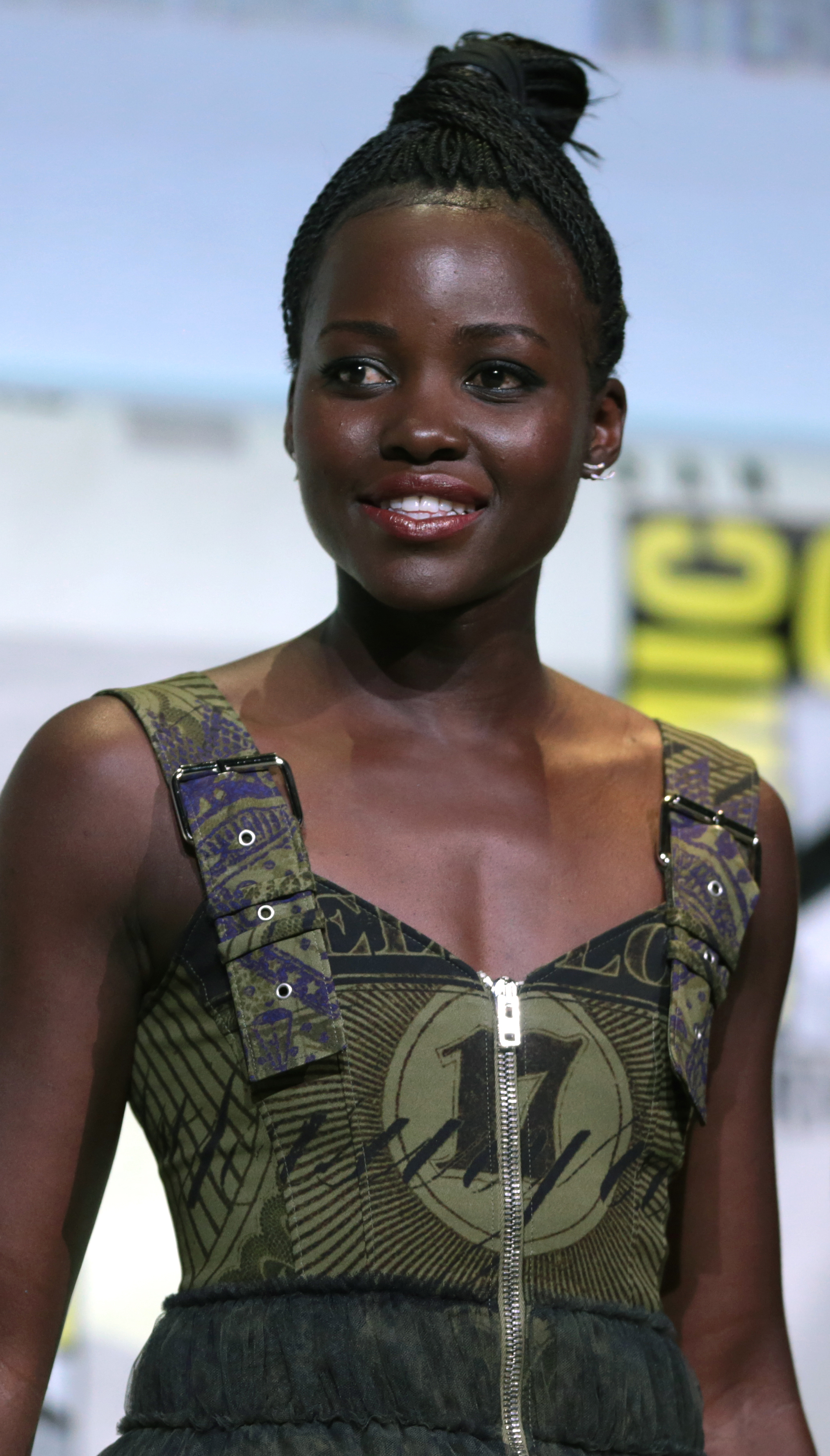
Lupita Nyong'o portrays Maz.

Nyong'o's meeting with Abrams about an undisclosed role was reported in March 2014, and her casting in the film was first announced on April 29, 2014. Nyong'o was revealed to be playing a performance capture-CGI character, pirate Maz Kanata, in a May 2015 Vanity Fair photo shoot by Annie Leibovitz. The character was first heard in the official TV spot for The Force Awakens, released in November 2015. Days later Abrams confirmed fan speculation that Maz was pictured on the film's theatrical poster, which had been previously released in October 2015, as a diminutive alien wearing large goggles. In December 2015, the orange-skinned character appeared briefly in a video for the Disney XD channel, featuring a scene in which John Boyega's character Finn draws his lightsaber.

Of Abrams' emphasis on the character's eyes, Nyong'o commented, "As an actor for films, your eyes are a lot of the way you communicate anyway. So it was definitely a gift to have that be the means to her magic as a motion-capture character." Nyong'o was also coached on performance-capture work by her The Force Awakens costar Andy Serkis, who portrays CGI character Supreme Leader Snoke and had previously portrayed numerous other motion-capture roles in other films. She said, "The biggest advice he gave me, that was so important to hold on to, is a motion-capture character you develop the same way as any other. You have to understand who the character is and what makes them who they are."

Actress Arti Shah was cast as the motion capture double for the character's body movements.

=== Description ===
Maz is a diminutive, humanoid alien with orange-tinted skin who wears large goggles. A former pirate and smuggler, she runs an interstellar tavern in a castle on the planet Takodana. Abrams said of her backstory:

Her history is that she was a pirate for a long time. She's lived over a thousand years. She's had this watering hole for about a century, and it's like another bar that you'd find in a corner of the Star Wars universe.

Abrams added that "her eyes are an important aspect of her character". Entertainment Weekly's Anthony Breznican noted, "Maz is this movie's wise, ancient alien with connections to the mystical side of the galaxy." Of the character's alien species and planetary origins, Abrams said that though The Force Awakens does not answer these questions, more information about Maz is forthcoming "in other venues".

== Appearances ==
=== Film ===
==== The Force Awakens (2015) ====
In the film, Han Solo visits his old friend Maz at her tavern, seeking her aid in returning the wayward astromech droid BB-8 to the Resistance. Maz, who has a crush on Han's copilot, the Wookiee Chewbacca, is intrigued by Han's companions, the renegade stormtrooper Finn (FN-2187) and the scavenger Rey. First Order stormtroopers, led by Kylo Ren, attack Maz's castle in search of BB-8, who has been entrusted with an important map. Maz tries to give Luke Skywalker's long-missing lightsaber to the Force-sensitive Rey, but she refuses it after experiencing a disturbing vision from touching it. Maz then entrusts the lightsaber to Finn, who uses it multiple times before it is eventually claimed by Rey. It is still unknown how Maz found the lightsaber after it was supposedly lost forever in Star Wars: The Empire Strikes Back.

===== Deleted scene =====
One trailer for the film included a shot of Maz handing Luke's lightsaber to General Leia Organa, though the corresponding scene was not included in the final cut of the film. Abrams explained the removal, saying "Maz used to continue along with the characters back to the Resistance base, but we realized that she really had nothing to do there of value, except to be sitting around."

==== The Last Jedi (2017) ====
In December 2015, producer Kathleen Kennedy confirmed that Nyong'o was among those who would reprise their roles in the forthcoming sequel to The Force Awakens, Star Wars: The Last Jedi.

In the film, Maz appears in one brief scene via hologram, aiding Poe Dameron, Finn and Rose Tico by instructing them to find the Master Codebreaker in Canto Bight. She is shown in the midst of a firefight, which she calls "a union dispute".

==== The Rise of Skywalker (2019) ====
Maz appears in a minor role in Star Wars: The Rise of Skywalker, with Nyong'o reprising the role. She is shown being a part of the Resistance, helping them prepare for war. She is present in most scenes with Leia, who appeared using unused footage from The Force Awakens; Maz's main purpose in the film is to explain Leia's actions and mourn her upon her death. In the celebrations at the end of the film, Maz gives Chewbacca Han's old medal, a callback to the final scene of A New Hope in which Luke and Han received awards and Chewbacca did not.

=== Animated series ===
==== Lego Star Wars (2016) ====
Maz appears in the short form animated series Lego Star Wars: The Resistance Rises in the 2016 episode "Hunting for Han". The character also appeared in the Lego Star Wars: The Freemaker Adventures episode The Test.

==== Forces of Destiny (2017) ====
Maz appears in the micro-series Star Wars Forces of Destiny, voiced by Lupita Nyong'o.

=== Video games ===
Maz is a playable character in Lego Star Wars: The Force Awakens. Her role in the game is basically the same as in the film, although she has a prominent role during the battle of Takodana (in Chapter 6).

Maz also appears in Star Wars: Battlefront 2, being in the campaign. She helps Han Solo by giving him information.

=== Merchandising ===
Maz is featured in a Lego Star Wars playset called Battle on Takodana, and Hasbro's Star Wars: The Force Awakens Takodana Encounter action figure set. The character also appears in the 2015 novelization of The Force Awakens by Alan Dean Foster.

== Reception ==
Time's Stephanie Zacharek described Maz as "a delightful minor character ... who looks like the love child of E.T. and Lena Horne". Richard Roeper of the Chicago Sun-Times named Maz one of the film's "miraculous creatures", and James Robins of the New Zealand Listener deemed the character "a charmingly rendered alien". Writing for Forbes, Scott Mendelson called the scenes at Maz's castle "the film's best sequence".

Conversely, Matt Goldberg of Collider described the character as "the bar-owner/Yoda stand-in/exposition mouthpiece" and wrote, "What could have been a strong addition to the franchise instead reeks of the film's attempt to mimic what works well in the previous movies."

The Force Awakens received seven Visual Effects Society Award nominations, including one for Outstanding Animated Performance in a Photoreal Feature for Maz Kanata. Nyong'o was nominated for a 2016 Saturn Award for Best Supporting Actress for her portrayal.
