= Niamh Wilson =

Canadian actress

- Born: March 9, 1997 (age 29); Oakville, Ontario, Canada
- Occupation: Actress
- Years active: 2003–present

Niamh Wilson (/niːv/; born March 9, 1997) is a Canadian film and television actress from Toronto, Ontario, known for her role as Lydia in Grease: Rise of the Pink Ladies as well as Jacqueline "Jack" Jones on Degrassi: The Next Generation during seasons 13 and 14. As a child actor, she played notable characters like Corbett in Saw III, reprised in Saw V; Little Claire and Rose in the Canadian horror film The Marsh (2006); and the title role in the Family Channel series Debra!

Wilson's career has spanned over two decades; working with multiple academy award winning filmmakers such as David Cronenberg, Jean-Pierre Jeunet, and Forest Whitaker, as well as the likes of Helena Bonham-Carter, and Kyle Machlachlan.

== Career ==
Wilson began her career with a role in the Warner Brother's pilot Chasing Alice at the age of five. Although the TV Movie/pilot did not result in a series, she did meet Ralph Hemecker, who was to direct her in Haunting Sarah two years later. Her portrayal of Sarah Lewis garnered her a Young Artist Award in 2006. While in Los Angeles for the awards she and her mother created a CBC Radio radio documentary for the Outfront program called "Child Star Goes to Hollywood" about their road trip to Hollywood. Wilson was cast in Ice Planet as Commander Trager's (Michael Ironside) daughter. She has appeared in numerous films as well as episodic television, generally in dramatic adult-oriented vehicles; however, a comedic role eluded her until she was cast in the title role of Debra Delong in the Family Channel series Debra! produced by Cookie Jar Entertainment. The role was cast in 2010 when Wilson was only 12 years old. The pilot was shot in spring 2010; Family Channel picked up the series in summer 2010. and the first season was filmed in January - February 2011. The first episode premiered on Family Channel Saturday, June 4, 2011. Wilson won the Young Artist Award for Leading Actress in a TV Series for Debra! In May 2012, the series also won for Best Young Ensemble in a TV Series. This was the first time a TV series that was not aired in the United States had won these awards. They were also in Grease: Rise of the Pink Ladies as a character named Lydia.

== Personal life ==
Like her character on Degrassi, Jack Jones, Wilson is a dancer, practicing mainly in ballet, modern contemporary, and pointe. Wilson graduated from high school in June 2015 and attended George Brown College in Toronto, Ontario. She was accepted into their dance program for Technical and Performance Training in Ballet. As of 2018, Wilson was pursuing an anthropology major at the University of Toronto.

In 2023, she published a first-person piece in the Toronto Star about her journey as a queer person.

Niamh Wilson uses all pronouns.

== Filmography ==
=== Film ===
Year	Title	Role	Notes
2005	Aurora Borealis	Isabelle	
2006	The Marsh	Little Claire / Rose	
2006	Saw III	Corbett Denlon	
2007	Saw IV	Corbett Denlon	
2008	Saw V	Corbett Denlon	
2009	Saw VI	Corbett Denlon	Uncredited cameo in director's cut; post-credits scene
2013	The Young and Prodigious T. S. Spivet	Gracie	
2013	Skating to New York	Page	
2014	Maps to the Stars	Sam	
2018	Giant Little Ones	Mouse	
2019	All About Who You Know	Haley	
2019	Random Acts of Violence	Aurora	

=== Television ===
Year	Title	Role	Notes
2003	Chasing Alice	Young Alice	TV film
2005	Plague City: SARS in Toronto	Lindsay	TV film
2005	Haunting Sarah	Sarah Lewis	TV film
2006	The House Next Door	Belinda Greene	TV film
2006–2008	Runaway	Susie	Recurring role; 7 episodes
2007	They Come Back	Marley Charles	TV film
2009	Flashpoint	Petra	Episode: "Haunting the Barn"
2009	Heartland	Taylor Kennedy	Episode: "Little Secrets"
2011	Falling Skies	Megan	Episodes: "Sanctuary: Part 1", "Eight Hours"
2011	Haven	Hadley Chambers	Episode: "Silent Night"
2011–2012	Debra!	Debra	Lead role; 13 episodes
2012	Frenemies	Brittany	TV film
2012	My Babysitter's a Vampire	Val Mudrap	Episode: "Village of the Darned"
2012	Warehouse 13	Alice	Episode: "Fractures"
2012	Rookie Blue	Alice	Episodes: "The First Day of the Rest of Your Life", "I Never"
2013	Hemlock Grove	Pretty Shelley	Episodes: "Birth", "Catabasis", "What Peter Can Live Without"
2014–2015	Degrassi: The Next Generation	Jacqueline "Jack" Jones	Main role (Seasons 13–14); 23 Episodes
2015	Good Witch	Amber	Episodes: "Starting Over...Again", "Do The Right Thing"
2015	Between	Lana	3 Episodes
2017	Early Release	Bianca Reynolds	TV film
2021	I Was Lorena Bobbitt	Teri	TV film
2023	Grease: Rise of the Pink Ladies	Lydia	Recurring Role

=== Music videos ===
Year	Title	Artist	Notes	Reference
2017	Working for the Future in the Interlake	Yes We Mystic	Choreographer	

== Awards ==
Year	Award	Category	Work	Result
2006	Young Artist Award	Best Performance in a MOW - Supporting Young Actress	Haunting Sarah	Won
2007	Young Artist Award	Best Performance in a MOW - Supporting Young Actress	The House Next Door	Nominated
2008	Young Artist Award	Best Performance in a MOW - Leading Young Actress	They Come Back	Nominated
2012	Young Artist Award	Best Performance in a TV Series - Leading Young Actress	Debra!	Won
2012	Young Artist Award	Outstanding Young Ensemble In a TV Series	Debra!	Won
2016	Young Artist Award	Best Performance in a Feature Film - Supporting Young Actress	The Young and Prodigious T.S. Spivet	Won
