= The Big Slice =

- Directed by: John Bradshaw
- Written by: John Bradshaw
- Produced by: Nicolas Stiliadis
- Starring: Casey Siemaszko; Leslie Hope; Louis Ferreira; Kenneth Welsh; Heather Locklear; Henry Ramer; Brian Kaulback; Ellen Dubin
- Cinematography: Ludek Bogner
- Edited by: Nick Rotundo
- Music by: Jeff Danna; Mychael Danna
- Release date: June 1991
- Running time: 90 minutes
- Countries: United States; Canada
- Language: English

The Big Slice is a 1991 American and Canadian comedy film directed by John Bradshaw. This film starring Casey Siemaszko, Leslie Hope, Louis Ferreira, Kenneth Welsh and Heather Locklear in the lead roles.

== Plot ==
Two journalists go deep undercover in order to write a book about crime.

== Cast ==
- Casey Siemaszko as Mike Sawyer
- Leslie Hope as Jenny Colter
- Louis Ferreira as Andy McCafferty
- Kenneth Welsh as Lieutenant Bernard
- Heather Locklear as Rita
- Henry Ramer as Max Bernstein
- Brian Kaulback as Prison Guard
- Ellen Dubin as TV Reporter
- Nicholas Campbell as Nick Papadopoulos
