= The Wives He Forgot =

- Genre: Comedy; Drama; Mystery
- Written by: J.J. Jamieson
- Directed by: Mario Azzopardi
- Starring: Molly Ringwald; Mark Humphrey; Shannon Sturges
- Music by: Eric Cadesky
- Country of origin: Canada
- Original language: English

Production
- Executive producers: Stephen P. Jarchow; Ira Levy; James Veres
- Producers: J.J. Jamieson; Paula Smith; Peter Williamson; Kirsten Scollie
- Cinematography: Michael Storey
- Editor: Mike Lee
- Production companies: Breakthrough Entertainment; Breakthrough Films and Television; Regent Entertainment; Heartstone Films
- Budget: $2,000,000 (estimated)

Original release
- Network: LMN
- Release: 10 September 2006

The Wives He Forgot is a 2006 film written and produced by J.J. Jamieson, directed by Mario Azzopardi and starring Molly Ringwald as Charlotte Saint John, a small town attorney, who comes to the aid of Gabriel (Mark Humphrey), a handsome stranger who's suffering from amnesia. Charlotte can't help but fall in love with this seemingly perfect man. Their romance soon hits a snag when two women come into Charlotte's office claiming that they are married to Gabriel, whose real name is Jay. When Jay is charged with bigamy, Charlotte decides to defend him in court.

== Cast ==
- Molly Ringwald as Charlotte Saint John
- Mark Humphrey as Gabriel/Jay Miller
- Shannon Sturges as Gillian Mathers
- Maxim Roy as Alicia Miller
- Ellen Dubin as Gwen
- Lara Azzopardi as Mina Truman
