= Silent Predators =

1999 American television film

- DVD cover
- Directed by: Noel Nosseck
- Written by: John Carpenter; William S. Gilmore; Matt Dorff
- Story by: Patricia Arrigoni; Fred Brown
- Produced by: Richard D. Arredondo; Randy Sutter
- Starring: Harry Hamlin; Shannon Sturges; David Spielberg; Patty McCormack; Beau Billingslea; Tom Betts
- Cinematography: John Stokes
- Edited by: Tod Feuerman
- Music by: Michael Tavera
- Distributed by: TBS Superstation
- Release date: June 13, 1999
- Running time: 91 minutes
- Country: United States
- Language: English

Silent Predators is a 1999 American horror television film directed by Noel Nosseck and starring Harry Hamlin and Shannon Sturges.

== Plot ==
After a truck carrying a rare species of tropical rattlesnake crashes, the snakes escape into the wild. Twenty years later the snakes have bred with native rattlesnakes to create a highly aggressive and lethal new species that begin to slowly overrun the southern California town of San Vicente. After the deaths of several residents of a housing development, local fire chief Vic Rondelli tries to convince the city government that the snakes are a serious threat despite opposition from Max Farrington, a land developer more interested in finishing his work than the people's safety.

== Cast ==
- Harry Hamlin as Vic Rondelli
- Shannon Sturges as Mandy Stratford
- David Spielberg as Mayor Parker
- Patty McCormack as Vera Conrad
- Beau Billingslea as George Mitchell
- Phillip Troy Linger as Dr. Matthew Watkins
- Jack Scalia as Max Farrington
- Paul Tassone as Stranded Motorist
- Dominic Purcell as Truck Driver

== Production ==
Silent Predators was based on a script John Carpenter wrote in the 1970s. Principal photography occurred in Queensland, Australia, and Los Angeles, California.

== Reception ==
Silent Predators received generally unfavorable reviews from critics, who criticized almost every aspect of the movie. Michael Speier of Variety called the film "absurdly unrealistic and dramatically inept", stating: "'Predators' is visually unspectacular, and the scare tactics are buried beneath Michael Tavera's heavy-handed score and some poorly realized jump-cut editing from Tod Feuerman".
