= The Marsh (2006 film) =

- Directed by: Jordan Barker
- Written by: Michael Stokes
- Produced by: Peter R. Simpson; George Flak
- Starring: Gabrielle Anwar; Justin Louis; Forest Whitaker
- Cinematography: David Perrault
- Edited by: Nick Rotundo
- Music by: Eric Cadesky; Nick Dyer
- Production companies: Norstar Filmed Entertainment; Sonja Productions; Chum Television
- Distributed by: Alliance Atlantis Communications (Canada); Sony Pictures Releasing (International)
- Release date: May 18, 2006
- Country: Canada
- Language: English
- Budget: $7 million
- Box office: $2,408,452

The Marsh is a 2006 horror film directed by Jordan Barker and written by Michael Stokes. It stars Gabrielle Anwar as a children's book author haunted by a recurring nightmare and Forest Whitaker as a paranormal investigator she enlists to help her.

== Plot ==
Successful children's author Claire Holloway (Gabrielle Anwar) is troubled by nightmares, for which she is seeing a psychiatrist. While watching television, she sees the Rose Marsh Farm in Westmoreland County, which resembles a location in her nightmares. She decides to spend her vacation at the farm, which is located near a swamp. She is haunted by the ghosts of a little girl (Niamh Wilson) and a teenage boy inside the house. She befriends local newspaper publisher and historian Noah Pitney (Justin Louis). After more disturbing visions, she contacts paranormal consultant Geoffrey Hunt (Forest Whitaker). Together they investigate the farm and uncover a tragedy that happened there twenty years earlier.

== Cast ==
- Gabrielle Anwar as Claire Holloway
- Justin Louis as Noah Pitney
- Forest Whitaker as Geoffrey Hunt
- Peter MacNeill as Philip Manville
- Niamh Wilson as Little Claire/Rose
- Joe Dinicol as Brendan Manville
- Brooke Johnson as Mercy
- Kenner Ames as Ernie
- Jessica Greco as Teen Mercy
- Ryan Giesen as Teen Pitney
- Bill MacDonald as Dr. Wells

== Release ==
The film had limited theatrical release. It was first released in May 2006; on October 21, 2006, it was screened at the Screamfest Horror Film Festival in Los Angeles.
