= Marco Greco (actor) =

- Born: Marco Michael Greco; The Bronx, New York, U.S.
- Occupations: Actor, writer, artist

Marco Greco is an American actor and playwright. His Off-Broadway play, Behind the Counter with Mussolini, won a CableACE award in 1997. He was honored by the Bronx County Historical Society in 2013, with the Poe Award for his contributions to the arts. Greco is the co-founder and former executive director of the Belmont Italian American Playhouse.

== Filmography ==
=== Film ===
| Year | Title | Role | Notes |
|---|---|---|---|
| 1996 | Sleepers | Waiter | |
| 1998 | Getting Personal | Man at Accident | |
| 2000 | Fallen Arches | Ronnie Sparks | |
| 2001 | Hannibal | Tommaso | |
| 2003 | Killer Rats | Kevin | |
| 2008 | Dough Boys | Jimmy | |
| 2009 | Angels & Demons | Fireman | |
| 2014 | House at the End of the Drive | Rich | |
| 2019 | The Irishman | Grocer | |
| 2023 | The Untitled Cabrini Film | Consul Riva | |
| TBA | The Jury | Juror #3 | |

=== Television ===
| Year | Title | Role | Notes |
|---|---|---|---|
| 1996, 1997 | Law & Order | Jackson / Skeeze | 2 episodes |
| 2015 | For the Defense | Chachi Giannino | Television film |
| 2018 | Jessica Jones | Security Guard | Episode: "A.K.A. Start at the Beginning" |
| 2022 | Crash the System | Dr. Jerenberg | 4 episodes |
