= Peter Onorati =

American actor (born 1953)

- Born: May 16, 1953 (age 73); Boonton, New Jersey, U.S.
- Occupation: Actor
- Years active: 1986–present
- Spouse: Jeanette Collins (m. 1988)
- Children: 3

Peter Onorati (born May 16, 1953) is an American actor. He is known for his TV roles as Charlie Howell on Civil Wars (1991–1993), Mr. Scotto on Murder One (1995–1997), Stanley Pearson on This Is Us (2017–2022), and Jeffrey Mumford on S.W.A.T. (2017–2019), and his film roles in Goodfellas (1990), and Fallen Arches (1998).

== Early life and education ==
Onorati was born and raised in Boonton, New Jersey to Italian parents and attended Boonton High School and Lycoming College.

== Filmography ==
=== Film ===
Year	Title	Role	Notes
1987	Firehouse	Ron J. Sleek	
1988	Scrooged		
1989	Mortal Sins	Diduch	
1990	Fire Birds	Rice	
1990	Goodfellas	Florida Bookie	
1990	Postcards from the Edge	Cameraman	
1994	Camp Nowhere	Karl Dell	
1995	Not Like Us	Sam Clark	
1997	RocketMan	Gary Hackman	
1998	Shelter	Demetrie Kostantinos	
1998	True Friends	Alphonse	
1998	Tycus	Jake	
1999	Just Looking	Phil De Lorenzo	
1999	The Art of Murder	Willie Kassel	
2000	Fallen Arches	Charlie	
2000	Lured Innocence	Maxwell Strong	
2000	Dancing in September	Mel	
2000	Pedestrian		
2001	Ordinary Sinner	Mike	
2005	Inside Out	Rocco	
2005	Blood Deep	Repairman	
2005	Jesus, Mary and Joey	Jamie	
2006	All In	T.D.	
2006	El Cortez	Carlo Russo	
2006	Price to Pay	Mr. Martin	
2009	The House That Jack Built	Jack Flice 'Grandpa Jack'	
2010	Circle	Chief	
2011	Coming & Going	Mr. D	
2011	Ghost Phone: Phone Calls from the Dead	Detective Wilder	
2013	West End	Uncle John	
2014	#Stuck	Holly's Dad	
2014	Homecoming	Repairman Pete	
2015	Batman vs. Robin	Draco	Voice, direct-to-video
2020	Twisted Twin	Detective Moreno	
2020	The Last Champion	Frank Stevens	

=== Television ===
Year	Title	Role	Notes
1986	ABC Afterschool Special		Episode: "Wanted: The Perfect Guy"; uncredited
1989	Quantum Leap	Rick	Episode: "Disco Inferno - April 1, 1976"
1988–1989	Kate & Allie	Lou Carello	Main cast (season 6)
1990	Cop Rock	Det. Vincent LaRusso	Main cast
1991–1993	Civil Wars	Charlie Howell	Main cast
1993	With Hostile Intent	Sgt. Harry McCarthy	Television film
1993	River of Rage: The Taking of Maggie Keene	Kim	Television film
1993	Joe's Life	Joe Gennaro	Main role
1994	Tales from the Crypt	Carl Schlag	Episode: "Only Skin Deep"
1994	Under Suspicion	Det. Frank Fusco	Episode: "Pilot"
1994	Good Advice	Joey	Episode: "Divorce, Egyptian Style"
1995	Donor Unknown	Nick Stillman	Television film
1995–1997	Murder One	Mr. Scotto	6 episodes
1996	Dead Ahead	Frank Cacey	Television film
1997	The Outer Limits	Frank Martin	Episode: "Last Supper"
1997	Temporarily Yours	Carson	Episode: "In the Same Boat"
1997	NYPD Blue	Joey Salvo	3 episodes
1997	Michael Hayes	Priest	Episode: "Act of Contrition"
1998	Nash Bridges	Edward C. Rand	Episode: "Mystery Dance"
2000	Touched by an Angel	Martin	Episode: "A House Divided"
2000	The Pretender	Roland Pritchard	Episode: "Lifeline"
2000	The Wild Thornberrys	Pava	Voice, episode: "Pack of Thornberrys"
2000	Batman Beyond	Rex Stewart / Warhawk, Ozzie	Voice, 3 episodes
2000	The Huntress	Detective Hodes	Episode: "The Kid"
2000	Walker, Texas Ranger	Sgt. Vincent Rosetti	4 episodes
2000	Disappearing Acts	Construction foreman	Television film; uncredited
2000–2001	Sheena	Tyler	2 episodes
2001	ER	Off. Nick Napolitano	Episode: "Rampage"
2001	Family Law	Richard Sullivan	Episode: "Safe at Home"
2001	The Fugitive	Walter Dinwiddie	Episode: "Götterdämmerung"
2001	FreakyLinks	Captain Kendall	Episode: "Subject: Police Siren"
2001	Sex and the City	The Wrestling Coach	Episode: "My Motherboard, My Self"
2001	Crossing Jordan	Detective Benza	Episode: "The Ties That Bind"
2001	Leap Years	Russ Adler	4 episodes
2002	Providence	Mike O'Brien	Episode: "Shadow Play"
2002	The Zeta Project	Blake	Voice, episode: "The Wrong Morph"
2002	Monk	Archie Modine	Episode: "Mr. Monk and the Billionaire Mugger"
2002–2004	American Dreams	Dom	8 episodes
2003	NCIS	Chief of the Boat	Episode: "Sub Rosa"
2004	The Last Ride	Burt Walling	Television film
2004	Man in the Mirror: The Michael Jackson Story	Ziggy	Television film
2004	JAG	Brett Orman	Episode: "Camp Delta"
2004–2005	Justice League Unlimited	B'wana Beast, Rex Stewart / Warhawk	Voice, 3 episodes
2005	Eyes	Joe Carlisle	Episode: "Wings"
2005	Teen Titans	Robotman	Voice, episode: "Homecoming"
2005	CSI: NY	Angelo Venetti Sr.	Episode: "Zoo York"
2005	Ghost Whisperer	Anthony Masters	Episode: "Shadow Boxer"
2006	Las Vegas	Lamar	Episode: "Cash Springs Eternal"
2006	Conviction	Police Detective	Episode: "The Wall"
2007	Numbers	Alfred McGurn	Episode: "In Security"
2007–2009	Everybody Hates Chris	Janitor, Coach Brantley (twins)	5 episodes
2008	Desperate Housewives	Warren Schilling	2 episodes
2009	24	Agent Remick	2 episodes
2009	Cold Case	Ray Bianchi '09	Episode: "Chinatown"
2010	Batman: The Brave and the Bold	Joe Chill	Voice, episode: "Chill of the Night!"
2010	The Glades	Graig Daniels	Episode: “Marriage is Murder”
2011	Castle	Sal Malavolta	Episode: "Slice of Death"
2012	The Big Bang Theory	Angelo	Episode: "The Werewolf Transformation"
2012	CSI: Crime Scene Investigation	Det. Paul Kimball	2 episodes
2012	Sons of Anarchy	Leo Pirelli	Episode: "Andare Pescare"
2013	Blue Bloods	Vince D'Amato	Episode: "Loss of Faith"
2014	The Exes	Frank	Episode: "Dawn of the Dad"
2014	Murder in the First	Jimmy Salter	Recurring role (season 1)
2014	2 Broke Girls	Nicky	Episode: "And the Free Money"
2017–2022	This Is Us	Stanley Pearson	Guest (seasons 1–2, 4, 6), recurring role (seasons 3, 5)
2017–2019, 2021, 2024	S.W.A.T.	Jeff "Jack" Mumford	Main cast (season 1), recurring role (season 2), guest role (season 4)
2020	Station 19	Snuffy Souza	3 episodes
2020	Mom	Wayne	Episode: "Somebody's Grandmother and the A-List"
2021	The Rookie	Officer Jerry McGrady	Episode: "Poetic Justice"

=== Videogames ===
Year	Title	Role	Notes
1999	Lands of Lore III	Dungeon Ruloi, Punktchen the Guard, Stewart the Orc	Voice
