= Shannon Sturges =

American actress and acting coach (born 1968)

- Born: January 3, 1968 (age 58); Ventura, California, U.S.
- Occupation: Actress
- Years active: 1985–present
- Spouse: Michael Kelley (m. 1993)
- Children: 2
- Relatives: Preston Sturges (grandfather)

Shannon Sturges (born January 3, 1968) is an American actress and acting coach, best known for her role as Reese Burton in The WB primetime soap opera Savannah.

== Life and career ==
Sturges is the daughter of actor Solomon Sturges and actress Colette Jackson, and granddaughter of director and screenwriter Preston Sturges. Her mother died on 15 May 1969. She graduated from the University of California, Los Angeles, and later began her career on television and film. She has two children with her husband. Jack Enzo Kelley and Ethan Robert Kelley.

Sturges played Molly Brinker on Days of Our Lives from 1991 to 1992. In 1995, she starred in the ABC drama series Extreme, the series was cancelled after only seven episodes. In 1996, Sturges was cast as the lead in Aaron Spelling primetime soap opera Savannah alongside Jamie Luner. She was listed in People's 1996 Most Beautiful People edition. The show was a hit in the first season, but dipped in the ratings in the second season and was cancelled in May 1997.

Sturges later starred in number of made for television movies, like Tornado! (1996), Terror in the Mall (1998), Silent Predators (1999), The Perfect Wife (2001), Maid of Honor (2006), Cradle of Lies (2006) and The Wives He Forgot (2006). She also has made guest appearances on shows such as Walker, Texas Ranger, Charmed, Once and Again, Boomtown, Cold Case, Nip/Tuck and well played recurring roles on Passions and Port Charles. In 2012 she joined the cast of River Ridge as Blythe Jensen.

== Filmography ==
- Doogie Howser, M.D. as Sandi (1 episode, 1990)
- Brotherhood of the Gun (1991)
- Desire and Hell at Sunset Motel (1991) as Louella
- Days of Our Lives as Molly Brinker (1991-1992)
- One Stormy Night (1992) as Molly Brinker
- Herman's Head as The Waitress (1 episode, 1994)
- Mr. Write (1994) as Rachel
- Walker, Texas Ranger as Linda Lee Robbins (1 episode, 1994)
- Vanishing Son (1 episode, 1995)
- Two Guys Talkin' About Girls (1995) as Cindy Four
- Prima Donnas (1995) as Kim Sterling
- Tornado! (1996) as Samantha 'Sam' Callen
- Savannah as Reese Burton (34 episodes, 1996-1997)
- Life with Roger as Nicole (1 episode, 1997)
- Convict 762 (1997) as Nile
- Terror in the Mall (1998) as The Dr. Sheri Maratos
- Love Boat: The Next Wave as Rita (1 episode, 1998)
- Brimstone as Jocelyn Paige (1 episode, 1999
- Charmed as Helena Statler (1 episode, 1999)
- Silent Predators (1999) as Mandy Stratford
- Once and Again as Ronnie (2 episodes, 2000-2001)
- The Perfect Wife (2001) as Leah Tyman/Liza Steward
- Boomtown as Cherie Hechler (1 episode, 2002)
- Port Charles as Kate Reynolds (2002-2003)
- S.W.A.T. (2003) as Mrs. Segerstrom
- Passions as Sheridan Crane (2005)
- Maid of Honor (2006) as Nicole Harris
- Cradle of Lies (2006) as Haley Collins
- The Wives He Forgot (2006) as Gillian Mathers
- Cold Case as Melanie Campbell (1 episode, 2006)
- A Christmas Proposal (2008) as Cassidy
- Ambition to Meaning: Finding Your Life's Purpose (2009) as Quinn Harper
- Nip/Tuck as Mrs. Brett (1 episode, 2009)
- River Ridge as Blythe Jensen (2012)
- The Mentalist as Susan Fitzgerald (1 episode, 2014)
