= Ellen Dubin =

Canadian actress

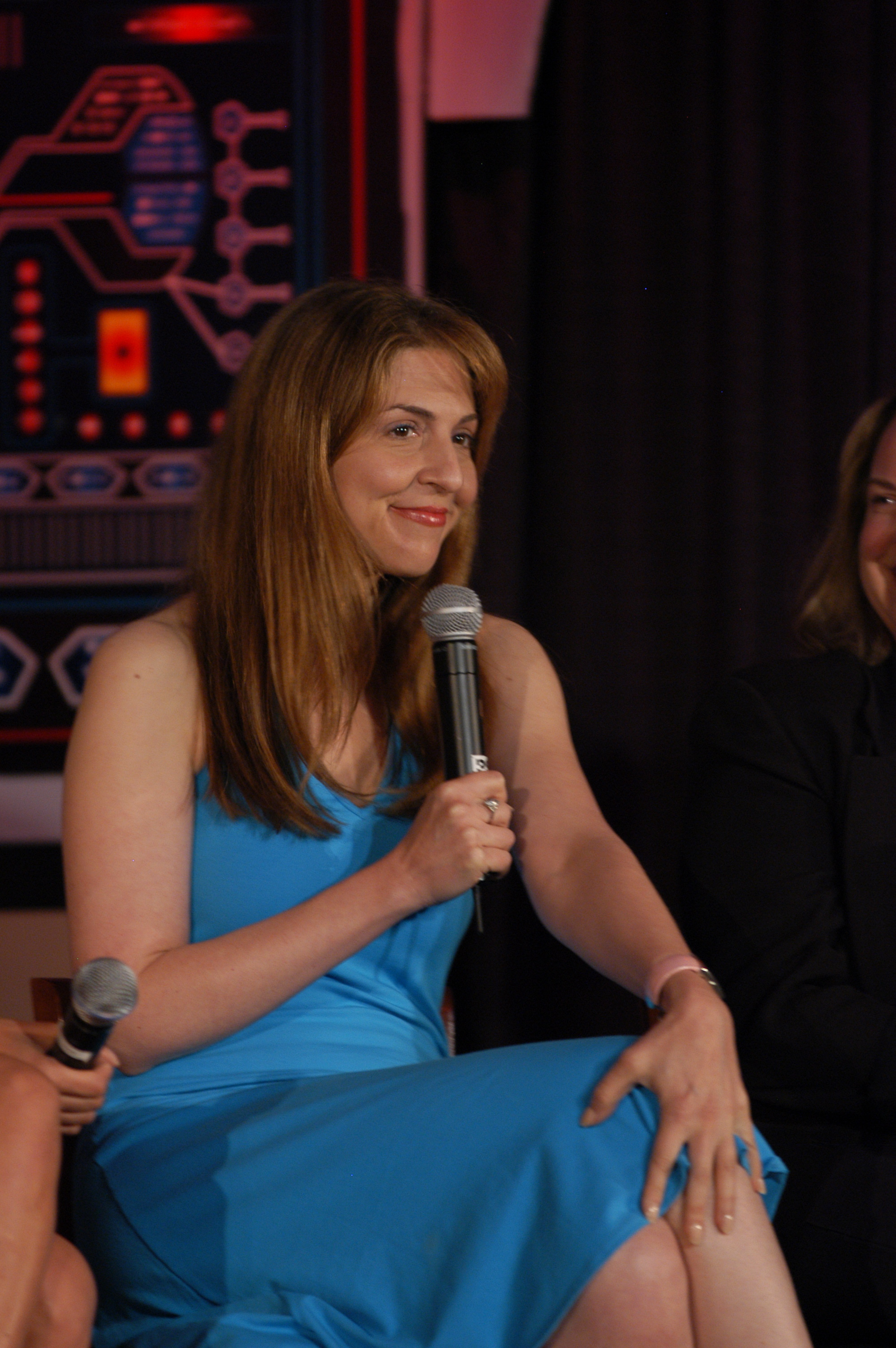
- Dubin at the Gatecon 2005 convention in Vancouver (Canada).
- Born: August 27; Toronto, Ontario, Canada
- Occupation: Actress
- Years active: 1986–present
- Known for: Giggerota in Lexx
- Spouse: Jay Switzer (m. 1988; died 2018)
- Website: http://www.ellendubin.com

Ellen Dubin is a Canadian actress. She is best known for her role as Giggerota in the science fiction series Lexx. She has had many live action and voice roles in film and television, appearing in prominent films such as Napoleon Dynamite and Midway.

== Early life ==
Ellen Dubin was born in Toronto, Canada to Rose and Carl Dubin. She originally wanted to be a ballet dancer, before a knee injury made her pivot to acting. She began her career in theatre, acting in a production of Fiddler on the Roof, and attended the University of Toronto.

== Career ==
Dubin moved to Los Angeles to advance her acting career, but continued to work both there and in her native Canada. After a series of guest roles in television series, Dubin portrayed the cannibal Giggerotta in the Canadian-German science fiction series Lexx, beginning in two of the four television films that began the series. She reprised her role in a recurring capacity in the three seasons that followed. From 2004 to 2006 she starred in the television series The Collector as Jeri Slate. She was nominated for a Gemini Award for this role. She also made a guest appearance in Gene Roddenberry's Earth: Final Conflict as well as a number of other series. In 2004 Dubin appeared in Napoleon Dynamite. In 2006 she appeared in the TV movie The Wives He Forgot with Molly Ringwald and Mark Humphrey. In 2019 she had a role in Roland Emmerich's war film Midway.

Dubin is also an accomplished voice actress. She voiced Captain Phasma in Lego Star Wars: The Resistance Rises , Star Wars Resistance. "(Fortnite)" Lori in the English dub of Sailor Moon, and the Bene Gesserit Ancestor in the film Dune. She has lent her voice to several video games, including The Elder Scrolls V: Skyrim, "(Skyrim)", "(League of Legends)", "(Guild Wars 2)" Fallout 4. Also was the welcoming voice of the 60th anniversary of Disneyland and the World of Color at California Adventureland. She was the home AI Elsie in both " (M3GAN )" and "(Soulm8TE)".

== Personal life ==
Dubin was the spokesperson for the Make-a-Wish Foundation in Toronto and Central Ontario. She was married to Canadian media executive Jay Switzer from 1988 until his death in 2018.

== Filmography ==
=== Film ===
Year	Title	Role	Notes
1990	Abraxas, Guardian of the Universe	First Waitress	
1991	The Big Slice	TV Reporter	
1993	Baby on Board	Saleslady	
1993	Cold Sweat	Louise	
1994	Tammy and the T-Rex	Helga	
1995	Scanners: The Showdown	Cop #1	
1995	The Donor	Sue	
1996	Never Too Late	Carolyn	
2000	Alone with a Stranger	Wendy	
2000	Tunnel	Megan	
2004	Napoleon Dynamite	Ilene	
2008	Bull	Dr. Piri	
2009	Lost and Found	Lise	Short film
2012	A Turtle's Tale 2: Sammy's Escape from Paradise	Doris (voice)	
2012	Dead Before Dawn	Beverly Galloway	
2013	Hit It	Ellen	
2013	Real Gangsters	Mary Gale Kelly	
2014	The Big Fat Stone	Tilly Sanduski	
2014	Backlash	Ms. Karyn	Short film
2015	No Deposit	Judy Ryan	
2015	La Trattoria Sitcom	Angie the Waitress	Television film
2015	Sicilian Vampire	Vince's Mistress	
2016	The Red Maple Leaf	Marie MacDonald	
2016	Girl Knight	Mother	Short film
2016	The Red Maple Leaf	Marie MacDonald	
2017	Nobility	Col. Theia	
2019	Midway	Admiral King Secretary	
2020	The Crimes That Bind	Alicia (voice, English dub)	
2020	Rising High	Liebholz (voice, English dub)	
2021	Dune	Bene Gesserit Ancestor	Voice
2021	The Desperate Hour	Sergeant Brandt (voice)	
2021	Together Together	Anna's Mother (voice)	
2022	M3GAN	Elsie (voice)	
2022	Trader	Mrs. Hamilton (voice)	
2023	Cobweb	The Girl	
2025	Death Before the Wedding	Karolina (voice, English dub)	

=== Television ===
Year	Title	Role	Notes
1986, 1987	Check it Out!	Judy / Juanita	2 episodes
1989	Lantern Hill	Charlotte Simpson	Television film
1990	Personals	Officer Andretti	Television film
1990	Counterstrike	Tour Guide	Episode: "Masks" (S1.E16)
1990, 1993	E.N.G.	Secretary / Debbie	2 episodes
1991	False Arrest	Judy McKinney	Television film
1992	Counterstrike	Cindy	Episode: "Death SEAL" (S3.E8)
1992	In the Deep Woods	Manager #2	Television film
1992, 1995	Forever Knight	Mistress Tamara Dungan / Ingrid Marr	2 episodes
1993	Survive the Night	Sergeant	Television film
1993	Shameful Secrets	Counselor #1	Television film
1993	Secret Service	Indigo	Episode: "Gentlemen Prefer Bonds/The IDs of March"
1993	Hollywood Babylon	Actress	Episode: "Belushi/Leigh"
1995	Sailor Moon	Lori (voice)	Episode: "An Animated Mess"
1995	Women of the House	Woman	Episode: "Bad Girl"
1995	Deadly Whispers	Susan Banks	Television film
1996	Due South	Miss Sheldrake - States Attorney	Episode: "Red, White or Blue"
1996	Gone in the Night	Mary Ann Brown	
1997	Balls Up	Tracy	Television film
1997–2002	Lexx	Giggerota	6 episodes
1998	Sealed with a Kiss	Jasmine	Television film
1998	Pacific Blue	Gretchen Marx	Episode: "Thrill Week"
1998	First Wave	Sarah Washburne	Episode: "Elixer"
1999	Killer Deal	Lisabeth Parker	Television film
1999	Highlander: The Raven	Crysta	2 episodes
1999	The New Addams Family	Ma McAddams	Episode: "Addams Family Feud"
2000	Earth: Final Conflict	Shelley George	Episode: "Interview"
2000	Best Actress	Fatima	Television film
2000	Queen of Swords	Actress (voice)	2 episodes
2001	Relic Hunter	Jacqueline Reed	Episode: "The Reel Thing"
2001	RoboCop: Prime Directives	Sandra Smyles	2 episodes
2002	All Around the Town	Carla Hawkins aka Opal	Television film
2002	Tracker	Abby Swenson	Episode: "The Miracle"
2002	Wildfire 7	Jo Jo	Television film
2003	Adventure Inc	Dr. Leah Kelly	Episode: "Plague Ship of Val Verde"
2003	A Wrinkle in Time	Aunt Beast	Television film
2003	Starhunter	Father Abode	Episode: "Bio Crime"
2003	Lightning: Bolts of Destruction	Gail	Television film
2004	Strange Days at Blake Holsey High	Coach Carson	Episode: "Equation"
2004	Mutant X	Dr. Robinson	Episode: "In Between"
2004	The Murdoch Mysteries	Olive Foy	Episode: "Except the Dying"
2004	Puppets Who Kill	Trans-Lady	Episode: Sugar
2004–2006	The Collector	Jeri Slate	24 episodes
2005	Lies and Deception	Charlotte Porter	Television film
2005	Young Blades	Clementine, Duchess de Bobigny	Episode: "Four Musketeers and a Baby"
2005	The Dead Zone	Callie Fallon	Episode: "Heroes & Demons"
2005	Swarmed	Ellie Martin	Television film
2006	The Wives He Forgot	Gwen	Television film
2006	Murder in My House	Claire	Television film
2006	The Jane Show	Marian	Episode: "Ode to Marian"
2006	Hank William's First Nation	Amanda Jenkins	2 episodes
2007	Blood Ties	Felicia	Episode: "Wild Blood"
2007	Abducted: Fugitive for Love	Stephanie Baker	Television film
2008	A Teacher's Crime	Anne Libby	Television film
2010	When Love Is Not Enough: The Lois Wilson Story	Dora	Television film
2010	Second Chances	Detective Sinclair	Television film
2010-2011	The Resolve	Megan Frost	3 episodes
2011	The Ron James Show	Janet	Episode: "Math Problem"
2012	The Listener	Dr. Lori Marette	Episode: "Lockdown"
2012, 2016	Murdoch Mysteries	Amelia Haversham	2 episodes
2015-2016	Suspense	Marizta Draculea / Cha Cha Sinclair	2 episodes
2016	Lego Star Wars: The Resistance Rises	Captain Phasma (voice)	2 episodes
2016	Bizaardvark	Russian soap opera actress (voice)	Episode: "Unboxing"
2016	The Thundermans	Security systems / evil computer (voice)	2 episodes
2017	My Roommate’s an Escort	Ginger	Episode: "Boss Lady"
2019	Star Wars Resistance	Captain Phasma (voice)	Episode: "Into the Unknown"
2020	Elinor Wonders Why	Farmer Bear (voice)	
2021	Blood and Water	Eleanor Eaton	Episode: "Ghosts"
2021	Adventures in Odyssey	Beatrice (voice)	Episode: "If I Never Told You"
2022-2023	Daniel Spellbound	Nurenya (voice)	
2022	Big Blue	Stingray Queen Trudie (voice)	

=== Video games ===
Year	Title	Role	Notes
2004	World of Warcraft	Additional voices	
2011	The Elder Scrolls V: Skyrim	Adisla, Brelas, additional voices	
2012	Guild Wars 2	Additional voices	
2014	Defense Grid 2	Cai	
2014	The Elder Scrolls Online	Additional voices	
2014	Murdered: Soul Suspect	Cassandra Foster	
2014	Wasteland 2	Ashley Brygo	
2015	Fallout 4	Alana Secord, Allie Filmore	
2015	Star Wars: Uprising	Captain Tystel, additional voices	
2015	Skyforge	Herida	
2016	Eternal	Eilyn, Queen of the Wilds	
2018	Starlink: Battle for Atlas	Additional voices	
2020	Wasteland 3	Major Vera Presad	
2020	Guardian Tales	Destroyer Pymon	
2020	Legends of Runeterra	Xolaani	
2021	Astria Ascending	Alasia	
2021	Disgaea 6: Defiance of Destiny	Principal Majolene	
2022	Relayer	Relayer	
2022	Legends of Runeterra	Xolaani	
2023	Reverse: 1999	Animus	
2024	Dragon Age: The Veilguard	Evka	
2024	Star Wars Outlaws	Additional voices	
2025	Avowed	Additional voices	

=== Other ===
Year	Title	Role	Notes
2015	Disneyland Forever	Narrator	Nighttime Spectacular show in Disneyland
2017	Disney Illuminations!	Narrator	Nighttime Spectacular show in Disneyland Paris
