= Mr. Write =

- Directed by: Charlie Loventhal
- Screenplay by: Howard J. Morris
- Based on: Mr. Write by Howard J. Morris
- Produced by: Joan Fishman; Rick Herrington
- Starring: Paul Reiser
- Cinematography: Elliot Davis
- Edited by: Eric L. Beason
- Music by: Miles Roston
- Production company: Presto Productions
- Distributed by: Shapiro-Glickenhaus Entertainment
- Release date: May 6, 1994
- Running time: 89 minutes
- Country: United States
- Language: English

Mr. Write is a 1994 American comedy-drama film directed by Charlie Loventhal and starring Paul Reiser. It is based on Howard J. Morris's play of the same name.

== Cast ==
- Paul Reiser as Charlie Fischer
- Jessica Tuck as Nicole Barnes
- Doug Davidson as Roger
- Jane Leeves as Wylie
- Calvert DeForest as Mr. Rhett
- Gigi Rice as Shelly
- Eddie Barth as Dad
- Wendie Jo Sperber as Roz
- Darryl M. Bell as Lawrence
- Thomas F. Wilson as Billy
- Martin Mull as Dan Barnes
- Shannon Sturges as Rachel
