= Signy Coleman =

American actress

- Born: July 4, 1960 (age 66); Ross, California, U.S.
- Other name: Signey Coleman
- Occupation: Actress
- Years active: 1984–2012
- Spouses: Vincent Irizarry (m. 1989; div. 1992) Thomas Nolan (m. 1999; div. 2004)
- Children: 2

Signy Coleman (born July 4, 1960), sometimes credited as Signey Coleman, is an American former actress. She is known mainly for work in television, with a recurring role on The Young and the Restless.

== Background ==
Coleman was born in Ross, California, on July 4, 1960. She grew up in Bolinas, California, and attended Tamalpais High School in Mill Valley. She has three siblings.

== Career ==
Coleman was a contract regular on soap opera The Young and the Restless as the blind heroine Hope Adams (1993–97, 2000, 2002, 2008, 2010, 2012). Her character died of cancer in February 2008, but appeared in visions thereafter. She also starred on Guiding Light as Annie Dutton (1998–99, 2003).

Coleman's prime time roles include appearances on Law & Order: Criminal Intent, Law & Order: Special Victims Unit, Human Target, The Steven Banks Show, Jake and the Fatman, Silk Stalkings, Doors, Necronomicon, Dark Justice, The Flash and The X-Files. She has appeared in such films as Relentless III, Indecent Proposal, and 20 Dates.

She also appeared in two music videos with Huey Lewis and the News: "I Want a New Drug" and "Heart and Soul". She appeared in an episode of Charles in Charge as model Rebecca Stansbury.

In 2012, Coleman joined the cast of River Ridge in the role of Sharon Reeves; she also served as executive producer on the series.

== Family ==
Coleman was married for three years to actor Vincent Irizarry (married 1989; divorced 1992), by whom she has a daughter. She also has a daughter by her second husband, Thomas Nolan (married 1999; divorced 2004).

== Roles ==
=== Television ===
- Knight Rider (1985) Burial Ground, Barbara
- Matlock: Stockbroker Taylor Sinclair (1990)
- Law & Order: Criminal Intent: Joyce Wizneski (2006)
- The Division: Alicia Ray (2004)
- Law & Order: Special Victims Unit: Kim Hoffman (2003)
- Players: Mrs. Parker (1998)
- Chicago Hope: Dr. Susan Skinner (1998)
- Mike Hammer, Private Eye: Lucinda Kasher (1998)
- Guiding Light: Annie Dutton (1998–1999, 2003)
- The X-Files: Susanne Modeski (1997, 1999)
- Diagnosis: Murder: Julia Brush (1997)
- The Young and the Restless: Hope Adams (1993–1997, 2000–2002, 2008, 2010, 2012)
- Human Target: Libby Page (1992)
- Santa Barbara: Celeste DiNapoli (1988–1989)
- River Ridge: Sharon Reeves (2012)
- Viper: Sylvia Ehrengraff in the episode Thief of Hearts (1994)
- The Flash: Stasia Masters in the episode 19-Done with Mirrors (1991)
- Silk Stalkings: Astrid Sinclair in the episode Crime of Love (1993)
