= Lego Star Wars: The Resistance Rises =

Lego Star Wars computer animated series

- Genre: Star Wars; Animation; Action/comedy; Shorts
- Starring: Lex Lang; Anthony Daniels; Matthew Wood; Ellen Dubin; Trevor Devall; Grey Griffin; Billy Dee Williams; Arif S. Kinchen
- Country of origin: United States
- Original language: English
- No. of episodes: 5

Production
- Production companies: Lucasfilm; Lego; M2Film

Original release
- Network: Disney XD
- Release: February 15 – May 4, 2016

Lego Star Wars: The Resistance Rises is a five-episode Lego Star Wars short form computer-animated series that debuted on Disney XD on February 15, 2016. A comedic prequel to the 2015 film Star Wars: The Force Awakens, it focuses on the exploits of Star Wars characters from that film, as well as legacy characters.

== Episodes ==
| No. | Title | Original release date | Length |
|---|---|---|---|
| 1 | "Poe to the Rescue" | February 15, 2016 | 6:47 |
After retrieving a marooned C-3PO, Poe Dameron and BB-8 take him to help rescue a captive Admiral Ackbar from Captain Phasma and Kylo Ren.
| 2 | "The Trouble with Rathtars" | April 13, 2016 | 3:39 |
While trying to manage the rathtars running loose on their ship, Han Solo and Chewbacca find themselves in the path of a First Order TIE fighter.
| 3 | "Hunting for Han" | April 20, 2016 | 4:41 |
At Maz Kanata'a castle, various shady characters are hunting the elusive Han Solo. Special Guest Star: Lando Calrissian.
| 4 | "Rey Strikes Back" | April 27, 2016 | 4:41 |
Unkar Plutt sends his men to steal Rey's tank speeder.
| 5 | "Attack of the Conscience" | May 4, 2016 | 4:41 |
After Captain Phasma puts him on active duty, Stormtrooper FN-2187 starts to doubt the motives of the First Order.

== Cast ==
- Dee Bradley Baker as Unkar Plutt
- Anthony Daniels as C-3PO
- Trevor Devall as Admiral Ackbar
- Ellen Dubin as Captain Phasma
- Grey Griffin as Maz Kanata
- Arif S. Kinchen as Finn
- Lex Lang as Poe Dameron
- Helen Sadler as Rey
- James Arnold Taylor as Bala-Tik
- Billy Dee Williams as Lando Calrissian
- Matthew Wood as Kylo Ren
