= Bransfield =

Bransfield is a surname. Notable people with the surname include:

- Edward Bransfield (c. 1785–1852), Irish sailor and naval officer
- Kitty Bransfield (1875–1947), American baseball player
- Marjorie Bransfield, American actress
- Michael J. Bransfield (1943–2026), American Catholic clergyman

Places

- Bransfield Island, Joinville Island group
- Bransfield Basin, Antarctica
