= Abraxas, Guardian of the Universe =

- Film poster
- Directed by: Damian Lee
- Screenplay by: Damian Lee
- Produced by: Damian Lee; David Mitchell
- Starring: Jesse Ventura; Sven-Ole Thorsen; Marjorie Bransfield; Jerry Levitan; Francis Mitchell
- Cinematography: Curtis Petersen
- Edited by: Reid Dennison
- Music by: Carlos Lopes
- Production company: Rose & Ruby Productions
- Distributed by: Cineplex Odeon
- Release date: 1 March 1991 (Toronto)
- Running time: 87 minutes
- Countries: Canada; United States
- Language: English
- Budget: CAD$3.2 million

Abraxas, Guardian of the Universe is a 1991 science fiction film written and directed by Damian Lee, starring Jesse Ventura, Sven-Ole Thorsen and Marjorie Bransfield. Ventura plays an extraterrestrial cop seeking to protect a child prodigy from his father, a fellow alien who has virginally conceived him with a human woman to solve the advanced equation that will grant him absolute powers. Jim Belushi has a cameo in the film, reprising his role from The Principal (1987).

== Plot ==
Abraxas and Secundus are Finders, intergalactic police officers from the planet Sargacia. Their race is physically similar to humans but with an extended lifespan; Abraxas has been a Finder for almost 10,000 years. Each Finder is equipped with an Answer Box, which serves as a communicator and scanner. It can also detect any object from a distance based on the object's vibration. When testing for the Anti-Life Equation, the subject being scanned will disintegrate if they do not contain the equation.

Secundus wants to access a negative universe which he believes will give him omnipotent powers and make him immortal. To do this, he needs the solution to the Anti-Life Equation. He travels to Earth and impregnates the first human female he finds, Sonia Murray, simply by holding his hand over her belly. The resulting baby will be the Culmator, a dangerously powerful prodigy able to solve the equation. Only a few minutes later, Sonia gives birth to a boy and names him Tommy. Meanwhile, Abraxas corners Secundus so other Finders can lock onto their location and transport Secundus to the prison planet Tyrannus 7. Abraxas is ordered to kill Sonia before she can give birth, but cannot bring himself to do it, leaving her with Tommy. Sonia's parents kick her out of their house, more concerned with the fact that she does not know who the baby's father is than the fact that the baby was conceived and born on the same day.

Five years later, Tommy does not speak but does have strange abilities; when he is picked on at school, he makes the bully wet his pants. The school principal calls Sonia in about the incident, but she refuses to admit that Tommy has problems. Secundus escapes from Tyrannus 7 and teleports to Earth. The Finders send Abraxas right after Secundus with the same technology, but their transport paths cross and their weapons are destroyed. Abraxas chases Secundus, but loses him; Secundus uses the fuse box at an automotive shop to recharge his Answer Box. When the owner confronts him, he uses his Answer Box to test the shop-owner with the Anti-Life Equation. The test causes the owner to explode. Secundus goes on a rampage, stealing cars, killing innocent people and causing chaos. He continues to scan people, looking for the chosen one who knows the Anti-Life Equation.

Secundus escapes and finds Sonia's residence. While Sonia and Tommy are out at a movie, Secundus tries to test the equation on the boy. Abraxas arrives before any harm can be done and they fight once more. Abraxas is stabbed in the stomach and Secundus leaves after telling Abraxas he will live to see everything destroyed. Sonia returns home with Tommy and finds Abraxas in the living room. She expresses her anger about being impregnated by Secundus to him, but is convinced by Abraxas to drive somewhere safe with him and Tommy. While en route to meet Maxie, a friend of Sonia's, Abraxas disables his Answer Box in disgust when the Finders order him to kill Tommy. At Maxie's, Abraxas and Sonia grow closer due to their shared goal of protecting Tommy, developing romantic feelings for each other.

Meanwhile, Secundus enters the local school and threatens to kill the children one at a time unless someone brings him the Culmator. Abraxas, Sonia, and Tommy meet up with the police and find Secundus at the school, where he repeats his ultimatum. Abraxas fights Secundus while Tommy flees, but Secundus overpowers Abraxas and chases Tommy in a stolen car, cornering him in a garage. Pushed to breaking point, Tommy's latent pyrokinetic powers activate, causing much of the garage to catch fire. Abraxas catches up to Secundus and fights him. Secundus warns Abraxas that he cannot kill him because it is against Sargacian law for a Finder to kill another Finder. Abraxas ignores him and uses his Answer Box to scan Secundus for the Anti-Life Equation, disintegrating him and putting an end to his rampage. Although Finder Command are willing for Abraxas to return to Sargacia for his next assignment, he decides to stay behind on Earth with Sonia and Tommy in case anyone attempts to exploit the Culmator again.

== Cast ==
- Jesse Ventura as Abraxas
- Sven-Ole Thorsen as Secundus
- Marjorie Bransfield as Sonia Murray
- Damian Lee as Dar
- Jerry Levitan as Hite
- Ken Quinn as Carl
- Marilyn Lightstone as Abraxas' Answer Box (voice)
- Moses Znaimer as Secundus' Answer Box (voice)
- Robert Nasmith as Sonia's Father
- Kris Michaels as Sonia's Mother
- Layne Coleman as Registry Clerk
- Francis Mitchell as Tommy Murray
- Sonja Belliveau as Doctor Scundundas
- Jim Belushi as Principal Latimer
- Erica Heenan as School Secretary
- Albert Timmer II as Maxie
- Michael Copeman as Sheriff Sharp
- Alexander Ruge as Secundus' Victim

== Production ==
=== Development ===
Zimbabwe was considered as the filming location, before the producers returned to their home province of Ontario, Canada. The film's budget was projected at CAD$2.5 million at the start of production, but was said to have grown to CAD$3.2 million by the time of release. It was financed by a loan secured from a Dutch bank on the strength of international distribution commitments, and local money coming from businessman Alexander Ruge, who owned Cambridge-based Ruge Manufacturing.

=== Casting ===
Pro wrestler Jesse "The Body" Ventura commanded a salary equivalent to US$250,000, which was then considered a hefty fee for an independent film. He already had a working relationship with Lee from their previous film Thunderground. Ventura took a leave of absence from his announcing job with the Tampa Bay Buccaneers to appear in the film. He also got his young son Tyrel hired to play one of Tommy's bullies, which he described as a perk of working on an independent production. Jerry Levitan, a lawyer who was trying to break into the film industry, was cast on short notice in Los Angeles, where he was visiting companies to pitch a legal comedy he had written as a vehicle for himself.

Until the early stages of filming, Grace Jones and Mr. T were hoped to appear as inhabitants of planet Sargacia. Jones was supposed to film her short role in Toronto, while T was still in talks to travel to the main location of Thornbury for a cameo. Neither were present in the finished product. Jim Belushi did have a cameo in the film, in a role reminiscent of the one he had recently played in The Principal. He participated as a courtesy to the film's co-star Marjorie Bransfield, with whom he was then in a relationship. The voice of Secundus' computer is performed by Moses Znaimer, a Toronto TV owner who helped finance Rose & Ruby's move into feature films a few years prior.

=== Filming ===
Principal photography started on November 13, 1989, and was scheduled to last five weeks. The cast and crew comprised around 90 people. The town of Thornbury and its surroundings, where both Lee and Mitchell had homes, provided the main locations, as its scenic views came at a much lower price tag than Toronto. Tommy's school was the local Beaver Valley Community School. The Georgian Peaks Ski Club served as production headquarters, as Lee and Mitchell were members of the club. Additional scenes were shot two hours away in the Kitchener-Waterloo area, at places such a bar called The Network and a former factory on Victoria Street.

Due to the filming dates, much of the shoot took place in strong winds, with temperatures dipping as low as minus 30 and nights lasting about 14 hours, requiring holes to be cut into solid ice to stage some sequences. Ventura was hesitant to perform scenes where his character walks into the cold water, but he ultimately did. He was nonetheless cautious enough to demand dry socks for every new take, which co-star Sven-Ole Thorsen found futile. The leading actors were lodged in upscale apartments surrounding the picturesque Georgian Bay, which went a long way towards compensating for the harsh climate. Despite Thornbury being a conservative Presbyterian town that did not much care for the agitation brought by a film crew, wrestling's large popularity in Canada guaranteed Ventura a warm welcome.

== Release ==
=== Theatrical ===
Abraxas, Guardian of the Universe was released theatrically in Toronto on March 1, 1991, by Cineplex Odeon. The film also received a series of charity screenings in the Kitchener-Waterloo agglomeration, where part of it was shot, to benefit the local Rotary Club. David and Francis Mitchell were in attendance.

=== Home video ===
The film arrived on Canadian VHS through Cineplex Odeon on March 28, 1991. It made its belated U.S. debut via Prism Entertainment on April 21, 1993. The boxcover title was just Abraxas.

=== 1998 revival ===
Abraxas received a modicum of interest upon Ventura's election as governor of Minnesota. Paired with Predator, it was part of, and gave its name to, Jesse Fest: Governor of Minnesota/Guardian of the Universe, a double bill hosted by the University of Minnesota Film Society at the Bell Auditorium in Minneapolis from December 16 to December 20, 1998.

=== RiffTrax ===
On August 11, 2011, the comedy team from Mystery Science Theater 3000, RiffTrax, released a version of Abraxas with an overlaid track of jokes making fun of the movie.

== Reception ==
Abraxas, Guardian of the Universe has enjoyed a lackluster reception. Rob Salem of The Toronto Star said that "it is [a bad film]. But it isn't terrible. In fact, it's occasionally kind of fun." He found that it "remains a cut above most of the sci-fi/action dreck you'll soon find it surrounded by on video-store shelves". The BBC's RadioTimes Guide to Science-Fiction decreed that "[a]side from a lot of grunting, fighting and laser-gun shoot-outs in snowy landscapes, there's little on offer to either engage or entertain in this Canadian-made time-waster". VideoHound's Sci-Fi Experience assessed that although "a few camp touches (like James Belushi's cameo) indicate nobody should take it too seriously", the film is "mainly two burly, gravel-voiced bruisers pummeling each other."

TV Guide thought that the film's modest scope belied its grandiose title, and that "[a] more accurate title would be Abraxas, Guardian of Thornbury, Ontario, because the intergalactic mayhem seldom oversteps the border of that one snowy town". It further complained that its relatively comfortable budget did not show on screen, arguing that "[s]o much money could only be explained if over half of it went to Jim Belushi for his funny cameo". James O'Neill, author of the book Sci-Fi on Tape, dismissed the film as a "[p]itiful, would-be actioner Ventura desperately tries to save".

== Soundtrack ==
The film has earned notice for its saxophone-heavy smooth jazz score by Carlo Lopes, which has been deemed highly inappropriate for a work falling into the action genre. It also features several songs, such as "Strong as I Am" by The Prime Movers. That band was unaware of its inclusion and contacted the filmmakers with assistance from performance rights company BMI to sort out the legal details behind it.
