= The Principal =

1987 film directed by Christopher Cain

- Theatrical release poster
- Directed by: Christopher Cain
- Written by: Frank Deese
- Produced by: Thomas H. Brodek
- Starring: James Belushi; Louis Gossett Jr.; Rae Dawn Chong; Kelly Minter
- Cinematography: Arthur Albert
- Edited by: Jack Hofstra
- Music by: Jay Gruska
- Production company: ML Delphi Premier Productions
- Distributed by: Tri-Star Pictures
- Release date: September 15, 1987
- Running time: 109 minutes
- Country: United States
- Language: English
- Budget: $11 million
- Box office: $19.7 million (USA)

The Principal is a 1987 American action comedy film starring Jim Belushi, Louis Gossett Jr. and Rae Dawn Chong. Written by Frank Deese and directed by Christopher Cain, it was filmed in Oakland, California, and at Northgate High School in nearby Walnut Creek and distributed by Tri-Star Pictures on Panavision. Belushi reprised his role as Rick Latimer in the 1991 film Abraxas, Guardian of the Universe.

== Plot ==
One night, after spotting his ex-wife Kimberly in a bar with her divorce attorney, alcoholic high-school teacher Rick Latimer fights with him, culminating in Rick bashing the hapless man's car with a baseball bat. Rick is arrested for the incident.

Finding that Rick's behavior tarnishes the school district's image, the board of education decides to transfer him to Brandel High. In this crime-ridden and gang-dominated institution, unruly kids are sent after being expelled from other schools. Initially, Rick is just as lost, incorrigible, & hopeless as the students of "Brand X" (the nickname everyone derisively calls the school).

Believing he can repair his image by cleaning up the school, Rick holds an assembly and declares his intentions: "No more." No more drugs, no more running in the hallways, and no more being late to class. During his speech, Victor Duncan, the leader of the school's dominant gang, derides Rick in front of everyone, then walks out. This sparks a small riot, which earns Rick the enmity of the teachers and Jake, the school head of security and a graduate of Brandel.

Eventually, Rick manages to enforce his policies, getting rid of the drugs being dealt in the bathrooms, and clearing out the hallways — but not always successfully. As the students are now forced to go to class, some of the more unruly ones become increasingly disruptive, including troublemaker White Zac, who eventually attempts to rape one of the teachers, Ms. Orozco. She throws a chair through one of her classroom windows, alerting Rick to her distress. He then rides his motorcycle into the school and chases down White Zac, beating him unconscious and stuffing him into a trash can.

Victor, meanwhile, continues to assert his influence on the school, going so far as to brutally beat Emile, a former member of his gang who warms to Rick's teaching style and starts learning. Rick later finds him hanging by his ankles after being thrown through a skylight in the school. Rick himself is also ambushed and beaten while Victor's gang defaces his motorcycle. Arturo and his friends in shop class repair the motorcycle and paint "El Principal" on the gas tank and Rick's helmet. After a confrontation in the lunch room, Victor threatens Rick, warning him that if he shows up the next day, he is going to die. Rick scoffs and walks away as Victor continues to threaten him.

The next day, after classes have been dismissed, Victor and his crew sneak into the school. While Jake goes to chain the doors, Rick attempts to call 911 but discovers that Victor's crew has cut the phone lines. A game of cat and mouse ensues. Jake gets locked in a storage closet by one of Victor's crew, while Rick hides in the girls' shower room with a baseball bat, waiting for Victor. After a brief chase, Victor and Jojo corner him. While holding Rick at gunpoint, Victor orders Jojo to cut him.

Jojo refuses to kill Rick, telling Victor that killing him would bring the police down on the crew and that they all would be convicted of first degree murder and sent to prison for life. Victor shoots and kills Jojo, but before he can shoot Rick, Arturo intervenes and strikes Victor with Rick's baseball bat. The distraction leads to a showdown in the school halls between Victor and Rick. Initially, Victor seems to have the upper hand, but Rick overpowers him and beats Victor senseless, throwing him through the schoolhouse doors.

Victor's defeat greatly shocks the rest of the school, who witness the fight. Several students cheer Rick on, much to the chagrin of Victor's gang members. After a small fight breaks out, Rick again declares, "No more!", which stops the fight quickly. The police finally arrive, and Victor is arrested and taken away. A student derisively asks Rick, "Hey man, who the hell do you think you are?!" Rick responds, "I'm the principal, man!" and rides away on his motorcycle.

== Cast ==
- Jim Belushi as Principal Rick Latimer
- Louis Gossett Jr. as Jake Phillips, Head Guard
- Rae Dawn Chong as Hilary Orozco, History Teacher
- Michael Wright as Victor Duncan, Gang Leader and Drug Dealer
- Reggie Johnson as Joe "Jo-Jo"
- Jeffrey Jay Cohen as Zac "White Zac" Mawby
- Kelly Minter as Treena Lester
- Esai Morales as Raymundo "Raymi" Rojas
- Troy Winbush as Emile "Baby Emile"
- Jacob Vargas as Arturo Diego

== Box office ==
The Principal was moderately successful commercially, grossing a total of $19,734,940 domestically.

== Reception ==
On Rotten Tomatoes the film has an approval rating of 50% based on reviews from 10 critics. On Metacritic the film has a score of 37% based on reviews from 8 critics. Audiences surveyed by CinemaScore gave the film a grade B on scale of A to F.

In the Los Angeles Times, Michael Wilmington wrote that the film "degenerates into one more cliche-ridden revenge movie. At the end, when Jim Belushi’s character, Principal Rick Latimer, is stalked through his deserted high school by knife-wielding gang members--he might as well be Conan battling the barbarians."

In 2014, the movie was one of several discussed by Keli Goff in The Daily Beast in an article concerning white savior narratives in film.

== See also ==
- List of hood films
