= Royce (film) =

- Genre: Action; Comedy; Thriller
- Written by: Paul Bernbaum
- Directed by: Rod Holcomb
- Starring: Jim Belushi; Miguel Ferrer
- Music by: Stanley Clarke
- Country of origin: United States
- Original language: English

Production
- Executive producers: Paul Bernbaum; David Gerber
- Producer: J. Boyce Harman Jr.
- Production locations: Toronto; Budapest
- Cinematography: Thomas Del Ruth
- Editor: Christopher Nelson
- Running time: 1h 38min
- Production companies: Gerber Company; Incorporated Television Company; Showtime Networks

Original release
- Network: Showtime
- Release: April 3, 1994

Royce is a 1994 American television film directed by Rod Holcomb. The film premiered on Showtime on April 3, 1994.

== Premise ==
Cutbacks force the closure of a secret government department, so several agents try to reverse the decision by kidnapping a senator's son.

== Cast ==
- Jim Belushi – Shane Royce
- Miguel Ferrer – Gribbon
- Peter Boyle – Huggins
- Chelsea Field – Marnie Paymer
- Anthony Head – Pitlock
- Marie-Françoise Theodore – Jerri Sloan
- Paris Jefferson – Brenda
- Jimmy McKenna – Danny Scanlon
- Michael J. Shannon – Senator Scanlon
- Susan Denaker – Dee Scanlon
- Christopher Fairbank – Kupchak
- William Marsh – Rafkin
- Ralph Ineson – Newfold
- Daniel Kash – Tommy McFain

== Production ==
The movie was shot in Los Angeles, Budapest (Hungary) and Toronto (Canada).
