= Jim Belushi =

American actor and comedian (born 1954)

Jim Belushi NK
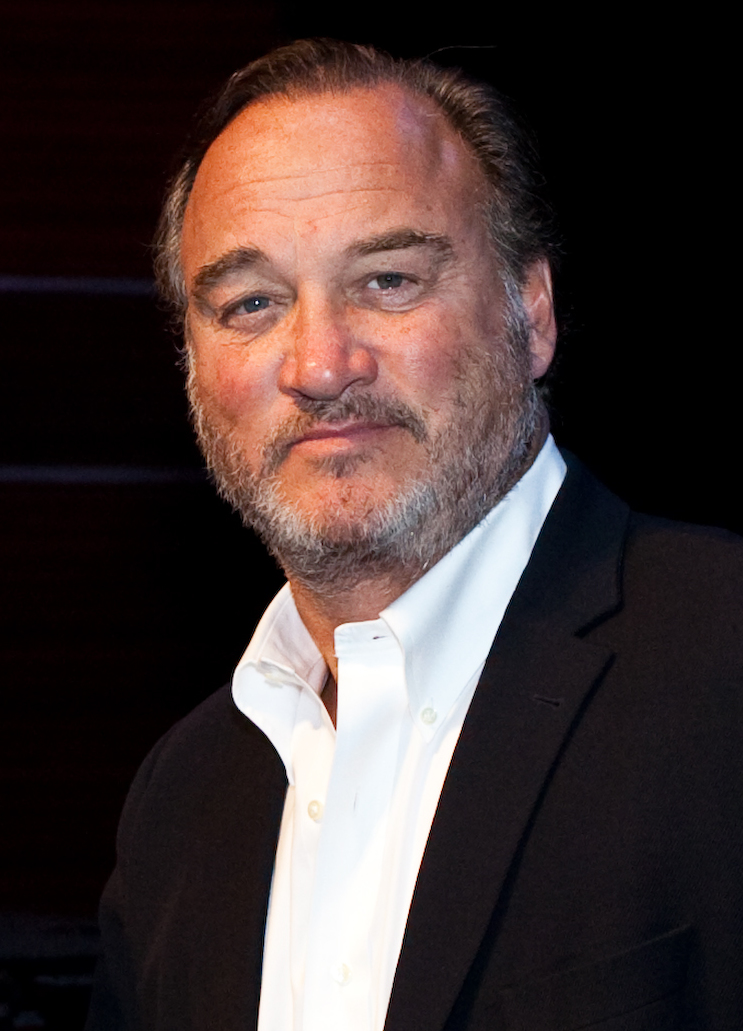
- Belushi in 2015
- Born: James Adam Belushi; June 15, 1954 (age 72); Chicago, Illinois, U.S.
- Other names: James Belushi "The Belush"; Zee Blues
- Citizenship: United States; Albania
- Education: Southern Illinois University, Carbondale (BA)
- Occupations: Actor; comedian; musician
- Years active: 1977–present
- Spouses: Sandra Davenport (m. 1980; div. 1988) Marjorie Bransfield (m. 1990; div. 1992) Jennifer Sloan (m. 1998; div. 2021)
- Children: 3, including Robert
- Relatives: John Belushi (brother); Judith Belushi-Pisano (sister-in-law)
- Awards: Honor of the Nation
- Website: belushisfarm.com

James Adam Belushi (/bəˈluːʃi/ bə-LOO-shee; born June 15, 1954) is an American actor and comedian. His television roles include Saturday Night Live (1983–1985), According to Jim (2001–2009), and Good Girls Revolt (2015–2016).

Belushi appeared in films such as Thief (1981), Trading Places (1983), The Man with One Red Shoe (1985), Salvador (1986), Red Heat (1988), K-9 (1989), Taking Care of Business (1990), Destiny Turns on the Radio (1995), Angel's Dance (1999), Joe Somebody (2001), Underdog (2007), The Ghost Writer (2010), The Secret Lives of Dorks (2013), Wonder Wheel (2017), and Song Sung Blue (2025).

He is the younger brother of late comedy actor John Belushi and the father of actor Robert Belushi.

== Early life and education ==
James Adam Belushi was born June 15, 1954, in Wheaton, Illinois, to Adam Anastos Belushi, an Albanian from Qytezë, Korçë, and Agnes Demetri Samaras, who was born in Ohio to ethnic Albanian immigrants from Korçë, south Albania. He was raised in Wheaton, a Chicago suburb, along with his three siblings: older brother John, older sister Marian, and younger brother Billy.

After graduating from Wheaton Central High School in 1972, Jim Belushi attended the College of DuPage, and graduated from Southern Illinois University Carbondale with a bachelor's degree in Speech and Theater Arts in 1978.

== Career ==
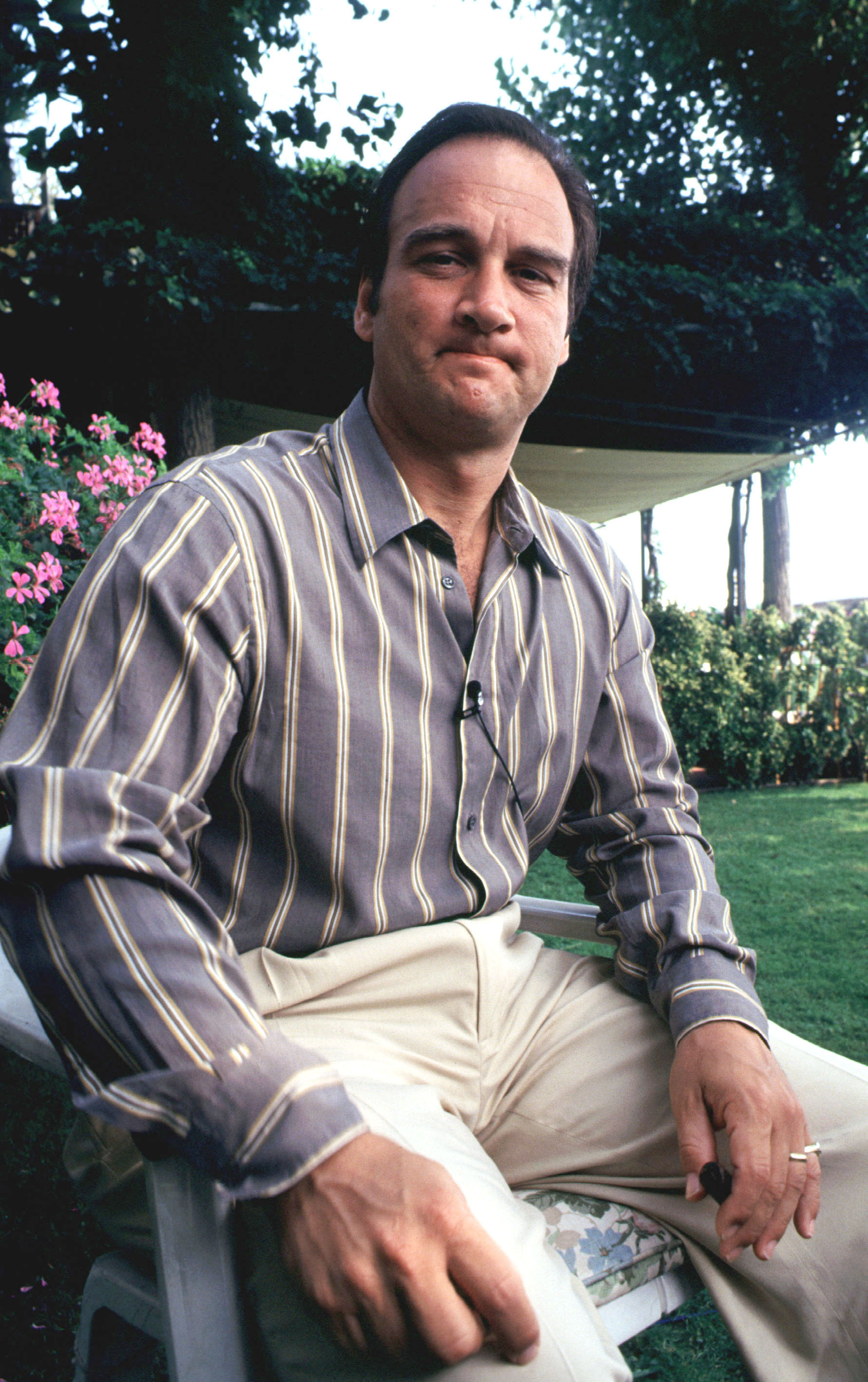
Belushi at the 39th Venice International Film Festival in 1982

From 1977 to 1980, Belushi, like his older brother John, worked with the Chicago theater group The Second City. In 1978, he made his television debut in Who's Watching the Kids, as well as a small part in Brian De Palma's The Fury. His first significant role was in Michael Mann's Thief (1981). After John's death, from 1983 to 1985, he appeared on Saturday Night Live. Jim portrayed characters such as Hank Rippy from "Hello, Trudy!", Man on the Street Jesse Donnelly, and "That White Guy". He also appeared in the film Trading Places as a drunk man in a gorilla suit during a New Year's Eve party. He made a guest appearance in Faerie Tale Theatre's third-season episode "Pinocchio", starring Paul Reubens, as the titular puppet.

Belushi rose to greater prominence with his supporting roles in The Man with One Red Shoe (1985), About Last Night..., Salvador and Little Shop of Horrors (as Patrick Martin), all in 1986. These appearances opened up opportunities for lead roles. Additional movies he starred in are: Real Men, The Principal, Red Heat, Homer and Eddie, K-9, Abraxas, Guardian of the Universe, The Palermo Connection, Taking Care of Business, Mr. Destiny, Only the Lonely, Curly Sue, Once upon a Crime..., Wild Palms, Race the Sun, Separate Lives, Retroactive, Gang Related and Angel's Dance.

In 1991, Belushi appeared during MC Hammer's music video "2 Legit 2 Quit" (in the extended full-length version), as a newscaster.

His voice acting includes: The Mighty Ducks, The Pebble and the Penguin, Babes in Toyland, Gargoyles, Hey Arnold!, Hoodwinked!, Scooby-Doo! and the Goblin King, and The Wild. He also lent his vocal talents for 9: The Last Resort (a PC game released in 1995), in which he portrayed "Salty", a coarse yet helpful character. In 1997, he portrayed the "Masked Mutant" in the Goosebumps PC video game, alongside Adam West as "The Galloping Gazelle".

On January 4, 2001, Belushi appeared on the ER episode "Piece of Mind". The episode focused both on Dr. Mark Greene's life-or-death brain surgery in New York and on Belushi's character, who had been in a car accident with his son in Chicago. Belushi's performance contributed to his re-emergence in the public eye, and the following year he was cast as the title role in ABC's According to Jim.

His first animation voice-over was as a pimple on Krumm's head in Aaahh!!! Real Monsters on Nickelodeon. That performance led him to be cast in the recurring role as Simon the Monster Hunter in that series, where he ad-libbed much of his dialogue.

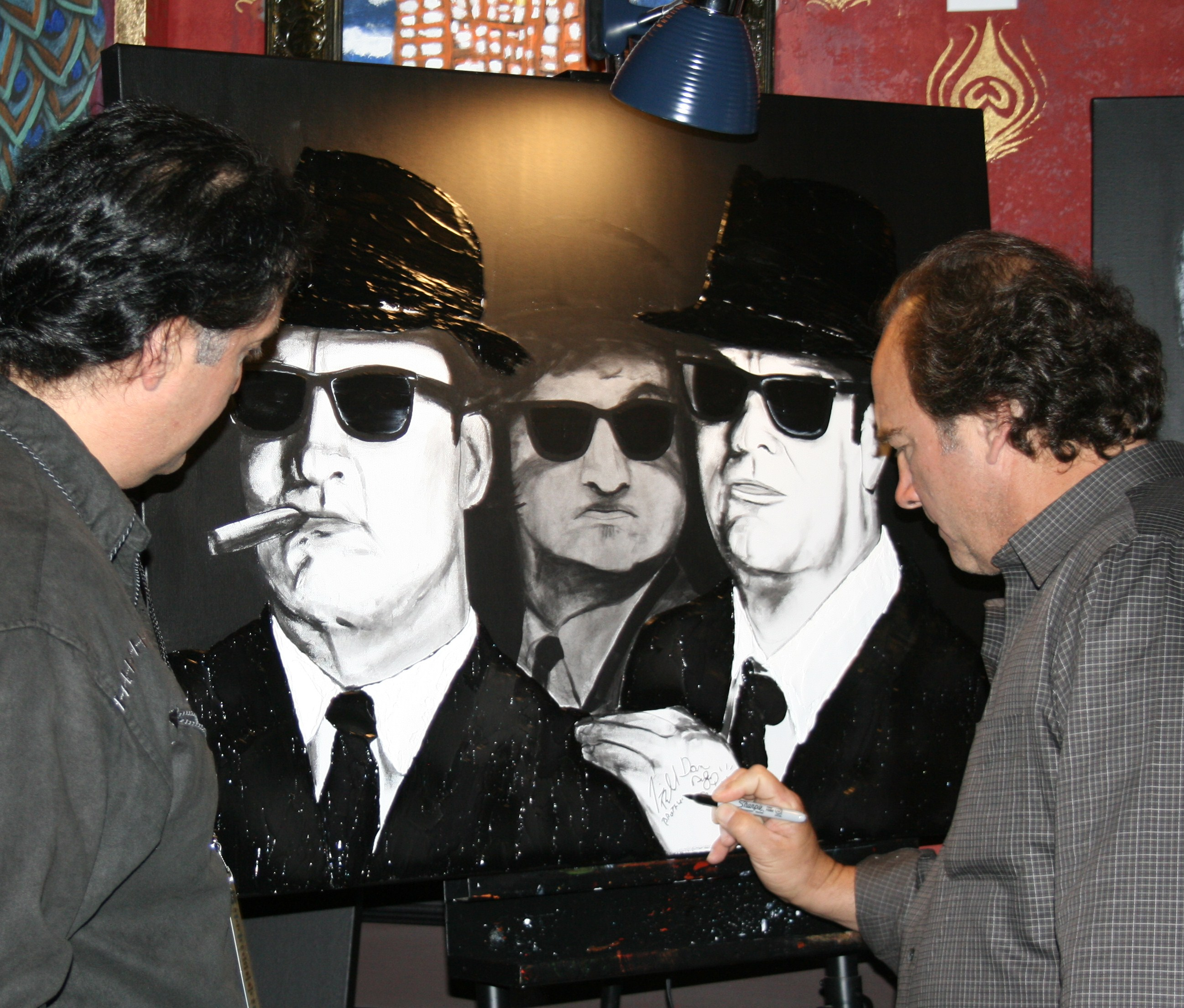
Belushi in House of Blues in Houston, 2008

In 2003, Belushi and Dan Aykroyd released the album Have Love, Will Travel, and participated in an accompanying tour. The concert was made available on video on demand by Bob Gold & Associates.

Belushi also performed at various venues nationwide as Zee Blues in an updated version of The Blues Brothers. He released his first book, Real Men Don't Apologize, in May 2006.

Belushi was a narrator of an NFL offensive linemen commercial. He introduced the starting lineups for the University of Illinois football team during ABC's telecast of the 2008 Rose Bowl. He also hosted a celebration rally for the Chicago Cubs playoff series in Chicago prior to the 2008 World Series. Steve Dahl has dubbed him "The Funniest Living Belushi".

In 2010, Belushi was cast in a pilot for CBS called The Defenders, a series about defense lawyers. The one-hour series premiered on September 22, 2010. In two episodes in 2011, Belushi was paired with Blues Brothers partner Dan Aykroyd. On May 15, 2011, The Defenders was canceled by CBS. In 2011, he was cast as corrupt businessman Harry Brock in Born Yesterday, which opened on Broadway in late April.

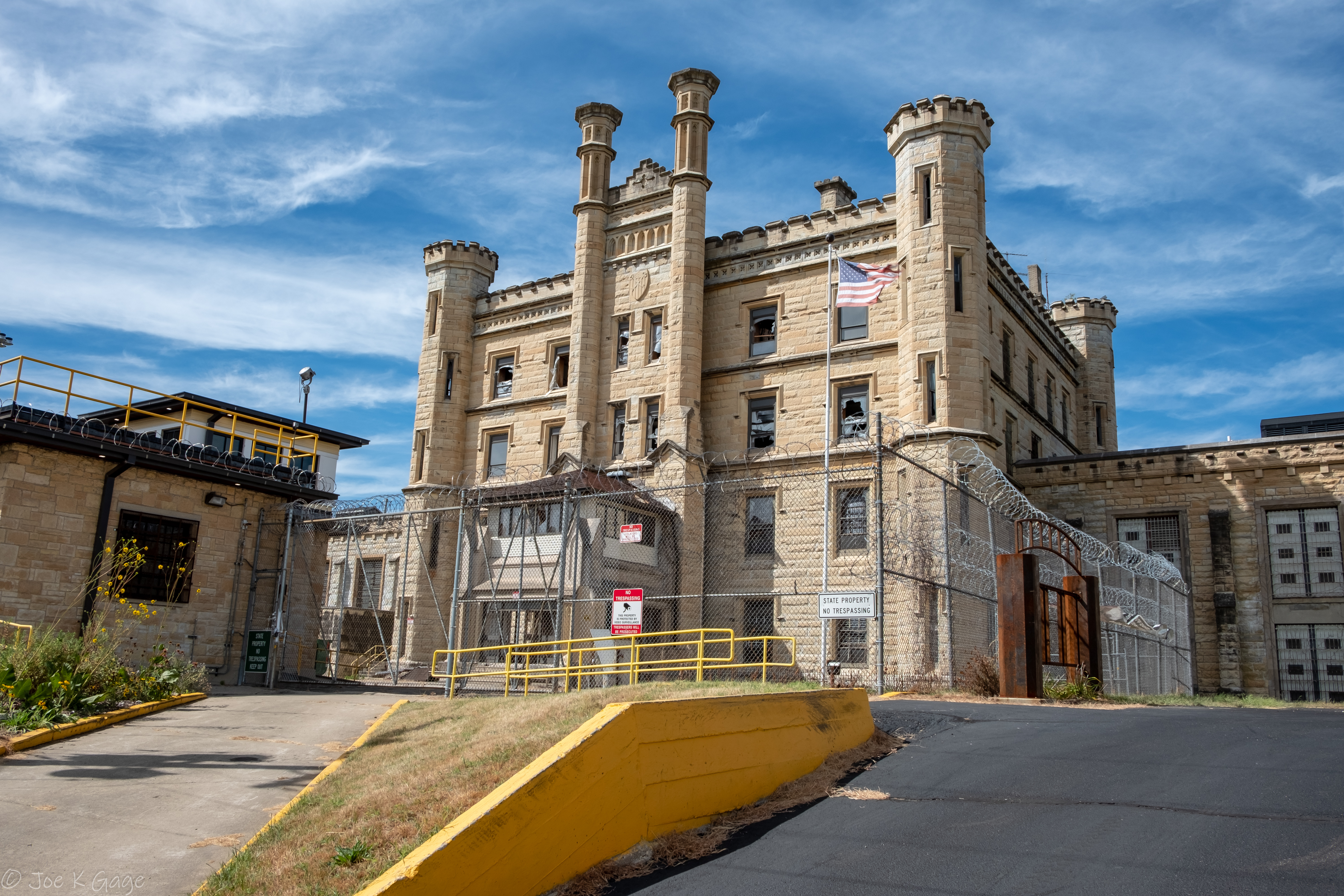
Old Joliet Prison Historical Site (2020)

In August 2020, Discovery Channel started airing a series about Belushi and his cannabis farm in Oregon, called Growing Belushi.

In August 2022, Belushi appeared as Brother Zee, with Aykroyd and The Blues Brothers Band, at the first Blues Brothers Con event held at Old Joliet Prison Historical Site. The two day festival also featured a screening of the film and performances from Mondo Cortez & The Chicago Blues Angels, Lil' Ed & The Blues Imperials, and Dave Weld & The Imperial Flames.

In March 2026, Belushi began hosting a new series on A&E, titled K9 PD with Jim Belushi. It is produced by Dan Abrams' Law & Crime.

== Personal life ==
Belushi has been married three times. On May 17, 1980, he married Sandra Davenport, who gave birth to their son, Robert James, on October 23, 1980. Belushi and Davenport divorced in 1988. Belushi was married to actress Marjorie Bransfield from 1990 to 1992. He married Jennifer Sloan on May 2, 1998; they share a daughter and a son. On March 5, 2018, Sloan filed for divorce from Belushi. The two later reconciled. Belushi filed for divorce from Sloan in 2021.

Belushi is closely linked to his Albanian heritage and received honorary Albanian citizenship, as well as the Honour of the Nation Decoration from the President of Albania, Bamir Topi, in 2008. He is an Eastern Orthodox Christian, visiting with the Ecumenical Patriarchate of Constantinople in 2010.

Belushi is a fan of the Chicago Blackhawks, Chicago Bears, Chicago Cubs, Chicago Bulls and the Chicago Fire.

Belushi had a legal battle and feud with his neighbor, actress Julie Newmar. She said that their conflicts stemmed from Belushi's attempt to "build a second house in the back", which she claimed was illegal due to zoning restrictions in their neighborhood requiring only one house per lot. In 2004, Belushi filed a $4 million lawsuit against Newmar, alleging "she harassed and defamed him". He also claimed she destroyed his fence, which Newmar denied. They ended the feud amicably in 2006, when Belushi invited Newmar to guest-star on According to Jim on an episode that satirized their conflict.

In 2011, Belushi announced he was suffering from gout, and became a spokesman for Savient Pharmaceuticals' educational campaign "Check Out Your Gout". He appeared on the cover of and was interviewed by Cigar Aficionado magazine.

Belushi endorsed the re-election campaign of Democratic President Barack Obama in 2012. During a Fox News interview, he said "When you talk to the President in private, he's a cool guy, who knows what he's doing. Besides, I'm from Chicago too."

Belushi built a getaway home in Eagle Point, Oregon, in 2015 where he now grows cannabis. By 2018, the size of his Eagle Point property had been expanded to 93 acres (38 ha). He is involved with fundraising for projects in Eagle Point and elsewhere in Southern Oregon, including the planned rebuilding of the Butte Creek Mill and the restoration of the Holly Theatre, in Medford. In 2018, he was living in Los Angeles "most of the time", The Oregonian reported, and living in Oregon part of the year. Per a 2018 article, Belushi indicated he planned on opening a pop-up cannabis dispensary in downtown Portland.

== Filmography ==
=== Film ===
Year	Title	Role	Notes
1978	The Fury	Beach Bum	
1980	The Cleansing	Bobby	Short
1981	Thief	Barry	
1982	Sugar or Plain	Bobby	Short
1983	Trading Places	Harvey	
1985	The Man with One Red Shoe	Morris	
1986	Salvador	Dr. Rock	
1986	About Last Night...	Bernie Litko	
1986	Jumpin' Jack Flash	Sperry Repair Man	
1986	Little Shop of Horrors	Patrick Martin	
1987	The Principal	Principal Rick Latimer	
1987	Real Men	Nick Pirandello	
1988	Red Heat	Sergeant Art Ridzik	
1989	Who's Harry Crumb?	Man on Bus	
1989	K-9	Detective Michael Dooley	
1989	Homer and Eddie	Homer Lanza	
1989	Wedding Band	Reverend	
1990	The Palermo Connection	Carmine Bonavia	
1990	Taking Care of Business	Jimmy Dworski	
1990	Masters of Menace	'Gypsy'	
1990	Mr. Destiny	Larry Joseph Burrows	
1991	Abraxas, Guardian of the Universe	Principal Rick Latimer	
1991	Only the Lonely	Officer Sal Buonarte	
1991	Diary of a Hitman	Shandy	
1991	Curly Sue	Bill Dancer	
1992	Once Upon a Crime	Neil Schwary	
1992	Traces of Red	Jack Dobson	
1993	Last Action Hero	Himself	
1994	Royce	Shane Royce	
1995	The Pebble and the Penguin	Rocko (voice)	
1995	Destiny Turns on the Radio	Tuerto	
1995	Canadian Bacon	Charles Jackal	
1995	Separate Lives	Tom Beckwith	
1996	Race the Sun	Frank Machi	
1996	Jingle All the Way	Mall Santa	
1997	Retroactive	Frank Lloyd	
1997	Living in Peril	Harrison/Oliver	
1997	Gold in the Streets	Mario	
1997	Bad Baby	Cornelius Goode (voice)	
1997	Gang Related	Detective Franklin "Frank" Divinci	
1997	Babes in Toyland	Gonzargo (voice)	
1997	Wag the Dog	Himself	
1998	Overnight Delivery	Overnight Delivery Boss	Video
1999	Angel's Dance	Stevie 'The Rose' Rosellini	
1999	The Florentine	Billy Belasco	
1999	Made Men	Bill 'The Mouth' Manucci	
1999	My Neighbors the Yamadas	Takashi Yamada (voice)	English dub, 2005
1999	The Nuttiest Nutcracker	Reginald The Mouse King (voice)	Video
1999	K-911	Detective Michael Dooley	Video
2000	Return to Me	Joe Dayton	
2001	Joe Somebody	Chuck Scarett	
2002	Snow Dogs	Demon (voice)	
2002	One Way Out	Harry Woltz	Video
2002	K-9: P.I.	Detective Michael Dooley	Video
2002	Pinocchio	The Farmer (voice)	
2002	Legend of the Lost Tribe	Tapir/Little Magnus (voice)	
2003	Easy Six	Elvis	
2004	DysEnchanted	Doctor (The Shrink)	Short
2005	Tugger: The Jeep 4x4 Who Wanted to Fly	Tugger (voice)	Video
2005	Hoodwinked!	Kirk (voice)	
2006	Behind the Smile	Jeffrey Stone	
2006	The Wild	Benny (voice)	
2006	Lolo's Cafe	Frank (voice)	Short
2007	Farce of the Penguins	'They're All Bitches' Penguin (voice)	Video
2007	Once Upon a Christmas Village	Santa Claus (voice)	Short
2007	Underdog	Dan Unger	
2008	Scooby-Doo! and the Goblin King	Glob (voice)	Video
2008	Snow Buddies	Saint Bernie (voice)	Video
2010	The Ghost Writer	John Maddox	
2011	Cougars, Inc.	Dan Fox	
2011	New Year's Eve	Building Super	
2012	Thunderstruck	Coach Amross	
2013	Legends of Oz: Dorothy's Return	Cowardly Lion (voice)	
2013	The Secret Lives of Dorks	Bronko	
2015	Home Sweet Hell	Les	
2016	The Whole Truth	Boone Lassiter	
2016	The Hollow Point	Diaz	
2016	Undrafted	Jim	
2016	Katie Says Goodbye	'Bear'	
2017	A Change of Heart	Hank	
2017	Sollers Point	Carol	
2017	Wonder Wheel	Humpty	
2022	Gigi & Nate	Dan Gibson	
2024	Fight Another Day	Duke	
2025	The Chronology of Water	Ken Kesey	
2025	Song Sung Blue	Tom D'Amato	
TBA	Green Bank †	TBA	Post-production

=== Television films ===
Year	Title	Role	Notes
1981	The Mystery of the Third Planet	Peter The Repeater Bird (voice)	English language dub
1984	The Best Legs in the Eight Grade	Saint Valentine	
1994	Royce	Shane Royce	
1994	Parallel Lives	Nick Dimas	
1995	Sahara	Sergeant Joe Gunn	
1997	Dog's Best Friend	Skippy (voice)	
1999	Justice	Frank Spello	
2000	Who Killed Atlanta's Children?	Pat Laughlin	
2006	Casper's Scared School	Alder (voice)	
2014	Stan Lee Mighty 7	Mr cross (voice)	
2017	Hey Arnold!: The Jungle Movie	Coach Wittenberg (voice)	

=== Television ===
Year	Title	Role	Notes
1978–79	Who's Watching the Kids?	Bert Gunkel	Main cast
1979	Working Stiffs	Ernie O'Rourke	Main cast
1982	Laverne & Shirley	'Wheezer'	Episode: "Of Mice and Men"
1983–85	Saturday Night Live	Himself/Cast Member	Main cast (season 9-10)
1984	Faerie Tale Theatre	Mario	Episode: "Pinocchio"
1986	Cinemax Comedy Experiment	Bob	Episode: "Jim Belushi in Birthday Boy"
1993	Wild Palms	Harry Wyckoff	Main cast
1993	The Building	Billy Shoe	Episode: "Yakkity Yak Don't Talk"
1994–97	Aaahh!!! Real Monsters	Simon The Monster Hunter (voice)	Recurring cast
1995	Duckman	Saul Monella (voice)	Episode: "America the Beautiful"
1995	Pinky and the Brain	Jack Maguire (voice)	Episode: "Das Mouse"
1995	Santo Bugito	Baby Face (voice)	Episode: "Load 'O Bees"
1995–96	Gargoyles	Fang (voice)	Recurring cast (season 2)
1995–2010	Biography	Himself	Recurring guest
1996	Dumb and Dumber	Duker, Manager	Episode: "Chipped Dip / Laundryland Lunacy"
1996	KaBlam!	Louie The Chameleon (voice)	Episode: "Built for Speed"
1996	Timon & Pumbaa	Male Warthog (voice)	Episode: "Home Is Where the Hog Is"
1996	The Tick	Mr. Fleener (voice)	Episode: "The Tick vs. Education"
1996–97	Mighty Ducks	Phil Palmfeather (voice)	Main cast
1996–99	Hey Arnold!	Coach Jack Wittenberg (voice)	Guest cast (season 1–4)
1997	Arena	Himself	Episode: "Cigars: Out of the Humidor"
1997	Cow and Chicken	Butch (voice)	Episode: "School Bully"
1997	Life with Louie	Jack (voice)	Episode: "The Making of a President"
1997	The Blues Brothers: The Animated Series	Jake (voice)	Main cast
1997	Total Security	Steve Wegman	Main cast
1997–98	The Larry Sanders Show	Himself	Guest cast (season 1–2)
1998	E! True Hollywood Story	Himself	Episode: "John Belushi"
1998	Hercules	Nestor (voice)	Guest cast (season 1–2)
1998	Stories from My Childhood	Peter The Repeater Bird (voice)	Episode: "Alice and The Mystery of the Third Planet"
2000–01	Beggars and Choosers	Freddy Falco	Recurring cast (season 2)
2001	ER	Dan Harris	Episode: "Piece of Mind"
2001–09	According to Jim	James "Jim" Orenthal	Main cast; executive producer
2002	The Jamie Kennedy Experiment	Himself	Episode: "Episode #1.17"
2002	Rugrats	Santa Claus (voice)	Episode: "Babies in Toyland"
2002	What's New, Scooby-Doo?	Asa Buckwald (voice)	Episode: "Scooby-Doo Christmas"
2002	Robbie the Reindeer	Santa Claus, Tapir (voice)	2 episodes
2002–06	The Adventures of Jimmy Neutron: Boy Genius	Coach Gruber (voice)	Recurring cast (season 1), guest (season 3)
2003	Mad TV	Himself	Episode: "Don Cheadle"
2003	Ozzy & Drix	Captain Quinine (voice)	Episode: "The Conqueror Worm"
2003	I'm with Her	Leslie Buren	Episode: "The Second Date"
2004	Less than Perfect	Eddie Smirkoff	Episode: "Arctic Nights"
2005	The Top 5 Reasons You Can't Blame...	Himself	Episode: "Steve Bartman for the Cubs 2003 Playoff Collapse"
2005	My Crazy Life	Himself	Episode: "Snow Jobs"
2005	Who's No. 1?	Himself	Episode: "Biggest Chokes"
2005	George Lopez	The Inspector	Episode: "George's Extreme Makeover: Holmes Edition"
2005	Fatherhood	Officer (voice)	Episode: "Truth or Scare"
2006	My First Time	Himself	Episode: "Sitcom Stylings"
2006	Second City: First Family of Comedy	Himself	Recurring guest
2008	Yin Yang Yo!	The Puffin (voice)	Episode: "League of Evil"
2009	Handy Manny	Sal (voice)	Episode: "Francisco Comes to Town/Broken Drawbridge"
2010–11	The Defenders	Nick Morelli	Main cast
2012	Doc McStuffins	Glo-Bo (voice)	Recurring cast (season 1)
2015	Serious Business	Himself	Episode: "Stand Up Guys"
2015	Building Belushi	Himself	Main cast
2015	Show Me a Hero	Angelo R. Martinelli	Recurring cast
2015–16	TripTank	Guy/Dad (voice)	Recurring cast (season 2)
2015–16	Good Girls Revolt	William 'Wick' McFadden	Recurring cast
2016	The 7D	Coach Coachy (voice)	Episode: "Jollyball Anyone?"
2017	Twin Peaks	Bradley Mitchum	Recurring cast (season 3)
2019	Trolls: The Beat Goes On!	Dad Cloud (voice)	Episode: "Two's a Cloud"
2020–23	Growing Belushi	Himself	Main cast
2022	Guy's All-American Road Trip	Himself	Episode: "Great Food With Great Friends"
2026–present	K9 PD with Jim Belushi	Host	Narrator; executive producer

=== Music videos ===
Year	Title	Artist	Role
1991	"2 Legit 2 Quit"	MC Hammer	Newscaster
2014	"Whoa Whoa Whoa"	Watsky	Lambourghini Owner

=== Video games ===
Year	Title	Role
1996	9: The Last Resort	Salty
1998	Goosebumps: Attack of the Mutant	Masked Mutant

== See also ==
- List of celebrities who own cannabis businesses
