= Hello Mary Lou: Prom Night II =

1987 film by Bruce Pittman

- Theatrical release poster
- Directed by: Bruce Pittman
- Written by: Ron Oliver
- Produced by: Peter R. Simpson
- Starring: Michael Ironside; Wendy Lyon; Justin Louis; Lisa Schrage; Richard Monette
- Cinematography: John Herzog
- Edited by: Nick Rotundo
- Music by: Paul Zaza
- Production company: Simcom Limited
- Distributed by: Norstar Entertainment (Canada); The Samuel Goldwyn Company (United States)
- Release date: October 16, 1987
- Running time: 97 minutes
- Country: Canada
- Language: English
- Budget: CA$2.5 million
- Box office: US$2.7 million

Hello Mary Lou: Prom Night II is a 1987 Canadian supernatural slasher film directed by Bruce Pittman, written by Ron Oliver, and starring Michael Ironside, Wendy Lyon, Louis Ferreira, and Lisa Schrage. It follows Vicki Carpenter, a high school student who becomes possessed by Mary Lou Maloney, a student who died at her high school prom in 1957. A sequel to the slasher film Prom Night (1980), it was originally made as a standalone film titled The Haunting of Hamilton High, but was retitled in order to capitalize on the success of the original Prom Night, also produced by Peter R. Simpson. The sole narrative connection between the two films is that they are set at the same high school.

Filmed in Edmonton, Alberta in 1986, the film was retitled Hello Mary Lou: Prom Night II by its Canadian distributor, Norstar Entertainment. It was released theatrically in the United States by The Samuel Goldwyn Company in October 1987, and grossed nearly $3 million at the U.S. box office. The film received mixed reviews from critics, with many drawing stylistic comparisons to various other films of the era, ranging from David Lynch's Blue Velvet to its horror contemporaries Carrie and A Nightmare on Elm Street.

The film went on to develop a cult following in the years after its release. The character Mary Lou Maloney would also appear in the next installment in the franchise, Prom Night III: The Last Kiss (1990).

== Plot ==
In 1957, before her senior prom, student Mary Lou Maloney attends a confessional, explaining to the priest her hypersexuality, before concluding that she is perfectly content with her sinning.

At the dance, student Billy Nordham discovers his date, Mary Lou, making out with another boy she was simultaneously dating, Buddy Cooper. Mary Lou breaks up with Billy, infuriating him. Shortly after, Mary Lou is announced prom queen, and Billy, looking for revenge, throws a stink bomb onto the stage as a prank. However, the fuse of the bomb accidentally ignites Mary Lou's dress, and she burns to death in front of the horrified students, but not before looking up and seeing who was responsible.

30 years later, student Vicki Carpenter goes looking for a dress in the school's theater prop room after being denied a new dress by her extremely religious mother, Virginia. There, Vicki finds an old costume trunk containing the cape and crown that Mary Lou was supposed to wear during the crowning ceremony. She takes the accessories and leaves them in the school overnight, inadvertently releasing Mary Lou's spirit from the trunk in the process. However, Vicki's friend Jess Browning is killed by Mary Lou's ghost after she tries to remove the jewels from her crown. Jess's death is ruled as a suicide brought on by an unexpected pregnancy.

Vicki begins experiencing surreal, nightmarish hallucinations involving Mary Lou and informs Buddy, who is now a Catholic priest. The following night, Buddy's bible combusts after he attempts to bless Mary Lou's grave. Worried, Buddy approaches Billy, who is now the high school principal. He tries to warn Billy that Mary Lou has come back from the grave, but is dismissed as crazy. Later, Vicki winds up in detention after she inadvertently slaps her rival, Kelly Henenlotter, who is eyeing the title of Prom Queen, during another hallucination. There, Vicki is wholly possessed by Mary Lou after she is pulled through a blackboard that transforms into a whirlpool, and later confronts Buddy at the church that night, murdering him after his refusal to consent to sexual advances, revealing her possession.

The next day, Vicki's friends notice that her personality, vocabulary and fashion style have changed drastically. One of Vicki's friends, Monica Waters, privately confronts Vicki in the girls' locker room, but after refuting Vicki's sexual advances, is shortly killed. Vicki then reveals her possession to her boyfriend, Craig, the son of Billy, taunting him as she sexually assaults him, insinuating he might be gay for not wanting her. Vicki then proceeds to sexually assault Billy and her father under the control of Mary Lou, leading to Billy searching out Mary Lou's grave, finding her body missing and Buddy's in its place, bound with a cross necklace in his mouth.

At the prom, Kelly, desperate to become prom queen, fellates her classmate Josh to change the Prom Queen voting results, as he manages the data via computer. When Josh changes the outcome to make Kelly the winner, Vicki electrocutes him to death through his computer and reverses his changes. Once announced as prom queen, Vicki goes up on stage and eagerly waits for her crown. Before she can get it, Billy shoots her multiple times, to the horror of the crowd. Shortly after, the now-fully resurrected Mary Lou bursts out of Vicki's body and uses her powers to wreak havoc on the prom, killing Kelly in the process. Billy tries to shoot the undead Mary Lou, but falls and injures himself.

Mary Lou sets her sights on Craig, whom she chases into the prop room. She attempts to use the trunk that held her spirit to open a vortex to suck Craig into the underworld, but before she can, Billy arrives with her crown and finally gives it to Mary Lou, seemingly bringing an end to her murderous wrath. Vicki, now free of possession and unharmed by the bullet wounds, comes out of the trunk and reunites with Craig. Billy offers to drive them both home after making sure they are both okay. After they get into his car, however, Billy reveals that he is now possessed by Mary Lou, before driving off with the terrified Vicki and Craig.

== Cast ==
- Michael Ironside as Principal Bill "Billy" Nordham
  - Steve Atkinson as Young Billy Nordham
- Wendy Lyon as Vicki Carpenter
- Justin Louis as Craig Nordham
- Richard Monette as Father Buddy Cooper
  - Robert Lewis as Young Buddy Cooper
- Lisa Schrage as Mary Lou Maloney
  - Lorretta Bailey as Mary Lou Maloney (creature)
- Terri Hawkes as Kelly Hennenlotter
- Beverley Hendry as Monica Waters
- Brock Simpson as Josh
- Beth Gondek as Jess Browning
- Wendell Smith as Walt Carpenter
- Judy Mahbey as Virginia Carpenter
- John Pyper-Ferguson as Eddie Wood
- Vincent Gale as Rejected Boy
- Michael Evans as Matthew Dante
- Dennis Robinson as Mr. Craven
- Larry Musser as Mr. O'Bannon
- Glen Gretzky as Robert
- David Robertson as Mr. King

== Production ==
=== Development ===
The project, originally titled The Haunting of Hamilton High, marked Ron Oliver's first screenplay. Oliver incorporated many references and homages to past horror films in the script, including A Nightmare on Elm Street (1984), Carrie (1976), and The Exorcist (1973). In addition, several characters were named after popular horror film directors and other cult figures, including John Carpenter, George A. Romero, Wes Craven, Frank Henenlotter, Stephen King, John Waters, Dan O'Bannon, Edward D. Wood Jr. and Tod Browning.

Peter R. Simpson and his Toronto-based production company Simcom Limited produced the film; Simcom had also produced Prom Night (1980). The media company Allarcom also co-funded the production. Supervising executive producer Ray Sager had previously served as an executive producer of several other Canadian-produced horror films, including My Bloody Valentine, Terror Train (both 1981), and Humongous (1982). Sager likened the film to a "horror version of Back to the Future."

=== Filming ===
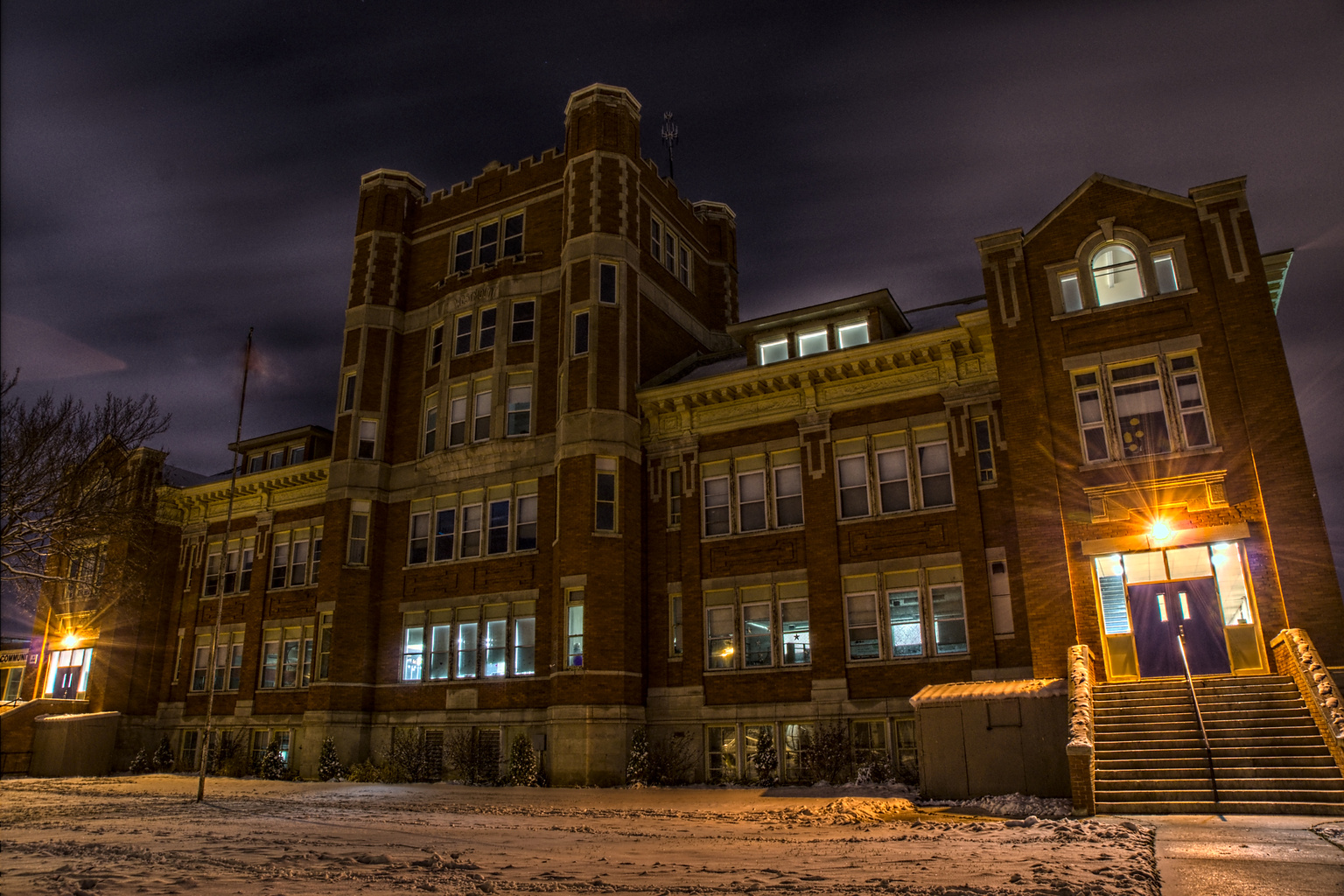
Filming took place partly at Westmount Junior High School in Edmonton

Principal photography took place on location in Edmonton, Alberta on a budget of approximately CA$2.5 million. Filming began in early August 1986. The production chose Edmonton due to the local school board's enthusiasm about shooting a film in the city, as well as the fact that the local schools had the neo-Gothic architecture the producers had envisioned. Filming locations included Westmount Junior High School and Highlands Junior High School in Edmonton. Other portions of the film were shot inside an abandoned furniture store.

To distinguish the 1950s-set portions of the film from the contemporary 1987 setting, director Bruce Pittman used long shots and "fifties"-style camera angles for the former, while employing "flashy" techniques for the latter. Filming was completed by October 1987.

=== Special effects ===
Jim Doyle, a special effects designer based in Los Angeles, served as the effects coordinator on the film. Doyle had previously worked on Wes Craven's A Nightmare on Elm Street (1984), and Francis Ford Coppola's One from the Heart (1982), and WarGames (1983). Some sequences required elaborate set-ups to film, such as the surrealistic sequence in which Vicki Carpenter (Wendy Lyon) collapses into the chalkboard, which becomes a metallic liquid: Though only a 45-second sequence, the production crew scheduled five days to complete the scene, at an estimated cost of $2,000 per hour. Doyle designed the set with the blackboard lying flat on the floor, and filmed it so as to appear that it was standing on end.

For the sequence in which Mary Lou Maloney (Lisa Schrage) is lit on fire during the opening prom sequence, stuntwoman Leslie Munro was hired to perform the stunt.

=== Post-production ===
Producer Peter Simpson and The Samuel Goldwyn Company reshot a significant portion of the film before it completed production, employing screenwriter Ron Oliver to direct the new scenes himself on a budget of $100,000. Oliver sought advice from director Wes Craven when undertaking the reshoots.

After reshoots were completed, the film rebranded as a sequel to the slasher Prom Night and retitled Hello Mary Lou: Prom Night II by its production company, Simcom, peripherally connecting the films. Simpson later stated that he felt branding the film a continuation of Prom Night damaged its reception.

== Music ==
The musical score for Hello Mary Lou: Prom Night II was composed by Paul Zaza, who had composed the score for the original film as well as numerous Canadian-produced horror films. The score was released for the first time on vinyl LP and cassette on April 22, 2003, by Terror Vision Records.

== Release ==
Norstar Entertainment distributed Hello Mary Lou: Prom Night II in Canada, releasing it on October 16, 1987. The Samuel Goldwyn Company distributed the film in the United States, releasing it the same day in New York City, Philadelphia, and Tampa. The release expanded to other U.S. cities on November 13, 1987, including Houston, Los Angeles, and Spokane.

=== Home media ===
Norstar Home Video released a VHS edition of Hello Mary Lou: Prom Night II in Canada in April 1988. Virgin Vision concurrently released the film on VHS in the United States.

Alliance Atlantis released the film on DVD in Canada on June 24, 2003, in a pan and scan edition sourced from a video transfer. MGM Home Entertainment and 20th Century Fox Home Entertainment later acquired the rights to the film and released a remastered widescreen DVD edition on April 1, 2008. Echo Bridge Home Entertainment released the film as part of a 10-film DVD collection in 2014.

In March 2025, Synapse Films announced that they were preparing a 4K UHD Blu-ray release of the film.

== Reception ==
=== Box office ===
Hello Mary Lou: Prom Night II US$911,351 during its opening weekend in the United States at 343 theaters, ranking number 10 a at the U.S. box office. The film went on to gross a total of $2.7 million at the box office. The film was more of a success on home video.

=== Critical response ===
==== Contemporary ====
Kevin Thomas of the Los Angeles Times gave the film a positive review, praising Lyon's performance and drawing comparisons to Blue Velvet, adding: "You don't ... have to take Hello Mary Lou at all seriously, and it probably would be a mistake to do so. Certainly, it's not on the deeply personal, highly idiosyncratic artistic level of the David Lynch film, but it is a splendid example of what imagination can do with formula genre material." According to screenwriter Ron Oliver, the favorable review in the Los Angeles Times inspired him to relocate to Los Angeles two years later: "I remember sitting back down at my desk and thinking, I’m going to move to America—because they understand the sensibility of quality trash." Critic Joe Bob Briggs championed the film, heralding it as "probably the finest pure-dee old-fashioned dead-teenager movie of the last two years."

Juan Carlos Coto of the South Florida Sun-Sentinel also reviewed the film favorably, writing that "despite its lack of original material, this film is well-scripted, directed, and acted–and surprisingly entertaining." The Atlanta Constitution's Eleanor Ringel similarly noted, "for all its rip-offs, Hello Mary Lou is never a total chore to sit through. As vengeance-minded females go, Ms. Schrage makes Glenn Close in Fatal Attraction come off like a Girl Scout leader," adding that it serves as a "black-comic commentary on the whole notion of prom queens." Joe Baltake of The Sacramento Bee noted that part of the film's "lurid appeal [is] its presentation of teen girls as evil narcissists," and "high school life as the ultimate sociopathic playpen." He went on to describe the film as a "hack-'em-up version" of Cinderella. Soren Andersen of The News Tribune praised the film's special effects and horror sequences, concluding: "The inventiveness of Mary Lou's effects and the anger coursing through it make it an effective schlock shocker. It proves that there are still some genuine shudders left in a seemingly threadbare formula."

Vincent Canby of The New York Times gave the film a mixed review and described its extended "grand guignol" finale, writing: "Bruce Pittman, the director, and Ron Oliver, who wrote the screenplay, have constructed the movie as if it were a gourmet banquet for toddlers. From the first course to the last, it's all ice cream." Bill Cosford from The Arizona Republic called it "a badly made film, as awkward as can be, and long stretches of it make no sense whatsoever. Nor does it manage, as the better slasher films do, to re-create a high-school milieu of even passing authenticity." Ted Mahar of The Oregonian expressly disliked the film, awarding it a one-star rating and describing it as "not so much a story as an occasion for a glut of not necessarily related special effects." TV Guide awarded the film one out of five stars, praising the special effects and Pittman's direction, but ultimately deemed the film "all too predictable."

Numerous critics noted parallels and homages to other horror films, such as Carrie (1976), The Exorcist (1973), and A Nightmare on Elm Street (1984). (Note: Attributed to multiple critical reviews.) Betsy Sherman of The Boston Globe gave the film a mixed review, describing it as a "miserly slice-and-dicer: Carrie without the bucket of blood," though she conceded it is "somewhat livened by the presence of Michael Ironside." Stephen Hunter of The Baltimore Sun alternately described Ironside's talents as "waste[d]" and criticized the screenplay as "rudimentary." The Philadelphia Daily News's Ben Yagoda panned the film, writing that it "can be credited with nothing other than providing temporary employment for a group of untalented individuals," and drawing comparisons between Peggy Sue Got Married (1986) and The Exorcist (1973). Richard Harrington of The Washington Post drew similar comparisons, writing that the film "may be derivative, but for the most part it's clever enough to trade on its sources with humor and class. It's Peggy Sue Lives on Elm Street, with dollops of Carrie, The Exorcist and a half dozen other genre stalwarts."

==== Modern appraisal ====
Hello Mary Lou: Prom Night II went on to develop a cult following in the years after its original release. On the review aggregator website Rotten Tomatoes, 56% of 16 critics' reviews are positive, with an average rating of 5.3/10.

In a retrospective assessment, film scholar and critic John Kenneth Muir wrote, "In the annals of unnecessary sequels, Hello Mary Lou: Prom Night II rates high. Contrarily, in the ranks of 1980s horror movies, it's merely a mediocre effort." Film scholar Mike Mayo said the film is only a Prom Night sequel by title, and that it in fact bears more similarity to A Nightmare on Elm Street (1984). Writing for Syfy in 2017, Rebecca Pahle praised the film's special effects and acting, and deemed it a "slasher masterwork."

Jacob Knight of ComingSoon.net similarly praised the film in a 2015 retrospective, writing: "It's a shame Hello Mary Lou never became a bigger hit, because it's an oft-forgotten gem of the horror genre, standing the test of time nearly thirty years on. An amalgamation of national tax shelter weirdness, brazen borrowing from better films, and the tossing of creative caution to the wind, Pittman's picture evokes numerous classics while indubitably carving its own identity."

== Sources ==
- Harper, Jim (2004). Legacy of Blood: A Comprehensive Guide to Slasher Movies. Manchester, England: Critical Vision. ISBN 978-1-900-48639-2.
- Mayo, Mike (2011). The Horror Show Guide: The Ultimate Frightfest of Movies. Visible Ink Press. ISBN 978-1-578-59459-7.
- Muir, John Kenneth (2011). Horror Films of the 1980s. Vol. 1. Jefferson, North Carolina: McFarland & Company. ISBN 978-0-786-45501-0.
- Stine, Scott Aaron (2003). The Gorehound's Guide to Splatter Films of the 1980s. Jefferson, North Carolina: McFarland & Company. ISBN 978-1-476-61132-7.
