= Bob Gold & Associates =

- Industry: Public relations
- Founded: 1997
- Headquarters: Redondo Beach, California
- Key people: Bob Gold (Principal), Chris Huppertz (Vice President), Beth Braen (Vice President)
- Website: bobgoldpr.com

Bob Gold & Associates is an independent Southern California-based publication relations agency founded by Bob Gold in 1997. The company has offices in New York City, Chicago and Southern California. Bob Gold & Associates is also a co-founder of the Whiteoaks International Network, serving organizations around the world with 15 partnering agencies in 5 continents.

== History ==
Bob Gold & Associates was founded by University of Southern California (USC) Annenberg School Alumni Bob Gold. The firm opened its first office in Torrance, California in 1997, before relocating to nearby Redondo Beach, California in 2013.

The PR firm serves clients nationally in North America as well as internationally with clients located in Europe and Asia.

The PR agency has helped launch companies and programming networks, re-branded others, and created campaigns for numerous start-ups. Principle Bob Gold serves on the Board of Directors for the (SCTE) Society of Cable Telecommunications Engineers Foundation where he is the only non-engineer to serve on the board. In 2007 Gold was inducted into the Cable TV Pioneers Hall of Fame and has served on numerous committees and boards that range from the Academy of Television Arts and Sciences to the Alzheimer’s Association, USC Annenberg Alumni Board and the Long Beach Grand Cru benefiting the Los Angeles Legal Aid Foundation.

== Services ==
Bob Gold & Associates specializes in communications for companies working in the industries of: Cable TV, Telecommunications, High Tech, Sports and Customer Care.

Clients from the past two decades include: Adelphia, ESPN, Channel Master, Residents Medical, Hitachi Consulting, EchoStar, Clearleap, and Sling Media, among others.

== Notable work ==
Bob Gold & Associates produced for Charter Communications the original Jim Belushi and Dan Aykroyd Have Love Will Travel, a TV special that was an exclusive video on demand concert for Charter Digital Cable subscribers.

In December 2013, Bob Gold & Associates arranged for a high-profile interview conducted by New York Times Sports TV columnist Richard Sandomir and beIN Sports La Liga on-air commentator Ray Hudson.

The company represented Sprint’s new and expanding 4G LTE network in Southern California, with an event headlined by former Los Angeles Lakers star Pau Gasol. Gasol participated in a four-hour event that included a game of H-O-R-S-E at a Los Angeles Community rec center (approx. 350 attendees), signing autographs and taking pictures at a Sprint store (approx. 200 attendees). The event hashtag #SprintGasol was used in 120 tweets with more than 2,440,294 million accounts reached.

In the summer of 2013, the Ventura County Planning Department had given preliminary approval to allowing the housing of five tigers in a residential Malibu neighborhood within Ventura County. Residents only had a matter of days to appeal the decision to try to stop one of the world’s most dangerous animals to be housed in their backyards. Bob Gold & Associates ran a campaign to inform the public about the situation and assist in generating public outcry against the highly dangerous initial county decision. The planning department ultimately voted against housing tigers in Malibu. As a result of their successful campaign, they won the 2014 PRism Award for the Pro Bono Program category.

Los Angeles Business Journal ranked Bob Gold & Associates #28 Best Public Relations Agency in their 2015 The List issue. Bob Gold & Associates also placed #9 on topPRagencies' Top 10 Telecommunications Public Relations Agencies in 2013, and was selected as the top PR firm for the month of January 2014.

In February 2017, The Media & Entertainment Services Alliance (MESA), a community of senior-level technology executives and companies involved in media & entertainment, named Bob Gold & Associates to support its newly launched member awareness initiative.
