= Food of the Gods II =

- Directed by: Damian Lee
- Written by: Richard Bennett; E. Kim Brewster
- Produced by: Damian Lee; David Mitchell
- Starring: Paul Coufos; Lisa Schrage
- Cinematography: Curtis Petersen
- Edited by: David Mitchell
- Music by: Dennis Haines; Stephen W. Parsons
- Production companies: Canadian Entertainment Investors No. 1 and Company Limited Partnership; Rose & Ruby Productions
- Distributed by: Carolco Pictures; Concorde Pictures; Centaur Films Inc.
- Release date: 19 May 1989
- Running time: 91 minutes
- Country: Canada
- Language: English
- Budget: $3,500,000

Food of the Gods II, sometimes referred to as Gnaw: Food of the Gods II as well as Food of the Gods Part 2, is a 1989 Canadian science fiction film that is a very loose sequel to the 1976 Bert I. Gordon film The Food of the Gods, based on the 1904 H.G. Wells novel of the same name. It is a sequel in name only, as its plot bears no relation to the 1976 film.

The main themes of the film are animal testing and size change. In the film, a growth serum is tested on lab rats, turning them into giants. While the animals rampage, the use of the same serum on cancer cells causes massive tumors.

== Plot ==
Dr. Neil Hamilton receives a call from his mentor Dr. Kate Travis about a young boy named Bobby, whose deficient growth has been treated with Travis' experimental serum. Bobby has swiftly and unexpectedly grown larger than a full-grown adult and become violent. To find an antidote, Neil takes a sample of the serum back to his lab at a university science complex. There, animal-rights activists led by Mark Hales and Neil's girlfriend Alex Reed are protesting the work of Prof. Edmund Delhurst, who claims to study cancer but in fact subjects animals to experimentation seeking a cure for baldness.

Neil and his assistant Joshua inject the serum into some lab rats. That night, the activists (minus Alex) break into the complex to trash Delhurst's lab and accidentally release the now-giant rats, which kill Mark and escape into the campus' utility tunnels. Police Lieutenant Weizel does not believe the surviving activists' statements despite Neil's corroboration about the serum, and Dean White hires a pair of exterminators to handle what he believes are normal-sized rats.

The giant rats kill several people, including Louis, one of the exterminators; the surviving activists, Al and Angie, escape. But the giant rats apparently kill whoever tried to hunt down the animals themselves. Delhurst's assistant, a janitor named Zeke, is attacked, but Jacques, the surviving exterminator, despite taking several bites to his arms and face, appears and burns the rat. Later, a night watchman tries to escape some rats, though he is killed off-screen. Alex discovers the body of a workman (a man forced from his car and chased by rats) while two other men killed by the rats, whose bodies are still in the car, are discovered by the police. Although Lieutenant Weizel is convinced of the threat, Dean White remains skeptical and refuses to shut down the campus, due to the upcoming grand opening of the university's new sports complex. When Joshua falls victim to the rats, Neil attacks Dean White and is fired.

Delhurst steals the serum sample and tests it, first on Neil's pet rat Louise, then on a sample of cancer cells. He accidentally contaminates himself with treated cells and dies within minutes as his entire body develops massive tumors. Neil returns to the lab to retrieve the antidote he has created, testing it by destroying Delhurst's transformed corpse. Meanwhile, the rats attack the swim competition being held in the new sports complex, killing several people, including Dean White.

Neil uses the enlarged but still-docile Louise, who is in heat, to lure the giant (male) rats into the university courtyard, where Weizel and his men gun them all down. Neil phones Dr. Travis to inform her of the antidote, but it is too late; Bobby, now psychotic and larger than ever, kills Travis while she is on the phone and escapes.

== Cast ==
- Paul Coufos as Dr. Neil Hamilton
- Lisa Schrage as Alex Reed
- Colin Fox as Prof. Edmund Delhurst
- Frank Pellegrino as Joshua
- Jackie Burroughs as Dr. Kate Travis
- Réal Andrews as Mark Hales
- Stuart Hughes as Al
- Karen Hines as Angie
- David B. Nichols as Dean White
- Michael Copeman as Lieutenant Weizel
- Sean Mitchell as Bobby
- Robert Kennedy as Brett
- Frank Moore as Jacques
- Howard Jerome as Louis

== Reception ==
Creature Feature gave the film two out of five stars, finding the effects ludicrous. Paul Lê of Bloody Disgusting said of the film, "As positively junky and sleazy as Gnaw: Food of the Gods II is, it is also immensely fun. The dead-serious tone clashes with the film’s fundamentally preposterous nature, and the audience laughs when the actors themselves cannot. The story gets odder with every passing minute, and the overall execution is bewildering. Even after all the skewering, this sequel still manages to outdo the original in some respects. How it goes about doing so would never be accepted as “good” in critic circles, but among B-movie fans, Gnaw is a treasure trove of absurdity and mindless entertainment."
