= Rose & Ruby Productions =

Canadian sports promotion and film production company

- Company logo (1987–92)
- Type: Event and film production company
- Founded: 30 June 1977
- Headquarters: Toronto, Ontario, Canada
- Key people: Damian Lee (President); David Mitchell (Vice President, until circa 1990)

Rose & Ruby Productions, also known as Rose and Ruby Pictures, was a Canadian sports promotion and film production company founded in 1977. It was one of the country's notable producers of televised sports programming before establishing itself as a purveyor of genre movies in the 1980s and early 1990s. For much of its history, the company was anchored by directors Damian Lee and David Mitchell.

== History ==
Rose & Ruby Productions' originally specialized in the organization of competitions for "everyman" athletes, which it placed on television for the benefit of a corporate sponsor, a concept that Lee had popularized in the Canadian market shortly before the creation of Rose & Ruby itself. Many of these programs were seen on the Canadian version of Wide World of Sports broadcast on the CTV network. The company later graduated to sports featuring professional or established amateur athletes, often for CTV as well. In 1977, Rose & Ruby tried to set up a professional tennis tournament for the following March at Toronto's Maple Leaf Gardens to replace the dormant Rothmans International, but the event did not proceed. In 1983, the company also applied to the CRTC for a license to operate a pay sports television channel.

While it did not get its own channel, the emergence of premium cable outlets looking to satisfy Canadian content obligations, such as First Choice, opened the door to branch out into fiction content. Rose & Ruby also took advantage of the tax shelter opportunities that were synonymous with Canadian film financing at the time although, according to Lee, the boom of international pre-sales during the second half of the 1980s allowed the company to distance itself from that sometimes stigmatized model. Bodybuilder Franco Columbu, who contributed to several of Rose & Ruby's mid- to late 1980s features, was a partner in the company and was listed as its American representative at the time. In later years, Rose & Ruby also named veteran cameraman and director of photography Curtis Petersen as its Vice President of Production.

In 1993, Rose & Ruby entered a multi-picture financing partnership with Menahem Golan's 21st Century Films, which was struggling to find banking support. It included National Lampoon's Last Resort (21st Century was initially mentioned as co-producer but later only as international distributor), Death Wish V: The Face of Death and the less commercial Crime and Punishment. However, Lee was not credited in the final version of Crime and Punishment, and although he remained on board as producer of the other films, the Rose & Ruby label was phased out from them as well. After that batch of Golan collaborations, Lee focused his efforts on another outfit headquartered on the same premises, called Richmond House, to whom former Rose & Ruby associate David Mitchell briefly collaborated early on.

== Filmography ==
=== Sports (select list) ===
Year	Title		Broadcaster/Distributor
1978–1984	The Great Canadian Challenge/The Gillette Challenge	Fitness	CTV
1978–1982	Datsun Special	Gymkhana	CTV
1979	GMC Jimmy Showdown	Gymkhana	CTV
1979	Canadian Frisbee Championships	Frisbee	CTV
1981	Cointreau Cup	Racquet sports	CTV
1981–8?	Yesterday in the CFL	Gridiron football	CTV
1982	Hitachi Mile	Running	CTV
1982	Avon Women's Marathon	Running	CTV
1983	National Fitness Test	Fitness	CTV (unconfirmed)
1985	WPSA Hardball	Squash	CTV; Rose & Ruby Prods (video)

=== Fiction ===
Year	Title	Domestic distributor	Notes
1983	Copper Mountain: A Club Med Experience	First Choice (TV premiere)	
1984	Reno & the Doc	First Choice (TV premiere); Pan-Canadian Film Distributors (theatrical)	With American Cinema Marketing
1986	Screwball Academy	American Cinema Marketing; Pan-Canadian Film Distributors	Also known as Loose Ends; With Shapiro Entertainment (Non-North American distribution)
1986	Busted Up	Pan-Canadian Film Distributors	With Shapiro Entertainment
1987	Circle Man	Cineplex Odeon Films	Also known as Last Man Standing; With Shapiro Entertainment
1987	City of Shadows	Cineplex Odeon Films	With Shapiro Entertainment
1988	The Miles Ahead	First Choice (TV premiere); Cineplex Odeon Films (home video)	Also known as Hot Sneakers; With American Cinema Marketing
1988	Watchers	Alliance Releasing	With Concorde Pictures and Carolco Pictures
1989	Food of the Gods II	Alliance Releasing	Also known as Gnaw: Food of the Gods II; With Concorde Pictures and Carolco Pictures
1989	Thunderground	Cineplex Odeon Films	With Shapiro Glickenhaus Entertainment
1991	Abraxas, Guardian of the Universe	Cineplex Odeon Films	With Phoenix Entertainment Group
1991	Ski School	Famous Players (Cineplex Odeon Films in some sources)	With Moviestore Entertainment (USA Distribution)
1991	Deadly Descent	First Choice (TV Premiere)	
1992	Baby on Board	Cinépix/Famous Players Distribution	With Sandy Howard Productions, ABC, and World Entertainment Network
1994	National Lampoon's Last Resort	C/FP Video (video premiere)	Uncredited; With Amritraj Entertainment
1994	Death Wish V: The Face of Death	Cinépix/Famous Players Distribution	Uncredited; With 21st Century Film Corporation
