= Lisa Schrage =

Canadian film and television actress

- Born: March 2, 1963 (age 63); Toronto, Ontario, Canada
- Other name: Lisa Schrag
- Occupation: Actress
- Years active: 1981–1999
- Spouse: Jorge Montesi (m. 1997)
- Children: 2

Lisa Schrage /ʃrɛɡ/ (born March 2, 1963) is a retired Canadian film and television actress. She is best known for her role as Mary Lou Maloney in the 1987 Canadian horror film Hello Mary Lou: Prom Night II.

== Early life ==
Schrage was born in Toronto, Ontario, to a Jewish family. Schrage studied acting and appeared in commercials in Toronto.

== Career ==
She appeared in The Wonderful World of Disney television film Young Again (1986) and the drama Dreams Beyond Memory (1987) before being cast as Mary Lou Maloney, a villainous ghost in the 1987 horror film Hello Mary Lou: Prom Night II. The film went on to develop a cult following in the years after its release.

Schrage subsequently starred in the science fiction horror film Food of the Gods II (1989), followed by the Hong Kong-filmed action film China White (also 1989), directed by Ronny Yu.

== Personal life ==
Schrage is married to Chilean director Jorge Montesi. She has two sons.

In the 1990s, Schrage retired from acting and began a career as a movement therapist.

== Filmography ==
=== Film ===
| Year | Title | Role | Notes | Ref. |
|---|---|---|---|---|
| 1981 | The Amateur | Teenage Girl #1 | | |
| 1986 | Young Again | Girl at disco | The Wonderful World of Disney television film | |
| 1987 | Shades of Love: Indigo Autumn | Jill Jamieson | Television film; credited as Lisa Schrag | |
| 1987 | Dreams Beyond Memory | Jennifer | | |
| 1987 | Hello Mary Lou: Prom Night II | Mary Lou Maloney | | |
| 1989 | Food of the Gods II | Alex Reed | | |
| 1989 | China White | Anne Michaels | | |
| 1998 | Sweet Deception | Eva Newcomb | Television film | |
| 1999 | Assault on Death Mountain | Laura Berringer | Television film | |

=== Television ===
| Year | Title | Role | Notes | Ref. |
|---|---|---|---|---|
| 1987–1988 | Night Heat | Victoria / Ellen Kozak / Terry Garfield | 3 episodes | |
| 1989 | Alfred Hitchcock Presents | Kelly | Episode: "If Looks Could Kill" | |
| 1988 | The Twilight Zone | Candy | Episode: "The Trunk" | |
| 1992 | Tropical Heat | Lisa McGrath | Episode: "Double Fault" | |
| 1998 | The Sentinel | Kelly Temple | Episode: "Prisoner X" | |
| 1999 | Three | Mrs. Starke | Episode: "Uncontrollable Urge"; unaired | |

== Sources ==
- Emert, Matt; Murdock, Tim (July 30, 2022). "Hello Mary Lou: Prom Night II (1987) Lisa Schrage Interview". Happy Horror Time. Event occurs at 23:34. Archived from the original on February 27, 2026 – via YouTube.
- "Interview with Lisa Schrage of Hello Mary Lou: Prom Night II". Movie Junkie John. April 11, 2025. Archived from the original on March 1, 2026 – via YouTube.
