= Growing Belushi =

American television series

- Genre: Reality, Documentary
- Country of origin: United States
- Original language: English
- No. of seasons: 3
- No. of episodes: 12

Original release
- Network: Discovery Channel
- Release: August 19, 2020 – May 10, 2023

Growing Belushi is an American television series on the Discovery Channel, featuring Jim Belushi and his cannabis farm in southern Oregon.

== Series overview ==
Season	Episodes	Originally released	
Season	Episodes	First released	Last released
1	3	August 19, 2020	September 2, 2020
2	3	January 19, 2022	February 2, 2022
3	6	April 5, 2023	May 10, 2023

== Episodes ==
=== Season 1 (2020) ===
No. overall	No. in season	Title	Original release date	US viewers (millions)
1	1	"The Dope of Oregon"	August 19, 2020	N/A
Actor and comedian Jim Belushi is adding another expertise to his repertoire…cannabis farmer! Jim learns the hard way that the "I'll do it myself" mentality leads to mistakes. Later, Jim discovers that his family's support for his new endeavor is waning.
2	2	"A Mission from God"	August 26, 2020	N/A
Jim and Chris are on their way to Idaho for a Blues Brothers show with Dan Aykroyd, where Jim plans to ask Dan for the right to use the Blues Brothers' brand. Dan sets Jim on a "Mission from God" to Colombia, in pursuit of elusive cannabis strains.
3	3	"The Weed Brothers"	September 2, 2020	N/A
After losing the seeds of two prized Colombian strains, Jim and Chris are back at square one. The cousins explore Pablo Escobar's old haunts while trying to salvage their trip. Back home, they celebrate the harvest of Jim's strains with a big party.

=== Season 2 (2022) ===
No. overall	No. in season	Title	Original release date	US viewers (millions)
4	1	"The Buds are Back in Town"	January 19, 2022	N/A
Jim learns he must rebuild his cannabis farm from the soil up. And after killing Dan Aykroyd's Blues Brothers marijuana plants, Jim must save the partnership from going up in smoke.
5	2	"Edible Arrangements"	January 26, 2022	N/A
Jim tests out his cannabis-infused ice cream on good friend Guy Fieri and hazes son Jared to gauge his readiness to take over the farm one day.
6	3	"The Pot Thickens"	February 2, 2022	N/A
Jim's friends gather to celebrate his birthday, but an unexpected disaster threatens the future of Belushi's Farm.

=== Season 3 (2023) ===
No. overall	No. in season	Title	Original release date	US viewers (millions)
7	1	"Burning Down the House"	April 5, 2023	N/A
A suspicious fire on the farm has Jim Belushi and his staff fearing for their safety and the future of the farm. But after being presented with exciting expansion opportunities, Jim makes a brash decision that could send the entire business up in smoke.
8	2	"On the Road Again"	April 12, 2023	N/A
Going against everyone's wishes, Jim Belushi makes a major decision that creates chaos for his entire staff. Meanwhile, with Jim and Chris away on business, Larry sets his sights on taking over the farm.
9	3	"Big Sur Holy Weed"	April 19, 2023	N/A
Dan Aykroyd presents Jim and Chris with a hair-brained scheme that sends them deep into the woods of Big Sur, California, in search of a legendary marijuana seed. Meanwhile, Larry investigates a murder on the farm.
10	4	"Sweet Home Chicago'"	April 26, 2023	N/A
Chris sells Jim on buying a turnkey facility in Illinois, but the operation turns out to be growing bunk weed and will need a complete overhaul; back on the farm, Larry continues his reign of terror.
11	5	"Can't Be Two Places at Once"	May 3, 2023	N/A
Jim and Chris' trip to Mississippi, for their final leg of this part of their national expansion, comes to a halt when they discover their clone plants are sick and in no shape to move onto their next stage of growth. With only 1-2 weeks to fix the issue and nurse the plants back to health, Jim has no choice but to stay back on the farm and send Larry to Mississippi in his place. A decision Chris adamantly disagrees with. Larry has finally started to find his footing in Oregon. But will he buckle under the pressure of walking a mile in Jim's shoes?
12	6	"Coming to Albania!"	May 10, 2023	9.9
Jim and Chris take a trip to Albania to meet the prime minister for a business meeting, but before all that; at the airport Jim lost his bags at the British Airport and stayed 98 hours in the same clothes but before their meeting with the prime minister, their good friend Jeremy helps along the way, but in the end is called by a fan an “Icon”; meanwhile Larry tries to sell 500 pounds of weed

== See also ==
- List of Discovery Channel original programming
