= Marjorie Bransfield =

American actress

- Occupation: Actress
- Years active: 1986–1996
- Spouse: Jim Belushi (m. 1990; div. 1992)

Marjorie Bransfield is an American former actress.

She appeared in six films with onetime husband Jim Belushi (marked with an asterisk in the filmography), including a starring role in Abraxas, Guardian of the Universe. She had a small part in an episode of the TV series Murder One in 1996.

== Personal life ==
Bransfield married actor Jim Belushi in 1990, they divorced in 1992 after two years of marriage.

== Filmography ==
Year	Title	Role	Notes
1986	About Last Night...	Gloria	*
1988	Red Heat	Waitress	*
1989	K-9	Receptionist	*
1989	Homer and Eddie	Betsy	*
1989	Easy Wheels	Wendy	
1990	Taking Care of Business	Tennis Club Receptionist	*
1991	Ricochet	Secretary	
1991	Abraxas, Guardian of the Universe	Sonia Murray	Female Lead *
1996	Murder One	Kim	Episode: "Chapter Seventeen"
