= Thomas Yatsko =

American cinematographer and television director

- Other name: Tom Yatsko
- Occupations: Cinematographer, director
- Years active: 1987–present

Thomas Yatsko is an American cinematographer and television director, known for his work on television series like CSI: Miami, Brothers & Sisters, and Fringe.

== Career ==
In his capacity as a cinematographer, Yatsko has worked on the television series CSI: Miami, E-Ring, Alias, Brothers & Sisters, and Touch.

In late 2011 he signed with Global Artists Agency.

=== Fringe ===
Yatsko worked as director of photography on the FOX science-fiction Fringe, alternating episodes with cinematographer David Moxness. Yatsko has recently taken to directing several Fringe episodes, including "White Tulip", "6B", and "The Last Sam Weiss". The A.V. Club critic Noel Murray praised Yatsko's directional work for the series, explaining in his review of "6B" that Yatsko was "previously the director of the excellent 'White Tulip.' This wasn’t such a great episode, but Yatsko’s one to keep an eye on. His eps have a nice, burnished look, and I can’t complain about the performances either, which have struck me as very measured and connected." After the completion of the third season, Yatsko left the series.

== Filmography ==
=== Theatrical Films ===
Cinematographer

Year	Title	Director	Notes
2002	Roland	Charles Papert	—N/a
2008	Otis	Tony Krantz	—N/a
2009	Into the Blue 2: The Reef	Stephen Herek	—N/a
2013	The Call	Brad Anderson	—N/a
2014	Stonehearst Asylum	Brad Anderson	—N/a

=== Television ===
Cinematographer

Year	Title	Season	Episode Title	Episode No.	Notes
2003	CSI: Miami	2	"Dead Zone"	2	—N/a
2003	CSI: Miami	2	"Death Grip"	4	—N/a
2003	CSI: Miami	2	"The Best Defense"	5	—N/a
2003	CSI: Miami	2	"Hurricane Anthony"	6	—N/a
2003	CSI: Miami	2	"Big Brother"	8	—N/a
2003	CSI: Miami	2	"Extreme"	10	—N/a
2004	CSI: Miami	2	"Witness to Murder"	12	—N/a
2004	CSI: Miami	2	"Slow Burn"	14	—N/a
2004	CSI: Miami	2	"Stalkerazzi"	15	—N/a
2004	CSI: Miami	2	"Wannabe"	18	—N/a
2004	CSI: Miami	2	"The Oath"	20	—N/a
2004	CSI: Miami	2	"Rap Sheet"	22	—N/a
2004	CSI: Miami	2	"Innocent"	24	—N/a
2005	CSI: Miami	3	"Lost Son"	1	—N/a
2005	CSI: Miami	3	"Murder in a Flash"	4	—N/a
2005	CSI: Miami	3	"Legal"	5	—N/a
2005	CSI: Miami	3	"Speed Kills"	8	—N/a
2005	CSI: Miami	3	"Pirated"	9	—N/a
2005	CSI: Miami	3	"After the Fall"	10	—N/a
2005	CSI: Miami	3	"Shootout"	12	—N/a
2005	CSI: Miami	3	"Cop Killer"	13	—N/a
2005	CSI: Miami	3	"Nothing to Lose"	16	—N/a
2005	E-Ring	1	"Pilot"	1	—N/a
2005	E-Ring	1	"Weekend Pass"	2	—N/a
2006	Brothers & Sisters	1	"Patriarchy"	1	—N/a
2006	Brothers & Sisters	1	"An Act of Will"	2	—N/a
2006	Brothers & Sisters	1	"Affairs of State"	3	—N/a
2006	Brothers & Sisters	1	"Family Portrait"	4	—N/a
2006	Brothers & Sisters	1	"Date Night"	5	—N/a
2006	Brothers & Sisters	1	"For the Children"	6	—N/a
2006	Brothers & Sisters	1	"Northern Exposure"	7	—N/a
2006	Brothers & Sisters	1	"Mistakes Were Made: Part 1"	8	—N/a
2006	Brothers & Sisters	1	"Mistakes Were Made: Part 2"	9	—N/a
2007	Brothers & Sisters	1	"Family Day"	11	—N/a
2007	Brothers & Sisters	1	"Sexual Politics"	12	—N/a
2007	Brothers & Sisters	1	"Valentine's Day Massacre"	14	—N/a
2007	Brothers & Sisters	1	"All in the Family"	17	—N/a
2007	Brothers & Sisters	1	"Game Night"	19	—N/a
2007	Brothers & Sisters	1	"Bad News"	20	—N/a
2007	Brothers & Sisters	1	"Grapes of Wrath"	21	—N/a
2007	Brothers & Sisters	1	"Favorite Son"	22	—N/a
2007	Brothers & Sisters	1	"Matriarchy"	23	—N/a
2008	Fringe	1	"The Same Old Story"	2	—N/a
2008	Fringe	1	"The Ghost Network"	3	—N/a
2008	Fringe	1	"The Arrival"	4	—N/a
2008	Fringe	1	"Power Hungry"	5	—N/a
2008	Fringe	1	"The Cure"	6	—N/a
2008	Fringe	1	"In Which We Meet Mr. Jones"	7	—N/a
2008	Fringe	1	"The Equation"	8	—N/a
2008	Fringe	1	"The Dreamscape"	9	—N/a
2008	Fringe	1	"Safe"	10	—N/a
2009	Fringe	1	"Bound"	11	—N/a
2009	Fringe	1	"The No-Brainer"	12	—N/a
2009	Fringe	2	"A New Day in the Old Town"	1	—N/a
2009	Fringe	2	"Fracture"	3	—N/a
2009	Fringe	2	"Dream Logic"	5	—N/a
2009	Fringe	2	"Of Human Action"	7	—N/a
2009	Fringe	2	"Snakehead"	9	—N/a
2010	Fringe	2	"Johari Window"	12	—N/a
2010	Fringe	2	"The Bishop Revival"	14	—N/a
2010	Fringe	2	"Peter"	16	—N/a
2010	Fringe	2	"Brown Betty"	20	—N/a
2010	Fringe	2	"Over There: Part 1"	21	—N/a
2010	Fringe	2	"Over There: Part 2"	22	—N/a
2010	Fringe	3	"Olivia"	1	—N/a
2010	Fringe	3	"The Plateau"	3	—N/a
2011	Fringe	3	"Stowaway"	17	—N/a
2012	Touch	1	"Safety in Numbers"	3	—N/a
2012	Touch	1	"Kite Strings"	4	—N/a
2012	Touch	1	"Noosphere Rising"	7	—N/a
2012	Common Law	1	"Odd Couples"	9	—N/a
2012	Midnight Sun				Television film
2013	Bates Motel	1	"First You Dream, Then You Die"	1	—N/a
2013	Bates Motel	1	"Nice Town You Picked, Norma..."	2	—N/a
2013	Bates Motel	1	"What's Wrong with Norman"	3	—N/a
2013	Bates Motel	1	"Trust Me"	4	—N/a
2013	Bates Motel	1	"Ocean View"	5	—N/a
2013	Almost Human	1	"Pilot"	1	—N/a
2014	Almost Human	1	"Perception"	10	—N/a
2014	Almost Human	1	"Beholder"	12	—N/a
2014	Almost Human	1	"Straw Man"	13	—N/a
2014	Forever				
2023	Goosebumps				

Director

Year	Title	Season	Episode Title	Episode No.	Notes
2010	Fringe	2	"White Tulip"	18	—N/a
2011	Fringe	3	"6B"	14	—N/a
2011	Fringe	3	"The Last Sam Weiss"	21	—N/a
2014	Almost Human	1	"Disrupt"	11	—N/a
