= The Transformation =

- Fringe episode
- In the opening sequence, scientist Marshall Bowman transforms into a porcupine-like creature in an airplane bathroom
- Episode no.: Season 1 Episode 13
- Directed by: Brad Anderson
- Written by: Zack Whedon; J. R. Orci
- Production code: 3T7662
- Original air date: February 3, 2009

Guest appearances
- Neal Huff as Marshall Bowman; Felix Solis as Daniel Hicks; Armando Riesco as Gavin; Al Sapienza as Conrad Moreau; Ari Graynor as Rachel Dunham; Lily Pilblad as Ella Blake

Episode chronology
← Previous "The No-Brainer"	Next → "Ability"
- Fringe season 1

"The Transformation" is the thirteenth episode of the first season of the American science fiction drama television series Fringe. Its storyline centers on the circumstances surrounding a deceased scientist (Neal Huff), who was doped with a "designer virus" and transformed into a dangerous monster, causing his plane to crash. Fringe agent Olivia Dunham (Anna Torv) and FBI consultants Peter (Joshua Jackson) and Walter Bishop (John Noble) connect the event to an impending arms deal. Olivia must explore her mind for remaining memories of her former partner and lover, John Scott (Mark Valley), in order to prevent the sale of the virus.

The episode was co-written by Zack Whedon and supervising producer J. R. Orci, while producer Brad Anderson served as the director. The creation of the monster took the crew approximately eleven days—they took molds of guest actor Huff's head and back and created eight sets of dentures in order to create the special effect of transformation. To create the plane crash set, the crew spent over a week strategically placing around 15,000 pounds' worth of plane parts.

It was first screened at PaleyFest in November 2008. On February 3, 2009, the episode was broadcast in the United States on Fox to an estimated 12.78 million viewers. The episode earned a 5/6.5 ratings share among adults aged 18 to 49, finishing in eighth place for the week. It received generally positive reviews. Commentators have noted allusions to the pilot and a fourth-season episode, in addition to the television series Lost and H. G. Wells' novel The Island of Doctor Moreau.

== Plot ==
On an airplane in flight, scientist Marshall Bowman (Neal Huff) gets a nosebleed, and he tries to warn the crew to give him sedatives or use force against him. He locks himself in the lavatory before he transforms into a beast and bursts out, causing havoc in the plane and leading to a crash in Scarsdale, New York. The Fringe team arrives on the scene and discover the beast's body. Dr. Walter Bishop (John Noble) concludes that it started out as a human. Agent Olivia Dunham (Anna Torv) recognizes Bowman's picture from John Scott's (Mark Valley) memories, realizing that Bowman was flying to meet another man in the memories named Daniel Hicks (Felix Solis). Back at the lab at Harvard, Walter finds a small crystalline disc implanted in the beast's hand similar to one seen inside the woman killed in "The Ghost Network", and thinks Marshall was dosed with a "designer virus".

Hicks is brought in for questioning. After beginning to transform into a beast, he admits that "Conrad" dosed them before Peter Bishop (Joshua Jackson) pauses the process by administering a sedative and placing him in an induced coma. Walter develops an antidote, while Olivia finds another small disc in Hicks' hand. Her demand to see Scott's body leads her and Phillip Broyles (Lance Reddick) to Massive Dynamic, where Nina Sharp (Blair Brown) tells her that the information gleaned from Scott's body implicates him in a bioterrorist cell with the other two.

French intelligence states that weapons manufacturer Conrad is involved in a sale, leading to Olivia returning to the sensory deprivation tank in order to find out more from Scott's memories. In a motel room they used to share, Scott talks to Olivia, scaring her into shooting him. Olivia next appears in an alleyway, where she follows Scott into a memory of him almost killing Conrad. He reveals that he, Hicks, and Marshall are all undercover government agents for the NSA, and tells Olivia to ask Hicks where the meeting is going to happen. They awake Hicks, who tells them more about the weapons sale.

Being given details from a secret radio by Hicks, Olivia pretends to be the weapons buyer, and is accompanied by Peter. They successfully make contact, but the sellers become suspicious after Hicks' transformation restarts, depriving Olivia of the necessary information. Conrad makes his appearance and realizes Olivia and Peter are lying; just before he orders them killed, the FBI moves in and arrests the sellers.

The episode ends with Walter telling Olivia her brain waves are going back to normal, and that Scott's memories are fading from her mind. Olivia requests to enter the tank regardless, and she makes a last encounter with Scott, where he tells her he loved her and was going to marry her. She bids farewell to his consciousness, which has finally left her own.

== Production ==
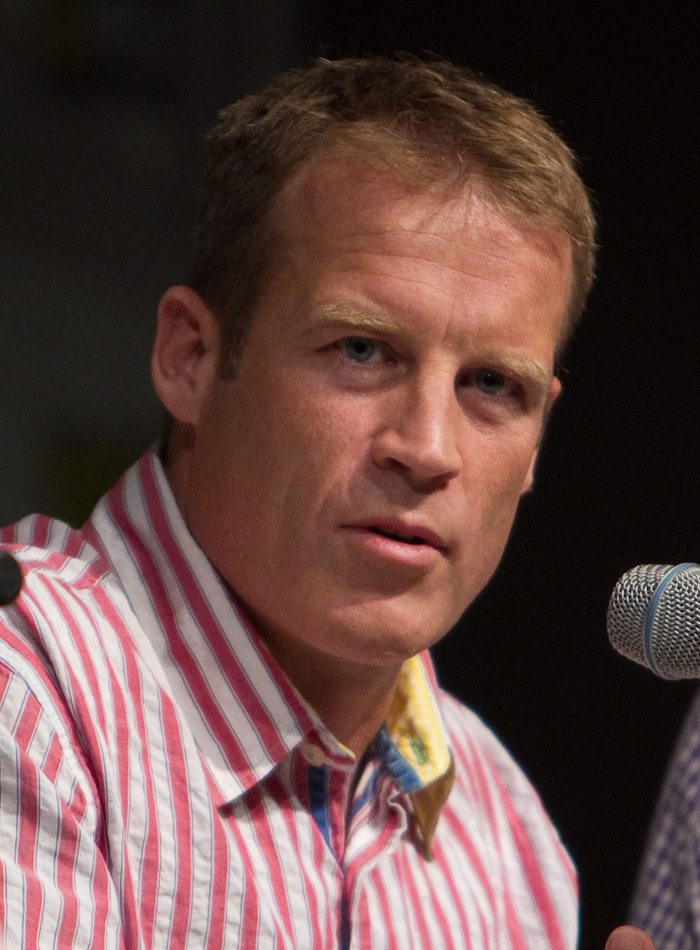
"The Transformation" resolved the storyline of John Scott, as played by Mark Valley (pictured).

"The Transformation" was co-written by Zack Whedon and supervising producer J. R. Orci. Whedon had last co-written the season's ninth episode, "The Dreamscape", while Orci helped write "The Equation", the season's eighth episode. Producer Brad Anderson served as director, his latest Fringe work since directing "In Which We Meet Mr. Jones" six episodes earlier. The episode resolved the John Scott storyline and featured the last appearance of actor Mark Valley. Media outlets speculated that because Valley and Torv married over the holiday break, his departure "would eliminate any chances of the marriage conflicting with the show." Co-creator Roberto Orci called Scott's final scene a "truly satisfactory conclusion to his story."

The creation of the monster took the series special effects crew approximately eleven days to implement. They created molds of guest actor Neal Huff's head and back, giving him "creature eye" contact lenses and covering the back foam mold with "backbarbs". Eight different dentures were made of Huff's mouth to depict the character gradually losing his teeth, "anything from simple teeth that match his own..., to wiggling teeth that he can start to loosen up, to ones where he's already started to lose a tooth," explained Special Effects Makeup crewman Stephen Kelley. Each denture appliance took about a day to create. The final version of the creature, Kelley noted, was "very exaggerated... He's got the big giant quills coming off it like a porcupine. And it's also got six nipples on it, which is part of us trying to investigate what this creature actually it is."

Andrew Orloff, the creative director and visual effects supervisor of Zoic Studios, considered the creature one of the most challenging effects his company helped make for the season. He explained that this and other designed monsters are "really super fantastical, they're really out there, the anatomy and the biology of them is so wild and crazy, that it really takes a lot to make it look real in the scene and make it a part of the actors are reacting to these things—to get the audience to believe in it is kind of the biggest challenge we've faced on the show so far." During filming, the cast and crew referred to the monster as a "were-upine" or "porcuman". Lance Reddick commented on set, "When I first got here tonight, I was expecting zombies to come up out of the ground. And the actual creature looks so bizarre, I mean it really looks like something I wouldn't want to be caught in the woods with." The crew spent over a week collecting and placing the plane wreckage together. According to Set Dresser Russ Griffin, the set included approximately 15,000 pounds' worth of plane parts.

Though the episode first aired in February 2009, "The Transformation" had an early screening at the November 2008 PaleyFest, where Fringe's producers answered questions from the audience. When asked in an interview if the "giant germ" from "Bound" was the grossest thing of the season, executive producer Jeff Pinkner replied that "the huge porcupine man on the airplane [from "The Transformation"] was more shocking. It was so unexpected." At the time "The Transformation" aired, Joshua Jackson considered it the series' best episode. John Noble called it "grotesque" and "possibly one of the more gruesome ones we've done."

== Analysis and legacy ==
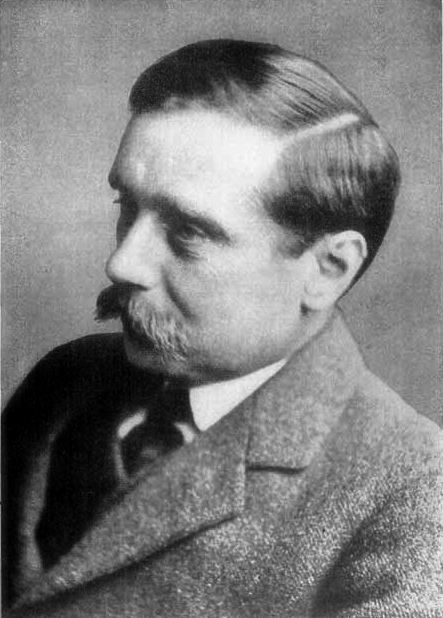
Allusions to The Island of Doctor Moreau, authored by H. G. Wells (pictured), have been perceived in the episode.

In her 2011 book Into the Looking Glass: Exploring the Worlds of Fringe, author Sarah Clarke Stuart observed that two unrelated Fringe characters, Conrad Moreau of "The Transformation" and Moreau (Brad Dourif) of "The Day We Died", are allusions to H. G. Wells' 1896 novel The Island of Doctor Moreau. Both are "scientifically inspired men with questionable integrity," while Wells' Doctor Moreau is an "unethical researcher" who fell "under the overmastering spell of research," in a vein similar to Walter.

Like the pilot episode, "The Transformation" begins on the passenger section of an airplane in flight. Actor Mark Valley was asked how the episode differed from the pilot, leading him to joke that "it's a completely different airline this time." His character, John Scott, was first seen in an episode about a plane disaster; accordingly, IGN expressed, it made sense thematically to have his last appearance be in an episode about a similar type of disaster. The Los Angeles Times viewed the flight number of 718 and its subsequent crash as a nod to co-creator J. J. Abrams' other series, Lost.

The episode also had an influence on the series' fourth season, which featured parallel stories to those that occurred in earlier episodes. The season's sixteenth episode, "Nothing As It Seems", centers around the "designer virus" that had caused Marshall Bowman to transform, but this time he does so in the airport after his plane has safely landed. Peter recognizes the case from his own timeline, as seen in the events of "The Transformation", and helps the Fringe team locate Daniel Hicks.

== Reception ==
=== Ratings ===
"The Transformation" first aired on February 3, 2009 in the United States, and was watched by an estimated 12.78 million viewers. The episode earned a 5/6.5 ratings share among viewers aged 18–49, meaning that it was seen by 5.0 percent of all 18- to 49-year-olds, and 6.5 percent of all 18- to 49-year-olds watching television at the time of broadcast. This rating meant it ranked eighth for the week among all the major networks. Sarah Stegall of SFScope attributed this ratings success to its lead-in show, the highly rated American Idol, and observed that "with episodes like this one, mixing action, horror, and a few tender moments, it looks like Fringe is hitting its stride with viewers."

=== Reviews ===
"The Transformation" received generally positive reviews. Andrew Hanson from the Los Angeles Times gave the episode a positive review, opining that it "hit the perfect tone for Fringe [and had] the right mixture of science fiction, dark comedy, crime story and melodrama". Hanson was, however, disappointed with the closure of the Olivia–John Scott storyline, as he hoped that "she doesn't carry this torch too long" because he preferred the "flirty" Olivia. Ramsey Isler of IGN gave the episode 9.0/10, an indication of an "amazing" installment. He was pleased with the absence of Sanford Harris and enjoyed the "brilliantly written and directed" undercover sting operation, particularly because Peter was properly utilized as Olivia's "wingman." Isler also criticized the monster's special effects and believed there were still unanswered questions concerning Scott's storyline.

Writing for The A.V. Club, Noel Murray thought it was the best "freak-meet" of the series thus far, as well as one of its best episodes, which he would "eagerly show to Fringe-doubters as evidence that the series has found its legs." He consequently graded the episode an A−, further attributing the success of the episode to "top-tier" writers Orci and Whedon and "skilled" director Brad Anderson. Murray wrote, "I wouldn't say that 'The Transformation' broke any new ground. If anything, it recapitulated pretty much every previous Fringe element—bio-weapons sales, telepathic communication, Massive Dynamics, [sic] airplane crashes, etc.—but did so in a way that was energetic, tense, and even a little emotional." SFScope columnist Sarah Stegall had difficulty "suspend[ing her] disbelief" with the science behind Bowman's rapid transformation. Though she thought it was "sweet" that Scott's proposal "echo[ed] the real-life recent marriage between Anna Torv and Mark Valley," Stegall was pleased that the series could now move onto another storyline.
