= Safe (Fringe) =

- Fringe episode
- Walter investigates the episode's case, which involves a man caught inside a wall while robbing a bank.
- Episode no.: Season 1 Episode 10
- Directed by: Michael Zinberg
- Written by: David H. Goodman; Jason Cahill
- Production code: 3T7659
- Original air date: December 2, 2008

Guest appearances
- Chance Kelly as Mitchell Loeb; James Frain as Salman Kohl; Jared Harris as David Robert Jones; Paul Fitzgerald as Ryan Eastwick; Angel David as Raul Lugo; Vince Cupone as Evan McNeil; Brian Cromwell as Robert Norton; Rosa Arredondo as Susan Lugo; Amir Arison as Dr. Burce Miler; Michael Cerveris as the Observer

Episode chronology
← Previous "The Dreamscape"	Next → "Bound"
- Fringe season 1

"Safe" is the tenth episode of the first season of the American science fiction drama television series Fringe. It begins when a group uses technology to walk through a bank's wall and steal a safe deposit box. Its contents contain special equipment meant to ultimately break David Robert Jones (Jared Harris) out of his Frankfurt jail.

The episode was written by co-executive producer David H. Goodman and executive producer Jason Cahill, and was directed by Michael Zinberg. "Safe" featured guest starring performances from Harris, Chance Kelly (as Mitchell Loeb), James Frain (as Salman Kohl), and Michael Cerveris (as the Observer).

The episode first aired in the United States on December 2, 2008 on the Fox network. An estimated 8.54 million viewers watched "Safe", making it Fox's fourth most watched show of the week. It premiered to mostly positive reviews, with some believing it improved the entire season by providing more meaning to previous episode mysteries. IGN ranked it as the seventh best episode of the entire series in 2013.

== Plot ==
At Philadelphia Mutual Savings Bank, a group of men led by Agent Mitchell Loeb break in and use a machine that makes it possible to walk through the bank's wall. Several men pass through the wall and steal a safe deposit box numbered 610. One of the men is unable to make it back through, however, before the wall solidifies again, and he is left stuck inside the wall; Loeb shoots him in the head to prevent him from talking, and they leave.

Olivia Dunham (Anna Torv), Agent Broyles (Lance Reddick), Peter Bishop (Joshua Jackson), and Dr. Walter Bishop (John Noble) arrive to investigate, and Broyles says this is the third robbery where a large safe deposit box has been taken. Olivia says she recognizes the victim as Raul Lugo from their time in the Marines together. Peter and Walter go to a local hardware store and buy an electric saw to cut the man out of the wall.

Meanwhile in Frankfurt, imprisoned biochemist David Robert Jones is visited by his lawyer Mr. Kohl (James Frain), who tells Jones that the job in Philadelphia was successful. Jones tells Kohl to wire Loeb another $100,000, and he makes a list of items he needs Kohl to bring on his next visit. Olivia visits Raul's wife Susan Lugo (Rosa Arredondo) and claims to have met her before as well, but Susan does not remember their meeting. She says the only people at a meeting Olivia describes were Raul, Susan, and John Scott (Mark Valley). Olivia realizes that she apparently still has his memories inside of her head, and is mixing them up with her own. Over at Massive Dynamic, Nina Sharp's (Blair Brown) attempts to delve into Scott's memories for information hit a dead end when they find out that crucial pieces of his memories are missing; they soon discover that the memories they need are in Olivia's mind.

The boxes are found to have been bought with bogus names and cash 23 years ago. Raul's amputated forearm is examined and discovered to be radioactive, leading Walter to conclude these are after effects of using the technology to pass through walls. Olivia and Peter go to a bar to find out information about Raul from one of his old friends, who says Raul has spent much of his time at the VA. While there, Peter realizes the numbers of the stolen safe deposit boxes match numbers Walter continually spouts off at night. When they confront him, Walter says it is the Fibonacci sequence, and he then realizes that the safe deposit boxes are his. Walter tries to remember what he put in the boxes and where the next two are. Meanwhile, Broyles discovers the VA that Raul went to was in Washington, D.C., leading Olivia to find out Raul and three other patients were in a chess club together. The FBI discovers these men bought a plane ticket to Providence, and Walter remembers which bank he would've used to store something. But when Olivia and Charlie arrive at the bank, the safe deposit box has already been stolen. When they are fleeing, Olivia is able to wound and capture one of the men.

Kohl arrives with Jones' requested items and is told to come the following morning with some paperwork. Jones also asks Kohl for one more thing: Olivia. Peter insists on interrogating the wounded man himself and tells him he has radiation poisoning. The man breaks down and says he was hired freelance but does not know his boss's name. He says all he knows is that his crew is going to a field in Westford, and Olivia figures out it is Little Hill, a word previously given to Jones. Walter remembers the machine he built that is hidden in the safe deposit boxes is able to "retrieve anyone from anywhere". Loeb and his remaining team begin setting up at Little Hill, while Jones kills Kohl in Frankfurt. Jones puts on Kohl's suit and is seen preparing for something by putting on suntan lotion and eye drops. While the FBI converge on Little Hill, Olivia is attacked and captured en route by Loeb's forces. Jones is successfully teleported from Frankfurt to Little Hill.

== Production ==
"Safe" was written by co-executive producer David H. Goodman and consulting producer Jason Cahill, while Michael Zinberg served as the episode's director. It was Goodman's third contribution to the series and Cahill's second. It was the only Fringe episode by Zinberg, a prolific television director who has directed over eighty other television series. Along with "The Equation", "Safe" resolved much of the storyline surrounding Mitchell Loeb (played by guest actor Chance Kelly), as it addressed how Loeb's team desired to use the equation. The episode featured guest stars James Frain as Salman Kohl, Jared Harris as David Robert Jones, and Michael Cerveris as the Observer.

During the first half of its first season, Fringe staff and critics noted that the series was still trying to define itself and its characters. The writers worked on balancing serialized storytelling with standalone plots and had to contend with continuous rewrites and expensive last-minute reshoots. For them, "Safe" marked a turning point in the series. They turned David Robert Jones into a recurring character and began to give Olivia more of a personal life. Actor Lance Reddick, who portrays Agent Broyles, later explained in an interview how important the episode was to the evolution of the series, "We found who we were in episode 10, the episode where Olivia got kidnapped... We were trying to hedge our bets and trying to be too many kinds of shows at once. I'm not saying we got rid of the procedural element because each episode still is on a case – a case in terms of the quote-unquote police work — but it's not formulaic, not like the early episodes. What keeps the show most watchable is the fact that it is character-based."

== Reception ==
=== Ratings ===
"Safe" first broadcast in the United States on December 2, 2008. It was watched by an estimated 8.54 million viewers, making it the Fox network's fourth most watched show of the week. The episode garnered a 5.3/8 household ratings share and a 3.6/9 among adults aged 18 to 49, meaning that it was seen by 3.6 percent of all 18- to 49-year-olds, and 9 percent of all 18- to 49-year-olds watching television at the time of broadcast. It was the last Fringe episode of 2008 and it began the mid-season break, as the next episode, "Bound", aired in January.

=== Reviews ===
Travis Fickett of IGN gave the episode 9.5/10, writing "This wasn't just a good episode – it was great. It capitalized on absolutely every scrap of promise the show has had in its first nine episodes. Tell your friends and neighbors, they're probably going to want to tune in when this returns after the break. Not only that, but this episode heightens and improves every episode that has come before – as now all the pieces are important". Total Sci-Fi Online rated the episode 7/10, and expressed the wish that "Safe" could have been used as the series' pilot. "The central premise has more pull, it draws together various plot strands going back to the pilot, meaningfully involves several seemingly incidental characters and events from the past, and zips along at a better pace. It’s a shame it took this long to reach this part of the puzzle, where a few of the pieces at last click satisfyingly into place". Erin Dougherty of CinemaBlend thought the episode "was actually well thought out, well written, and not confusing at all. Plus, the characters seemed to be complete. Now, all the brains behind this could-be great show have to do is keep it up".

"Overnight, this show went from ho-hum TV for me, to must-watch TV. I am only unhappy that we have to wait until January for more episodes."

— SFScope writer Sarah Stegall

The A.V. Club's Zach Handlen graded the episode with an A−, praising the opening as "quite good" and believing the tie between Walter and his past research "changes the game" ("Having Walter be, in a way, the source of the current disturbance suddenly made everything that much more important"). Jane Boursaw of TV Squad liked the revelation about Walter's safe deposit boxes, but questioned Olivia's logic to get out of her SUV when fleeing her kidnappers. SFScope's Sarah Stegall exclaimed, "Now this is science fiction! I was absolutely thrilled by this week's episode". She elaborated by praising Olivia's "B story" about her and John Scott's memories, the series' use of "cold-blooded" villains, and believed "the elements of the show are finally achieving some balance." Writing for the Los Angeles Times, critic Andrew Hanson noted "Wow. Fringe brings its first chapter to a close, and it really does feel like the end of a chapter. What started as the 'wacky science project of the week' builds to an episode that feels like a mini season finale."

Television Without Pity gave the episode an A, while website blogger io9 highlighted "Safe" as one of the "crucial" episodes new viewers must watch to get into the show. Jeff Jensen of Entertainment Weekly named "Safe" the eighth best episode of the series, explaining that it "centered on a character that might be Fringe's most memorable villain, the charismatic mastermind David Robert Jones, played by Mad Men's Jared Harris. His second appearance — built around a clever jail break involving teleportation — made for a riveting and much-needed outing, as it landed right at a time when many critics and viewers were beginning to doubt." IGN found the episode to be the seventh best of the series, noting it as a turning point for the show.
