= List of Fringe episodes =

Fringe is an American science fiction television series that originally aired on the Fox network from September 9, 2008, to January 18, 2013. The series follows the Fringe Team as it investigates bizarre scientific occurrences related to "The Pattern", a string of freak, fringe science–related incidents worldwide. The team consists of FBI special agent Olivia Dunham (Anna Torv), eccentric scientist Walter Bishop (John Noble) and his genius son Peter Bishop (Joshua Jackson), as well as others at the FBI and the Department of Homeland Security. The series' narrative evolves and it later centers on a parallel universe and then on the mysterious Observers – a group of expressionless, pale, bald men in suits who have appeared throughout documented human history at significant historical events.

Fringe was created by J. J. Abrams, Alex Kurtzman, and Roberto Orci. They took inspiration from multiple sources including the works of Michael Crichton and David Cronenberg, the film Altered States, and the television series The X-Files and The Twilight Zone. The three also sought to combine elements of procedural shows like Law & Order with an "extremely serialized and very culty" series like Lost, which Abrams co-created. Fringe's pilot episode was picked up by Fox in May 2008, and premiered on September 9. Critics hailed the series as a successor to Lost, as the two shared many similarities including Abrams' involvement, characters exploring a series of unexplained events, the use of many of the same actors and writers, and the difficulty in categorizing each show within just one genre. Explored themes in Fringe include free will, the potential benefits and risks of emerging technologies, the nature of time, and the differences that separate faith and reason.

The series was broadcast across five seasons and 100 episodes. Its first season included 20 episodes, while its second contained 23 installments, though one of these, "Unearthed", was filmed during the first season. The third and fourth seasons contained 22 episodes, while the fifth featured thirteen installments. Fringe's ratings started strongly with a weekly episode average of 8.8 million, achieving first place in the 18–49 adult demographic among the 2008–09 television season's new shows. In addition to these solid ratings, the first season garnered a generally favorable critical reception. Later seasons gradually suffered a decrease in ratings—the series finale being watched by just 3.2 million viewers—though the series did develop a cult following. Entertainment Weekly conjectures that despite its ratings decline, Fringe survived for five seasons in part because of Fox executive Kevin Reilly's love of the series, and also due to the network's desire to make amends for the science fiction shows it had previously canceled.

Across its run the series earned many accolades, though it failed to win major awards. At the Television Critics Awards, Fringe earned a 2009 award that designated it "Outstanding New Program of the Year". Fringe won seven Saturn Awards among fifteen nominations; from 2009–11, Torv won for Best Actress on Television, while Noble won for Best Supporting Actor on Television in 2010. Noble won a similar award at the 2011 Critics' Choice Television Awards, where the series and Torv also received nominations. Additionally, the series received nominations for two Primetime Creative Arts Emmy Awards, eight Golden Reel Awards, two Satellite Awards, and two Writers Guild of America Awards.

== Series overview ==
Season	Episodes	Originally released		Average viewership (in millions)
Season	Episodes	First released	Last released	Average viewership (in millions)
1	20	September 9, 2008	May 12, 2009	10.02
2	23	September 17, 2009	May 20, 2010	6.25
3	22	September 23, 2010	May 6, 2011	5.83
4	22	September 23, 2011	May 11, 2012	4.22
5	13	September 28, 2012	January 18, 2013	4.27

== Episodes ==
=== Season 1 (2008–09) ===
No. overall	No. in season	Title	Directed by	Written by	Original release date	Prod. code	US viewers (millions)
1	1	"Pilot"	Alex Graves	J. J. Abrams & Alex Kurtzman & Roberto Orci	September 9, 2008	276038	9.13
2	2	"The Same Old Story"	Paul Edwards	Jeff Pinkner & J. J. Abrams & Alex Kurtzman & Roberto Orci	September 16, 2008	3T7651	13.27
3	3	"The Ghost Network"	Frederick E. O. Toye	David H. Goodman & J. R. Orci	September 23, 2008	3T7652	9.42
4	4	"The Arrival"	Paul Edwards	J. J. Abrams & Jeff Pinkner	September 30, 2008	3T7653	9.91
5	5	"Power Hungry"	Christopher Misiano	Jason Cahill & Julia Cho	October 14, 2008	3T7654	9.16
6	6	"The Cure"	Bill Eagles	Felicia D. Henderson & Brad Caleb Kane	October 21, 2008	3T7655	8.91
7	7	"In Which We Meet Mr. Jones"	Brad Anderson	J. J. Abrams & Jeff Pinkner	November 11, 2008	3T7656	8.61
8	8	"The Equation"	Gwyneth Horder-Payton	J. R. Orci & David H. Goodman	November 18, 2008	3T7657	9.18
9	9	"The Dreamscape"	Frederick E. O. Toye	Zack Whedon & Julia Cho	November 25, 2008	3T7658	7.70
10	10	"Safe"	Michael Zinberg	David H. Goodman & Jason Cahill	December 2, 2008	3T7659	8.54
11	11	"Bound"	Frederick E. O. Toye	J. J. Abrams & Jeff Pinkner & Alex Kurtzman & Roberto Orci	January 20, 2009	3T7660	11.96
12	12	"The No-Brainer"	John Polson	David H. Goodman & Brad Caleb Kane	January 27, 2009	3T7661	11.62
13	13	"The Transformation"	Brad Anderson	Zack Whedon & J. R. Orci	February 3, 2009	3T7662	12.78
14	14	"Ability"	Norberto Barba	Story by : Glen Whitman & Robert Chiappetta; Teleplay by : David H. Goodman	February 10, 2009	3T7663	9.83
15	15	"Inner Child"	Frederick E. O. Toye	Brad Caleb Kane & Julia Cho	April 7, 2009	3T7664	9.88
16	16	"Unleashed"	Brad Anderson	Zack Whedon & J. R. Orci	April 14, 2009	3T7665	10.15
17	17	"Bad Dreams"	Akiva Goldsman	Akiva Goldsman	April 21, 2009	3T7666	9.89
18	18	"Midnight"	Bobby Roth	J. H. Wyman & Andrew Kreisberg	April 28, 2009	3T7667	9.62
19	19	"The Road Not Taken"	Frederick E. O. Toye	Story by : Akiva Goldsman; Teleplay by : Jeff Pinkner & J. R. Orci	May 5, 2009	3T7668	9.25
20	20	"There's More Than One of Everything"	Brad Anderson	Story by : Akiva Goldsman & Bryan Burk; Teleplay by : Jeff Pinkner & J. H. Wyman	May 12, 2009	3T7669	9.28

=== Season 2 (2009–10) ===
No. overall	No. in season	Title	Directed by	Written by	Original release date	Prod. code	US viewers (millions)
21	1	"A New Day in the Old Town"	Akiva Goldsman	J. J. Abrams & Akiva Goldsman	September 17, 2009	3X5101	7.82
22	2	"Night of Desirable Objects"	Brad Anderson	Jeff Pinkner & J. H. Wyman	September 24, 2009	3X5102	5.73
23	3	"Fracture"	Bryan Spicer	David Wilcox	October 1, 2009	3X5103	6.03
24	4	"Momentum Deferred"	Joe Chappelle	Zack Stentz & Ashley Edward Miller	October 8, 2009	3X5104	5.83
25	5	"Dream Logic"	Paul Edwards	Josh Singer	October 15, 2009	3X5105	5.78
26	6	"Earthling"	Jon Cassar	J. H. Wyman & Jeff Vlaming	November 5, 2009	3X5106	4.86
27	7	"Of Human Action"	Joe Chappelle	Robert Chiappetta & Glen Whitman	November 12, 2009	3X5107	5.91
28	8	"August"	Dennis Smith	J. H. Wyman & Jeff Pinkner	November 19, 2009	3X5108	5.90
29	9	"Snakehead"	Paul Holahan	David Wilcox	December 3, 2009	3X5109	6.94
30	10	"Grey Matters"	Jeannot Szwarc	Ashley Edward Miller & Zack Stentz	December 10, 2009	3X5110	6.32
31	11	"Unearthed"	Frederick E. O. Toye	David H. Goodman & Andrew Kreisberg	January 11, 2010	3T7670	7.72
32	12	"Johari Window"	Joe Chappelle	Josh Singer	January 14, 2010	3X5111	6.60
33	13	"What Lies Below"	Deran Sarafian	Jeff Vlaming	January 21, 2010	3X5112	6.90
34	14	"The Bishop Revival"	Adam Davidson	Glen Whitman & Robert Chiappetta	January 28, 2010	3X5113	8.90
35	15	"Jacksonville"	Charles Beeson	Ashley Edward Miller & Zack Stentz	February 4, 2010	3X5114	7.40
36	16	"Peter"	David Straiton	Story by : J. H. Wyman & Jeff Pinkner & Akiva Goldsman & Josh Singer; Teleplay by : Jeff Pinkner & J. H. Wyman & Josh Singer	April 1, 2010	3X5115	5.97
37	17	"Olivia. In the Lab. With the Revolver."	Brad Anderson	Matthew Pitts	April 8, 2010	3X5116	6.33
38	18	"White Tulip"	Thomas Yatsko	J. H. Wyman & Jeff Vlaming	April 15, 2010	3X5117	6.62
39	19	"The Man from the Other Side"	Jeffrey Hunt	Josh Singer & Ethan Gross	April 22, 2010	3X5118	5.84
40	20	"Brown Betty"	Seith Mann	Jeff Pinkner & J. H. Wyman & Akiva Goldsman	April 29, 2010	3X5119	5.55
41	21	"Northwest Passage"	Joe Chappelle	Ashley Edward Miller & Zack Stentz & Nora Zuckerman & Lilla Zuckerman	May 6, 2010	3X5120	5.82
42	22	"Over There (Part 1)"	Akiva Goldsman	J. H. Wyman & Jeff Pinkner & Akiva Goldsman	May 13, 2010	3X5121	6.00
43	23	"Over There (Part 2)"	Akiva Goldsman	Jeff Pinkner & J. H. Wyman & Akiva Goldsman	May 20, 2010	3X5122	5.68

=== Season 3 (2010–11) ===
No. overall	No. in season	Title	Directed by	Written by	Original release date	Prod. code	US viewers (millions)
44	1	"Olivia"	Joe Chappelle	J. H. Wyman & Jeff Pinkner	September 23, 2010	3X6101	5.83
45	2	"The Box"	Jeffrey Hunt	Josh Singer & Graham Roland	September 30, 2010	3X6102	5.24
46	3	"The Plateau"	Brad Anderson	Alison Schapker & Monica Owusu-Breen	October 7, 2010	3X6103	5.19
47	4	"Do Shapeshifters Dream of Electric Sheep?"	Ken Fink	David Wilcox & Matthew Pitts	October 14, 2010	3X6104	5.22
48	5	"Amber 31422"	David Straiton	Josh Singer & Ethan Gross	November 4, 2010	3X6105	4.80
49	6	"6955 kHz"	Joe Chappelle	Robert Chiappetta & Glen Whitman	November 11, 2010	3X6106	4.82
50	7	"The Abducted"	Chuck Russell	David Wilcox & Graham Roland	November 18, 2010	3X6107	4.85
51	8	"Entrada"	Brad Anderson	Jeff Pinkner & J. H. Wyman	December 2, 2010	3X6108	5.13
52	9	"Marionette"	Joe Chappelle	Monica Owusu-Breen & Alison Schapker	December 9, 2010	3X6109	4.74
53	10	"The Firefly"	Charles Beeson	J. H. Wyman & Jeff Pinkner	January 21, 2011	3X6110	4.87
54	11	"Reciprocity"	Jeannot Szwarc	Josh Singer	January 28, 2011	3X6111	4.53
55	12	"Concentrate and Ask Again"	Dennis Smith	Graham Roland & Matthew Pitts	February 4, 2011	3X6112	4.26
56	13	"Immortality"	Brad Anderson	David Wilcox & Ethan Gross	February 11, 2011	3X6113	3.74
57	14	"6B"	Thomas Yatsko	Glen Whitman & Robert Chiappetta	February 18, 2011	3X6114	4.02
58	15	"Subject 13"	Frederick E. O. Toye	Jeff Pinkner & J. H. Wyman & Akiva Goldsman	February 25, 2011	3X6115	4.02
59	16	"Os"	Brad Anderson	Josh Singer & Graham Roland	March 11, 2011	3X6116	3.64
60	17	"Stowaway"	Charles Beeson	Story by : J. H. Wyman & Jeff Pinkner & Akiva Goldsman; Teleplay by : Danielle Dispaltro	March 18, 2011	3X6117	3.80
61	18	"Bloodline"	Dennis Smith	Alison Schapker & Monica Owusu-Breen	March 25, 2011	3X6118	3.84
62	19	"Lysergic Acid Diethylamide"	Joe Chappelle	Story by : Jeff Pinkner & J. H. Wyman & Akiva Goldsman; Teleplay by : J. H. Wyman & Jeff Pinkner	April 15, 2011	3X6119	3.65
63	20	"6:02 AM EST"	Jeannot Szwarc	David Wilcox & Josh Singer & Graham Roland	April 22, 2011	3X6120	3.33
64	21	"The Last Sam Weiss"	Thomas Yatsko	Monica Owusu-Breen & Alison Schapker	April 29, 2011	3X6121	3.52
65	22	"The Day We Died"	Joe Chappelle	Story by : Akiva Goldsman & J. H. Wyman & Jeff Pinkner; Teleplay by : Jeff Pinkner & J. H. Wyman	May 6, 2011	3X6122	3.29

=== Season 4 (2011–12) ===
No. overall	No. in season	Title	Directed by	Written by	Original release date	Prod. code	US viewers (millions)
66	1	"Neither Here Nor There"	Joe Chappelle	Story by : Jeff Pinkner & J. H. Wyman & Akiva Goldsman; Teleplay by : J. H. Wyman & Jeff Pinkner	September 23, 2011	3X7001	3.48
67	2	"One Night in October"	Brad Anderson	Alison Schapker & Monica Owusu-Breen	September 30, 2011	3X7002	3.05
68	3	"Alone in the World"	Miguel Sapochnik	David Fury	October 7, 2011	3X7003	3.18
69	4	"Subject 9"	Joe Chappelle	Jeff Pinkner & J. H. Wyman & Akiva Goldsman	October 14, 2011	3X7004	3.16
70	5	"Novation"	Paul Holahan	J. R. Orci & Graham Roland	November 4, 2011	3X7005	3.21
71	6	"And Those We've Left Behind"	Brad Anderson	Robert Chiappetta & Glen Whitman	November 11, 2011	3X7006	3.03
72	7	"Wallflower"	Anthony Hemingway	Matthew Pitts & Justin Doble	November 18, 2011	3X7007	2.88
73	8	"Back to Where You've Never Been"	Jeannot Szwarc	David Fury & Graham Roland	January 13, 2012	3X7008	2.87
74	9	"Enemy of My Enemy"	Joe Chappelle	Monica Owusu-Breen & Alison Schapker	January 20, 2012	3X7009	3.19
75	10	"Forced Perspective"	David Solomon	Ethan Gross	January 27, 2012	3X7010	3.33
76	11	"Making Angels"	Charles Beeson	Akiva Goldsman & J. H. Wyman & Jeff Pinkner	February 3, 2012	3X7011	3.20
77	12	"Welcome to Westfield"	David Straiton	J. R. Orci & Graham Roland	February 10, 2012	3X7012	3.05
78	13	"A Better Human Being"	Joe Chappelle	Story by : Glen Whitman & Robert Chiappetta; Teleplay by : Alison Schapker & Monica Owusu-Breen	February 17, 2012	3X7013	3.00
79	14	"The End of All Things"	Jeff Hunt	David Fury	February 24, 2012	3X7014	3.08
80	15	"A Short Story About Love"	J. H. Wyman	J. H. Wyman & Graham Roland	March 23, 2012	3X7015	2.87
81	16	"Nothing As It Seems"	Frederick E. O. Toye	Jeff Pinkner & Akiva Goldsman	March 30, 2012	3X7016	3.08
82	17	"Everything in Its Right Place"	David Moxness	Story by : J. R. Orci & Matthew Pitts; Teleplay by : David Fury & J. R. Orci	April 6, 2012	3X7017	3.01
83	18	"The Consultant"	Jeannot Szwarc	Christine Lavaf	April 13, 2012	3X7018	2.84
84	19	"Letters of Transit"	Joe Chappelle	Akiva Goldsman & J. H. Wyman & Jeff Pinkner	April 20, 2012	3X7019	3.03
85	20	"Worlds Apart"	Charles Beeson	Story by : Graham Roland; Teleplay by : Matthew Pitts & Nicole Phillips	April 27, 2012	3X7020	3.09
86	21	"Brave New World (Part 1)"	Joe Chappelle	J. H. Wyman & Jeff Pinkner & Akiva Goldsman	May 4, 2012	3X7021	2.73
87	22	"Brave New World (Part 2)"	Joe Chappelle	Jeff Pinkner & J. H. Wyman & Akiva Goldsman	May 11, 2012	3X7022	3.11

=== Season 5 (2012–13) ===
No. overall	No. in season	Title	Directed by	Written by	Original release date	Prod. code	US viewers (millions)
88	1	"Transilience Thought Unifier Model-11"	Jeannot Szwarc; Miguel Sapochnik	J. H. Wyman	September 28, 2012	3X7501	3.12
89	2	"In Absentia"	Jeannot Szwarc	J. H. Wyman & David Fury	October 5, 2012	3X7502	2.98
90	3	"The Recordist"	Jeff T. Thomas	Graham Roland	October 12, 2012	3X7503	2.64
91	4	"The Bullet That Saved the World"	David Straiton	Alison Schapker	October 26, 2012	3X7504	2.55
92	5	"An Origin Story"	P. J. Pesce	J. H. Wyman	November 2, 2012	3X7505	2.58
93	6	"Through the Looking Glass and What Walter Found There"	Jon Cassar	David Fury	November 9, 2012	3X7506	2.47
94	7	"Five-Twenty-Ten"	Eagle Egilsson	Graham Roland	November 16, 2012	3X7507	2.70
95	8	"The Human Kind"	Dennis Smith	Alison Schapker	December 7, 2012	3X7508	2.71
96	9	"Black Blotter"	Tommy Gormley	Kristin Cantrell	December 14, 2012	3X7509	3.12
97	10	"Anomaly XB-6783746"	Jeffrey Hunt	David Fury	December 21, 2012	3X7510	3.02
98	11	"The Boy Must Live"	Paul Holahan	Graham Roland	January 11, 2013	3X7511	2.44
99	12	"Liberty"	P. J. Pesce	Alison Schapker	January 18, 2013	3X7512	3.28
100	13	"An Enemy of Fate"	J. H. Wyman	J. H. Wyman	January 18, 2013	3X7513	3.28

== Ratings ==
Fringe : U.S. viewers per episode (millions)

Season	Episode number																						
Season	1	2	3	4	5	6	7	8	9	10	11	12	13	14	15	16	17	18	19	20	21	22	23
1	9.13	13.27	9.42	9.91	9.16	8.91	8.61	9.18	7.70	8.54	11.96	11.62	12.78	9.83	9.88	10.15	9.89	9.62	9.25	9.28	–		
2	7.82	5.73	6.03	5.83	5.78	4.86	5.91	5.90	6.94	6.32	7.72	6.60	6.90	8.90	7.40	5.97	6.33	6.62	5.84	5.55	5.82	6.00	5.68
3	5.93	5.24	5.19	5.22	4.80	4.82	4.85	5.13	4.74	4.87	4.53	4.26	3.74	4.02	4.02	3.64	3.80	3.84	3.65	3.33	3.52	3.29	–
4	3.48	3.05	3.18	3.16	3.21	3.03	2.88	2.87	3.19	3.33	3.20	3.05	3.00	3.08	2.87	3.08	3.01	2.84	3.03	3.09	2.73	3.11	–
5	3.12	2.98	2.64	2.55	2.58	2.47	2.70	2.71	3.12	3.02	2.44	3.28	3.28	–									

Audience measurement performed by Nielsen Media Research
