= White Tulip =

- Fringe episode
- Scientist Alistair Peck (Peter Weller) has transformed his body into a personal time machine.
- Episode no.: Season 2 Episode 18
- Directed by: Thomas Yatsko
- Written by: J. H. Wyman; Jeff Vlaming
- Production code: 3X5117
- Original air date: April 15, 2010

Guest appearances
- Peter Weller as Alistair Peck; Laara Sadiq as Carol Bryce; Kristen Ross as Arlette Turling; Andrew McIlroy as Professor Lime

Episode chronology
← Previous "Olivia. In the Lab. With the Revolver."	Next → "The Man from the Other Side"
- Fringe season 2

"White Tulip" is the 18th episode of the second season of the American science fiction drama television series Fringe. It follows a scientist (Peter Weller) in his quest to time travel back and save his fiancée, while the Fringe team investigates the consequences of his actions, and Walter (John Noble) struggles to tell his son Peter (Joshua Jackson) he was stolen from the parallel universe as a boy.

The episode was co-written by J.H. Wyman and Jeff Vlaming, and was directed by Thomas Yatsko. Wyman later stressed the importance of "White Tulip" in the show's evolution, calling it a "mythalone" because its elements were designed to create the ideal episode to satisfy both new and hardcore viewers. Elements from this episode, in particular the idea of the white tulip as a sign of forgiveness, would be reused in later episodes.

It first aired in the United States on April 15, 2010, on Fox to an estimated 6.624 million viewers. It received positive reviews, and earned a nomination for Outstanding Sound Editing For A Series at the 62nd Primetime Emmy Awards. It was ranked the best episode of the entire series by Entertainment Weekly, while IGN and Den of Geek ranked it as the second best.

== Plot ==
Walter (John Noble) struggles with writing a letter to Peter (Joshua Jackson) to explain the events from 1985 that led Walter to bring Peter to his universe from the parallel one. As he contemplates the final letter, he and the rest of the Fringe team are called to investigate several dead bodies in the passenger car of a train. Walter, after being told the victims' personal electronics were drained of power, suspects someone drew energy from both the people and their devices' batteries. They trace the man responsible to MIT astrophysics professor Alistair Peck (Peter Weller), and enter his residence to search for clues, finding evidence that Alistair was studying time travel. Alistair arrives while the Fringe team is there, and activates a mechanism on his body, causing him to travel back in time.

Alistair reappears on the train at the same point in time as his previous travel, again having drained the people aboard it, and alters his behavior to avoid another encounter with the Fringe team. However, when they are brought to investigate this time, they have a feeling of déjà vu and find other evidence that points to Alistair, and determine that he is trying to go back in his personal time line ten months prior to May 18, 2009, in order to prevent the death of his fiancée in a car collision. Alistair is found at his MIT office. Walter, having read through Alistair's writings on time travel, offers to go in and talk to Alistair first before the armed officers attempt to seize him.

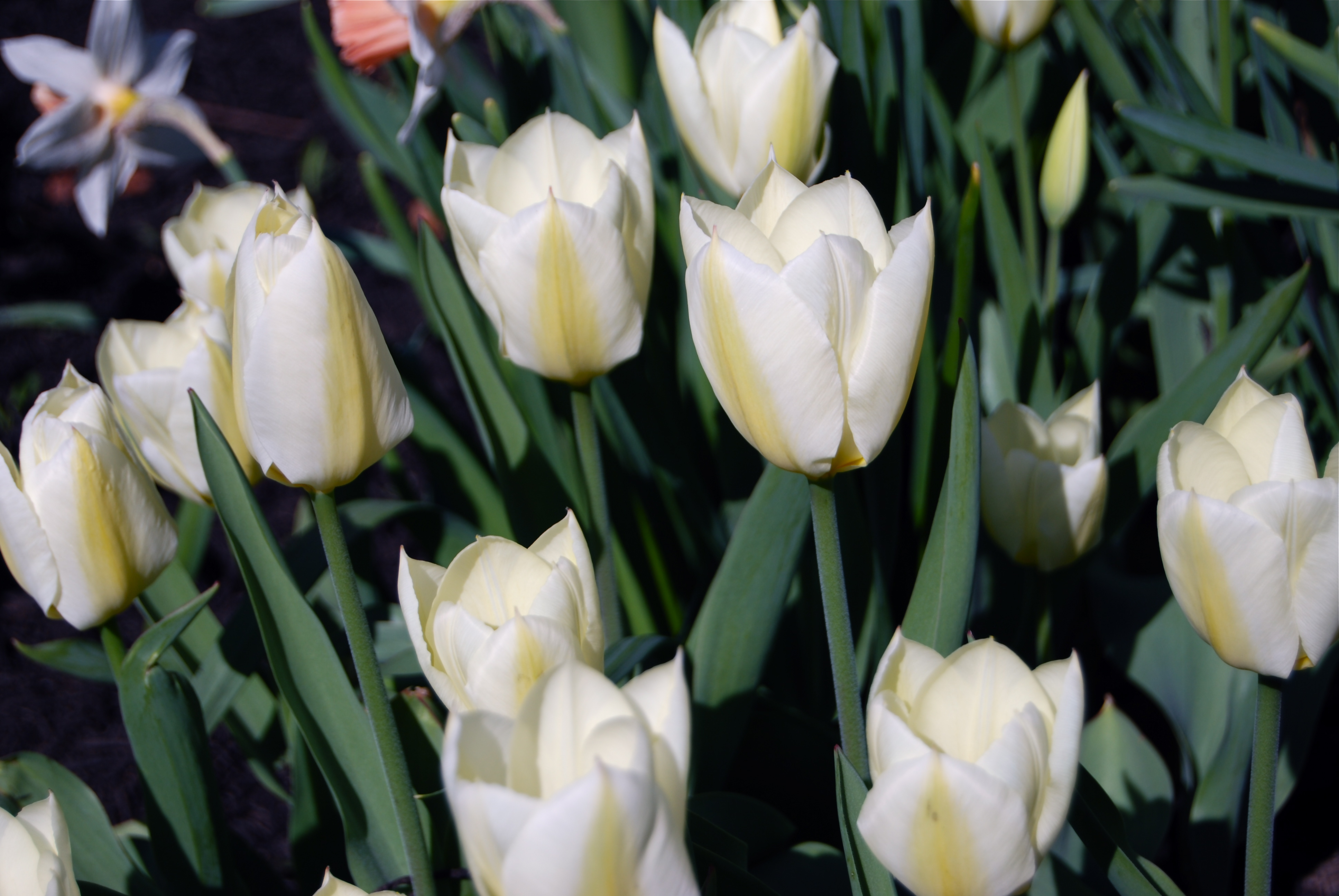
As a central theme of the episode, Walter seeks the sign of a white tulip as a sign of God's forgiveness and hope that Peter can forgive him. White tulips represent forgiveness.

Walter approaches Alistair as a fellow man of science, who is replacing components that form a time machine that he has constructed within his body. Walter professes that Alistair's attempt to jump back several months would require a great deal more power than Alistair has predicted, possibly killing hundreds in the area near where he appears. Alistair, aware of this, recalls an empty field, a few blocks from where his fiancée died, and plans to use this field where only the vegetation will die out from his arrival. Walter tells Alistair how to correct the mistake that caused him to jump to the train but warns him of the other consequences that changing events will bring, explaining that stealing Peter from the parallel universe has left him wracked with regret. Despite being a man of science, Walter's torment over the years drove him to believe in a higher power, and he hopes for a sign of God's forgiveness—and thus, eventually, Peter's—in the form of a white tulip.

Alistair considers this, but with Walter's time up, a SWAT team starts to move in. Alistair jumps back in time again by only a few hours to complete the modified power calculations based on Walter's comments, and to prepare an addressed letter he brings with him. As the SWAT team barges in, Alistair re-engages his time machine. Alistair's modifications have worked, as he finds himself in the field, minutes before his fiancée's death. Alistair is able to make it to his fiancée in time, reuniting with her in the car just long enough to say "I love you" before they are both killed by the collision.

In the present, the events of the episode never occurred, and Walter, having time to contemplate the letter to Peter instead of being called to the case, tosses it into the fireplace. Later, he receives an envelope in the mail—the one Alistair had prepared and instructed to be delivered to Walter on this specific date. Inside, Walter finds a drawing of a white tulip.

== Production ==
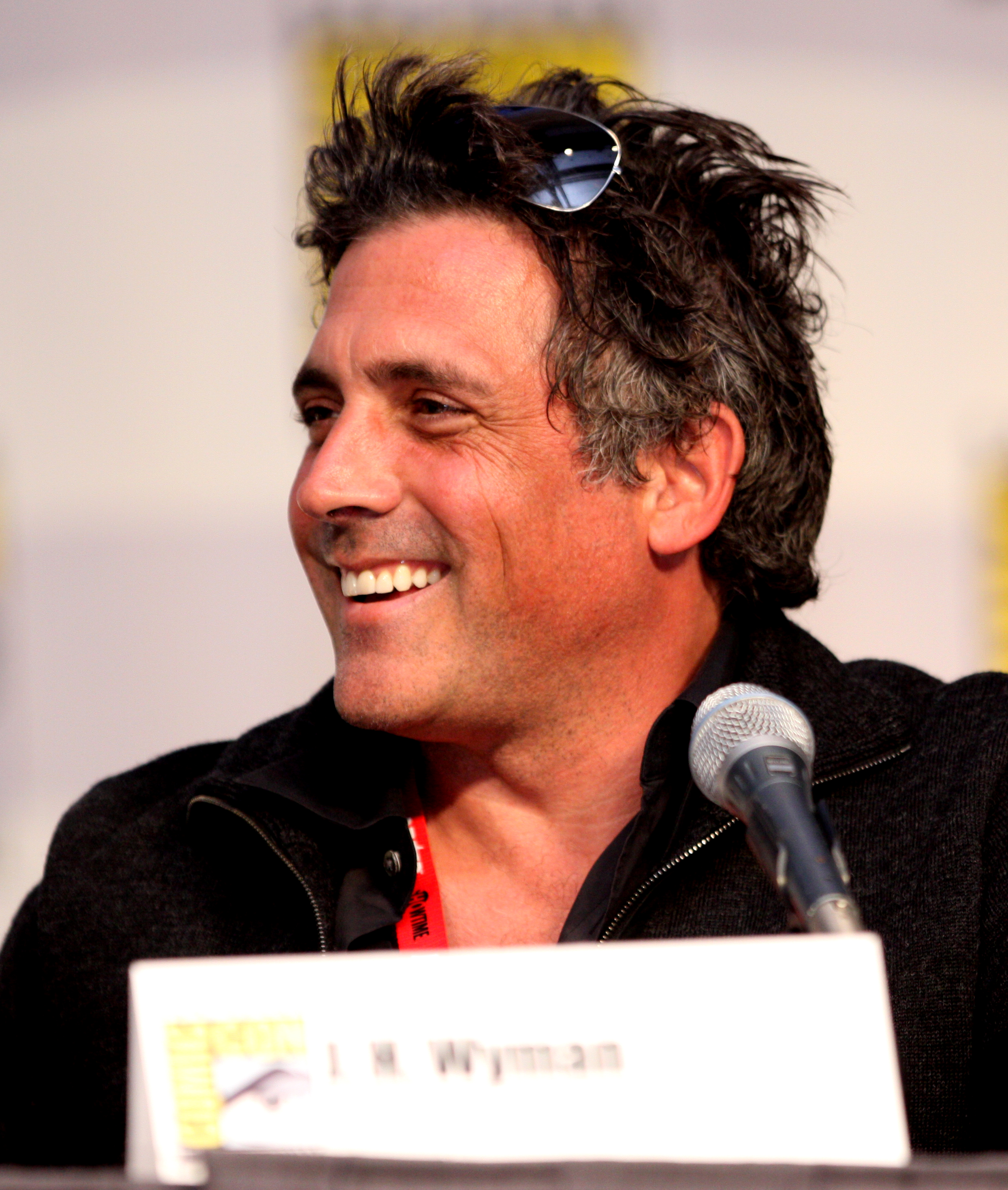
Executive producer J. H. Wyman particularly loved "White Tulip" because it was a love story.

"White Tulip" was co-written by executive producer J. H. Wyman and supervising producer Jeff Vlaming. Cinematographer Thomas Yatsko directed the episode, his first directing credit for Fringe.

IGN announced in January 2010 that actor Peter Weller had been cast in a guest starring role for an upcoming episode. Though he had normally kept his distance from episodic television because it "burns [him] out" and he was pursuing a Ph.D. at UCLA, his wife, a big Fringe fan, read the script and convinced him to accept the part of Alistair Peck, telling him "You've got to do this, it's beautiful, it's about a guy who wants to save his wife". During a conference call with journalists, Weller also cited the character's "tremendously romantic and very moving" storyline as another reason he accepted the part. He thought the four-page scripted scene between him and John Noble was "rare for television [and] wonderfully written. I was thrilled to do [Fringe]". Weller has since become a fan of Fringe because of his work in the episode, and would love to return and direct for the show. In a later Twitter post, Wyman dismissed speculation and confirmed that Weller's character Alistair Peck did indeed die at the end of the episode.

For the episode's time travel elements, sound effects editor Bruce Tanis explained his choices of sound during an interview with Designing Sound: "I used vocals from the dialog to create high-pitched jittery tones that played against the visual of his time-jumping. He would start to flicker faster and faster as he ramped up to the moment of leaping so I wanted to play up the fragmented sense of time we had visually and create the idea that he was somehow jumping over other people to land at a different point in time. It also had electrical humming and zapping to support the electrical nature of the device".

Executive producer J. H. Wyman later indicated how "White Tulip" helped with the evolution of the show in an interview: "It's very important to constantly try to attract more viewers and to try and not make the show alienating... Our solution came in the form of ‘White Tulip' and episodes like that, because we realized what we need to do to satiate both our hardcore fans and our financial responsibility is to create a term that we coined a 'mythalone.' It sounds really simple when you say it now, like, ‘Yes, sure, you have a great standalone case, plus you thread in some great mythology.' But I've got to tell you it took us a long time to get there and realize it. Now we have that our template for telling stories that we think satisfies both parties". He and Pinkner later listed "White Tulip" as one of their favorite episodes.

As with other Fringe episodes, Fox and Science Olympiad released a lesson plan for grade school children based upon the science depicted in "White Tulip"; the lesson's intention was for "students [to] learn about scientific concepts related to time such as astronomy and physics, with a focus on timekeeping."

== Reception ==
=== Ratings ===
"White Tulip" was watched by an estimated 6.62 million viewers in the United States, with a 4.0/7 share among all households and a 2.5/7 share among those aged 18–49.

=== Reviews ===
Reviews of "White Tulip" were overwhelmingly positive. Ken Tucker from Entertainment Weekly enjoyed the episode, writing "Fringe is becoming ever more adroit at blending its mythology with its paranormal cases". He also praised guest star Peter Weller's performance. After initially expecting a "filler" episode, Ramsey Isler of IGN said he was "pleasantly proven wrong", as the "story turned out to be one of the best of the series". Isler continued that "the writers really did a good job of integrating the overall mythology into a standalone story that is actually damn good... It's brilliant storytelling". Andrew Hanson of Los Angeles Times enjoyed the episode, but wished Astrid got more screen time.

Steve Heisler of The A.V. Club gave the episode an A, explaining "Horror. Confusion. It's a moment that finds Fringe at its finest". New York Magazine's Tim Grierson loved all the interactions between Noble and Weller, and thought they were so "compelling together that they helped justify an episode that could have very easily been terribly hokey — instead, it was one of the season’s best standalone stories". Josh Wigler from MTV also thought the scenes between Noble and Weller were the best thing about the episode. Jane Boursaw of TV Squad wrote it was "another great episode that served to propel the story forward, and another great performance by John Noble". Television Without Pity gave the episode a B+.

The A.V. Club ranked Fringe the 15th best show of 2010, in particular highlighting "White Tulip", while Den of Geek listed it as the second best of the series. Jeff Jensen of Entertainment Weekly named "White Tulip" the best episode of the entire series, calling it "a near-perfect blend of mythology and stand-alone episode. 'White Tulip' is Fringe's purest, finest example of fulsome emotions tempered by stringent ideas. The tulip of the title represents forgiveness — faith in love — and became within the series a semi-recurring symbol of fragile hope, and, to the show's audience, a cynosure of the devotion of Fringe fandom." IGN ranked it as the second best, explaining that "despite a few technical flaws with special effects and a little under-utilization of Weller in the first half, the veteran cast delivers an excellent script with skill."

"White Tulip" was referenced multiple times in the season three episode "Subject 13". Executive producer J. H. Wyman later commented in an interview that "the 'White Tulip' stuff is all connected thematically because that was the episode where Walter believes in God," and further explained that these themes would return again in the season three finale. The final reference to the white tulip is in season five, the series finale, which aired January 18, 2013.

=== Awards and nominations ===
"White Tulip" was nominated for Outstanding Sound Editing For A Series at the Creative Arts portion of the 62nd Primetime Emmy Awards, with the crew composed of Supervising Sound Editor Paul Curtis, Sound Editors Rick Norman and Bruce Tanis, Music Editor Paul Apelgren, and Foley Artists Shelley Roden and Rick Partlow. It lost to an episode of 24. "White Tulip" was also nominated for Outstanding Sound at the 2010 HPA Awards, but it lost to an episode of House.

Also at the 62nd Primetime Emmy Awards, writers J.H. Wyman and Jeff Vlaming submitted "White Tulip" for consideration in the Outstanding Writing for a Drama Series category, but failed to garner a nomination. Peter Weller submitted the episode for consideration in the Outstanding Guest Actor in a Drama Series category. Weller and fellow guest actor Leonard Nimoy (who appeared in "Over There") were not chosen for nominations.
