= The Equation =

- Fringe episode
- Episode no.: Season 1 Episode 8
- Directed by: Gwyneth Horder-Payton
- Written by: J. R. Orci; David H. Goodman
- Production code: 3T7657
- Original air date: November 18, 2008

Guest appearances
- William Sadler as Dr. Bruce Sumner; Randall Duk Kim as Dashiell Kim; Gillian Jacobs as Joanne Ostler; Charlie Tahan as Ben Stockton; Adam Grupper as Andrew Stockton; Chance Kelly as Mitchell Loeb; Kate Hodge as Abby Stockton; Michael Cerveris as the Observer

Episode chronology
← Previous "In Which We Meet Mr. Jones"	Next → "The Dreamscape"
- Fringe season 1

"The Equation" is the eighth episode of the first season of the American science fiction drama television series Fringe. The episode follows the Fringe team's investigation into the kidnapping of a young musical prodigy (Charlie Tahan) who has become obsessed with finishing one piece of music. Dr. Walter Bishop (John Noble) returns to St. Claire's Hospital in an effort to find the boy's whereabouts.

The episode was written by supervising producer J. R. Orci and co-executive producer David H. Goodman, and was directed by Gwyneth Horder-Payton. Gillian Jacobs guest starred as the boy's kidnapper. The episode featured her character in a "pretty violent and quite messy" fight with Olivia Dunham (Anna Torv), Torv's first for the series. The two actresses spent several weeks practicing the fight's choreography.

"The Equation" first aired in the United States on November 18, 2008, garnering an estimated 9.175 million viewers. The episode was the Fox network's fifth ranked show for the week, and helped Fox win the night among adults aged 18 to 49. Critical reception to "The Equation" ranged from mixed to positive, with most reviewers praising the asylum storyline.

== Plot ==
While helping fix a woman's car engine on the side of the road in Middletown, Connecticut, Andrew Stockston (Adam Grupper) sees a sequence of red and green flashing lights and is hypnotized into a suggestive state. Upon 'waking up', he does not have any memory of what happened while hypnotized, but sees that the woman and his son Ben (Charlie Tahan), a young musical prodigy, are missing. Phillip Broyles (Lance Reddick) reveals that similar cases have ended with the victims being returned, but left insane from the trauma of the incident. All the victims were academics and accomplished in their respective fields.

When interviewing Andrew, Olivia Dunham (Anna Torv) learns that nine months previously, Ben survived a car accident with a new, extraordinary ability to play the piano, despite never taking lessons. Dr. Walter Bishop (John Noble) recalls memories of red and green lights, but he's unable to remember more. While trying to dredge up the old memories, Walter recounts a previous unsuccessful mind control experiment he had worked on for an advertising agency, who wished to compel customers to buy their products using flashing lights. He deduces that someone succeeded in producing the lights using wavelengths, and these caused Andrew to sustain a "hypnagogic trance" that allowed his son to be abducted. He successfully tests an experiment on Peter Bishop (Joshua Jackson).

Andrew's sketch leads to the identification of the kidnapper as Joanne Ostler (Gillian Jacobs), a MIT neurologist who was previously believed deceased. Joanne tricks Ben into helping her complete an unfinished equation by using the image of his mother, who died in the car accident. Meanwhile, Walter suddenly remembers that he heard about the lights from former mathematician Dashiell Kim (Randall Duk Kim), an old bunkmate at St. Claire's Hospital who disappeared under similar circumstances. To discover the child's whereabouts, Olivia encourages Walter to return to St. Claire's. The visit does not go well, and Walter is held by hospital administrator Dr. Bruce Sumner (William Sadler), who remains unconvinced of Walter's sanity.

Peter figures out Joanne's assumed name using an FBI database, while Walter manages to convince Kim into giving up a vague description of Joanne's whereabouts by telling him there is a little boy who needs their help. Kim says he was kept in "a dungeon in a red castle." Olivia and Peter use the information to find the boy once they arrange for Walter's release. However, Joanne escapes with the completed formula, which she gives to Mitchell Loeb (Chance Kelly). Loeb kills her, but not before using the equation to allow him to pass through solid matter.

== Production ==
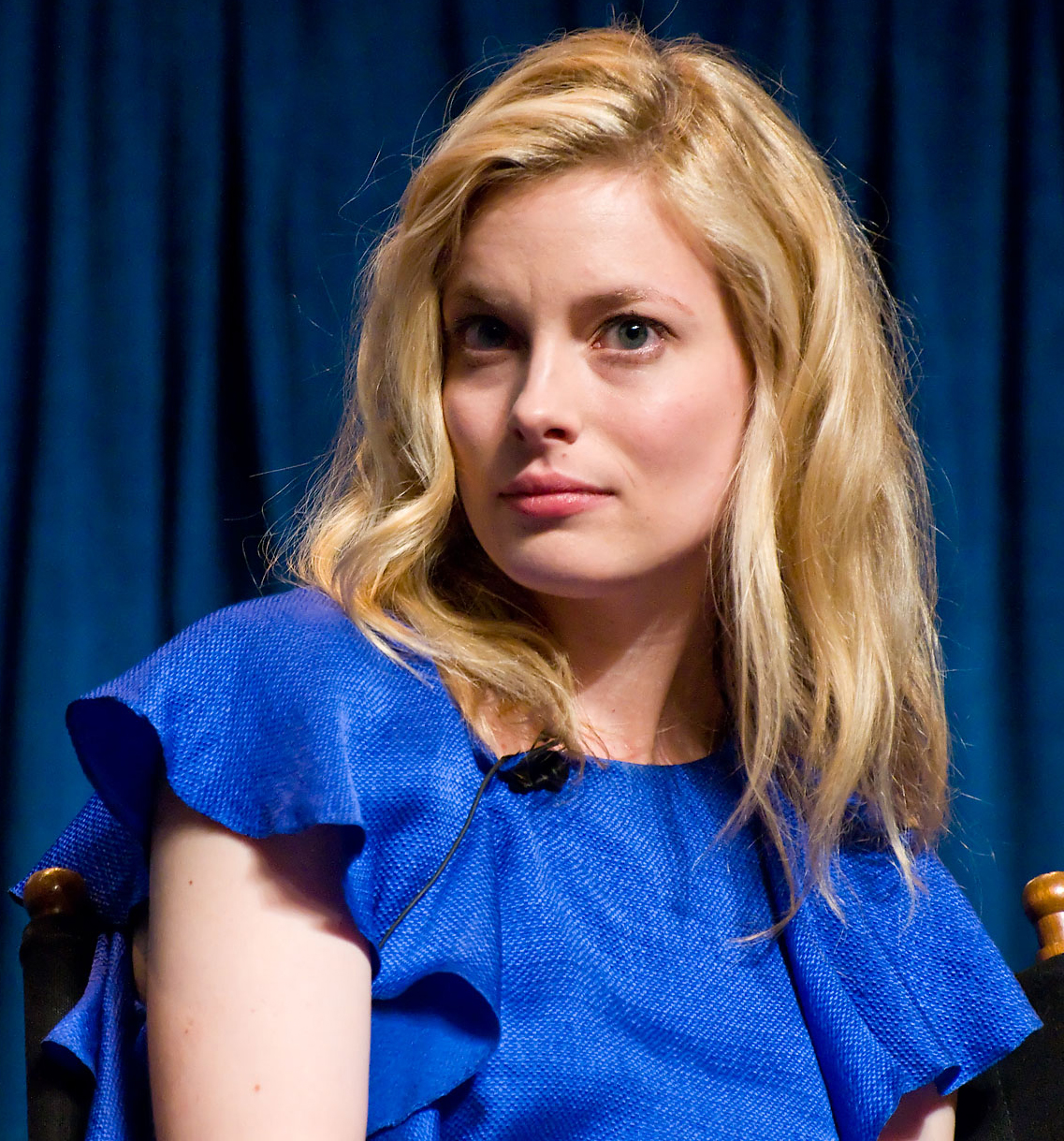
Gillian Jacobs guest starred as the episode's antagonist

"The Equation" was written by supervising producer J. R. Orci and co-executive producer David H. Goodman. Both would go on to separately write other first season episodes, including Orci's "The Transformation" and Goodman's "Safe", which resolved the fate of the eponymous equation. "The Equation" was directed by filmmaker Gwyneth Horder-Payton, her first and only credit for the series to date.

The episode featured guest actress Gillian Jacobs as the kidnapper Joanne Ostler. Jacobs explained her character's motivations, "I'm a very mysterious figure, and at the beginning of the episode you see that I have taken this boy, have kidnapped him. I have taken him to this room and have him hooked him up to these EKG machines. I'm trying to get him to finish writing this piano piece which I need to help solve an equation... It's very important to me."

Horder-Payton considered the confrontation between Olivia and Joanne to be the former's "first big fight scene." She added, "It's been well choreographed and they've been practicing for several weeks." According to Torv, she and Jacobs broke the moves down "really simply" and then "put them together into really small little bits." The director called it a "pretty violent and quite messy" fight, to which first assistant director Colin MacLellan added, "It's a pretty phenomenal brawl actually to have two women kick the crap out of each other."

The first season DVD includes several scenes that were omitted from the final cut of the episode. The first centers on Walter waking up in the middle of the night, explaining to a disgruntled Peter that he's attempting to "shift my circadian rhythm to the nocturnal cycle." The other scene shows Olivia and Peter playing poker, which leads her to realize an important part of the episode's case.

== Themes and analysis ==
Flashing multicolored lights, specifically red and green, are a consistent theme of the first season, with Into the Looking Glass: Exploring the Worlds of Fringe author Sarah Clarke Stuart calling them "noteworthy recurring images." They can also be seen in the computer graphics of the Observer's binoculars, as well as during the second and third seasons as a way to distinguish the two universes.

The character of Walter goes through much development during the first season. Stuart believed that he changes the most out of the main cast, and his return to St. Claire's reflects this progression. Actor John Noble explained his character's evolution in a November 2008 interview, "We see Walter from a different angle, very vulnerable. He goes back to the asylum again, and we see the very, very fearful man return for a while. Although he does have some wonderful moments earlier in the episode, when he goes back inside he turns into this incredibly fearful, stuttering fellow that we saw when we first met him. It's a very interesting journey we see Walter go through."

In the episode, Walter sees himself several times while staying in the mental institution. Many reviewers expressed curiosity about this "Visitor" or "Second Walter". After looking through "Walter's Lab Notes," released by Fox after each episode, Ramsey Isler of IGN speculated that Walter suffered from a multiple personality disorder, while AOL TV's Jane Boursaw thought it was either an hallucination or his alternate universe counterpart.

== Reception ==
=== Ratings ===
"The Equation" first broadcast on the Fox network in the United States on November 18, 2008. It was watched by an estimated 9.18 million viewers, earning a 4.1/10 ratings share among adults aged 18 to 49, meaning that it was seen by 4.4 percent of all 18- to 49-year-olds, and 11 percent of all 18- to 49-year-olds watching television at the time of broadcast. The episode also received a 5.6/8 ratings share among all households. Fringe and its lead-in show, House M.D., helped Fox win the night in the adult demographic, as it was Fringe's highest rating since the season's second episode. It was Fox's fifth ranked show for the week.

=== Reviews ===
"First off, the episode itself works quite well. It's nice to see the show move away from the gooey pseudo-biology that has driven the show thus far. The mystery of the week plays out quite well, with an effective (and different) opening sequence, as well as a compelling scientific mystery that doesn't sound like fakey psychobabble".

— IGN reviewer Travis Fickett

The episode received mixed to positive reviews from television critics. Fearnet columnist Alyse Wax called it a "pretty good episode", and believed it to be "far more enjoyable than last week's", as it lacked that episode's "conspiracy nonsense" and John Scott storyline. However, Wax continued that "The Equation" "seemed rather pedestrian" because "nothing too freaky" happened, and wished that Walter and Peter had been used more. Jane Boursaw of AOL TV considered Walter's return to the asylum "heartbreaking".

IGN's Travis Fickett rated "The Equation" 7.5/10, and called it a "solid episode" despite a few perceived plotholes. He liked Walter and Peter's actions in the asylum, and concluded "At this point, whether a solid single episode is enough to keep you watching Fringe likely has to do with your overall patience with the series and whatever its ultimate goals might be." Erin Dougherty of Cinema Blend called it the best episode since "The Same Old Story" since it contained "suspense and drama and a minimal amount of conspiracy theories", making her feel "seriously giddy". While still calling it "entertaining", she disliked Walter seeing himself in the asylum, believing it "was really strange and didn’t go with the flow of the story".

The A.V. Club writer Noel Murray graded the episode with a B+, explaining that he believed it to be mainly an original story; what kept him from promoting it to the "elusive 'A' level–something no Fringe episode has yet done for me" was the ending, which was "like something out of dozens of mediocre cop shows". Despite this, Murray found it and the asylum storyline to be "compelling". Conversely, UGO Networks was critical of the episode, writing "Fringe continues to wobble in story quality. Last night's episode was a perfectly good way to waste an hour, but far off the track of last week's episodes. The episode featured some plot conveniences that were a bit hard to swallow".
