= Bound (Fringe) =

- Fringe episode
- Olivia Dunham in pursuit. Her action scenes for the episode were praised, with reviewers comparing her to the 24 character Jack Bauer.
- Episode no.: Season 1 Episode 11
- Directed by: Frederick E. O. Toye
- Written by: J. J. Abrams; Jeff Pinkner; Alex Kurtzman; Roberto Orci
- Production code: 3T7660
- Original air date: January 20, 2009

Guest appearances
- Chance Kelly as Mitchell Loeb; Trini Alvarado as Samantha Loeb; Michael Gaston as Sanford Harris; Ari Graynor as Rachel Dunham; Lily Pilblad as Ella Blake; Sarah Wilson as Tara Coleman; Peter Fernandez as Dr. Russell Simon; Stephen Schnetzer as Professor Miles Kinberg; Chinasa Ogbuagu as Lloyd; Michael Cerveris as the Observer

Episode chronology
← Previous "Safe"	Next → "The No-Brainer"
- Fringe season 1

"Bound" is the eleventh episode of the first season of the American science fiction drama television series Fringe. It follows the aftermath of Olivia's (Anna Torv) capture in the previous episode, and subsequent efforts to identify and apprehend her kidnappers. Along with a double agent, Olivia's investigation is hampered by the appearance of Sanford Harris, an old adversary hired to audit Fringe Division.

The episode was written by series co-creators J. J. Abrams, Alex Kurtzman, and Roberto Orci, as well as executive producer Jeff Pinkner. Frederick E. O. Toye served as the episode's director and sought to create a "creepy and weird" atmosphere for Olivia's kidnapping scene to help emphasize her "terrible circumstances." First director Gary Rake believed Olivia's action scenes took her to a "higher level", and Torv herself enjoyed filming them. In addition, the episode was the first to feature Ari Graynor as Olivia's sister, Rachel. Other guest actors included Chance Kelly, Michael Gaston, Lily Pilyblad, Sara Wilson, Stephen Schnetzer, and Peter Jay Fernandez.

The episode first aired on January 20, 2009, on the Fox network, and was watched by an estimated 11.96 million viewers. "Bound" received generally positive reviews from television critics, as many viewed it as an improvement over previous episodes. Actor Joshua Jackson noted the importance of "Bound" developmentally for the series. At the 61st Primetime Emmy Awards, the episode was submitted in the "Outstanding Directing for a Drama Series" and "Outstanding Writing for a Drama Series" categories. Both were unsuccessful in securing nominations.

== Plot ==
Following Olivia Dunham's (Anna Torv) kidnapping from the previous episode, "Safe", Fringe Division works to find her location. Unbeknownst to her, one of Olivia's captors is Fringe agent Mitchell Loeb (Chance Kelly). He gives her a spinal tap and returns to help with the investigation. Olivia fights off the remaining men and escapes, taking several medical samples with her. She hides the samples right before being arrested by Sanford Harris (Michael Gaston), a former adversary who was hired to audit Fringe Division. Years before, Olivia exposed and prosecuted Harris for sexually assaulting three female Marine privates, and he now wants revenge. Now recovering in Boston Hospital, Olivia's judgment is questioned by Harris for working with the mentally unstable scientist Walter Bishop (John Noble) and his law-breaking son Peter Bishop (Joshua Jackson). Harris tells her she cannot investigate her own abduction.

Back at Fringe Division, Olivia learns that the building she was kept at is empty and contains no traces of her captors. Olivia, along with Walter and Peter, recovers the hidden samples. They soon hear of the murder of epidemiologist Miles Kinberg, who was killed by a chemical that created a giant, slug-like single cell of acute viral nasopharyngitis in his stomach. Olivia learns that Kinberg was about to start a job at the Centers for Disease Control, and that another scientist, Dr. Russell Simon, is also set to begin working there. She connects Kinberg's killers with her own captors based on the similarities of her stolen samples. Fringe Division brings Simon in for protection, but he is killed soon after when Loeb gives him the same chemical agent.

Meanwhile, Olivia's sister Rachel (Ari Graynor) and niece Ella (Lily Pilblad) come to visit. Olivia succeeds in connecting the murder to Loeb by recognizing his shoes from when she was a captive. She goes to search his house but accidentally runs into his wife and accomplice, Samantha (Trini Alvarado). Loeb tells his wife to kill Olivia, and after a struggle, Olivia fatally shoots Samantha. Olivia obtains the necessary evidence to capture Loeb and questions him about her abduction. She gets little information until she shows him pictures of his dead wife, as he was unaware she had been killed. Loeb angrily tells Olivia about "two sides" and that he was trying to save her.

== Production ==
"Bound" was written by co-creators J. J. Abrams, Alex Kurtzman, and Roberto Orci, and executive producer Jeff Pinkner. Producer Frederick E. O. Toye worked as the director. For Olivia's spinal tap scene, Toye attempted to create a "creepy and weird" atmosphere. He explained, "She's strapped down, she's in a gurney. They're going to pull fluid out of her spine. It's creepy and weird. That's what we're going for, to try and set it up as a really awkward, horrible environment to be trapped in." Toye and the crew wanted to make it "as visually interesting and dramatic as possible," and added in dripping water and "creepy" lighting to emphasize Olivia's "terrible circumstances." First assistant director Gary Rake noted that the episode "took the character Olivia to a higher level... She's a lot more active, which is very exciting for us."

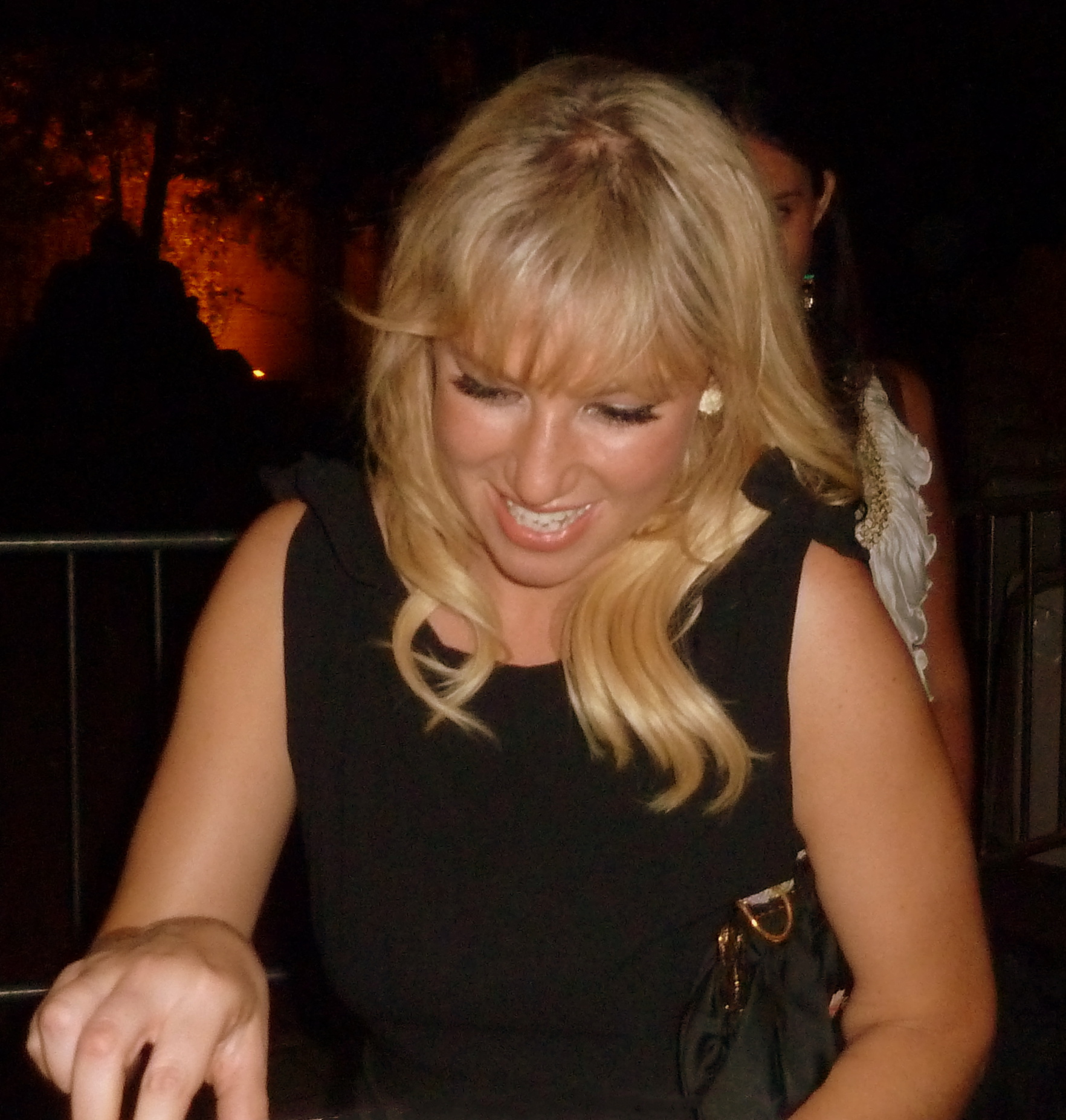
"Bound" featured the first appearance of guest actress Ari Graynor as Olivia's sister Rachel.

According to Orci, the idea behind the episode's fringe case originated with the show's "amazing scientific consultants," who suggested "super-sizing a common virus" when the writers were trying to brainstorm episode cases. Andrew Orloff, the Creative Director and Visual Effects Supervisor of Zoic Studios, considered it one of the most challenging effects his company made for the season.

Up to the point the episode aired, Anna Torv considered it her favorite episode, explaining, "In ‘Bound,’ when Olivia gets kidnapped, they’re giving her a spinal tap, and she wakes up and breaks out – it was just bang, bang, bang, bang, bang. I found it really easy to follow and kind of energetic, and I really loved filming that." In reference to Trini Alvarado, the other actress in their fight scene, Torv also mentioned when shooting it "We had so much fun! That's probably my favorite sequence in the show thus far."

Actor Joshua Jackson believed the episode was important developmentally for the series, explaining it was "creatively when the show really hit its stride in the first season." Jackson continued, "I think right around the midway point of [the first] season, the show decided what it wanted to be. From about the midway point, it got on a pretty good streak of episodes. I can’t remember the exact number, but the two-part episode where Dunham gets kidnapped. After that, it was pretty clear; we introduced the bad guys for the season, and there was a much clearer narrative drive through the rest of the season."

In December 2008, Entertainment Weekly reported that actress Ari Graynor would be joining the cast as a guest star for a minimum of three episodes, beginning in January. Her character, Olivia's younger sister Rachel, would be visiting Olivia for a few weeks because "she's dealing with some man trouble back home", as described by an insider. "Bound" marked the first episode to feature the new character. Other guest actors included Chance Kelly, Michael Gaston, Lily Pilyblad, Sara Wilson, Stephen Schnetzer, and Peter Jay Fernandez.

== Reception ==
=== Ratings ===
"Bound" was first broadcast on the Fox network in the United States on January 20, 2009. It was watched by an estimated 11.96 million viewers, an improvement over the season's episode average of 8.8 million. "Bound" earned a 7.0/10 ratings share among adults aged 18 to 49. This means that it was seen by 7.0 percent of all 18- to 49-year-olds, and 10 percent of all 18- to 49-year-olds watching television at the time of broadcast.

=== Reviews ===
"I love this show! And seeing it after its weeks-long hiatus just reminds me once again how much I love it and why. Part of it's because they throw little clues at us, and we're tasked to try and figure them out. Where did we see this guy before? What does this mean? How does it tie into the past? Are these new characters part of a larger conspiracy? It's a fun puzzle that isn't dumbed down for the audience."

— TV Squad reviewer Jane Boursaw

"Bound" has received generally positive reviews from television critics. IGN's Ramsey Isler rated "Bound" 9.6/10, explaining that the episode is "an energetic start to second half of the season, and it's hopefully a sign of things to come." Olivia's "amazing" action sequence reminded Isler of the Fox television show 24, and he equated Olivia with that series' protagonist Jack Bauer. Writing for The A.V. Club, critic Zach Handlen also praised the "badassery" of the opening sequence as well as Olivia herself; he graded the episode with an A, calling it "a gripping, bizarre, occasionally wince-inducing hour of television; after a spotty first half of the season, Fringe is finally hitting its stride." Jane Boursaw of TV Squad enjoyed the episode; like Isler, she also compared Olivia to Jack Bauer, and expressed suspicion that new characters Rachel and Ella were "part of a bigger conspiracy".

Bryant L. Griffin of Airlock Alpha compared Olivia to the character Sydney Bristow from the television series Alias, and opined that Fringe "continues to exhibit a satisfying stride." Griffin, however, was disappointed that events from the previous episode were ignored, believing it to be a mistake to continue emphasising formulaic storytelling rather than a serialized format. Andrew Hanson from the Los Angeles Times felt that despite the extra ten minutes, "Bound" was "more like a two-hour episode... being crammed into half the time". He thought the episode's four writers were "all busy", as there were three stories going on at once, and compared Olivia to the similarly characterized Lost character Jack Shephard. Hanson concluded, "But how bad can it be when my biggest complaint about a show is that I want more? And now that the cold winter of reruns has passed, we should be getting just that."

Television Without Pity graded the episode with a B. Various reviewers disliked the character Sanford Harris, calling him "stereotypical, "one-note", and "unconvincing." Jeff Jensen of Entertainment Weekly noted the episode's importance in the series' history, and named it the ninth best episode of the series, explaining "Arriving midway through Fringe's shaky first season, 'Bound' was billed as a reboot that applied lessons learned from earlier episodes. (The plot mirrored the critical tune-up, with a cranky internal affairs agent conducting an audit on the Fringe division). The key focus: Making Olivia a richer, warmer, more proactive character. Mission accomplished. So began a series of rookie year corrections that helped Fringe find its voice."

=== Awards and nominations ===
At the 61st Primetime Emmy Awards, director Frederick E. O. Toye submitted the episode for consideration in the Outstanding Directing for a Drama Series category, but did not receive a nomination. J. J. Abrams, Alex Kurtzman, Roberto Orci, Jeff Pinkner, the writers of "Bound", also submitted their work in the episode for consideration in the Outstanding Writing for a Drama Series category, but received no nominations.
