= The Cure (Fringe) =

- Fringe episode
- The Fringe team survey the dead outside of Holly's Diner
- Episode no.: Season 1 Episode 6
- Directed by: Bill Eagles
- Written by: Felicia D. Henderson; Brad Caleb Kane
- Production code: 3T7655
- Original air date: October 21, 2008

Guest appearances
- Maria Dizzia as Emily Kramer; Marjan Neshat as Claire Williams; Chris Eigeman as David Esterbrook; William Hill as Officer Marty Pitts; Lisa Emery as Paula Kramer; Robert Eli as Ken Williams; Alok Tewari as Dr. Nadim Patel; Michael Cerveris as the Observer

Episode chronology
← Previous "Power Hungry"	Next → "In Which We Meet Mr. Jones"
- Fringe season 1

"The Cure" is the sixth episode of the first season of the American science fiction drama television series Fringe. It followed two women suffering from a fictional disease, who are then given radiation drugs and exploited by a pharmaceutical company to cause nearby individuals' brains to boil.

The episode was written by Felicia D. Henderson and Brad Caleb Kane, and directed by Bill Eagles. Executive producer Jeff Pinkner meant for the first six episodes of the first season to serve as a "prologue", while the following episodes would get "into the next chapter" of the series.

"The Cure" first aired in the United States on October 21, 2008 on the Fox network to an estimated 8.91 million viewers. It received mixed to negative reviews, with many critics doubting the plausibility of the science depicted in the episode.

== Plot ==
In Milford, Massachusetts, men in Hazmat suits drop a woman (Maria Dizzia) out of a white van, who then enters a nearby diner. Suffering from memory loss, the woman becomes irritated under a cop's questioning and causes the other patrons' brains to boil and then explode; she dies soon after in the same fashion.

The Fringe team consisting of Olivia Dunham (Anna Torv), Walter Bishop (John Noble), and Peter Bishop (Joshua Jackson) arrive, and Agent Phillip Broyles (Lance Reddick) briefs them that the woman, Emily Kramer, disappeared two weeks previously, and that her corpse exhibits three times the radiation as the other victims. Upon further investigation of her body, Walter concludes she was suffering from a rare and incurable disease, "Bellini's lymphocemia," but was mysteriously cured. Further tests reveal Kramer was held against her will, and given nootropic drugs intravenously that makes her brain emit a microwave burst, then set loose by her experimenters as a test.

Another woman with the same disease, Claire Williams (Marjan Neshat), is reported missing soon after. Before her disappearance, Claire's husband tells them she also was recently cured. Her captors are shown, commenting that "the last one was a test, this one counts". While rifling through Emily's house, Olivia and Peter learn Emily and Claire were friends, and that Emily's husband also knew her despite denying it earlier. He tells them they and other victims of the disease undertook private research and discovered a cure with the help of a physician, Dr. Nadim Patel (Alok Tewari). Before committing suicide, the doctor tells them David Esterbrook (Chris Eigeman), the chief scientist of a competitor of Massive Dynamic, is the one responsible. Olivia confronts Esterbrook at a medical conference to discover his motivations, only to be threatened by him; Broyles admonishes her for intimidating such a high-profile individual in a public setting.

To get to the high-profile Esterbrook, Peter makes a deal with Nina Sharp (Blair Brown), who tells him where to find Claire before she can be turned into a radioactive bomb. The FBI storms the building, and Olivia is able to give Claire the cure before her head explodes. Estebrook arrogantly tells Olivia his lawyers will spring him out of any trouble, and she publicly arrests him to ensure the press finds out, causing his company's stock to dramatically decrease in value. After Broyles lectures her, Olivia tells him her emotions (which she had exhibited strongly all episode) make her a better agent.

In a sideplot, Olivia reveals that she shot her abusive stepfather when she was nine years old, but he survived and disappeared soon after. The strong emotions Olivia exhibited in the episode were because the events take place on her birthday, and her stepfather sends her a card every year to let her know "he's still out there". The final scene shows Olivia opening a birthday card from her stepfather.

== Production ==
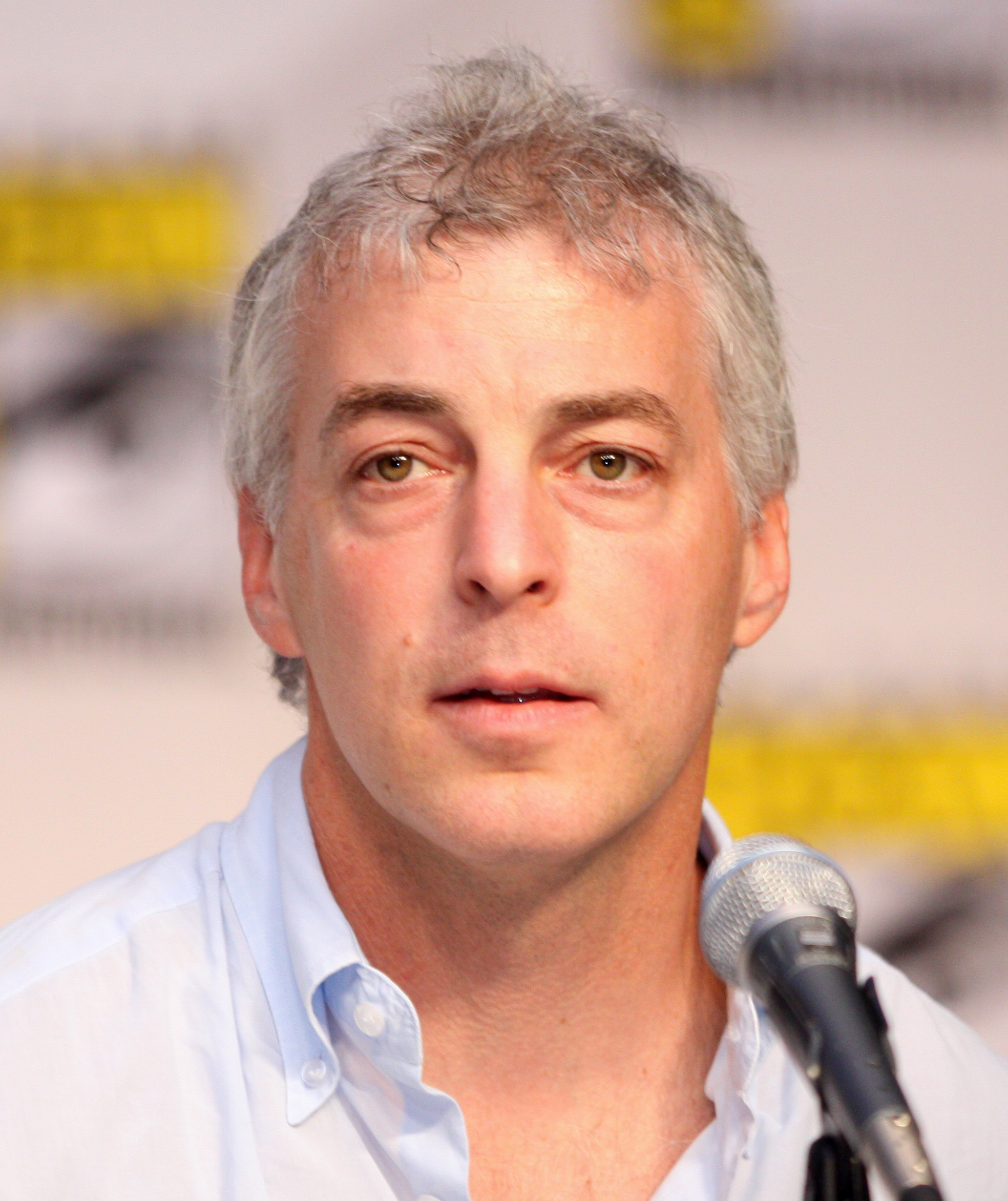
Executive producer Jeff Pinkner indicated that "The Cure" ended the "prologue" of the first six episodes of the season.

"The Cure" was written by co-executive producer Felicia D. Henderson and co-producer Brad Caleb Kane, while filmmaker Bill Eagles directed it. In an interview with the Los Angeles Times, executive producer Jeff Pinkner stated that the first six episodes of the first season were a "prologue" that ended with "The Cure," and that the following episodes, beginning with "In Which We Meet Mr. Jones", were "getting into the next chapter" of the series.

Pinkner also told the Los Angeles Times that "Bellini's lymphocemia", the disease depicted in the episode, was invented by the writers, but its characteristics are real. He elaborated "We just didn't want to imply that individuals working on their own could cure it. We didn't want to be irresponsible to people with the real disease". Some critics have noted that "Bellini's lymphocemia" may have been a reference to Italian physician and anatomist Lorenzo Bellini.

The episode featured one-time guest appearances by actors Chris Eigeman, Maria Dizzia, Marjan Neshat, William Hill, Lisa Emery, Robert Eli, and Alok Tewari. Eigeman's David Esterbrook's assistant was named after Elizabeth Sarnoff, a television writer and producer. Some of her work includes Lost, another series created by J. J. Abrams.

For the opening scene, a "special kind of blood" was placed in and around the actors' eyes to simulate their brains boiling. For the scene in which the actress is pushed up against a glass door, the special effects department created a device wearing a brown wig with an explosive charge designed to imitate the actress' head exploding. Director Bill Eagles described the scene as "imagin[ing] an egg in your microwave spinning around and around at high voltage. What happens? Bang! It just explodes."

== Reception ==
=== Ratings ===
On its initial broadcast on October 21, 2008, "The Cure" was watched by an estimated 8.91 million viewers in the United States. It garnered a 5.5/8 ratings share for all households, and was Fox's ninth most watched show of the week.

=== Reviews ===
Reviews for the episode ranged from mixed to negative. TV Squad writer Jane Boursaw noted that Broyles "is surely one of the most intense guys on TV", and also enjoyed Walter's scenes. Josie Kafka from Open Salon thought the fringe cases each week were "an odd way to build a mythology: the Big Secret seems to be that people in positions of power are evil and do evil things, often for money. But if Peter's right, and all these stand-alones are also detailing a series of steps taken by the Big Bads in preparation for something... well, that's an exciting idea." She gave it "two out of four Expendable Gerbils." io9's Annalee Newitz praised the episode, declaring it made her "officially a watcher of Fringe, rather than a sampler". She continued, "It was the first time that the show really gelled... I think Fringe hit its stride last night because it finally showed us our main characters' true strengths... More importantly, Fringe has finally gotten into its main groove: human experimentation. That's what links all the scooby gang's investigations together into the Pattern, and that's what makes this show particularly timely in an age when people are scared of how biotechnology will change humanity."

"The level of preposterous is just too high, and the level of fun and excitement far too low. There was an awful lot of talking about very little in this episode. The opening gross out had a 'been there, done that' feeling."

— IGN reviewer Travis Fickett

Further reviews tended to be negative. IGN's Travis Fickett rated the episode 6.0/10, explaining "It's starting to feel as if Walter's loony logic is starting to influence the actual writing of Fringe." Fickett criticized Walter's science and "silly ranting[s]", Olivia's stepfather storyline, and believed certain lines of dialogue to be "dangerously close to self-parody." Sarah Stegall from SFScope was skeptical of the episode's science, and explained "I really don't want any more of this. I'm tired of this formulaic series. I'm tired of Anna Torv's earnest, sad expressions—can we get this woman to laugh once or twice? Joshua Jackson and Kirk Acevedo are good supports and foils for Olivia, but there's no there there when it comes to Agent Dunham." Patrick Kevin Day from the Los Angeles Times liked the opening sequence, but was distracted from fully enjoying the episode because he thought the science was "wonky." The A.V. Club columnist Noel Murray graded the episode with a B, explaining he liked Chris Eigeman's presence and the efforts at further developing the characters, but questioned the Pattern storyline, despite admitting that he does not require rational scientific explanations in science fiction. Tim Grierson of New York Magazine disliked the focus on Olivia, calling it "a long hour of television." Referring to Olivia's "feminist" speech to Broyles, Grierson continued, "It's sort of cute how Fringe occasionally pretends that it's more than just a freak show. But if they're going to focus on a character, it should be Walter — though we shudder to think how his flatulence will factor into the plot."
