= The No-Brainer =

- Fringe episode
- Episode no.: Season 1 Episode 12
- Directed by: John Polson
- Written by: David H. Goodman; Brad Caleb Kane
- Production code: 3T7661
- Original air date: January 27, 2009

Guest appearances
- Chris Bauer as Brian Dempsey; Michael Gaston as Sanford Harris; Ari Graynor as Rachel Dunham; Lily Pilblad as Ella Blake; Mary Beth Peil as Jessica Warren; Noah Fleiss as Luke Dempsey; Gbenga Akinnagbe as Akim; Susan Elaine Knight as Cynthia Wiles; Mark Lotito as Paul Wiles; Jake O'Connor as Gregory Wiles; Michael Cerveris as the Observer

Episode chronology
← Previous "Bound"	Next → "The Transformation"
- Fringe season 1

"The No-Brainer" is the twelfth episode of the first season of the American science fiction drama television series Fringe. The episode was written by David H. Goodman and Brad Caleb Kane, and it was directed by John Polson.

It first aired in the United States on January 27, 2009, on the Fox Broadcasting Company.

== Plot ==
The core trio of the Fringe department—Olivia, Walter, and Peter—investigate the death of a teenager whose brain has been liquefied after watching a video sent to his computer. A car salesman and a stepfather are targeted next and become part of the investigation. All of the victims are connected to a disgruntled high-level computer programmer (Chris Bauer) who has lost his job and whose whereabouts are unknown. The murderer then sends the video to Olivia's laptop and almost kills her niece Ella, but Olivia bursts into the apartment and is able to intervene. In order to catch the suspect, Olivia defies an order from Agent Harris; she allows the programmer's son to be released in order to track him. Broyles puts his friendship with Harris on the line to defend her.

== Production ==
The episode was co-written by co-executive producer David H. Goodman and co-producer Brad Caleb Kane; it was Goodman's fourth of six episodes he wrote for the series, and Kane's second of three. It was directed by John Polson, his only directing credit for the series.

To achieve the effect of the arm reaching through the computer monitor, an actor wore a green screen sleeve on his arm and reached through the computer monitor which had also been fitted with a green background. In post-production, visual effects supervisor Jay Worth replaced the green portions with a computer generated animated arm that interacted with the character on-screen. One crew member commented that rather than use all special effects, they wanted to "get the articulation of an actual arm. We get the physicality which is pretty hard to fake of a hand striking somebody, so that helps us sell that contact."

== Reception ==
=== Ratings ===
"The No-Brainer" was first broadcast on the Fox network in the United States on January 27, 2009. It was watched by an estimated 11.62 million viewers, an improvement over the season's episode average of 8.8 million.

=== Reviews ===
The episode received average reviews from television critics. Noel Murray of The A.V. Club commented on how familiar the episode felt to others, and that it was a step back from the previous episodes in terms of quality. He did however like the opening sequence of the episode, and scene involving Olivia running back to her apartment to save her niece from looking at the computer monitor. He said, "I was literally yelling at my screen all through the latter scene", and "It's that kind of offbeat action that has me enjoying this show more and more." He ultimately gave the episode a "B" grade.

IGN's Ramsey Isler gave it a similar review, calling the episode "passable," "average," and "decent". He also noted the episode was a step backwards after the two-part episode "Safe" and "Bound". Isler was negative about the character Sanford Harris, calling him a "stereotypical, completely unlikable villain", and that his character "is dragging the show down". Positive comments about the episode included Walter's comic relief, and the end of the episode which included a flirty moment between Peter and Olivia's sister. He gave the episode a 7 out of 10.
