= Power Hungry (Fringe) =

- Fringe episode
- Meegar causes a transformer to explode. To simulate this, the crew filled a fuse box with "sparking devices" and triggered an explosion.
- Episode no.: Season 1 Episode 5
- Directed by: Christopher Misiano
- Written by: Julia Cho; Jason Cahill
- Production code: 3T7654
- Original air date: October 14, 2008

Guest appearances
- Ebon Moss-Bachrach as Joseph Meegar; Max Baker as Jacob Fischer; Marylouise Burke as Flora Meegar; Diane Davis as Bethany; Michael Cerveris as the Observer

Episode chronology
← Previous "The Arrival"	Next → "The Cure"
- Fringe season 1

"Power Hungry" is the fifth episode of the first season of the American science fiction drama television series Fringe. The episode was written by playwright Julia Cho and consulting producer Jason Cahill, and was directed by Christopher Misiano. The episode focuses on Fringe Division's efforts in finding a man with the uncontrolled ability to affect electrical energy, thanks to the work of a wanted rogue scientist. Meanwhile, Olivia Dunham (Anna Torv) sees visions of her deceased lover, John Scott (Mark Valley).

The episode's premise began with the idea of a computer virus being able to spread to humans, which then evolved into the story of a man who comes into his unique abilities. Series consultant Glen Whitman noted the premise was based on the "very very weak magnetic field" of electrical energy surrounding humans that an EEG detects, and the writers simply amplified this. The special effects crew undertook much preparation to simulate a chase sequence involving an exploding transformer, leading guest actor Ebon Moss-Bachrach to note how scary the effect was to film.

It first aired in the United States on October 14, 2008 on the Fox network, and was seen by an estimated 9.157 million American viewers, the network's second-highest-rated show for the week. Critical reactions of the episode ranged from mixed to positive, as many believed the series was finally finding its footing. Others, however, critiqued the episode for seeming too ordinary for a science fiction series.

== Plot ==
Joseph Meegar (Ebon Moss-Bachrach), a shy delivery boy who lives with his mother (Marylouise Burke), arrives late for work and delivers a package to an office building where he comes across Bethany (Diane Davis), a receptionist with whom he's infatuated. Afterward, while in an elevator, Bethany notices Meegar has pictures of her on his cell phone. Meegar's angst then apparently causes the elevator to fall to the underground parking lot levels, killing all but Meegar. He is able to walk away unharmed, but is then startled as all the car alarms go off around him.

Olivia reveals to Charlie Francis (Kirk Acevedo) her encounter with her deceased lover John Scott (in the previous episode). She, Peter (Joshua Jackson), and Walter Bishop (John Noble) arrive at the scene, where they determine that the deceased were electrocuted before the impact, and that the elevator did not fall, but drove down. Furthermore, Walter detects electromagnetic energy in the area. Meanwhile, Meegar inadvertently causes a packaging machine to malfunction, severely injuring his boss right after Meegar is fired. He later reveals to his mother that some time ago he answered a magazine advertisement promising to "unlock [his] hidden potential", and although he has no knowledge of what has been done to him, he believes that what he has done was a result of being experimented on. A further panicked Meegar then causes his mother's pacemaker to fail, and she dies.

The team becomes aware that a human has the uncontrolled ability to affect electrical energy, made this way by Jacob Fischer (Max Baker). Fischer is a rogue scientist wanted by Interpol, who experimented on humans by luring his victims through bogus ads. Olivia continues to encounter John Scott, who promises her that he does love her, and will prove it. Through him, Olivia realizes that someone survived the elevator impact. Now aware of Meegar's identity, they attempt to track him. However, Meegar is captured by Fischer who wishes to perform further tests on him. Walter finds Meegar's Walkman and uses its cassette tape to find a unique electromagnetic signature, then has homing pigeons guide Olivia, Peter, and Charlie to his location. Alerted by the FBI's arrival, Fischer attempts to leave with Meegar, who escapes. After Fischer is apprehended, Meegar attempts to flee, but he's also caught. They send Meegar to a hospital to be examined.

Walter realizes Olivia is seeing Scott, and reveals she's not hallucinating. He theorizes that when both minds were linked during Scott's coma (in "Pilot"), a part of Scott's consciousness has embedded itself within hers. Later, while driving home, she spots Scott again. He leads her to a basement where Scott has been running his own Pattern-related investigations. Phillip Broyles (Lance Reddick) hands Olivia some of Scott's personal effects. Among them she finds an engagement ring, proving Scott's claim to have loved her.

== Production ==
"Power Hungry" was written by consulting producer Jason Cahill and playwright Julia Cho, each of which would go on to write other first season episodes. Christopher Misiano directed the installment. According to Fringe co-creator Roberto Orci, series writers often approached episodes' fringe cases by coming up with an idea and then asking science consultants to "justify it scientifically." For "Power Hungry", Cho and others brainstormed the concept of a computer virus being able to spread to humans. She explained, "And through kneading that idea over and over again, we came up with the idea of a character, Joseph, who would start waking up to this power of his to be able to actually control electronic- or computer-driven devices." New Media consultant and scientist Glen Whitman, who later co-wrote some Fringe episodes, noted that the science depicted in the episode was not totally impossible. "It is true that human beings as a result of the electrical activity in our brains, we do all have a very very weak magnetic field around our heads," he said. "And that's in part what is sensed by an EEG. So the notion was, 'how can you amplify that'"?

The chase scene involving Joseph and Olivia required much preparation, as the crew had to simulate an exploding transformer. Special effects coordinator Conrad Brink used a "mechanical trip" to support an electrical cable, which he then strung to the other side of the adjacent road using a pole. The crew filled the fuse box with "sparking devices", meant to give the appearance of an exploding transformer and power lines. Demonstrating this, Brink noted, "What happens is the panel cover will blow off, sparks will come out, the cable will go up, sparking down to the ground." Misiano said of the sequence, "This young man runs by an electrical box and it blows up. It really blew!" The director added that guest actor Ebon Moss-Bachrach later told him, "that was actually really scary" to film. After he filmed his character hitting Joseph with a crow bar, actor Joshua Jackson joked, "Finally I'm going to get a little respect on this set."

Mark Valley returns as John Scott. The actor stated that despite the character's death in the pilot; "I'm going to be showing up in the first season. And, for a guy who died in the pilot, I consider myself pretty fortunate." Actors who guest star in the episode include Ebon Moss-Bachrach as Joseph Meegar, Max Baker as Jacob Fischer, and Marylouise Burke as Flora Meegar. The first season DVD contains a deleted scene of Olivia and Peter picking up the homing pigeons from a friend of his named Tony. Tony quietly mentions to Peter that his sister could use Peter's help, but when asked, Peter refuses to tell Olivia more of the story.

== Reception ==
=== Ratings ===
"Power Hungry" first broadcast on the Fox network in the United States on October 14, 2008. It was watched by 9.157 million viewers, Fox's second highest rated show for the week. It also earned a 4.2/10 ratings share among adults aged 18 to 49, meaning that it was seen by 4.2 percent of all 18- to 49-year-olds, and 10 percent of all 18- to 49-year-olds watching television at the time of broadcast. With time shifted ratings taken into account, viewership rose to 11.05 million seven days after original broadcast.

=== Reviews ===
"My respect for Fringe grows by the week. Following last episode's introduction of the Observer and the subsequent realization that the character has been with the series from the beginning, we're finally beginning to understand exactly what this Pattern is everyone's talking about."

— Los Angeles Times reviewer Patrick Kevin Day

Critical reactions of the episode ranged from mixed to positive. Travis Fickett of IGN rated the episode 6.8/10, stating that although it was "perfectly serviceable, professionally produced television," it was "much like the last week with a little bit of been-there-done-that conspiracy stuff thrown on top of it," and that the plot was "almost boilerplate for this genre." By this point in the series, the reviewer believed that "the thing about Fringe that is holding it back is that you're always ahead of it. The show needs to change things up." Bryant L. Griffin of Airlock Alpha, opined; "Though not the show's best hour to date, 'Power Hungry' is still a solid entry. Good directing, writing, and outstanding production values are maintained as the series' norm." In addition Griffin enjoyed Fischer's "casual surrender", as "in the past, those associated with 'the pattern' exhibited a fevered desire to avoid capture, going as far as committing suicide. What's this guy's deal? He obviously has a plan." However the reviewer was skeptical as to why Astrid was comfortable working with Walter again, considering he subdued her in the previous episode.

Los Angeles Times reviewer Patrick Kevin Day stated that at this point in the series, he "initially fretted that Fringe would never grow beyond a run-of-the-mill "X-Files" knock-off," but now saw the creators' intentions. Sarah Stegall of SFScope called the episode an homage to X-Files episode "D.P.O.", whose featured character has a similar premise to Meegar. Stegall admitted that "this show is growing on me," with the same atmosphere as The X-Files "coupled with a slightly better grounding in actual science." Erin Dougherty of CinemaBlend reacted positively towards the episode, commending it as it "bounced back so quickly from that lame silver cylinder episode or they would've lost me forever." Dougherty also felt that the three protagonists, Olivia, Walter and Peter, "are becoming much more believable characters." Noel Murray of The A.V. Club rated the episode a B−, opining that the cold open was the series' best since the pilot, but added that "despite the added [Freak of the Week] sympathy, 'Power Hungry' promptly peters out, because the level of oddity required for Walter and the Pattern Team to track the Freak down isn't especially high." Murray added that the return of Scott and his scenes with Olivia "serves to string along the home viewer, inviting us to question whether Olivia's playing for the right team in this whole Pattern game." Television Without Pity meanwhile, graded the episode with an A−.
