= The Dreamscape =

- Fringe episode
- Mark Young (Ptolemy Slocum) is assaulted by butterflies in the opening scene.
- Episode no.: Season 1 Episode 9
- Directed by: Fred Toye
- Written by: Julia Cho; Zack Whedon
- Production code: 3T7658
- Original air date: November 25, 2008

Guest appearances
- Yul Vazquez as George Morales; Susan Misner as Tess Amaral; Ptolemy Slocum as Mark Young; David Vadim as Michael Kelly; Tom Riis Farrell as Gregory Woth; Cindy Katz as Charlotte; Catia Ojeda as Melanie; Robert Arcaro as Brian Cole; Harry Sutton Jr as Paul; Carlo Alban as FBI tech agent; Diane Zaremba as Nurse; Michael Cerveris as the Observer; Jacqueline Beaulieu as Nina's assistant

Episode chronology
← Previous "The Equation"	Next → "Safe"
- Fringe season 1

"The Dreamscape" is the ninth episode of the first season of the American science fiction drama television series Fringe. It centers on a Fringe investigation of a Massive Dynamic employee who, after believing himself to be under attack by a swarm of sharp-winged butterflies, jumps out of a window. Meanwhile, Olivia (Anna Torv) continues her visions of the deceased John Scott (Mark Valley), and discovers how he is related to a deadly psychoactive drug synthesized by Massive Dynamic.

"The Dreamscape" was written by series staff writers Julia Cho and Zack Whedon, and was directed by Fred Toye. To create the opening scene, they "relied entirely on actor performance," with guest actor Ptolemy Slocum simulating being cut, freezing for the crew to apply prosthetic make-up, and then unfreezing to continue shooting the scene. VFX coordinator Christopher Stollard wished the computer-generated butterflies to look as realistic as possible, and modeled them after mounted butterfly specimens his team studied.

The episode first aired in the United States on November 25, 2008 on the Fox network. It was watched by an estimated 8.73 million viewers and earned a 3.9/10 ratings share among adults aged 18 to 49. Reviews of the episode were mixed, with one reviewer believing it "certainly moves [the series] in the right direction".

== Plot ==
Massive Dynamic executive Mark Young (Ptolemy Slocum) delivers a presentation at the company’s Manhattan office. When he is done and the other attendees have left, he sees an unusual butterfly. Upon picking it up, he experiences a cut on his hand and is then attacked by a swarm. Mark jumps out of a window, to his death. Olivia Dunham (Anna Torv), despite preparing to go out to dinner with her sister, instead agrees to Phillip Broyles' (Lance Reddick) demand that she join the Fringe team's investigation at the scene. While examining the body, Dr. Walter Bishop (John Noble) sees lacerations on Young’s skin and notes a lack of corresponding tears on his shirt. At the scene, Olivia has a brief vision of her deceased lover John Scott (Mark Valley) watching them, which troubles her.

Later, in the lab at Harvard, Walter's autopsy reveals a synthetic compound in Mark's blood, though any link to the cuts is not yet known to them. Olivia receives an email from someone who claims to be John Scott, listing an address for her to visit. Upon arriving she finds boxes, one of which contains a group of toads. At the lab, Walter finds that the toads contain a "psychoactive compound", a hallucinogen that affects the fear center of the brain. They conclude that Mark’s brain was so convinced of something happening to his body that actual physical marks appeared. Mark was infected with a large dosage, leading them to attribute his death to murder.

Olivia admits to Walter how she found the address and learns that her brain still contains some of John's memories. Wishing to discover what else John knew and prevent any further visions from occurring, Olivia insists on returning to Walter’s sensory deprivation tank. Inside the tank, Olivia sees a memory of John in a restaurant. Despite Walter's vehement protest that it is impossible, Olivia is convinced that John Scott saw her. Afterward, she sees John meeting with Mark and two other unidentified men. After Mark and another man leave, John kills the other man. Olivia believes the group were looking to sell the compound as a street drug, and she's able to track down the other man, George Morales (Yul Vazquez). Once apprehended, he denies killing Mark and demands immunity and protection from Massive Dynamic, who he believes was responsible for Mark's death as well as other recent fringe events. Olivia confronts Nina Sharp (Blair Brown) about her suspicions, but George is murdered before he can be of further help to them. Later that night, Olivia gets another email from John Scott simply saying, "I SAW YOU. IN THE RESTAURANT."

Meanwhile, Peter (Joshua Jackson) is contacted by Tess (Susan Misner), a woman from his past who warns him to leave Boston. When he meets her, Peter intuits that she is being abused by her boyfriend Michael (David Vadim). He ambushes Michael and warns him not to touch Tess again. Michael then informs local crime boss Worth (Tom Riis Farrell) that Peter is back in town.

== Production ==
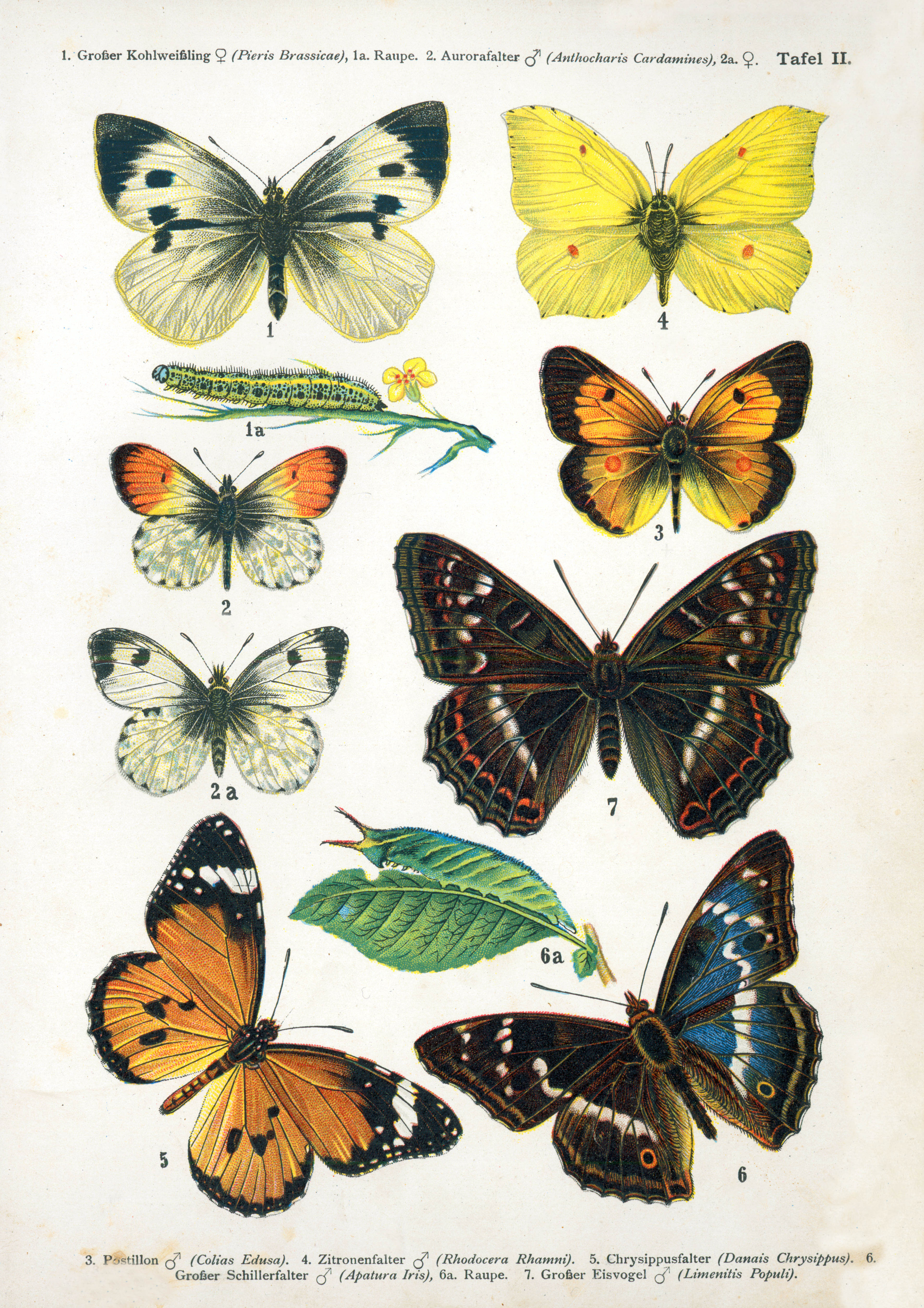
Olivia finds a display of butterfly specimens similar to this one in Young's apartment.

"The Dreamscape", the season's ninth episode, was co-written by staff writer Zack Whedon and playwright Julia Cho. It was Whedon's first contribution to the series, and Cho's second. In an interview fifteen days before the broadcast of "The Dreamscape", showrunner and executive producer Jeff Pinkner stated that it and several surrounding episodes would be "stand-alone in quality, but at the same time we [will] start to peel back another layer of the onion" to transition the second half of the season into a "new chapter." Anna Torv later commented that she wished for Olivia to "lighten up" during the first season, "but every time she did, something would happen." The writers inputted small scenes to shine more light on her character, which included Olivia dressing up for a night out but then "the phone rings. It’s Broyles, and she wipes the lipstick off, puts on a coat, and goes out. That’s it. You’re on call. She breaks my heart."

Fred Toye served as the episode director, his second after directing "The Ghost Network" six installments earlier. To create the opening scene of character Mark Young being "attacked" by butterflies, Toye shot it in multiple phases. Series co-creator Roberto Orci preferred the opening scene to involve a "more subtle" death, so Young was made to die from falling out a window, which was "a real thing, something that's not imagined or whimsical". VFX coordinator Christopher Stollard stated that his crew "relied entirely on actor performance," with guest actor Ptolemy Slocum communicating often with the crew during filming. He shot his scenes in short bursts. Slocum summarized that he "would experience the [butterfly] cut and then we would freeze, apply make-up [to create the cut on his skin], and then unfreeze and move on" filming. On his first day, Slocum stated that he wore more than 75 individual prosthetics over his entire chest and arms.

Stollard wished the butterflies to be as realistic as possible, and modeled them after mounted butterfly specimens his team studied. The butterflies were computer generated animations and added later in post-production. To create the illusion of Young falling through the window, the visual effects crew placed small explosive charges on the tempered glass window; Slocum's stuntman Jared Burke then jumped through while they triggered the glass to explode. Two cameras, one high and one profile, were positioned to shoot the fall, and were composited together later into a matte painting of the World Trade Building. The fall was filmed multiple times with a green screen, with the stuntman falling on a cushion. While on-set, Toye explained of the shoot, "with all the pieces put together with the visual effects and with the performance we got with our actor Ptolemy, it's going to be fabulous." A crewman believed that the addition of music to Young's fall made the scene "far more elegant and more of a statement." In a December 2012 interview, actress Jasika Nicole stated that she developed a fear of butterflies as a result of this episode.

== Reception ==
=== Ratings and marketing ===
"The Dreamscape" first aired on November 25, 2008 in the United States on the Fox network. With its timeslot dominated by the Dancing With the Stars season finale, Fringe attracted an estimated 8.73 million viewers, down from the previous week's audience of 9.36 million. This placed it in third place in its timeslot, behind The Mentalist. The episode also came in third place among viewers aged 18–49, as it earned a 3.9/10 ratings share; this means that it was seen by 3.9 percent of all 18- to 49-year-olds, and 10 percent of all 18- to 49-year-olds watching television at the time of broadcast.

Fringe's marketing team designed and launched www.massivedynamic.com near the beginning of the first season. Parts of the website can be seen in "The Dreamscape", including on Olivia's computer as she researches the company.

=== Reviews ===
Noel Murray of The A.V. Club was generally favorable to the episode, giving it a B+. He wrote, "Much like Fringe fan favorite 'The Arrival' (not a favorite of mine, sorry to say), 'The Dreamscape' is an episode more involved with insinuation and mythology-building than with telling a complete-in-one story. But perhaps because I've come to trust Fringe more over its recent run of entertaining episodes, I enjoyed it fairly well, and found myself trying to figure out what kind of thematic connections I could make using the notion of the body reacting to mere thoughts." Travis Fickett of IGN rated the episode 7.8/10, explaining that it "certainly moves in the right direction". Fickett found the "coolest moment" to be when Olivia witnesses John Scott's memory, and he also appreciated Peter's backstory ("It's more than Peter usually gets, but what we know isn't much and isn't very exciting."). Fickett criticized Olivia however for leaving the man at the hospital unsuitably protected.

"This is another solid episode of a show still trying to find its legs. The opening scene of the guy falling is money well spent – everything looks and sounds impressive as always. It's fun to see a bit of Olivia's personal life (the show needs more of this...) and the hint at a deeper story for Peter."

— IGN writer Travis Fickett

SFScope reviewer Sarah Stegall enjoyed Peter's sideplot and hoped to learn more of his past, but thought the "cute in-jokes" were meant to distract the audience from a "thin" plot "full of holes". She added that "the shallow, cookie-cutter plotting" was starting to annoy her, and noted that while the series had the potential to become "a breakout show like The X-Files or Lost... its major weakness is the continual reliance on the worn-out cliché of the Big Bad Corporation," which had become "stale and dry."

Jane Boursaw of AOL's TV Squad wrote, "Another great episode tonight, and some of the little symbols we see leading into commercials were actually in tonight's episode," referring specifically to the hallucinatory butterflies and the frogs/toads found in the basement. Andrew Hanson of the Los Angeles Times took notice here of the pattern of Easter eggs teasing the next episode of the series. This feature of the show had earlier been touched on in an interview with showrunner Jeff Pinkner. As an example, the previous episode "The Equation" had contained a shot of a butterfly on a trashcan, foreshadowing the hallucinated butterfly attack in this episode.

In a 2016 retrospective of the series, The A.V. Club writer Joshua Alston considered "The Dreamscape" as a strong example of Fringe's "monster of the week" episodes that predominated the first season, showing "how much effort and imagination went into the self-contained stories".
