= Chance Kelly =

American actor (born 1967)

- Born: January 28, 1967 (age 59); Armonk, New York
- Education: New York University, Columbia University
- Occupation: Actor
- Years active: 1995–present
- Known for: Generation Kill, Fringe
- Spouse: Susan A Sanchez (1997)
- Children: 3

Chance Kelly (born December 25, 1967) is an American film and television actor who portrayed National Football League coach Mike Martz in the 2021 film American Underdog. He is also known for playing detective Ed Cutler on the NBC series Aquarius, Lt. Col. Stephen "Godfather" Ferrando in the 2008 HBO miniseries Generation Kill, Mitchell Loeb in the Fox television series Fringe, and Randall Watts in the Cinemax television series Banshee.

== Early life ==
After playing football at Ithaca College, Kelly transferred to New York University where he earned a BA in English and Writing, with the intention of pursuing a career as a writer. But, after losing a bet and in spite of a profound fear of public speaking, he entered an acting class. He was so terrified that he gave his first monologue (Brick from Cat on a Hot Tin Roof) to a brick wall.

== Career ==
While pursuing his acting career, Chance also entered the amateur boxing circuit in NYC, winning the super heavyweight division of the NYC Metros tournament. The following year, he entered the NYC Golden Gloves, winning his first fight by knockout, only to have to subsequently drop out of the competition for work on the film The Devil's Own.

In 2007, he played Lt. Col. Stephen "Godfather" Ferrando in HBO's Generation Kill. After reading the book upon which the adaptation was based, Kelly embarked on a five-month shoot in Africa, from May to December 2007. He also developed a unique, raspy voice for the role. The Boston Globe praised the "fierce edge" Kelly's performance brought to the series, opining, "Godfather leads with the competitive fury of a high school football coach. His eyes are cold fire, and Kelly, like a few other members of this cast, deserves notice at Emmy time next year." On Memorial Day 2009, he was appointed Honorary Marine by the Marine Corps League (Cpl. Philip A. Reynolds Detachment - 203, Freehold, New Jersey) for his work in Generation Kill.

Kelly appeared in the first season of the science fiction series Fringe as Agent Mitchell Loeb, beginning with the episode "In Which We Meet Mr. Jones". He portrayed Bart McDade, President and COO of Lehman Brothers, in the HBO film Too Big to Fail. Kelly appears as a mysterious interrogator in the American television series Homeland. He has also played recurring characters on For Life (ABC), Power (Starz), Banshee (Cinemax), House of Cards (Netflix), Legends (TNT), Hostages (CBS), Army Wives, The Whole Truth, Delocated, Rescue Me, and The Black Donnellys. Additionally, he has also guest starred on The Blacklist (NBC), Alpha House (Amazon), Motive, Nikita, Burn Notice & The Jury, NYC 22, Blue Bloods, Unforgettable, Body of Proof, Ray Donovan, Golden Boy, and Blindspot. He played the disturbing "Orange Suit Man" in M. Night Shyamalan's film Unbreakable. He has also appeared in the feature films American Sniper, Little Children, The Taking of Pelham 123, Stake Land, and Broken City.

Kelly has the singular honor of portraying nine different characters on nine different Law & Order episodes over a quarter century: Court Officer #1 (Law & Order: Criminal Intent episode #115 "Semi Professional" 2002); Det. Finch (Law & Order: Criminal Intent episode #318 "Ill Bred" 2004); Kyle Marsden (Law & Order: episode #1503 "The Brotherhood" 2004); Fireman Charlie Hugo (Law & Order: Criminal Intent episode #604 "Maltese Cross" 2006); State Trooper Lawley (Law & Order: SVU episode #819 "Florida" 2007); Elvis Howell (Law & Order: Criminal Intent episode #910 "Disciple" 2010); and Sergeant Forde (Law & Order: Los Angeles episode #113 "Reseda" 2011). In 2022 he played Duke Baker (Law & Order: SVU episode #2312 "Tommy Bakers Hardest Fight" 2022). In 2026 he portrayed Navy Admiral Rustin Garvey (Law & Order episode #2521, "Liberty".)

Chance portrayed Coach Mike Martz in the feature film American Underdog: The Kurt Warner Story Martz was the Offensive Coordinator responsible for "The Greatest Show on Turf" via which un-drafted free agent quarterback Kurt Warner led the Rams to a Super Bowl victory in Super Bowl XXXIV his first year with the team. Warner is the only un-drafted player to win either the league MVP or the Super Bowl MVP. Warner won both that same year.

Chance's podcast ISLAND ISLAND illustrates the incredible first 300 years of colonization in and around Manhattan island. The program covers 1609-1909 "Hudson to Hearst" and is available on Apple Podcasts, Spotify, Google, Pandora and Stitcher, among others: Island Podcast | Manhattan Island exploration Chance also produces History is Cool™ on YouTube an exploration of a variety of historical topics, including the incredible history of Manhattan Island.

== Personal life ==
Chance Kelly's maternal grandfather was screenwriter William Fay (Kid Galahad, Alfred Hitchcock Presents, Schlitz Playhouse).

Chance Kelly's great, great, great uncle was Honest John Kelly. John Kelly was the first Catholic elected in U.S. Congress in 1856. He would go on to be Sheriff of New York, and would subsequently take over and re-organize Tammany Hall in the wake of the Boss Tweed era. John Kelly was a fierce defender of the rights of New York immigrants from all parts of the world. He is entombed beneath the Basilica of Old St. Patrick's Cathedral on Mulberry Street in NYC, where he and the venerable Pierre Toussaint were fellow parishioners. Chance is currently producing a documentary on this John Kelly.

Chance Kelly holds a BA from New York University and an MS from Columbia University.

== Filmography ==
=== Film ===
Year	Title	Role	Notes
1997	The Devil's Own	Masked Burglar	
1998	Crossfire	Bodyguard	
1999	Puppet	Igor	
2000	Unbreakable	Orange Suit Man	
2001	L.I.E.	Prison Guard	
2002	Far From Heaven	Tallman	
2006	The Departed	Exam Instructor	
2009	The Taking of Pelham 123	ESU Captain	
2010	Stake Land	Officer Hurley	
2011	Too Big to Fail	Bart McDade	
2012	You're Nobody 'til Somebody Kills You	L. T. Harrington	
2013	Broken City	Murdock	
2014	Teenage Mutant Ninja Turtles	Mr. Rivetti	
2014	American Sniper	Lt. Colonel Jones	
2015	Stealing Cars	Coach Jimmy Carmichael	
2016	Deuces	Lieutenant Henderson	
2018	Beyond the Night	Bernie Coleman	
2019	Gutterbee	Sheriff T.J. Brown	
2021	American Underdog	Mike Martz	
2025	A House of Dynamite	Chairman of the Joint Chiefs	

=== Television ===
Year	Title	Role	Notes
1995	New York News	Unidentified Bruin	Episode: "The Using Game"
1995–1997	New York Undercover	Gary / Big Hog	Episodes: "Brotherhood" and "No Place Like Hell"
1999	The Sopranos	Fed #3	Episode: "Nobody Knows Anything"
2002–2010	Law & Order: Criminal Intent	Court Officer #1 / Detective Finch / Charlie Hugo / Elvis Howell	4 episodes
2004	Law & Order	Kyle Marsden	Episode: "The Brotherhood"
2006	The Unit	Commander Shelov	Episode: "Bait"
2007	Law & Order: Special Victims Unit	State Trooper Lawley	Episode: "Florida"
2007	Burn Notice	Vincent	Episode: "Pilot"
2008–2009	Fringe	Mitchell Loeb	5 episodes
2008	Generation Kill	Lt. Colonel Stephen "Godfather" Ferrando	7 episodes Television miniseries
2011	Law & Order: LA	Sergeant Fordes	Episode: "Reseda"
2011	Unforgettable	Aaron Logan	Episode: "Road Block"
2012	Blue Bloods	Dillon Carney	Episode: "Some Kind of Hero"
2012	Nikita	Wade	Episode: "Innocence"
2012–2013	Homeland	Mitchell Clawson	2 episodes
2013	House of Cards	Steve	3 episodes
2013	The Blacklist	General Daniel Ryker	Episode: "Pilot"
2014–2016	Power	Dean Collins	5 episodes
2015–2016	Aquarius	Detective Ed Cutler	23 episodes
2016	Netflix Presents: The Characters	Detective Salters	Episode: "Paul W. Downs"
2016	Banshee	Randall Watts	3 episodes
2016	Luke Cage	Albert Rackham	Episode: "Step in the Arena"
2016	Bull	Detective Murphy	Episode: "Just Tell the Truth"
2017	Neon Joe, Werewolf Hunter	Colonel Daggart	Episode: "Walk Away, Friend. Walk Away"
2017	Wormwood	Wet Works #2	2 episodes Television miniseries
2018	Blindspot	Nils Bresden	Episode: "Two Legendary Chums"
2018–2019	Ray Donovan	Vinny	3 episodes
2018	Chicago Fire	Special Agent Reardon	Episode: "When They See Us Coming"
2019–2022	Billions	Ken Shaddock	3 episodes
2019	God Friended Me	Fire Capt. Murphy	Episode: "High Anxiety"
2020	For Life	Cyrus Hunt	4 episodes
2022	Law & Order: Special Victims Unit	Duke Baker	Episode: "Tommy Baker's Hardest Fight"
2022	FBI	FBI ADIC Hawkins	Episode: "Face Off"
2022	The Equalizer	Fire Captain Sanders	Episode: "Where There's Smoke"
2026	Law & Order	Admiral Rusten Garvey	Episode: "Liberty"

=== Video games ===
Year	Title	Role	Notes
2011	Homefront	Commander Bradley (voice)	
