= In Which We Meet Mr. Jones =

- Fringe episode
- Episode no.: Season 1 Episode 7
- Directed by: Brad Anderson
- Written by: J. J. Abrams; Jeff Pinkner
- Production code: 3T7656
- Original air date: November 11, 2008
- Running time: 50 minutes

Guest appearances
- Chance Kelly as Mitchell Loeb; Trini Alvarado as Samantha Loeb; Jared Harris as David Robert Jones; Billy Burke as Lucas Vogel; Kenneth Tigar as Johan Lennox; Lars Gerhard as Guard; Ian McLaughlin as Joseph Smith; Paul Urcioli as Doctor; Guiesseppe Jones as FBI Agent; Cindy Cheung as Nurse #2; Michael Cerveris as the Observer

Episode chronology
← Previous "The Cure"	Next → "The Equation"
- Fringe season 1

"In Which We Meet Mr. Jones" is the seventh episode of the first season of the American science fiction drama television series Fringe. The story begins when an FBI agent collapses from a parasite constricting his heart, and Olivia must meet with biochemist David Robert Jones (Jared Harris) in Frankfurt in order to find a cure. It featured the first appearance by Harris.

The episode was written by J. J. Abrams and Jeff Pinkner, and directed by Brad Anderson. The writers designed it to serve as the foundation for the "next chapter" in the season's narrative.

It first aired in the United States on November 11, 2008 on the Fox network to an estimated 8.61 million viewers. Reviews of the episode were mostly mixed.

== Plot ==
Agent Mitchell Loeb (Chance Kelly), a friend of Broyles (Lance Reddick), is on a group mission in Weymouth, Massachusetts but fails to find evidence of wrongdoing in a truck they targeted. Loeb and Broyles are in a meeting afterwards when Loeb collapses, seemingly of a heart attack or seizure. He is rushed to the hospital, where the medical staff cut open his chest, only to find his heart is being constricted by a synthetic rhizocephalan-like parasite. The Fringe division of Olivia, Walter, and Peter are briefed by Broyles, who then shows them the hospitalized Loeb.

At Harvard, the Bishops run tests on Loeb while Olivia talks with Loeb's wife Samantha (Trini Alvarado). Not recognizing the parasite, Walter pokes it with a blade in an attempt to remove it, and it constricts tighter around Loeb's heart, further endangering his life. Walter is able to get a tissue sample, while Peter administers some medicine to calm Loeb's heart. After a DNA analysis, Walter discovers a pattern "too organized to be accidental, too perfect to be natural." Astrid thinks it is a Caesar cipher, and she and Olivia decipher the acronym "ZFT". After talking with Broyles, Olivia is directed to talk to David Robert Jones (Jared Harris), a biochemist being held incommunicado in "Wissenschaft Prison", Frankfurt, Germany ("Wissenschaft" is German for "science"). Broyles explains to her that ZFT are privately funded cells in 83 recorded countries that traffic in scientific progress, not weapons or drugs. Some fringe events in previous episodes may have been orchestrated by this group. He says little else is known.

Meanwhile, Peter and Walter discover the parasite has slowly worked its roots into Loeb's circulatory system and extended through the IV into the IV drip; they estimate Loeb has a day to live. After meeting with old friend Lucas Vogel (Billy Burke), Olivia is able to secure a meeting with Jones, who knows the cure to the parasite slowly killing Loeb. Charlie Francis (Kirk Acevedo) finds a sheet of code in Loeb's briefcase listing agents from their field office. They suspect another mole with access to high-level security clearances and tie it to a Joseph Smith, previously mentioned by Loeb as a suspected mole after the truck mission failure. Although she is not able to talk with Jones at first, he arranges for Olivia to be given a piece of paper with instructions demanding he first speak to Smith, a colleague of his, before he helps her. Smith is unfortunately killed soon after in a raid set up by Broyles. Walter, however, devises a way to wire Peter into the dead man's brain, enabling Peter to speak on his behalf without Jones knowing Smith is dead. Smith's "response" is "little hill," which is an answer Jones seems pleased to hear. Jones duly tells Olivia a formula for the parasite, and the subsequent procedure is successful. The parasite is removed, but the team does not realize that the entire incident was orchestrated by Loeb and his wife to get the information Peter extracted from Smith. The final scene shows Samantha Loeb whispering "little hill" into her husband's ear at the hospital.

== Production ==
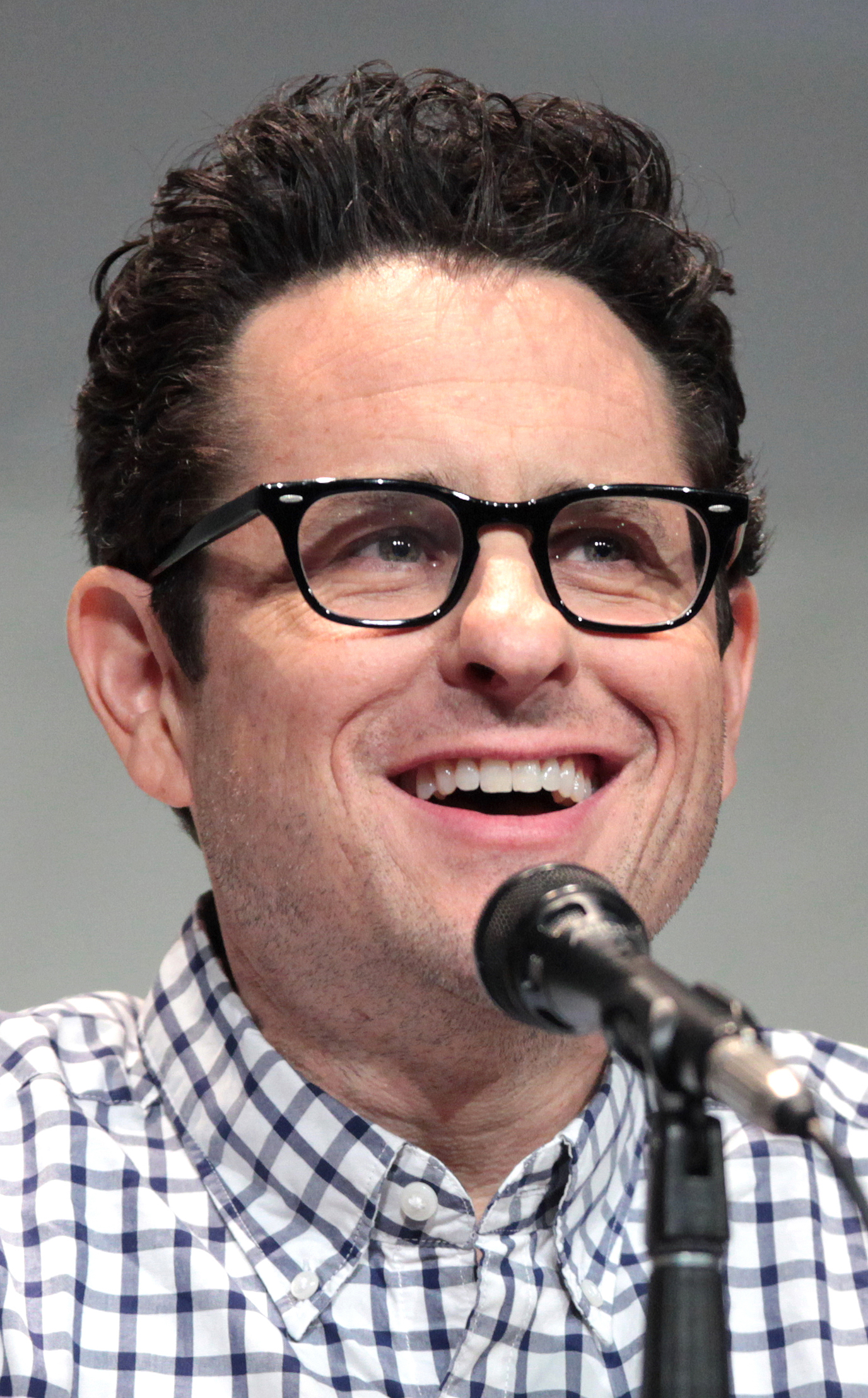
J. J. Abrams (pictured) co-wrote the episode with Jeff Pinkner.

Co-creator J. J. Abrams and executive producer Jeff Pinkner wrote the episode, and Brad Anderson directed it. Pinkner has stated that the first six episodes of season one served as a prologue, and that the following episodes, beginning with "In Which We Meet Mr. Jones", would be the "next chapter" in the story. Pinkner further described the episode as "foundational," as it will set up "a lot of things will be set up which will come to pay off over the next several weeks".

The character David Robert Jones is a reference to English musician David Bowie, who was born with that name. "In Which We Meet Mr. Jones" was the first appearance of the character. When actor Jared Harris was first cast for the part, he was told Jones was "possibly a major, important character", as indicated by the episode's title. Whether his character would make a reappearance later in the season depended on how well received Jones was by the show's audience, Harris' performance, and if the writers felt they had more to tell about the character. Harris later described Jones in a May 2009 interview, "I think you could sense that there was a great bit of ambiguity about the character which was useful. He's a bad guy that might be on the right side. He just might be fighting for the good guys. Those guys are always great parts because you leave the audience guessing about what side he's really on. He's one of those guys that if he's fighting for the right cause, he's a tremendous ally. But if he's fighting on the wrong cause, he's a formidable opponent. He's an anti-hero who is fighting for the just cause". Harris asserted in a February 2009 interview that he did not sign a recurring contract, meaning that the character was not meant to be permanent. He affirmed this by believing the character's personality rendered Jones incapable of joining the regular cast, "You'd have to keep [Jones] chained like a dog. You couldn't let him loose. You certainly couldn't let him use his hands. You know what the f--k he'd do".

The crew first considered making the parasite look like "an alien," but shifted away from that in favor of depicting it like an amoeba to be more familiar to the audience. CGI modeling followed, along with a physical model, which was then used by the CGI department to simulate it being wrapped around Loeb's heart. To create the actual, physical parasite, the crew used a prosthetic chest and CGI to create the parasite, and a pig torso was used when the doctors made the initial incision at the hospital.

During the scene where Broyles is talking with Mitchell Loeb, Mitchell mentions the words "Page 47". The number 47 bears a huge significance to another J. J. Abrams show, Alias. Moreover, the page 47 mentions the names of two agents, Coscarelli and Scrimm. Don Coscarelli is the director of the Phantasm franchise, of which Angus Scrimm is the main antagonist as the Tall Man.

== Reception ==
=== Ratings ===
The premiere of "In Which We Meet Mr. Jones" was watched by an estimated 8.61 million viewers in the United States. It received a 5.2/8 rating among all households.

=== Reviews ===
"It was a transformational episode of Fringe. It executed every aspect of character and story with clarity, found an infectiously hectic rhythm that we just couldn't help but dance to - like a pied pipers song"

— UGO Networks' Jon Lachonis

Travis Fickett of IGN disliked the episode, criticizing it as "sloppy," the science as "repeating itself," and the fringe element [the parasite] as "especially goofy"; he rated the episode 6.0/10. Writing for Mania.com, critic Stephen Lackey thought Anna Torv's performance "felt forced", but heaped praise on John Noble. Lackey believes Torv and Joshua Jackson have good chemistry, and consequently partly disliked the episode because they had few scenes together. He also thought the case of the week was "fairly entertaining," but the storyline was "just...passable", as he wanted the show "to be done with all of the introductions and get more into the mystery of the pattern". He concluded his review, "Hopefully, next week the story will be just a little more concise, Olivia and Peter back working together and maybe at some point Astrid will actually have something important to do". The Los Angeles Times thought the episode was "solid if unexceptional", as he liked Walter but disliked the "vacuum of personality" that is Astrid.

UGO Networks writer Jon Lachonis stated, "If you were on the fence before, [the episode] will drag you kicking and screaming into the dark world of Fringe's science wielding bogeymen. "In Which we Meet Mr. Jones" is what Fringe promised it would be from the beginning, a suspense driven procedural that probes deep into our technological phobias. With this new formulation of Fringe, we get the challenge of a sophisticated crime drama mixed with sad sack characters that tempt the everyman into the game, while blowing us away with a level of wordplay and pseudo science that CSI or Alias could only have dreamed of." The A.V. Club's Noel Murray enjoyed the episode, giving it a B+, while Television Without Pity gave the episode a B−.
