= The Bishop Revival =

- Fringe episode
- Episode no.: Season 2 Episode 14
- Directed by: Adam Davidson
- Written by: Glen Whitman; Robert Chiappetta
- Production code: 3X5113
- Original air date: January 28, 2010

Guest appearances
- Craig Robert Young as Alfred Hoffman; Clark Middleton as Edward Markham; Craig Anderson as George; Lauren Attadia as Amanda; Diana Bang as Nora; Aaron Brooks as Josh Staller; Robin Douglas as Lynn Arrendt; Magda Harout as Nana Staller; Dan Joffre as Detective Manning; Barbara Kottmeier as Shelley; Nancy Linari as Eliza Staller; John Macintyre as Young Usher; Alberta Mayne as Young Mother; Al Miro as Neal; Sierra Pitkin as Jordan; Leonard Tenisci as Harry Staller; Max Train as Eric Franko; Brendon Zub as David Staller

Episode chronology
← Previous "What Lies Below"	Next → "Jacksonville"
- Fringe season 2

"The Bishop Revival" is the 14th episode of the second season of the American science fiction drama television series Fringe. The episode's storyline follows Nazi scientist Alfred Hoffman (Craig Robert Young) as he specially designed airborne toxins to kill only surrounding people with similar genetic traits, such as people with brown eyes.

It was written by Glen Whitman and Robert Chiappetta, and directed by Adam Davidson. Along with Young and a number of small guest parts, the episode featured another guest appearance by Clark Middleton as rare book seller Edward Markham. "The Bishop Revival" first aired in the United States on January 28, 2010 on the Fox network to an estimated 9.153 million viewers. Critical reception for the episode ranged from positive to mixed, as reviewers were divided on the episode's villain.

== Plot ==
15 people suffocate at a Jewish wedding, appearing to have asphyxiated from the inside out. When the Fringe team arrives, Olivia (Anna Torv) identifies that all the victims were from the groom's side, whose grandmother was a Holocaust survivor - and Walter (John Noble) surmises that they were all killed via their shared genetic traits. Later, a similar mass death occurs at a coffee shop, in which Walter recognizes the victims all had brown eyes, another common genetic trait. From fingerprints found at the scene, they discover the culprit is Alfred Hoffman (Craig Robert Young), a Nazi scientist apparently somehow over 100 years old. Walter realizes that the man likely worked with his own father, Robert Bishoff (a German scientist who defected to the US in 1943 and anglicised his name), in creating a chemical agent that, once heated as a gas, could be used to target any specific trait using DNA from the target subject—especially those not of the master race. Though Walter originally had his father's files on the subject, his son Peter (Joshua Jackson), 10 years earlier, had sold them; Peter tries to recover the files but finds some have been used by an artist to create sensationalism art, causing Walter to become distraught.

They trace Hoffman to his home, finding his equipment used to create the chemical agent downstairs but no sign of Hoffman. Walter nearly suffocates from an agent left by Hoffman, but Olivia and Peter are able to save him in time. As the FBI search the premises, they find evidence that points to a convention being held to promote world equality. Olivia and Peter depart to try to find Hoffman, while Walter remains behind, examining Hoffman's equipment.

At the convention, Hoffman has replaced the heating elements for the chafing dishes with his own. Olivia and Peter struggle with locating Hoffman before Walter and Astrid (Jasika Nicole) arrive. Walter uses a fogger to distribute his own chemical agent, this time specific to Hoffman, and soon the man is found dying. As the team regroups, Walter fully admits to killing Hoffman, a crime in itself, but Broyles (Lance Reddick) decides to let Walter go. Later, Peter has been able to recover the rest of his grandfather's work and returns it to Walter; Walter then goes through the files, finding an old photo of his father and Hoffman working together.

== Production ==
"The Bishop Revival" was the third episode to be written by writing partners Glen Whitman and Robert Chiappetta. It was the only Fringe episode directed by Adam Davidson.

"The Bishop Revival" revealed that the seahorse shown in promotions since the series began was in fact a genetically encoded "signature" created by Walter's father Dr. Robert Bishop. In an interview after the episode's broadcast, consulting producer Akiva Goldsman cited "The Bishop Revival" when discussing the use of flashbacks in Fringe; he stated his disinclination to use too many flashbacks in the series, explaining "I think flashbacks are really useful and there are a couple of places where it will be useful. But fundamentally, no, I don't think we're a show that will be doing a lot of jumping back in time despite the single horde of calls for the 'Walter's Grandfather Nazi Hunting' series. I think not, but it was fun to do [in the 'Peter' episode]."

Guest stars for the episode included Craig Robert Young, Max Train, Sierra Pitkin, Brendon Zub, Barbara Kottmeier, John Macintyre, Lauren Attadia, Al Miro, Aaron Brooks, Magda Harout, Leonard Tenisci, Alberta Mayne, Nancy Linari, and Dan Joffre. Clark Middleton, who was last seen in the first-season episode "Ability", made his second guest appearance in "The Bishop Revival" as rare bookseller Edward Markham.

== Cultural references ==
The episode contained two pieces of music from the 19th century German composer Johannes Brahms: his Piano Quartet No. 1, Op.25 in G Major: III. Andante Con Moto-Animato and Piano Quartet No. 1, Op.25 in G Minor: II. Intermezzo: Allegro Ma Non Troppo-Trio: Animato. Also in the episode, someone is seen holding a Dharma Initiative tea bag, a reference to the mysterious organization on the science fiction series Lost.

The Nazi in this episode appears to be Reichsführer of the Schutzstaffel, Heinrich Himmler. Aside from resembling the character, Himmler was also both a Nordicist and a Nazi Occultist. At one point in the episode, a scared elderly woman points at him screaming, "It's him... it's him...!" This has a double meaning, as she could have been saying "It's him!" or she could have been trying to say "It's Himmler!"

== Reception ==
=== Ratings ===
In a Thursday night filled mostly with repeats, Fox's airing of new episodes Bones and Fringe finished #1 among adults aged 18–49, with an estimated 9.153 million viewers tuning in. Fringe was up fifteen percent from the previous week with a 3.0 rating, tying its highest 18–49 ratings share for the season. It was the second most viewed episode of the season after the season premiere "A New Day in the Old Town".

=== Reviews ===
"I thought last night's revelation about Walter's father being a Nazi scientist/Allied spy was just too much. We didn't need that extra backstory on Walter; we didn't need to make this monster-of-the-week personal. In fact making it personal, to my mind, made the episode feel clichéd rather than grossout fun, which is what a monster-of-the-week should be."

— io9 columnist Annalee Newitz

The episode received mixed to positive reviews from television critics. Jane Boursaw of TV Squad wasn't sure what to think about "The Bishop Revival", but loved the plotline about Walter's dad being a German spy working for the US government. Alternately, Annalee Newitz of io9 called the episode "surprisingly meh"; while appreciating "all the weird family revelations about the Bishops", she believed the revelations about Walter's father to be "too much" because "we didn't need that extra backstory". Newitz wished Fringe had brought back Olivia's childhood subplot and its ties with Walter and Peter. The A.V. Club columnist Noel Murray was also critical of the episode, explaining "Plotwise, there wasn't much going on in 'The Bishop Revival.'... The FD tracked down a criminal and felled that criminal; that's really it." Murray did however praise the killer's methods and "Aryan aloofness" as "cool" and "delightfully old-school". Like Newitz, Tim Grierson of the magazine New York believed the episode contained "stupid revelations"; for instance, the Nazi connection of Walter's father "just felt like a variation on season one's episodes in which bizarre phenomena could always magically be linked back to Walter's work for the government. Obviously, this info about Peter's grandfather was supposed to be 'shocking,' showing how the Bishop family's scientific work can so easily be perverted for evil, but by this point it just seems like a very artificial, unnecessary ploy to keep us engaged."

Other than a few minor complaints with the episode's logic, IGN writer Ramsey Isler thought positively about "The Bishop Revival" and the Nazi story element in particular, stating "there's a definite unique Fringe flavor that makes this story work". Isler disliked the unsolved mystery of Hoffman however, writing the "story really had the feel of one of those intriguing but ultimately disposable stories in the Fringe library". Jennifer Walker from TV Fanatic called the episode "amazing" and a "heart stopper", while Andrew Hanson of the Los Angeles Times enjoyed the father-son dynamic. Ken Tucker from Entertainment Weekly wrote "The Bishop Revival" was "one of the series' most satisfying stand-alone episodes" because it featured a "good threat" and gave more information about the Bishop family's backstory. Tucker praised John Noble's performance, as his "portrayal of Walter encompasses everything from endearing daffiness to ferocious concentration and commitment". MTV's Josh Wigler believed the episode was "terrific," but wished there was more of a balance between the show's three leads, and that Olivia was featured on a regular basis. He, Hanson, and other critics agreed that this and the previous week's episode gave Fringe some strong momentum heading into the winter finale. Though normally skeptical of the series' many fringe cases, Popular Mechanics called the episode Fringe's "most plausible case yet".

=== Awards and nominations ===
At the 2011 Young Artist Awards, Sierra Pitkin received a nomination for Best Performance in a TV Series under the category "Guest Starring Young Actress Ten and Under".
