= 6B (Fringe) =

- Fringe episode
- Alice Merchant sees the "ghost" of her dead husband
- Episode no.: Season 3 Episode 14
- Directed by: Thomas Yatsko
- Written by: Glen Whitman; Robert Chiappetta
- Production code: 3X6114
- Original air date: February 18, 2011

Guest appearances
- Ryan McDonald as Brandon Fayette; Seth Gabel as Lincoln Lee; Phyllis Somerville as Alice Merchant; Ken Pogue as Derek Merchant; Michelle Brezinski as Mrs. Marcello; Conan Graham as Rick Kimball; Colby Johannson as Chris; Monica Mustelier as Sylvia; Peter New as Doorman; Erin Simms as Kim Kimball

Episode chronology
← Previous "Immortality"	Next → "Subject 13"
- Fringe season 3

"6B" is the 14th episode of the third season of the American science fiction drama television series Fringe, and the 57th episode overall. In the episode, the fringe team investigates mysterious deaths at an apartment building, the result of a merging between the prime and parallel universes; while there, they encounter a woman who claims to be able to see the ghost of her deceased husband.

Story editors Glen Whitman and Robert Chiappetta co-wrote "6B", while cinematographer Thomas Yatsko directed. The episode featured appearances from recurring actors Ryan McDonald and Seth Gabel as well as one-time guest stars Phyllis Somerville and Ken Pogue. The episode first aired in the United States on February 18, 2011, on the Fox network, and was watched by an estimated 4.1 million viewers. Television critics gave the episode generally mixed reviews.

== Plot ==
Six partygoers simultaneously fall to the sidewalk outside the Rosencrantz apartment building in Brooklyn, apparently having jumped from a seventh-floor balcony along with the balcony's furniture. When the Fringe team investigates, Peter (Joshua Jackson) and Walter (John Noble) determine by the location of the bodies that they seem to have fallen through the balcony, as if it momentarily ceased to exist. From other stories of strange phenomena occurring throughout the building, Walter concludes that the same cracks in reality that have harmed the parallel universe are starting to appear in the prime one, with the building occupying a weak spot between universes.

Peter and Olivia (Anna Torv) are sent by Walter to observe the building as he monitors seismic equipment from the lab. Peter and Olivia go to a bar while waiting, where Olivia tries to kiss Peter but becomes uncomfortable, knowing of the influence of her parallel universe doppelganger, Fauxlivia (Torv), on Peter. Her emotional reaction triggers her ability to see once again the "shimmer" around Peter that marks him as a native of the parallel universe. She excuses herself and steps outside for some fresh air, followed by Peter. Olivia notices a similar glow emanating from the windows of apartment 6B in the Rosencrantz building, owned by the widow Mrs. Alice Merchant (Phyllis Somerville). When Olivia and Peter enter the apartment, Olivia (but not Peter) can see a shimmering figure that Alice claims is the ghost of her late husband Derek (Ken Pogue). Walter surmises that the figure is a parallel Derek seen across a crack between the universes. If the crack widens, Walter predicts they would see occurrences of the same singularities that have plagued the parallel universe, and suggests the use of the same amber-like compound they had previously recovered ("The Ghost Network") to limit the damage. With Massive Dynamic's resources, they are able to recreate the amber and a release system to encase the building, but hold it in reserve as a last resort only.

Olivia suggests the possibility that the effect is due to quantum entanglement between Alice in the prime universe and Derek in the parallel one. Alice previously told Olivia that Derek died recently from trying to replace a faulty fuse after they flipped a coin to decide who would replace it, and Walter surmises that the parallel universe Alice died in a similar fashion due to a different outcome of the coin flip. Alice's connection to the parallel universe Derek is causing the crack. As the building starts to exhibit the initial signs of a singularity and Broyles (Lance Reddick) prepares to release the amber, Olivia and Peter attempt to persuade Alice that the man she sees is not really her husband. Alice does not believe them until Derek starts to refer to their children. Alice, who is childless, realizes Peter and Olivia are telling the truth; the connection is broken and the effects on the building ebb away.

Though they did not need to deploy the amber, Walter realizes how close he was to making the same decisions that Walternate (Noble), Walter's doppelganger in the parallel universe, had to make to save his universe; Nina (Blair Brown) helps to counsel him. Meanwhile, Olivia and Peter attempt to reconcile and rekindle their relationship. Though still cautious about moving forward, Olivia and Peter kiss and head upstairs at the Bishops' home.

In the parallel universe, Fauxlivia and Lincoln (Seth Gabel) investigate reports of a Fringe event in the Rosencrantz building, and speak with Derek, who tells them he has not noticed anything out of the ordinary. The two leave, and Derek is left paging sadly through a photo album filled with pictures of him and his late wife and their daughters.

== Production ==
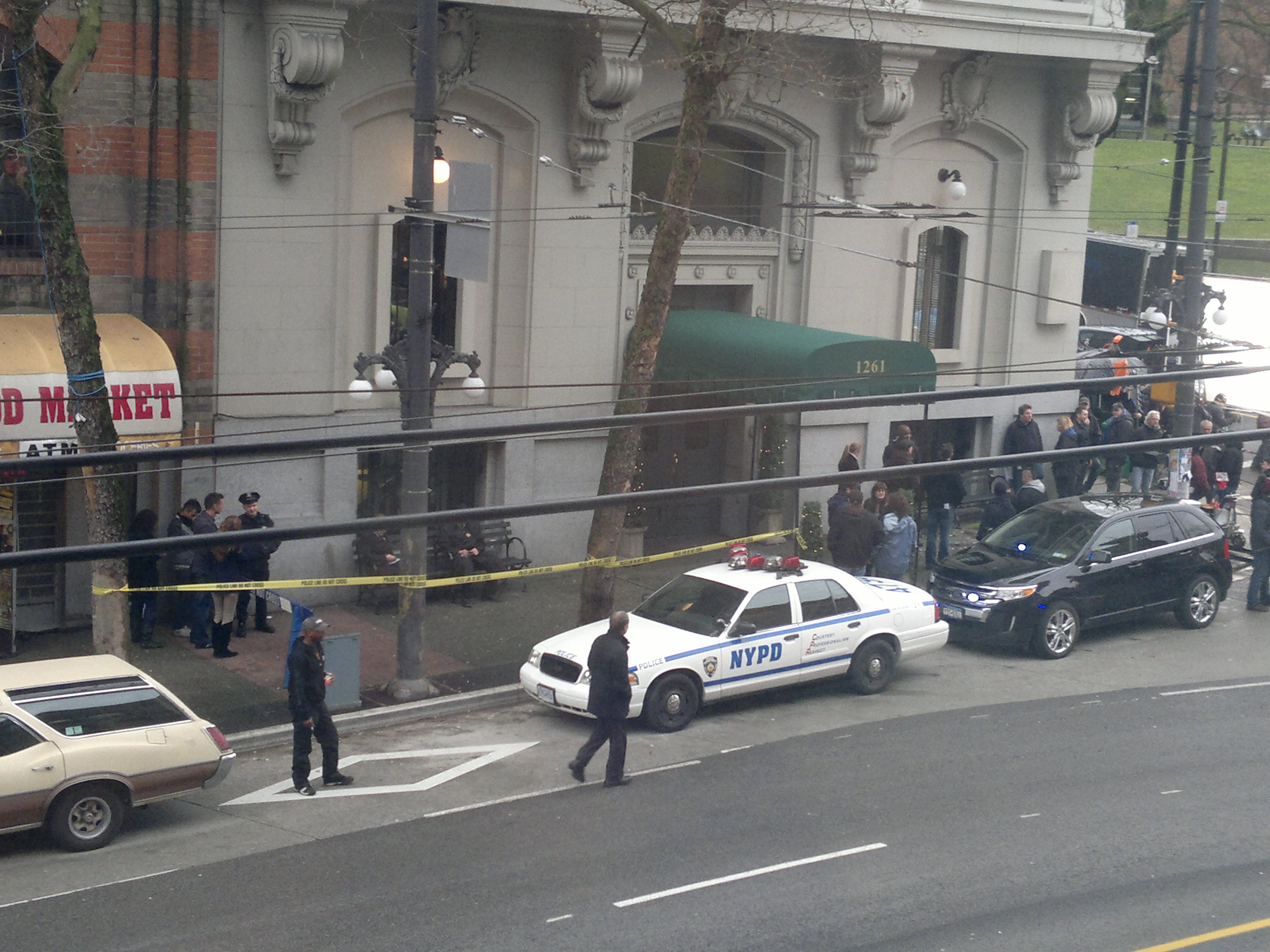
Filming for "6B" took place in December 2010 at Hastings and Cambie streets in Vancouver, staged as New York City.

The episode was co-written by story editors Glen Whitman and Robert Chiappetta, while being directed by cinematographer and Fringe director of photography Thomas Yatsko. The last credit Whitman and Chiappetta received was for the season's sixth episode, "6955 kHz". Yatsko last directed the second season episode "White Tulip". Alluding to the week the episode broadcast, executive producer Jeff Pinkner called "6B" "our Valentine’s Day episode. It’s all different versions of a love story."

While filming, first assistant director Brian Giddens summarized the episode as "the fringe team [finding] out there's been an accident on a balcony". The focus of "6B" centered on the idea of ghosts, which was affirmed by actor Joshua Jackson, who called it "a Fringe ghost story". Referring to the episode's intensity level, Jackson noted that "on a scale of chile peppers, I'd say it's high habanero". Pinkner remarked that "6B" and the following episode "Subject 13" would "tell deep and meaningful sides of the Olivia and Peter story. One in the present ["6B"] and one in the past ["Subject 13]."

The episode guest starred Phyllis Somerville, known for her recent work on the Showtime series The Big C that ended in her character's death. Somerville expressed hope that the science fiction nature of Fringe would convince The Big C writers to hire her back, commenting "maybe I can get those sci-fi folks to hook me up with a good gadget that will allow Marlene to come back to life and bug Laura Linney some more." "6B" featured recurring guest actors Ryan McDonald and Seth Gabel as Massive Dynamic scientist Brandon Fayette and Agent Lincoln Lee, respectively. The episode also featured one-time guest star Ken Pogue as Alice's husband Derek.

As with other Fringe episodes, Fox released a science lesson plan in collaboration with Science Olympiad for grade school children, focusing on the science seen in "6B", with the intention of having "students learn about spectroscopy and how it can be used to determine certain characteristics of things."

== Cultural references ==
Some critics believed that the name of the apartment building, as well as Walter's coin tosses coming up heads, are references to the 1966 tragicomedy Rosencrantz and Guildenstern Are Dead, which in turn derives from the characters of Rosencrantz and Guildenstern, two minor characters in Shakespeare's Hamlet.

== Reception ==
=== Ratings ===
"6B" was watched by an estimated 4.1 million viewers on its first broadcast, earning a ratings share of 1.5, up 7 percent from the previous week's episode. It led other shows in the same timeslot by more than 20 percent for the 18-34 adult viewership market, and second only to Kitchen Nightmares for the night. Three days of time shifted viewing increased the 18-49 adult rating to 2.3, a 52 percent increase from its previous rating of 1.5.

=== Reviews ===
Entertainment Weekly staff writer Ken Tucker thought it was not "the best Fringe episode", primarily because of "its Twilight Zone construction, with a supernatural event serving as a big, obvious metaphor for... the rift between lovers (Peter and Olivia; the elderly couple Alice and Derek)". Tucker disliked Olivia's return to "season-one-Olivia poker-faced dolorousness" and also "worr[ied] about the imbalance between the series’ romantic, family, and mythology ingredients". Andrew Hanson from the Los Angeles Times felt that the episode's emphasis on emotions (instead of plain science) was "turning its back on the science that made [Fringe] great". Hanson also wished the parallels between Walter and Walternate's decisions had been explored further.

The A.V. Club's Noel Murray graded the episode a B-, explaining that, despite the "nice moments (including a strong start and a sweet finish)", the plot was minimal and there were many moments he was exasperated with the Peter-Olivia relationship. For Murray, the episode was "saved" by its small touches, such as when Alice is finally convinced the ghost is not her husband when he mentions "the girls miss you".

In her 2011 book Into the Looking Glass: Exploring the Worlds of Fringe, author Sarah Clarke Stuart found parallels between the episode and the 2011 Tōhoku earthquake and tsunami, which occurred several weeks after "6B" aired. Items of comparison included the "cracks" in the universe and shifting tectonic plates, and the "vortex" and the tsunami swallowing up entire villages. Clarke Stuart noted that "because of its destabilizing character, the natural world is often depicted as the antagonist in science fiction and adventure narratives" like Fringe.
