= A Better Human Being =

- Fringe episode
- Episode no.: Season 4 Episode 13
- Directed by: Joe Chappelle
- Story by: Glen Whitman; Robert Chiappetta
- Teleplay by: Alison Schapker; Monica Owusu-Breen
- Production code: 3X7013
- Original air date: February 17, 2012

Guest appearances
- John Aylward as Dr. Owen Frank; Harrison Thomas as Sean Martin; Sandra Ferens as Mrs. Keenan; Allison Hossack as Bernadette

Episode chronology
← Previous "Welcome to Westfield"	Next → "The End of All Things"
- Fringe season 4

"A Better Human Being" is the thirteenth episode of the fourth season of the Fox science-fiction drama television series Fringe, and the series' 78th episode overall.

The episode was co-written by Robert Chiappetta, Alison Schapker, Monica Owusu-Breen, and Glen Whitman. Joe Chappelle directed the episode.

== Plot ==
When Peter Bishop (Joshua Jackson) realizes that Olivia Dunham (Anna Torv) is experiencing memories from the Olivia of his original timeline, he convinces her to allow his father Walter (John Noble) to examine her. They find nothing immediately wrong with her brain, but Walter takes some hair samples for testing. With Olivia out of earshot, Walter scolds Peter in the belief that Peter is—perhaps unintentionally—empathizing his memories onto Olivia, who as a child was highly emotionally attuned to others.

The Fringe division learns of a case of a teenager, Sean Martin (Harrison Thomas), in a mental institution who, while in a nighttime trance, reportedly related in perfect detail the distant murder of a reporter by three teenagers. Sean explains that he hears voices from "outside" his head, leading Walter to believe that some type of telepathy is involved. Sean's transcription of the voices he heard during the murder leads the team to a subway bathroom, where they discover blood from an assailant injured in the attack. Astrid (Jasika Nicole) stays with the boy as he is purposely taken off his medications, hoping to identify the voices that he hears.

Analysis of the assailant's blood does not produce an identity, but Walter realizes that the sample shares a similar genetic anomaly with Sean's DNA, a trait that can only be shared by common ancestry. Olivia and Lincoln (Seth Gabel) learn from Sean's mother that Sean was conceived by in vitro fertilisation, and that the deceased reporter had called her a few days before, looking into the process. Walter concludes that Sean is reading the thoughts of other in vitro children that share the same genetic trait and are protecting themselves like animals in a hive. The team locates the doctor that performed the process, Dr. Owen Frank (John Aylward). Dr. Frank admits that he modified and donated samples of his own DNA to re-introduce instinctive traits into humans, attempting to build "a better human being". Walter recognizes that the children who share this trait are likely killing to prevent their genetically modified nature from becoming public. Dr. Frank provides Olivia and Peter with the location of his files, unaware that several of his progeny have already arrived there and are lying in wait. As Olivia and Peter discover the destroyed files, Olivia mentions information from the original timeline that Peter was not privy to, which means he can't be projecting his own memories on to her. Meanwhile, Sean hears voices plotting to ambush the duo, and Astrid is able to alert Olivia in time for her and Peter to defend themselves and capture their attackers. However, a second pair of teenagers suffocates Dr. Frank. With the doctor dead, Sean is no longer able to hear any voices, a situation he both welcomes and fears.

Walter discovers from Olivia's hair samples that she has recently been given doses of Cortexiphan. He and Lincoln confront Nina Sharp (Blair Brown) and demand an inspection of Walter and William Bell's Cortexiphan samples, which were stored in Massive Dynamic's headquarters under biometric security measures. Nina shows them the vials, but Walter recognizes that the Cortexiphan inside has been replaced with food coloring, implicating Nina.

After completing the case, Olivia and Peter stop at a gas station on their way home. Olivia discusses the lifestyle they had in Peter's timeline and he confesses that he can tell from her eyes that Olivia is the same as from his original timeline. After a brief kiss, Olivia leaves the car to use the restroom, but Peter discovers that she has disappeared. Elsewhere, Olivia regains consciousness tied up in a tiled room, along with a fatigued Nina tied to a chair opposite her, telling her that everything is all right.

== Production ==
The teleplay for this episode was co-written by co-executive producers Monica Owusu-Breen and Alison Schapker, based on a story by executive story editors Glen Whitman and Robert Chiappetta. It was directed by executive producer Joe Chappelle.

Actress Blair Brown was unaware of the surprise surrounding her character Nina Sharp, whom she had played for a number of fourth season episodes, until she received the episode's script. She noted that it was a "great thrill" to read the script, and added "The way we work is the writers always have something in mind, and it’s always more fun to just wait and see what shows up."

== Cultural references ==
In the lab, when Dr. Walter Bishop is testing Olivia Dunham's DNA, the song being played in the background is Karen Elson's "The Ghost Who Walks" from the album of the same name.

The instance of a fertility doctor using his own sperm to impregnate several of his patients is highly reminiscent of the case of Dr. Cecil Jacobson, who was accused of such practices and later convicted of perjury and had his medical license revoked.

== Reception ==
=== Ratings ===
"A Better Human Being" was first broadcast on February 17, 2012, in the United States on Fox. An estimated 3 million viewers watched the episode, marking a slight decrease in viewers from the previous episode.

=== Reviews ===
Entertainment Weekly columnist Jeff Jensen called the episode "a significant, clever, and on the whole compelling hour of season 4 Fringe." He did complain however that "as the episode progressed, I felt the case-of-the-week was no longer complementing the Olivia storyline but distracting from it. More, it just didn’t seem plausible that Olivia would continue/would be permitted to continue working after being diagnosed with what a psychologist would call 'a psychotic episode.'... Yet again: I was entertained and engaged. I thought Allegedly Crazy Sean was a clever twist on the magical nutjob archetype, and I was intellectually and emotionally activated by Olivia’s life changing internal event, which begged various meaningful questions about the nature of identity and whatnot. And I thought the performances by Anna Torv and Joshua Jackson were just great. After a slow, slightly frustrating install, Fringe 4.0's reboot-oriented operating system is beginning to yield stories that are stimulating for being unique products of that premise."

Noel Murray from The A.V. Club wrote "As a fervent Fringe fan, I couldn’t help but be moved by Olivia’s gradual return, as she has flashes of memory and begins talking about how comfortable it feels just to be with Peter. I’m still a little confused as to whether this is Amberlivia adding Ourlivia’s memories to her own, or just Ourlivia fully re-emergent, but whatever the case, it does feel right when she’s talking with Peter about how she’s waiting to see “that look in your eye” and is urging him just to do what comes naturally. The chemistry between these two characters (and actors) is so strong that it overpowered a lot of my plot nitpicks."
