= David H. Goodman =

American television writer and producer

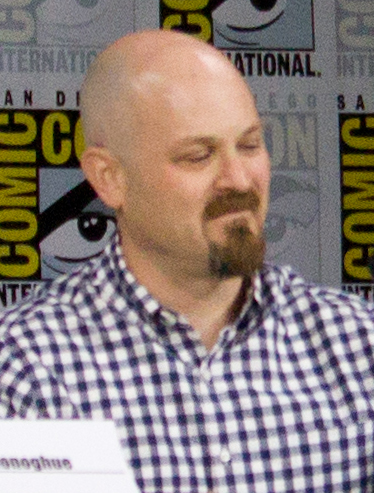
- Goodman at San Diego Comic-Con in July 2017
- Other name: David Goodman
- Occupations: Writer, producer

David H. Goodman is an American television writer and producer.

He is known for his work on the CBS drama Without a Trace and the FOX science fiction series Fringe. He most recently served as writer and executive producer on the ABC fantasy series Once Upon a Time from 2011-2018.

== Career ==
In 1997, Goodman became a script coordinator for the Sci-Fi television series The Visitor. The series was cancelled after its first season and Goodman became script coordinator for the supernatural drama series Buffy the Vampire Slayer. He joined the crew of Buffy mid-way through the second season in 1998. Goodman left the show with the close of the sixth season in 2002.

While working on Buffy, his writing debut was for Bruce Campbell vehicle Jack of All Trades with the second season episode "Croquey in the Pokey" in 2001. He wrote two episodes for the third season of Angel – "Dad" in 2001 and "Double or Nothing" in 2002.

In 2002, he became a story editor and writer for action series Fastlane, scripting the first season episode "Dosed". He also wrote for the Batman spin-off Birds of Prey and contributed two episodes, "Three Birds and a Baby" in 2002 and "Gladiatrix" in 2003.

In 2003, he became involved with Without a Trace as a story editor for the second season. He wrote the second season episodes "Moving On" (2003) and "Risen" (2004). He became an executive story editor for the third season and contributed two more episodes "Trials" (2004) and "Transitions" (2005). He joined the production team for the fourth season, initially as a co-producer. He wrote the episodes "Lost Time" and "Odds or Evens". He was promoted to producer mid-season and wrote a third episode, "Shattered". He became a supervising producer for the fifth season and wrote the episodes "Win Today" (2006), "Eating Away" (2007), "Connections" (2007) and the season finale "The Beginning" (2007). He became a co-executive producer for the sixth season and wrote the episodes "Fight/Flight" (2007) and "A Dollar and a Dream" (2008). He left the show in Spring 2008 having written thirteen episodes in total.

Goodman is a 1995 graduate of Wesleyan University.

=== Fringe ===
In 2008, he joined the crew on the first season of the FOX science fiction thriller Fringe, as a writer and co-executive producer. After completing the season, Goodman left the series. He, along with the rest of the writing staff, was nominated for the Writers Guild of America Award for Best New Series at the February 2009 ceremony for his work on the first season. Episodes Goodman co-wrote include:

- "The Ghost Network" (1.03) (co-written by supervising producer J.R. Orci)
- "The Equation" (1.08) (co-written by Orci)
- "Safe" (1.08) (co-written by consulting producer Jason Cahill)
- "The No-Brainer" (1.12) (co-written by co-producer Brad Caleb Kane)
- "Ability" (1.14) (Goodman wrote a teleplay, based on a story by executive story editors Robert Chiappetta and Glen Whitman)
- "Unearthed" (2.11) (co-written by co-executive producer Andrew Kreisberg)

=== Once Upon a Time ===
In Summer 2011, Goodman was brought on to the ABC fantasy drama Once Upon a Time, as a writer and co-executive producer. Episodes Goodman has contributed to include:

- "The Price of Gold" 1.04
- "True North" 01.09 (co-written with Liz Tigelaar)
- "What Happened to Frederick" 1.13
- "Hat Trick" 1.17 (co-written with Vladimir Cvetko)
- "An Apple Red as Blood" 1.21 (co-written with Jane Espenson)
- "The Crocodile" 2.04 (co-written with Robert Hull)
- "The Cricket Game" 2.10 (co-written with Robert Hull)
- "The Queen is Dead" 2.15 (co-written with Daniel T. Thomsen)
- "Nasty Habits" 3.04 (co-written with Robert Hull)
- "Think Lovely Thoughts" 3.08 (co-written with Robert Hull)
- "The Jolly Roger" 3.17
- "Snow Drifts" 3.21 (co-written with Robert Hull)
- "Rocky Road" 4.03 (co-written with Jerome Schwartz)
- "Smash the Mirror" 4.08 (co-written with Jerome Schwartz)
- "Enter the Dragon" 4.14 (co-written with Jerome Schwartz)
- "Sympathy for the De Vil" 4.18 (co-written with Jerome Schwartz)
- "The Broken Kingdom" 5.04 (co-written with Jerome Schwartz)
- "Birth" 5.08 (co-written with Jerome Schwartz)
- "The Brothers Jones" 5.15 (co-written with Jerome Schwartz)
- "Sisters" 5.19 (co-written with Brigitte Hales)
- "Only You" 5.22 (co-written with Andrew Chambliss)
- "Strange Case" 6.04 (co-written with Nelson Soler)
- "Changelings" 6.09 (co-written with Brian Ridings)
- "Page 23" 6.14 (co-written with Brigitte Hales)
- "Where Bluebirds Fly" 6.18 (co-written with Brigitte Hales)
- "The Song in Your Heart" 6.20 (co-written with Andrew Chambliss)
- "The Garden of Forking Paths" 7.03 (co-written with Brigitte Hales)
