= Glen Whitman =

American screenwriter

- Born: Douglas Glen Whitman; 1972
- Education: New York University (Ph.D., 2000); American University (B.A., 1994)
- Occupations: Economist, screenwriter
- Years active: 2000–present
- Employer: California State University, Northridge
- Website: Official website

Douglas Glen Whitman is an American television writer and a professor of economics.

== Academic career ==
Whitman is a professor of economics at California State University, Northridge, where he has been on the faculty since 2000. He has also served as a research fellow at the libertarian-oriented Independent Institute, a public policy think tank.

His expertise is in microeconomics, applied game theory, and economic analysis of law. He received his Ph.D. in economics from New York University in 2000 and his undergraduate degree in economics and politics from American University in 1994.

Whitman's 2014 book Economics of the Undead, co-edited with James Dow, is an academic collection of essays that use zombies to explain and demonstrate concepts of economics. He is also the author of Strange Brew: Alcohol and Government Monopoly (2003).

== Screenwriting career ==
In his second career, Whitman has written for the FOX science-fiction series Fringe, the El Rey Network series Matador, the FX series The Strain, and NBC's The Blacklist: Redemption.

Along with his writing partner Robert Chiappetta, Whitman was a science advisor to the creators of Fringe before its first season. Whitman and Chiappetta served as executive story editors on Fringe, and contributed several scripts to the series.

=== Fringe episodes ===
- "Ability" (season 1, ep. 14) (teleplay by co-executive producer David H. Goodman, based on a story by Whitman and Chiappetta)
- "Of Human Action" (season 2, ep. 7)
- "The Bishop Revival" (season 2, ep. 4)
- "6955 kHz" (season 3, ep. 6)
- "6B" (season 3, ep. 14)
- "And Those We've Left Behind" (season 4, ep. 6)
- "A Better Human Being" (season 4, ep. 13) (teleplay by co-executive producers Alison Schapker and Monica Owusu-Breen, based on a story by Chiappetta and Whitman)

== Personal life ==
As a blogger on topics including language and linguistics, Whitman is credited with coining the word snowclone in 2004.
