= Chiappetta =

Chiappetta is an Italian surname. It originates from both the Province of Cosenza in the southern Italian region of Calabria and the western part of Sicily (Province of Trapani), where records exist dating back to 1612 in Salaparuta. Since the 18th century, the surname has spread to other areas of Italy. After Cosenza, the Italian provinces with the largest number of inhabitants named Chiappetta are Rome, Milan and Naples.

Propelled by the Italian immigration to other countries, mostly in the late 19th century and early 20th century, the Chiappetta name was taken across Europe and to other continents. Nowadays the countries with the largest number of Chiappettas are the United States, Canada, Brazil, Germany and Argentina.

== Surnames derived from and modified after Chiappetta ==
Other Italian surnames that derive from Chiappetta are:

- Chiappetti and Chiapetti, found mostly in the metropolitan areas around Milan, Rome, Naples and Ancona. Curiously, the form Chiappetti is also found in southern and eastern Sardinia – whereas Chiappetta is not registered in that island at all. Rather than indicating a different origin for the name Chiappetti, it is understood that this is an adaptation of the word Chiappetta to the phonology typical of the Sardinian language.
- The very rare Chiappette, found only in the Province of Trapani, in Sicily.

In countries like the United States and Brazil the name Chiappetta has been sometimes modified on the course of one generation to another to forms such as Ciappetta, Chaupetta, Chiappeta, Chiapetta, Chiapete, Chappetta, Chapeta and Chiapeta. In Croatia is modified to be Capeta (Ćapeta).

== List of people ==
- Robert Chiappetta, television writer and lawyer
- Hank Chiappetta, American artist and sculptor from Spokane, WA
