= Alberta Mayne =

Canadian actress, theatre producer and social activist

- Born: Alberta Rosemarie Katherina Mayne; 10 November 1980 (age 45)
- Other name: Alberta Mayn
- Occupation: actress
- Years active: 2005–2017
- Spouse: William "Billy" Bligh (m. 2013)
- Website: www.albertamayne.com

Alberta Rosemarie Katherina Mayne (born 1980) is a Canadian actress, theatre producer and social activist from Calgary, Alberta. In 2000, she ran a theatre company based in Vancouver. In 2006, she started to focus on film and television, landing roles in television movies such as The Ties that Bind. In 2007, she was part of two films that premiered in the Toronto International Film Festival; she was featured in Battle in Seattle and a supporting lead in The Soft Revolution. She then went to land guest star roles in The L Word, Fringe, Psych, as well as supporting roles in television movies and feature films.

== Filmography ==
=== Film ===
Year	Title	Role	Notes
2005	After Tomorrow	Tory	also producer
2007	Battle in Seattle	Protester #3	
2008	Vice	Chris	
2009	Night at the Museum: Battle of the Smithsonian	Greta Zimmer Friedman (Kissing Nurse)	
2009	Dinner and Show	Nicole	Short
2010	A Trace of Danger	Reporter	TV movie
2010	Transparency	Joyce	
2010	The Client List	Sarah	TV movie
2010	Concrete Canyons	April	TV movie
2013	The Bouquet	Mandy Benton	
2014	The Brittany Murphy Story	Ashley	TV movie
2015	Dark Intentions	Emotional Mother	
2016	Pure Pwnage	Studio Executive	
2016	Day of Reckoning	No role	Casting assistant
2017	Sleepwalker	Dr. Cooper's assistant	
2017	Aftermath	additional voices	

=== Television ===
Year	Title	Role	Notes
2006	Ties That Bind	Robin Smith	
2007	This Space for Rent	Female Customer	episode: Stain'd
2008	The L Word	Gina	episode: Look Out, Here They Come!
2010	Fringe	Young Mother	episode: What Lies Below (uncredited), The Bishop Rivival
2010	Psych	Gemma Kramer	episode: Dead Bear Walking
2014	Chop Shop	Officer Benton	episode: #1.6
2014	Supernatural	Mrs. Chandler	episode: Fan Fiction
