= Robert Chiappetta =

American television writer and lawyer

- Occupations: Screenwriter, lawyer

Robert Chiappetta is an American television writer and lawyer.

== Career ==
Chiappetta, along with his writing partner Glen Whitman, served as executive story editors on the FOX crime/mystery series Fringe, and contributed several scripts to the show as well. Chiapetta and Whitman were science advisors to the creators of Fringe before its first season began.

=== Fringe episodes ===
- "Ability" (season 1, ep. 14) (teleplay by co-executive producer David H. Goodman, based on a story by Whitman and Chiappetta)
- "Of Human Action" (season 2, ep. 7)
- "The Bishop Revival" (season 2, ep. 13)
- "6955 kHz" (season 3, ep. 6)
- "6B" (season 3, ep. 14)
- "And Those We've Left Behind" (season 4, ep. 6)
- "A Better Human Being" (season 4, ep. 13) (teleplay by co-executive producers Alison Schapker and Monica Owusu-Breen, based on a story by Chiappetta and Whitman)
