= The Ghost Network =

- Fringe episode
- Roy is wearing equipment that will help the Fringe team tap into the "Ghost Network".
- Episode no.: Season 1 Episode 3
- Directed by: Frederick E. O. Toye
- Written by: David H. Goodman; J. R. Orci
- Production code: 3T7652
- Original air date: September 23, 2008

Guest appearances
- Michael Cerveris as The Observer; Zak Orth as Roy McComb; Peter Hermann as Grant Davidson; Donnie Keshawarz as Gerard; David Lansbury as Matthew Ziegler; Peggy Scott as Mrs. Scott; David Wolos-Fonteno as Father Kent; Megan Neuringer as Paula; Clark Jackson as Young Pastor; Mira Tzur as Anna Jiminez; Jacqueline Beaulieu as Nina's assistant; Brian Tarantina as Nice guy

Episode chronology
← Previous "The Same Old Story"	Next → "The Arrival"
- Fringe season 1

"The Ghost Network" is the third episode of the first season of the American science fiction drama television series Fringe. The episode was written by co-executive producer David H. Goodman and supervising producer J. R. Orci, and was directed by Frederick E. O. Toye. The episode follows the Fringe team's investigation into a bus that was filled with amber, encasing the people inside. They discover a man named Roy (Zak Orth) who predicted it and other similar events, and Walter realizes Roy has connections to a past experiment he did over twenty years ago, called the "Ghost Network".

The episode was important in the show's evolution, as the writers noted that Roy was the first guest character the audience could get emotionally invested in. "The Ghost Network" also included their quest to explain seemingly impossible and weird phenomena through a real scientific explanation from Walter's past research.

It first aired on the Fox network in the United States on September 23, 2008. An estimated 9.42 million viewers watched the episode on its first broadcast. It received mixed reviews, with many believing the show to be finally finding its legs, while others worried over the ongoing formulaic storylines featured in each episode.

== Plot ==
A man named Roy McComb (Zak Orth) confesses to his priest that he sees visions of bad things, including a bus where everyone is going to die. Simultaneously with this scene, a man enters a bus, unleashes a canister emitting gaseous fumes, and steals a backpack before quickly getting off. The Fringe team arrives soon after, only to find the fumes have hardened into an amber-like substance, trapping and killing those inside. Walter (John Noble) studies the substance and concludes it started out as a gas and then solidified, suffocating the passengers. While looking at a victim's video footage, Olivia (Anna Torv) discovers a backpack is missing, and traces it back to one of the victims, a Federal employee with undercover connections to a drug cartel. They interview her "handler", who comes to identify her body. The Fringe team finds out about Roy, and search through his apartment, believing he is behind the bus and other Pattern-related terror attacks. They soon realize all of his drawings are dated before the incidents took place, despite the fact that several of them were never made public. In an interrogation, Roy tells Charlie (Kirk Acevedo) he's been receiving his visions for nine months, roughly when they began seeing Pattern-related attacks.

Meanwhile, they trace the substance to Massive Dynamic. Olivia interviews Massive Dynamic executive Nina Sharp (Blair Brown), who tells her the substance has been seen in an attack before. Walter suspects Roy is psychic and runs tests on him before realizing Roy has some kind of magnetic compound in his blood. This leads Walter to recall he and his old lab partner William Bell had conducted research on creating a "Ghost Network" to secretly communicate messages from one person to another in an otherwise undetectable frequency range. During this research, Roy was one of his past test subjects. Walter further theorizes that someone else has perfected his research, and that Roy is overhearing secret messages from some of the people behind the terrorist attacks. Olivia and Peter (Joshua Jackson) arrive at his old house to find equipment needed to tap into Roy's mind.

Using the equipment, they are able to intercept messages in Latin detailing an upcoming exchange at South Station in an hour. They realize the handler removed a small crystalline disk from the Federal agent's hand when he identified her body, and that he is now going to exchange it for something else. Olivia intercepts the man, who is killed before she can talk to him. She chases another man involved in the exchange, who commits suicide in front of a bus after giving them a briefcase containing the disc. Phillip Broyles (Lance Reddick) secretly gives the disc to Nina for analysis, while Roy is sent home, as they believe he will no longer see visions because the Ghost Network has been compromised.

== Production ==
=== Writing ===
Executive producer Jeff Pinkner decided he wanted fellow executive producer David H. Goodman and supervising producer J. R. Orci to collaborate in writing the episode; Goodman wrote the first half, while Orci wrote the rest of the episode. The two later worked together on only one other episode, "The Equation". Frederick E. O. Toye directed the episode, as he had worked previously with the writers on Alias. The writers had the idea for a couple of weeks of Olivia walking into an apartment and discovering walls covered with drawings of events that "no man could possibly have known about". They wanted to take "urban myths or legends of strange events" and come up with a fringe science equivalent; this led them to creating the story of Roy, a man with seemingly "psychic" abilities, which they then expanded by offering a real scientific explanation in the form of Walter's past research. In the show's early development, the producers were also unsure about how other aspects should be developed, such as Joshua Jackson's character Peter. For instance, in "The Ghost Network", they debated whether or not Peter would break into his childhood home before finally "stalling and just let him do it"; Orci came up with Peter's explanation to Olivia, that he used to live there so it wasn't really breaking in.

=== Casting ===
The character Roy McComb was played by actor Zak Orth. Roy's name was inspired from Richard Dreyfuss' character Roy Neary in Close Encounters of the Third Kind. The writers noted in the audio commentary that Roy was the first guest character the audience could get emotionally invested in. They wanted the actor to shave off his hair in preparation for the experimentation scene in Walter's lab, but Orth successfully "begged" them to change their minds. When casting for the part of Grant, the writers looked for a man similar in appearance to previous character John Scott (Mark Valley), as they wanted "to play into whatever Olivia's feelings about how she was or was not betrayed by John". Peter Hermann won the part.

=== Filming ===
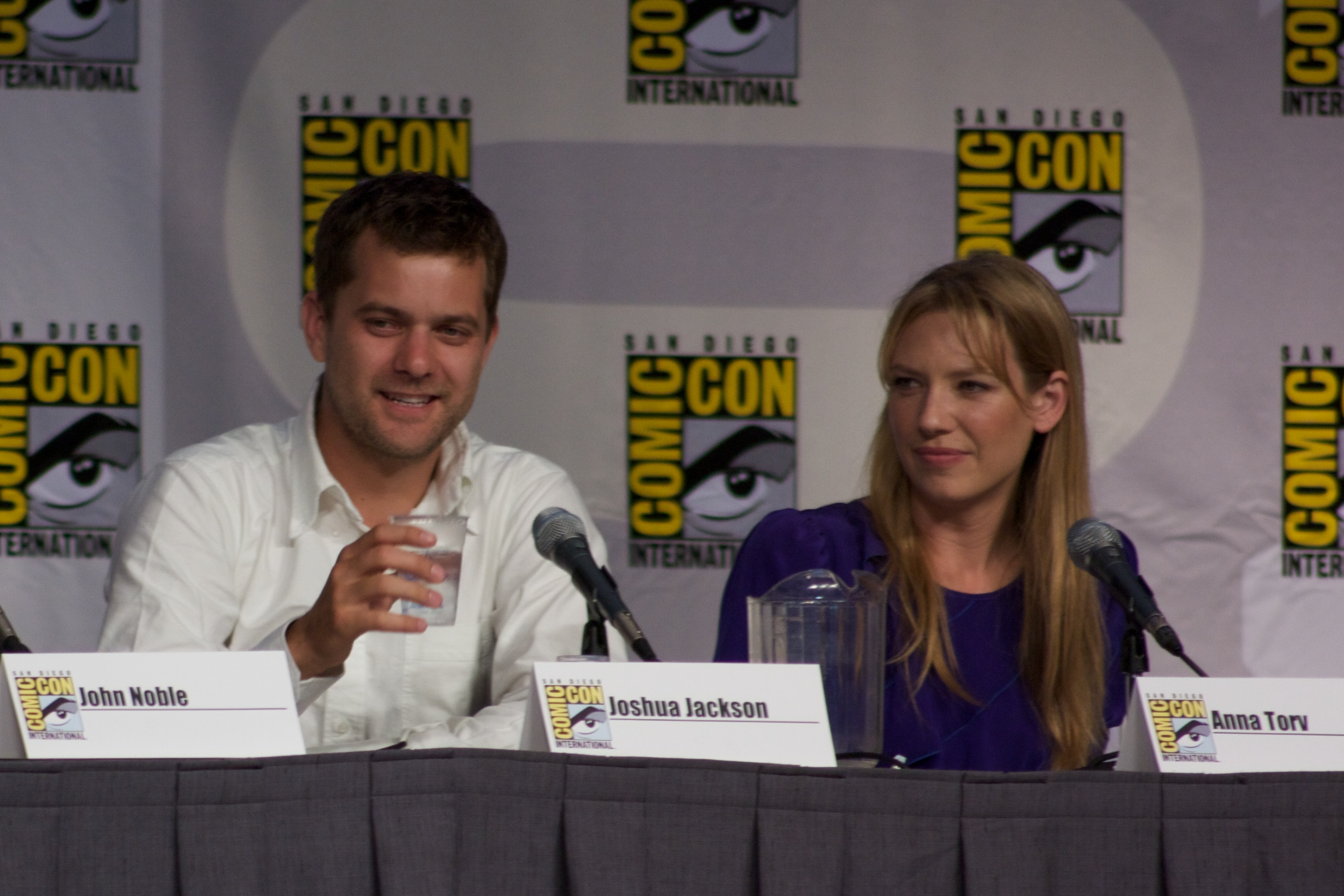
Actor Joshua Jackson (pictured left) actually plays the piano in the episode.

Orci came up with the idea to start the episode in a church's confessional, while the ambered scene on the bus was originally scripted to take place on a subway; one of the writers felt the bus "let you see more of the city". Early in the show's creation the writers were trying to figure out what Fringe could be, and ultimately chose "big crazy event[s]" at the start of each episode that would catapult its plot and drive its characters. They felt the bus scene essentially achieved this. When creating the scene on the bus when the gas canister is released, the crew sat on a bus that was really driving through the streets of New York City; director Frederick Toye called the shooting "Student film style, run and gun". To shoot the three scenes of the bus in the tunnel, the crew looked at a variety of locations before choosing a tunnel near the United Nations headquarters on the east side of Manhattan. As it was a busy area, they had to shoot at night and then attempt to make it appear to be daytime, as the scenes were set during the day. They had a limited schedule to shoot all three scenes, and despite never having seen the tunnel before, the production crews had 8–9 hours to quickly set up the massive set and leave enough time to shoot the scenes before dawn approached. To simulate being encased in amber, the actors had to pretend they were frozen.

The episode marked the first time composer Michael Giacchino worked with assistant Chad Seiter on a Fringe episode. Seiter would continue to score the rest of the season's first half. Joshua Jackson's character briefly plays the piano in a scene near the end of the episode, and it is really Jackson playing. The writers noted in the audio commentary that Jackson can actually play the piano, and that when he receives musical scenes, he learns the piece(s) beforehand to be able to play it for the scene.

== Reception ==
=== Ratings ===
"The Ghost Network" first aired in the United States on September 23, 2008. The episode's broadcast was watched by an estimated 9.42 million viewers in the US.

=== Reviews ===
The story this week is a good one and it isn’t just a case of the week, it’s also tied directly into the mythology of the series. Actually, every case of the week is tied to the mythology but this week’s story is directly connected to the shady people that the Fringe team is searching for. By the end of the episode, the mystery becomes extremely compelling and finally Fringe hits that special place of TV series addiction reserved for shows like LOST and Battlestar Galactica.

— Stephen Lackey, Mania.com

The episode received mixed reviews. The A.V. Club's Noel Murray graded the episode with a B, explaining that while he thought it was "much more fun" than the previous week's episode and enjoyed Peter's expanded presence, he was growing slightly wearied by the "hint-dropping" of Peter's past. Murray thought the climax was "so exciting" that he was willing "to forgive the fact that this is the third week in a row that Walter's big idea has involved some kind of communication with the unconscious". IGN's Travis Fickett rated it 7.5/10, writing that he thought it was a solid episode because the "characters are coming together nicely, the story is better than last week's – but already it seems the show is hitting a formula". Fickett expressed worriment that Fringe would eventually become too formulaic, much like the first season of Smallville, and concluded his review by calling Fringe "a solid show, but [not] exceptional yet".

Writing for Mania.com, Stephen Lackey thought that though the episode wasn't perfect, Fringe had finally seemed to hit its stride, as its "mix of humor and darker storytelling... is starting to come together nicely". Lackey concluded his review by expressing his "excitement" at watching Fringe get better and better, and thought the show could become the best new series of the year if it continued to improve with each episode. Another UGO writer, Alex Zalben, compared "The Ghost Network" to the similarly-plotted The X-Files film The X-Files: I Want to Believe. Zalben wrote, "Man, that X-Files movie was just no good. Fringe wins."
