= Clark Middleton =

American actor (1957–2020)

- Middleton as Charlie in Twin Peaks season 3, 2017
- Born: Clark Tinsley Middleton; April 13, 1957; Bristol, Tennessee, U.S.
- Died: October 4, 2020 (aged 63); Los Angeles, California, U.S.
- Occupation: Actor
- Years active: 1983–2020
- Spouse: Elissa Middleton (m. 2006)

Clark Tinsley Middleton (April 13, 1957 – October 4, 2020) was an American actor. He is best known for his supporting roles in Kill Bill: Vol. 2, Sin City, Fringe, Snowpiercer, and The Blacklist.

== Early life ==
Born Clark Tinsley Middleton on April 13, 1957, in Bristol, Tennessee, he grew up in Tucson, Arizona.

Middleton learned that he had juvenile rheumatoid arthritis when he was four and a half years old. The doctors said he would probably not live through another winter in the cold, damp climate. He summarized its effects in an interview: "At first it distorted my hands. Then the cortisone I had to take made my cheeks fat. At 8, I lost movement in my neck. When I was 15, my hip snapped. After an operation, I had to be on crutches and later, after I broke my leg falling over my dog, on canes." He remained at a height of 5 ft 4 in (163 cm).

== Career ==
Middleton's first step toward acting was signing up for a $15 acting class with friends at a California junior college. After participating in a little bit of theater in L.A., he moved to New York City to study acting. He took classes at the Herbert Berghof Studio, and Geraldine Page became his teacher.

He made his film debut in the 1983 TV movie, Miss Lonelyhearts. In 1997, Middleton wrote the one-person play, Miracle Mile, about his lifelong struggle with juvenile rheumatoid arthritis. He performed it in New York City and other parts of the US.

In the 1990s, Middleton had a recurring role on Law & Order as forensics technician, Ellis. He also played a recurring character known as Edward Markham, a rare book dealer, in the science-fiction series, Fringe. Middleton appeared as a recurring cast member on The Blacklist in which he played Glen Carter, a DMV worker who moonlights as a tracker. In 2017, he was cast as Charlie, Audrey Horne's husband, in the Showtime Network series, Twin Peaks: The Return, the sequel to the 1990s TV series, Twin Peaks.

His final performance, via Zoom, was in July 2020. He played a weary Times Square hotel night clerk in Eugene O'Neill's one-act play, Hughie. He performed it from his bedroom.

Following Middleton's death, his character Glen also died of West Nile virus in The Blacklist (season 8) episode 6, "The Wellstone Agency." The episode was dedicated to Middleton, and featured Huey Lewis playing himself as part of the character's memorial.

== Personal life ==
He married Elissa Meyers in 2006.

== Death ==
Middleton died of complications from West Nile virus on October 4, 2020, at Cedars-Sinai Medical Center. He was 63 years old. He is survived by his wife Elissa.

== Selected filmography ==
- American Playhouse (1983, TV Series) as Congregation
- Bail Jumper (1990) as Dickey
- The Contenders (1993) as John
- Law & Order (1997–2000, TV Series) as Ellis
- The Opponent (2000) as Max Weller
- Little Pieces (2000) as Bellhop
- Serendipity (2001) as Airport Cab Driver
- Kill Bill: Vol. 2 (2004) as Ernie
- Kill Bill: The Whole Bloody Affair (2004) as Ernie
- $5.15/Hr. (2004, TV Movie)
- Jonny Zero (2005, TV Series) as Wally
- Sin City (2005) as Schutz
- CSI: Crime Scene Investigation (2005–2006, TV Series) as Delivery Man's Attorney / Freddie Sloan
- Live Free or Die (2006) as Larry
- The Convention (2006, Short) as Singing Hobo
- The Warrior Class (2007) as Carl Raffon
- Day Zero (2007) as Porn Clerk
- Law & Order: Special Victims Unit (2007, TV Series) as Landlord
- Noise (2007) as Board of Elections Worker #1
- The Attic (2007) as Dr. Cofi
- Last Call (2008) as Tim
- Taking Woodstock (2009) as Frank
- The Good Heart (2009) as Dimitri
- Fringe (2009–2012, TV Series) as Edward Markham
- As Good as Dead (2010) as Seth
- Hide Your Smiling Faces (2013) as Religious Man
- Aftermath (2013) as Man in Wheel Chair
- Snowpiercer (2013) as Painter
- Birdman (2014) as Sydney
- The Blacklist (2014–2020, TV Series) as Glen Carter
- Gotham (2014, TV Series) as Jimmy
- South of Hell (2015, TV Series) as Corky
- Trivia Night (2016)
- The Path (2016–2017, TV Series) as Richard
- Twin Peaks (2017, TV Series) as Charlie
- American Gods (2019, TV Series) as Sindri
- Agents of S.H.I.E.L.D. (2019, TV Series) as Pretorious Pryce
- American Sausage Standoff (2019) as Luke Kenneth Hosewall
