= Fringe (TV series) =

American science fiction television series (2008–2013)

- The "Prime Universe" title card used for seasons 1–3.
- Genre: Drama; Science fiction; Paranormal fiction
- Created by: J. J. Abrams; Alex Kurtzman; Roberto Orci
- Showrunners: Jeff Pinkner (seasons 1–4); J. H. Wyman (seasons 2–5)
- Starring: Anna Torv; Joshua Jackson; Lance Reddick; Kirk Acevedo; Blair Brown; Jasika Nicole; Mark Valley; John Noble; Seth Gabel
- Theme music composer: J. J. Abrams
- Composers: Michael Giacchino^{1} (2008); Chris Tilton (2009–13); Mike McCready ("Northwest Passage")
- Country of origin: United States
- Original language: English
- No. of seasons: 5
- No. of episodes: 100 (list of episodes)

Production
- Executive producers: J. J. Abrams; Bryan Burk; Alex Kurtzman; Roberto Orci; J. H. Wyman; Jeff Pinkner; Joe Chappelle
- Production locations: Toronto, Ontario ("Pilot"); New York City (Season 1); Vancouver, British Columbia (Seasons 2–5)
- Running time: 43–81 minutes
- Production companies: Bad Robot; K/O Paper Products; Warner Bros. Television

Original release
- Network: Fox
- Release: September 9, 2008 – January 18, 2013

Fringe is an American science fiction television series created by J. J. Abrams, Alex Kurtzman, and Roberto Orci. It premiered on Fox on September 9, 2008, and concluded on January 18, 2013, after five seasons comprising 100 episodes. An FBI agent, Olivia Dunham (Anna Torv), a genius but dysfunctional scientist, Walter Bishop (John Noble), and his son with a troubled past, Peter Bishop (Joshua Jackson), are all members of a newly formed Fringe Division in the Federal Bureau of Investigation. Based in Boston, Massachusetts, the team uses fringe science to investigate a series of unexplained and often ghastly occurrences which are related to a parallel universe.

The series has been described as a hybrid of fantasy, procedural dramas, and serials, influenced by films like Altered States and television shows such as Lost, The X-Files, and The Twilight Zone. The series began as a traditional mystery-of-the-week series and became more serialized in later seasons. Most episodes contain a standalone plot, with several others also exploring the series' overarching mythology.

Critical reception was lukewarm at first but became more favorable after the first season, when the series began to explore its mythology, including parallel universes with alternate timelines. The show, along with cast and crew, was nominated for many major awards. Despite its move to the "Friday night death slot" and low ratings, the series developed a cult following. It also spawned two six-part comic book series, an alternate reality game, and three novels.

== Premise ==
Fringe follows the casework of the Fringe Division, a Joint Federal Task Force supported primarily by the Federal Bureau of Investigation, which includes Agent Olivia Dunham, Dr. Walter Bishop, the archetypal mad scientist, and Peter Bishop, Walter's estranged son and jack-of-all-trades. They are supported by Phillip Broyles (Lance Reddick), the force's director, and Agent Astrid Farnsworth (Jasika Nicole), originally Dunham's assistant, who assists Walter in laboratory research. The Fringe Division investigates cases relating to fringe science, ranging from transhumanist experiments gone wrong to the prospect of a destructive technological singularity to a possible collision of two parallel universes. The Fringe Division's work often intersects with advanced biotechnology developed by a company called Massive Dynamic, founded by Walter's former partner, Dr. William Bell (Leonard Nimoy), and run by their common friend, Nina Sharp (Blair Brown). The team is also watched silently by a group of bald, pale white men who are called "Observers".

== Overview ==
Season 1 introduces the Fringe Division as they investigate cases that form "the Pattern" geographically centered around Reiden Lake in New York state, many of which are orchestrated by an international network of rogue scientists known as ZFT (Zerstörung durch Fortschritte der Technologie, or in English, Destruction through Advancement of Technology), led by David Robert Jones (Jared Harris), who are preparing for a doomsday event. The ZFT threat appears to end when Peter kills Jones as he attempts travel to a parallel universe. Olivia comes to learn she was a child test subject for Walter years ago (then known as Olive) for a nootropic drug, Cortexiphan, giving her weak psionic abilities. Walter also struggles with adjusting to normal life in Peter's care after living seventeen years in a mental institution.

In Season 2, the occurrences are found to be in conjunction with activities of a parallel universe, which is plagued by singularities occurring at weakened points of the fabric between worlds; over there, scientists have developed an amber-like substance that isolates these singularities as well as any innocent people caught in the area on its release. The Fringe team deals with more cases that are leading to a "great storm" as the parallel universe appears to be at war with the prime one, engineered by human-machine hybrid shapeshifters from the parallel universe. Walter is forced to tell Peter that he is from the parallel universe, a replacement for his own Peter, who died from a genetic disease. Walter had crossed over on the frozen ice of Reiden Lake in 1985 to administer the cure for the alternate version of Peter, but, after accidentally destroying a dose of the cure upon transport, he instead brought the boy across. On return, they fell through the ice but were saved by the Observer September (Michael Cerveris), who told Walter of the importance of "the boy", which Walter took to mean Peter. Walter's crossing is what caused the singularities in the parallel universe, with Reiden Lake at their center. Walter has been looking for a sign of forgiveness in the form of a white tulip.

Season 3 presents episodes that alternate between the two universes. "Walternate", Walter's doppelgänger in the parallel universe, is the U.S. Secretary of Defense and has set events in motion to assemble the Machine, a doomsday device that reacts only to Peter's biology. He also sent his Olivia, "Fauxlivia"^{2}, to the prime universe, in Olivia's place, to engage the Fringe Division and assemble the prime universe's version of the device, while he studies Olivia's Cortexiphan-induced powers. By happenstance, Fauxlivia becomes pregnant with Peter's child, Henry, before being outed and extracted to the parallel universe. Walternate orchestrated acceleration of the pregnancy to gain a sample of the baby's blood, which he uses to activate the machine. Peter, with Olivia's help, enters the prime version of the machine, and experiences a vision of the future where the parallel universe has been destroyed and the same fate threatens the prime one, and learns the Machine is really a device created by Walter and his associates from this future, sent back in time purposely to relay this vision of the future to Peter. Recovering in the present, Peter alters his plan and uses the Machine to merge the two rooms, creating a bridge where inhabitants of both universes can solve their dilemma, before time is re-written so September (The Observer) does not save him and is forgotten by both Walter and Olivia.

Season 4 begins in an alternate timeline, one in which September had failed to save the alternate version of Peter in 1985, according to the Observers. This creates a butterfly effect influencing the main characters' pasts but otherwise stabilizing both universes due to the creation of the bridge. Peter is pulled into this new timeline due to the actions of the alternate timeline's Fringe team, which includes Lincoln Lee (Seth Gabel). Peter initially works to return to his own timeline, fueled by fears that his memories are altering Cortexiphan-dosed Olivia's of this timeline, but after encountering a wounded September, Peter comes to learn that this timeline is truly his home, and both he and Olivia come to accept the change, rekindling their affair. September also reveals to Peter that the Observers needed to erase Peter's son, Henry, to assure their future will be created, though noting that Peter's future child with Olivia will be important. Meanwhile, in the present, William Bell has instructed David Robert Jones, alive in this timeline, to work with the parallel universe's version of Nina Sharp to synchronize the two universes, aiming to collapse them both and pave the way for a third universe under Bell's control, using Olivia's Cortexiphan powers to enable the collapse. The Fringe division is forced to close the dimensional bridge, but this fails to stop Bell's plan. Walter is left with one choice, to shoot and kill Olivia, her death disrupting the process and saving the world. Olivia's "death" is only temporary, as the Cortexiphan in her body is consumed to repair the bullet wound, leaving her alive and healthy but lacking her psionic abilities. As Olivia and Peter begin their lives together, September appears to Walter and warns that the Observers "are coming".

The fifth and final season begins in 2036, following from the flash-forward fourth-season episode "Letters of Transit". As September warned, Observers, bald white males from the far future, having ruined Earth for themselves, time-traveled to 2015 and instituted "The Purge", wiped out much of humanity, subjected the survivors to their control, and began modifying the planet's environment to be more suitable for themselves. The Fringe team was able to seal themselves in amber to avoid capture shortly after the Purge, and are reunited through Henrietta ("Etta") (Georgina Haig), Peter and Olivia's now adult daughter who disappeared shortly after the Observer arrival in 2015. Walter reveals he and September developed a plan to defeat the Observers, revealed through a series of pre-recorded videotapes ambered in the lab. The tapes lead to several components of a device, including a young Observer child, named Michael (Spencer List in Season 1 and Rowan Longworth in Season 5), but further allude to a man named Donald that had helped Walter prepare the plan. Etta is killed during these events, driving Olivia and Peter to complete the plan for her sake. Through Michael, they discover Donald is September, having been stripped of his Observer powers for helping the Fringe team, and that Michael is his genetic son, having been purposely grown as an anomaly in the far future. September explains the plan is to send Michael to the year 2167, where human genetic experiments to sacrifice emotion for intelligence would be started and leading to the creation of the Observers; by showing them Michael, who possesses both emotion and intelligence, the experiments would be stopped and the Observers never created. September is prepared to take Michael to the future as the plan is set in motion, but he is shot and killed at the last moment; Walter, already made aware that he will have to make a sacrifice, takes Michael through to the future to assure the plan's completion. As predicted, time is reset from the invasion onwards in 2015; the Observers never invade, and Peter, Olivia, and Etta live their lives peacefully—though Peter receives one final letter from his father: a drawing of a white tulip.

== Mythology ==
=== Parallel universe ===
One of Fringe's location titles. In this example, from "Olivia", the episode takes place in the alternate universe's version of Manhattan, whose name is spelled with only one T. One notable difference in the alternate universe is that while the September 11 attacks occurred, the World Trade Center towers were not destroyed, but the White House was.

Much of the story arc for Fringe involves a parallel universe that mostly mirrors the prime universe, but with numerous historical idiosyncrasies. A significant example element used is the effect of the September 11 attacks; though this event also occurred in the alternate universe, the World Trade Center was untouched by the attacks, leaving the buildings as predominant landmarks in the alternate world's skyline of "Manhatan". The South Tower was used as the office of William Bell in several episodes.

The producers were strongly interested in "world-building", and the alternate universe allowed them to create a very similar world with a large amount of detail to fill in the texture of the world. An alternate universe also allowed them to show "how small choices that you make define you as a person and can change your life in large ways down the line," according to co-director Jeff Pinkner. However, the producers also realized the concept of the alternate universe could confuse viewers. To avoid this, they introduced elements of the world in small pieces over the course of the first two seasons before the larger revelation in the second-season finale and the third season. J. H. Wyman stated that he would often pass the story ideas for the alternate universe by his father to see if it made sense, and would rework the script if his father found it confusing. Such world building also gave them a risky opportunity to create stories that focused solely on characters from the alternate universe with nearly no ties to the main characters; as stated by Wyman, they would be able to "make two shows about one show," a concept that the network executives embraced.

=== Glyph code ===
Marketing posters used to promote the series often featured one of the glyphs used in the show's interstitial, each being a twist on a common image. Pictured here is a leaf with an embedded Greek capital letter delta.

Prior to commercial breaks, a brief image of a glyph is shown. Abrams revealed in an interview that the glyphs had a hidden meaning. "It's something that we're doing for people who care to figure it out and follow it, but it's not something that a viewer has to consider when they watch the show." Abrams also revealed that the seemingly unrelated frogs which have the Greek letter Phi (Φ) imprinted on their backs appeared in promos for the show and have significance within the context of the series, saying "it's part of the code of the show." The glyph code was cracked by Julian Sanchez, then working as an editor at the technology site Ars Technica, who discovered it to be a simple substitution cipher used to spell out a single thematic word for each episode; for example, the pilot episode's eight glyphs spell out the word "observer". Additionally, the glyphs are representative of some of the means by which Walter solves a case (such as the moth/butterfly from "Johari Window", the seahorse strain of DNA from "The Bishop Revival"). In "Jacksonville", behind Walter as he speaks to Olivia about her treatment where the nootropic Cortexiphan was first studied as a trial, each of the glyphs is clearly visible on the daycare wall. An episode-by-episode key to the various glyphs was made available on Fringepedia.

=== Opening sequence ===
The show's standard opening sequence interplays images of the glyph symbols alongside words representing fringe science topics, such as "teleportation" and "dark matter." Within the third season, with episodes that took place primarily in the parallel universe, a new set of titles was used, following a similar format, though tinted red instead of blue and using alternate fringe science concepts like "hypnosis" and "neuroscience". The difference in color has led some fans to call the prime universe the Blue one in contrast to the parallel Red one. In the third-season episode "Entrada", the titles used a mix of both the blue- and red-tinted versions, given that the episode took place equally in each universe. In the two flashback episodes, "Peter" and "Subject 13," a variation on the sequence, with retro graphics akin to 1980s technology and phrases like "personal computing" and "genetic engineering" was used. For the dystopian future third-season episode "The Day We Died," a black-toned theme with more dire phrases like "hope" and "water" was used. The fourth-season premiere, "Neither Here Nor There", introduced an amber-toned title sequence, with additional new terms, that is used for nearly all fourth-season episodes. The fourth-season episode "Letters of Transit," which returned to the future dystopian universe, and the subsequent fifth-season episodes, feature a cold-toned title sequence with phrases such as "joy," "private thought," "free will," and "freedom," ideas which have been lost in this future. There is one frame in the opening sequence in which the words "Observers are here" flash very quickly, and the opening sequence must be paused to see them.

== Cast and characters ==
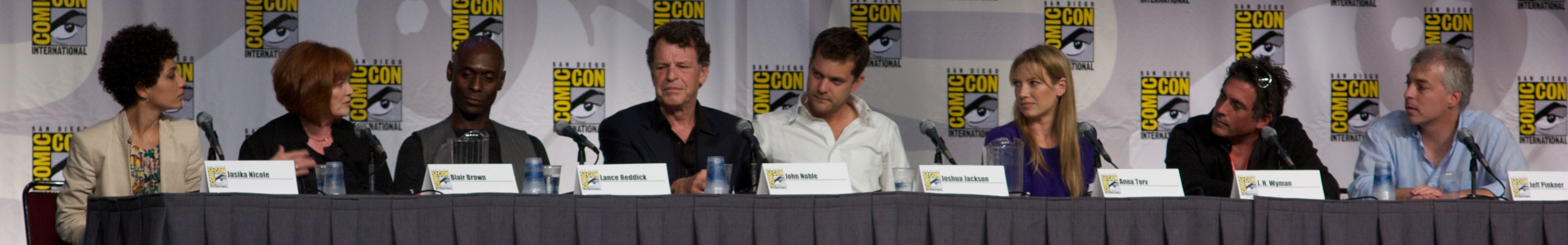
The cast and crew of Fringe at the 2010 San Diego Comic-Con. From left to right: Jasika Nicole (Astrid Farnsworth), Blair Brown (Nina Sharp), Lance Reddick (Phillip Broyles), John Noble (Walter Bishop), Joshua Jackson (Peter Bishop), Anna Torv (Olivia Dunham), and executive producers J. H. Wyman and Jeff Pinkner

=== Main ===
- Anna Torv as Olivia Dunham: a Northwestern University-educated Federal Bureau of Investigation (FBI) agent assigned to investigate the spread of unexplained phenomena. She later discovers Walter performed tests on her when she was a child using nootropic drug Cortexiphan, giving her unusual abilities. Torv also plays Olivia's counterpart in the parallel universe, dubbed by the characters of the prime universe as "Fauxlivia", as well as William Bell.
- Joshua Jackson as Peter Bishop: a jack of all trades who is brought in as a civilian consultant by Olivia to work with his estranged father, Walter. Peter is actually "Walternate's" son from the alternate universe, abducted by Walter shortly after his own Peter's death at a young age.
- Lance Reddick as Phillip Broyles (seasons 1–4; recurring season 5): a Homeland Security agent and Senior-Agent-in-Charge (SAC) who runs Fringe Division. Reddick also portrays Broyles' alternate (known as Colonel Broyles), who finds sympathy for Olivia and sacrifices himself during the third season to allow her to escape the parallel universe. In the fourth season's alternate timeline, Colonel Broyles remains alive.
- Kirk Acevedo as Charlie Francis (seasons 1–2; recurring season 3): An FBI senior agent, Olivia's colleague and close friend, and the second-in-command of Fringe Division before his demise. Though Charlie is killed early in the second season, Acevedo reprises the role of Charlie in the alternate universe.
- Blair Brown as Nina Sharp (seasons 1–4; recurring season 5): the Chief Operating Officer of Massive Dynamic, a leading firm in science and technology research and longtime friend of Walter and William. She also plays her doppelganger in the parallel universe within the alternate timeline of season 4 as an agent for David Robert Jones' plans.
- Jasika Nicole as Astrid Farnsworth: an FBI Junior Agent and assistant to Olivia and Walter. Astrid's counterpart in the alternate universe, who has behaviors similar to autism, is also played by Nicole.
- Mark Valley as John Scott (season 1): Olivia's former FBI partner and secret lover, whose death in "Pilot" leads Olivia to join the Fringe division.
- John Noble as Dr. Walter Bishop: a former government researcher in the field of fringe science who was seen as a mad scientist and institutionalized after a lab accident in which his assistant was killed. Noble also portrays the Walter's alternate, dubbed "Walternate" by the characters in the prime universe. Walternate rose to power as the U.S. Secretary of Defense and instigated the war against the prime universe after the abduction of his son Peter.
- Seth Gabel as Lincoln Lee (season 4; guest seasons 2 and 5; recurring season 3): an agent of the parallel universe Fringe Division. The prime universe version of Lincoln, also played by Gabel, was introduced in the episode "Stowaway" as a special agent stationed at the FBI building in Hartford, Connecticut, later joining Fringe division within season 4.

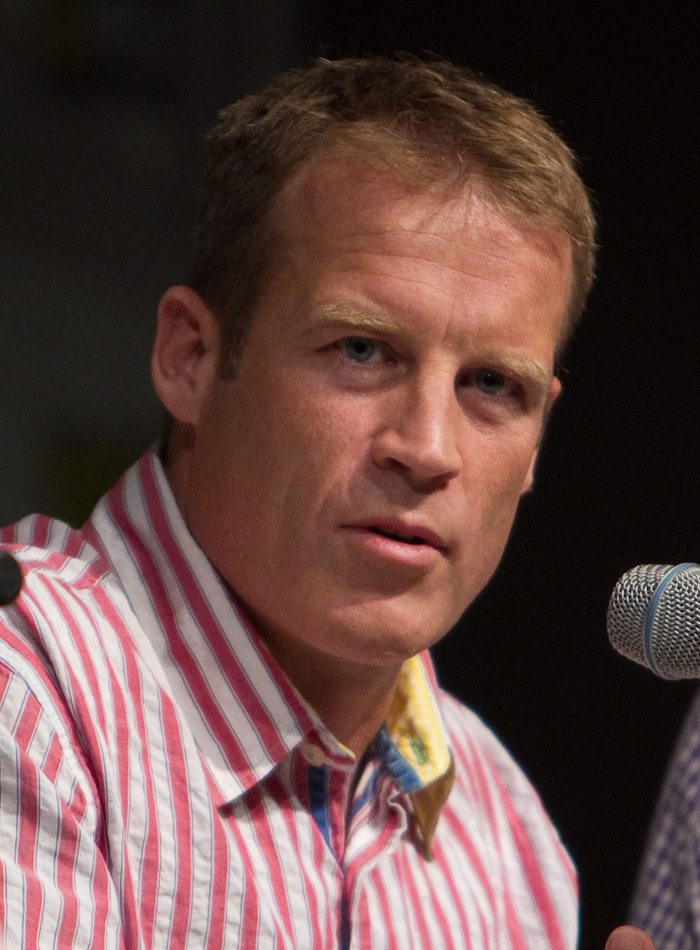
Mark Valley played Olivia's partner and lover, John Scott, in the first season.

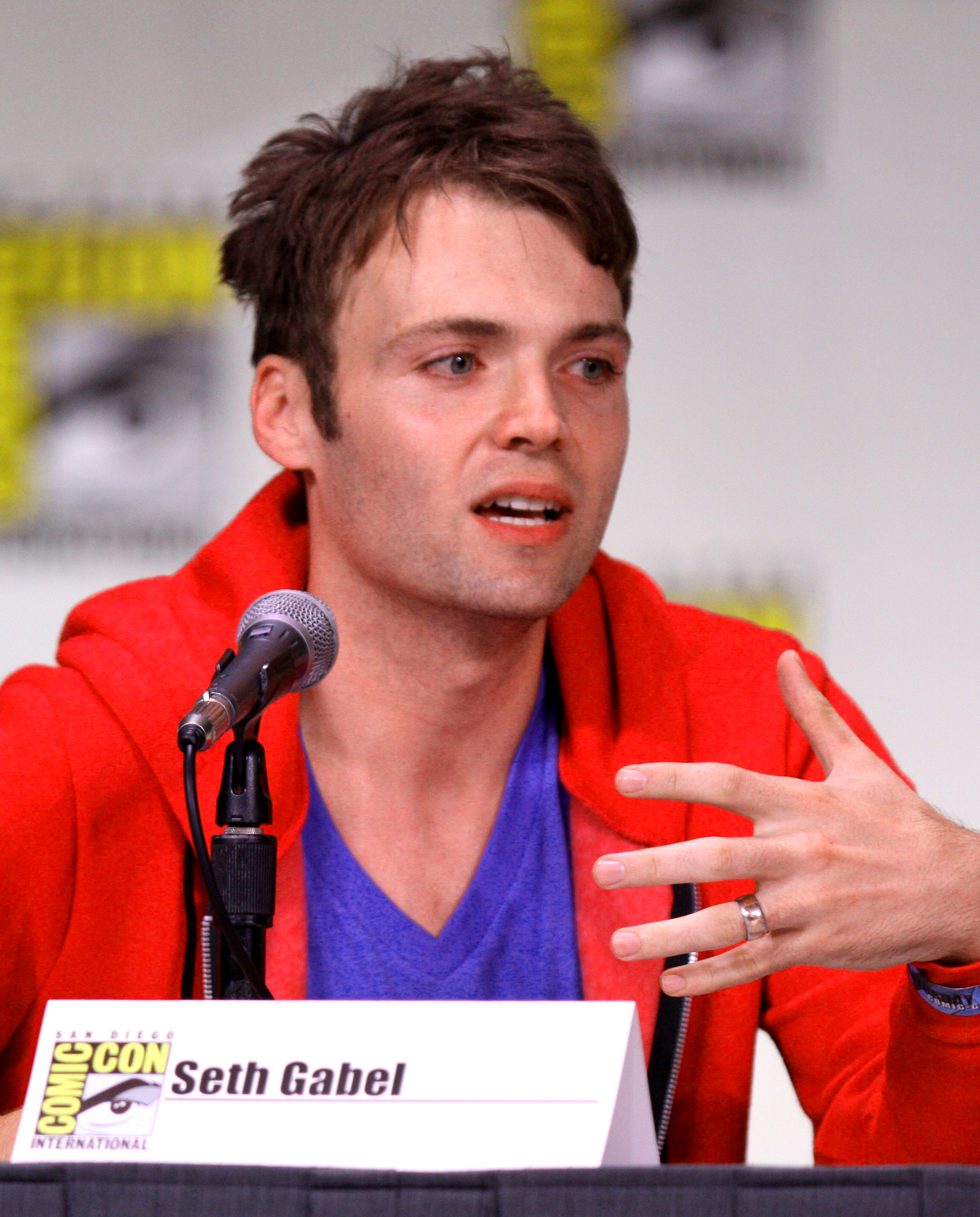
Seth Gabel, a guest star during seasons 2 and 3, joined Fringe as a series regular in season 4 as agent Lincoln Lee. He reappears in season 5.

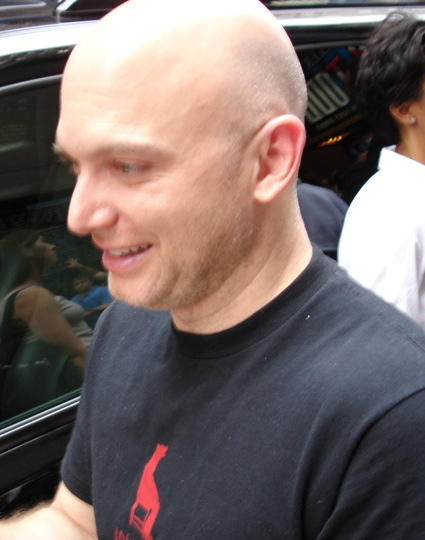
Michael Cerveris plays September, one of the bald-headed Observers, and appears several times throughout the series.

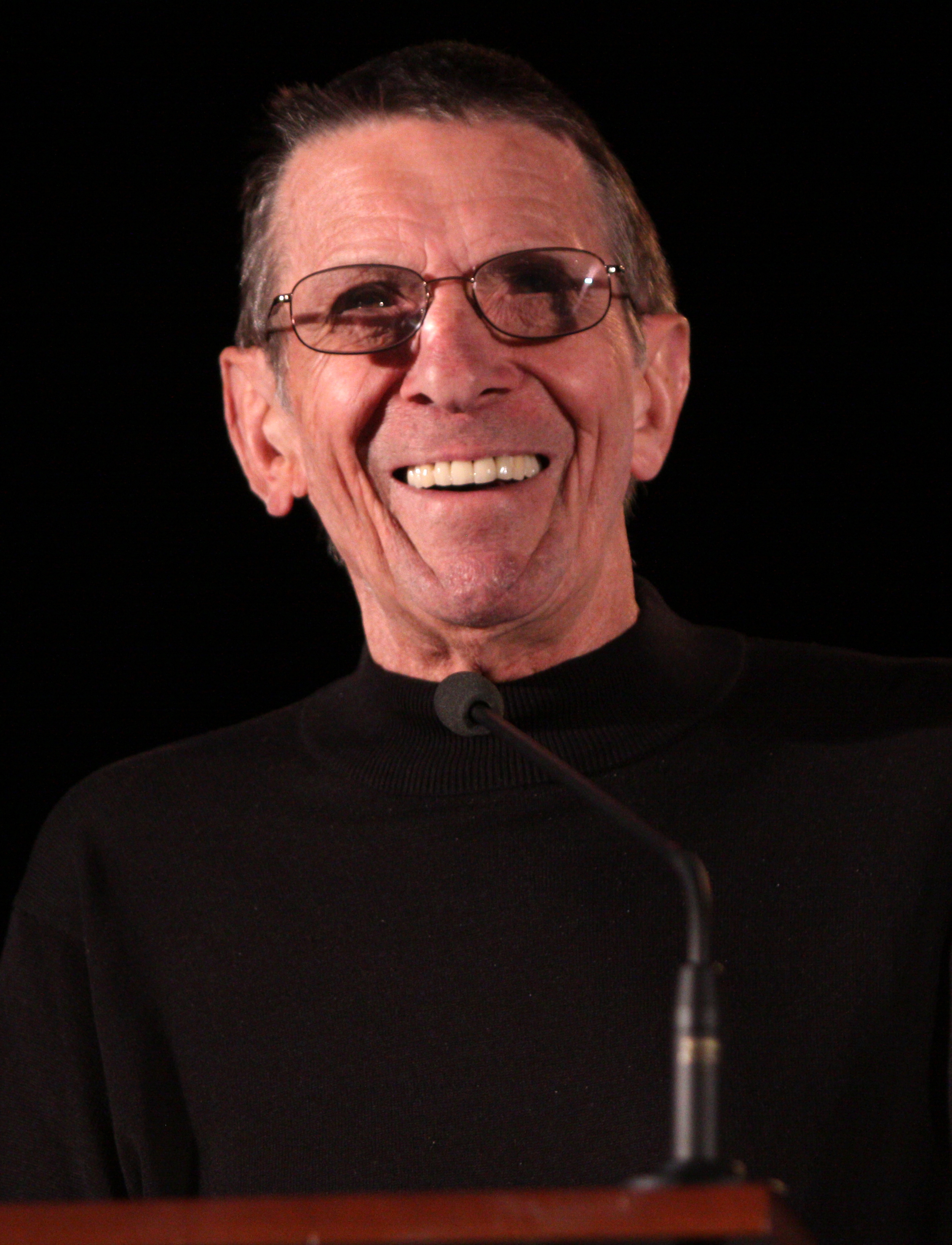
Leonard Nimoy portrays William Bell, Walter's associate, both as a live action character in seasons 1, 2, and 4, and voicing an animated Bell in season 3.

=== Recurring ===
- Michael Cerveris as September/the Observer/Donald: one of several "Observers," a traveling chronicler and enforcer of extraordinary events. An Observer appears in one form or another, usually in an Alfred Hitchcock-like cameo, in each episode.
- Clark Middleton as Edward Markham: A man who operates a bookstore specializing in rare collectables. He appears in one episode every season.
- Ari Graynor as Rachel Dunham (seasons 1–2): Olivia's sister.
- Lily Pilblad as Ella Blake (seasons 1–3): Olivia's niece, the daughter of Rachel. Emily Meade portrays the future Ella.
- David Call as Nick Lane (seasons 1–2, 4): Olivia's partner during the experimental trials in her childhood. Liam Mackie also portrays Young Nick in season 3.
- Leonard Nimoy as Dr. William Bell (seasons 1–4): Walter's former lab partner, the founder of Massive Dynamic, apparently killed in the season 2 finale. Nimoy, who had retired from acting after season 2, agreed to provide the voice of Bell, allowing for the character's reappearance via an animated character in season 3. He reappears in season 4 after the timeline is altered.
- Michael Gaston as Sanford Harris (season 1): an old nemesis of Olivia's assigned to assess Fringe Division.
- Jared Harris as David Robert Jones (seasons 1, 4): leader of the ZFT cult, and killed in the season 1 finale. In the alternate timeline Peter is projected into, it appears he is alive, and that the shapeshifters have been working for him.
- Chance Kelly as Mitchell Loeb (season 1): an FBI agent and mole working for ZFT.
- Ryan McDonald as Brandon Fayette (seasons 2–4): a scientist at Massive Dynamic. In the parallel universe, Brandon works directly for Secretary of Defense Bishop, overseeing many of his less ethical projects.
- Kevin Corrigan as Sam Weiss (seasons 2–3): Olivia's Yoda-like amateur psychologist and manager of a Boston-area bowling alley; his family line maintains knowledge of the "First People," a race of intelligent beings believed to have created the doomsday device.
- Karen Holness as Diane Broyles (seasons 2–4): the wife of Colonel Broyles in the parallel universe and ex-wife of General Broyles in the prime universe.
- Sebastian Roché as Thomas Jerome Newton (seasons 2–3): the leader of the shapeshifters, human/machine hybrids and undercover agents from the alternate universe. The character commits suicide during the third season.
- Orla Brady as Elizabeth Bishop (seasons 2–4): Walter's wife and Peter's mother. Brady portrays both the prime and alternate versions.
- Philip Winchester as Frank Stanton (seasons 2–3): a virologist for the CDC and introduced as Fauxlivia's romantic interest in season 2. Their relationship ends off-screen in season 4.
- Michelle Krusiec as Nadine Park (season 4): a shape-shifting soldier from the alternate timeline, with different features from shapeshifters seen in the normal timeline.
- Georgina Haig as Henrietta "Etta" Bishop (seasons 4–5): Peter and Olivia's adult daughter in 2036. Though she is part of the Fringe team, loyal to the Observers, she secretly works with the human resistance to try to reclaim the earth for humans.
- Michael Kopsa as Captain Windmark (seasons 4–5): the lead Observer in 2036 and primary antagonist of the Resistance.

== Development ==
=== Conception ===
Co-created by J. J. Abrams, Roberto Orci and Alex Kurtzman, Fringe was produced by Bad Robot in association with Warner Bros. Television, as part of a commitment that Abrams previously made with the studio. At the time, Abrams was working with Orci and Kurtzman on the Star Trek film, and met at one of the Comic-Cons during Star Trek's production to brainstorm ideas for the show. Abrams later brought Bryan Burk, a producer on several of his films, to help with developing the series.

Abrams's inspiration for Fringe came from a range of sources, including the writings of Michael Crichton and Robin Cook, the film Altered States, films by David Cronenberg, and the television series The Night Stalker, The X-Files and The Twilight Zone. Orci stated that Fringe is a "new kind of storytelling", combining procedural shows such as Law & Order, and an "extremely serialized and very culty" series like Lost. The procedural aspect was chosen because, at the time of its premiere, six of the ten top shows were procedural in nature; Orci stated that "you have to be a fool not to go study what it is that they're doing". Abrams had originally considered naming the series The Lab, as they had envisioned Walter's laboratory to be "the epicenter of the conversation", and where "anything is possible".

Though the team saw this as a way of presenting "mystery of the week"-type episodes, they wanted to focus more on how these stories were told in unpredictable ways rather than the actual mystery, recognizing that most of their target audience has seen such mysteries before through previous shows and films. Instead, they wanted their storytelling to be original and unexpected, and, as claimed by Kurtzman, one of the most challenging aspects of developing the individual episodes. Serialization of the show was important to tell their overall story with larger plot elements, but Abrams recognized the difficulties that his earlier serialized shows, such as Lost and Alias, had in attracting and maintaining viewers that had not seen these shows from the start or who missed episodes sporadically. For Fringe, Abrams instead sought to create, as stated by David Itzkoff of the New York Times, "a show that suggested complexity but was comprehensible in any given episode". The writers aimed to balance a line between stand-alone episodes, a factor requested by Fox, and a heavily serialized show; they balanced these by moving the serialization aspect to the growth and development of their characters. This gave them the ability to write self-contained episodes that still contained elements related to the overall mythos. However, as production continued, the creative staff found the show itself took on a more serialized nature and opted towards this approach in later seasons while still balancing self-contained episodes.

One method was by introducing overarching themes that individual episodes could be tied to, such as "The Pattern" in Season 1, providing information repeatedly about the larger plot over the course of several episodes or seasons. Abrams also created characters whose alliances to the larger narrative were clear, avoiding a similar problem that had occurred during the first and second seasons of Alias. A final step taken was to script out all of the major long-running plot elements, including the show's finale, prior to full-time production. Abrams contrasted this to the process used in Lost, where ideas like character flashbacks and the hatch from the second season were introduced haphazardly and made difficulties in defining when they should be presented to the viewers. Instead, with Fringe, they were able to create "clearly defined goalposts" (in Itzkoff's words) that could be altered as necessary with network and seasonal changes but always provided a clear target for the overarching plot. These approaches also allowed the team to introduce unique plot elements to be introduced in time that would have altered the show's fate if known at the start. Abrams stated that "There are certain details that are hugely important that I believe, if shared, will destroy any chance of actually getting on the air." Abrams noted that they are able to benefit from "how open Fox as a network has been to a show that is embracing the weirdness and the long-term stories that we want to tell". During the third season, executive producer Jeff Pinkner noted that "We have six to eight seasons worth of material. We see it as having certain chapters that would enrich the overall story, but aren't necessary to tell the overall story. God willing, the network allows us the time to tell our complete story."

As part of the larger story, the writers have placed elements in earlier episodes that are referenced in episodes seasons later. For example, in the first-season episode "The Ghost Network", the Fringe team encounters an amber-like substance, which is later shown to be a critical means to combat the breakdown of the parallel universe and eventually for the same in the prime universe with the third-season episode "6B". Pinkner compared this aspect to "planting seeds", some which they know how they plan to use later in the show's story, while others they can find ways of incorporating into these later episodes.

He further attributed these elements as part of the "world building" to flesh out the show beyond episodic content. The producers have stated that when the show's mythology is introduced, it is not simply there to tie episodes together, but "to provide answers that generate consequences".

Certain elements of the show's mythology were established from the start. The parallel universe was always part of the original concept, though aspects of when and how to introduce it were tackled as the show proceeded. The idea of Peter being from the parallel universe came early into the show's production, but this came to lead the team to jokingly refer to Peter as their "hatch", one of the early mysteries in Lost, as with the hatch in Lost, they initially had no idea how to introduce this within the show. FOX's Reilly was also initially concerned about the parallel universe aspect, but as the show progressed into the first season and found its groove, the concept was readily accepted. The most poignant introduction of the parallel universe was in the conclusion of the first-season finale, "There's More Than One of Everything", where they showed the Twin Towers of the World Trade Center were still standing in the parallel universe, a concept introduced by writer Andrew Kreisberg as an iconic image to leave viewers with; Jackson stated, "I don't know that we've ever had a better visual or a better cliff-hanger."

Other mythos elements were devised as the series progressed. The writers had originally envisioned only spending small portions of episodes within the parallel universe, but as they wrote these episodes within Season 3, they brought out the idea of setting entire episodes within the parallel universe. This necessitated the development of the alternate versions of the main characters, which Pinkner considered "a great playground just for imagination". The actors themselves found this concept exciting, as it allowed them to play different characters but with the same background and considered it a creative challenge. Similarly, having Peter erased from the timeline as part of the finale for Season 3 was an idea that grew over the course of that season. The writers were aware this would be a risky move but felt the idea was very appropriate for Fringe, and opted to write towards this after considering all the consequences. Pinkner noted that this gave them an opportunity to "reset the character relationships" and determine the key aspects that would remain without Peter, as well as "making the audience uncomfortable at times". The cast was not initially sold with the idea, but came around as the fourth season progressed.

=== Production ===
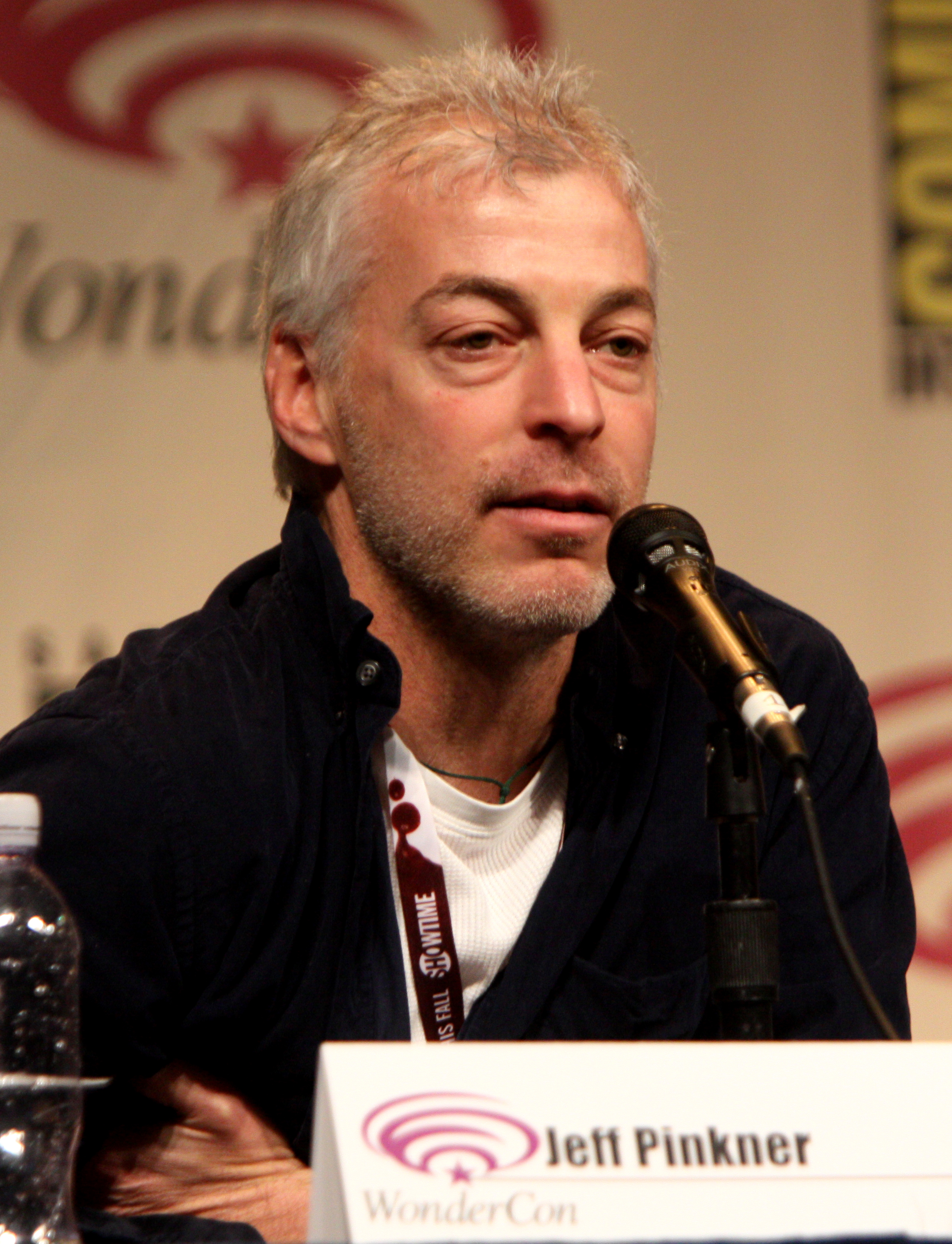
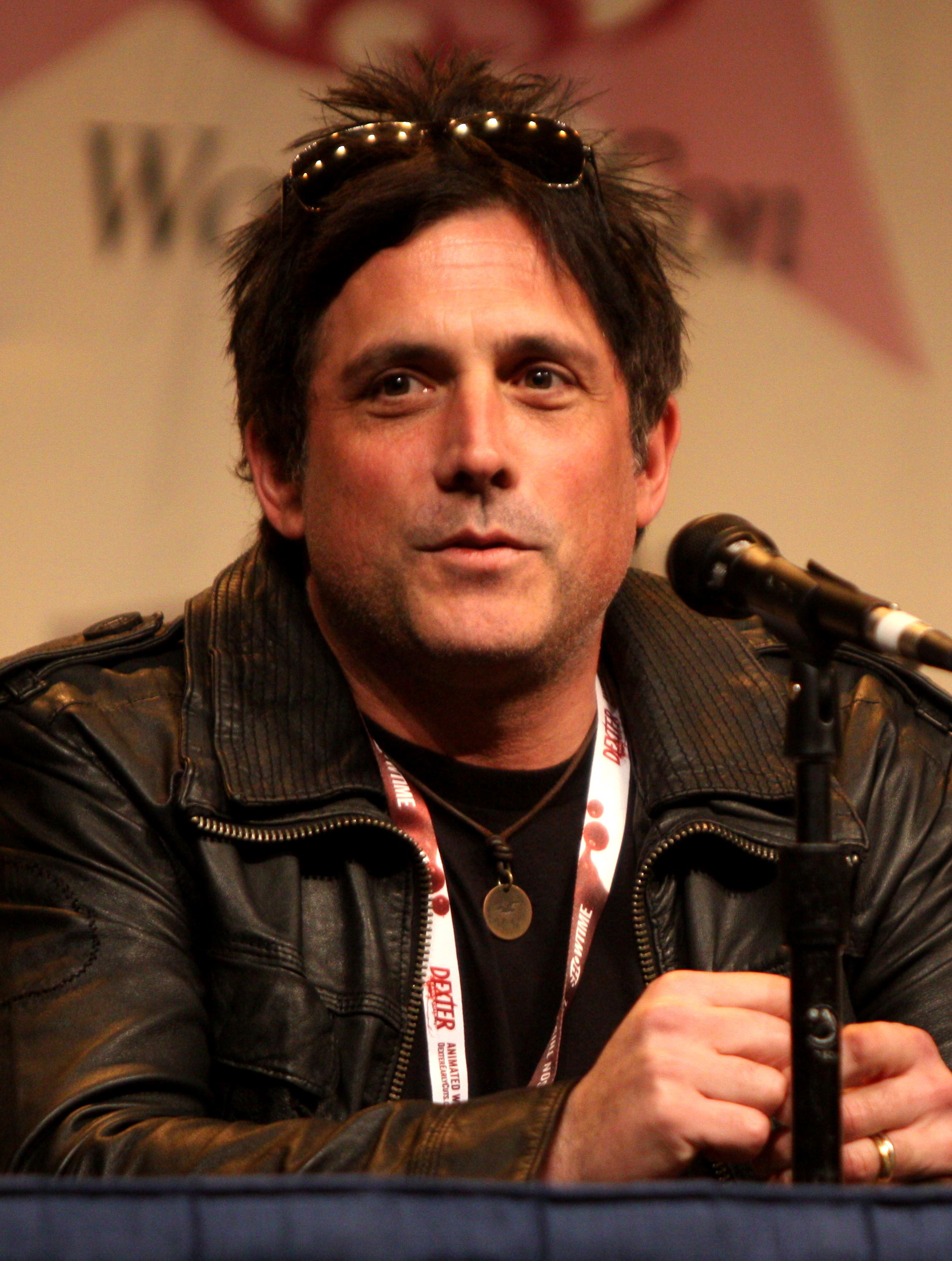
Jeff Pinkner (left) and/or J. H. Wyman (right) served as showrunners for the entirety of the series.

Showrunners
Season	Showrunner
1	Jeff Pinkner
2–4	Jeff Pinkner and J.H. Wyman
5	J.H. Wyman

After developing the core concepts of the show, Abrams began to seek studios to develop the show; Abrams' past successes led to Warner Bros. Television and the Fox Television Network to quickly jump on board the project. Peter Roth, the chief executive of Warner Bros. Television, had been actively seeking to bring any Abrams' project to his studio, and heard Abrams' pitch for Fringe at a dinner meeting in August 2007. Similarly, Kevin Reilly, the entertainment chairman at Fox, knew that it was critical for him to bring the next Abrams' project to his network, and worked with Roth to assure this would happen.

Jeff Pinkner was selected to act as the head showrunner and executive producer. Abrams noted that he trusts Pinkner after working together with him on Alias and Lost. Pinkner became interested in the show during a visit to the set of Star Trek, during which Abrams was discussing the concept of Fringe with Orci and Kurtzman, knowing that they would not be involved in the direct production of the work. Abrams pitched the idea to Pinkner, who was intrigued by the importance of characters in a science fiction drama. In season two, J.H. Wyman was brought on as executive producer and showrunner with Pinkner. Wyman had been a science fiction enthusiast but had worried that he had not written anything in that genre but after learning about the concept of the show, felt his role as an executive producer was "a match made in heaven".

Michael Giacchino, Abrams' frequent collaborator, composed the music for the pilot of Fringe, before handing over duties to his assistants Chad Seiter and Chris Tilton; Tilton took over scoring duties from Season 2 onward. While Giacchino retains an on-screen credit, Abrams himself wrote the series theme music.

The two-hour pilot episode, filmed in Toronto, Ontario, Canada, cost a total of $10 million to create. A basement of an old church was used for Walter's lab set in the pilot, and this set was replicated at other film sites in New York and Vancouver when the show moved. The lab set was designed by Carol Spier, the production designer for several of Cronenberg's films. John Noble called his character's lab "the heart and soul of Fringe", so consequently, "That has to remain constant." A cow used in the pilot episode had to be recast when production of Season 1 was moved to New York, due to livestock restrictions preventing her from being brought from Canada to the United States. Other locations used in the first season included other universities to stage for the Harvard University campus, where Walter's lab is located. These included Pratt Institute and Yale University, including its Old Campus (particularly Phelps Hall and Durfee Hall), Branford College, and the exterior of Yale Law School, University of Toronto's University College, Brooklyn College.

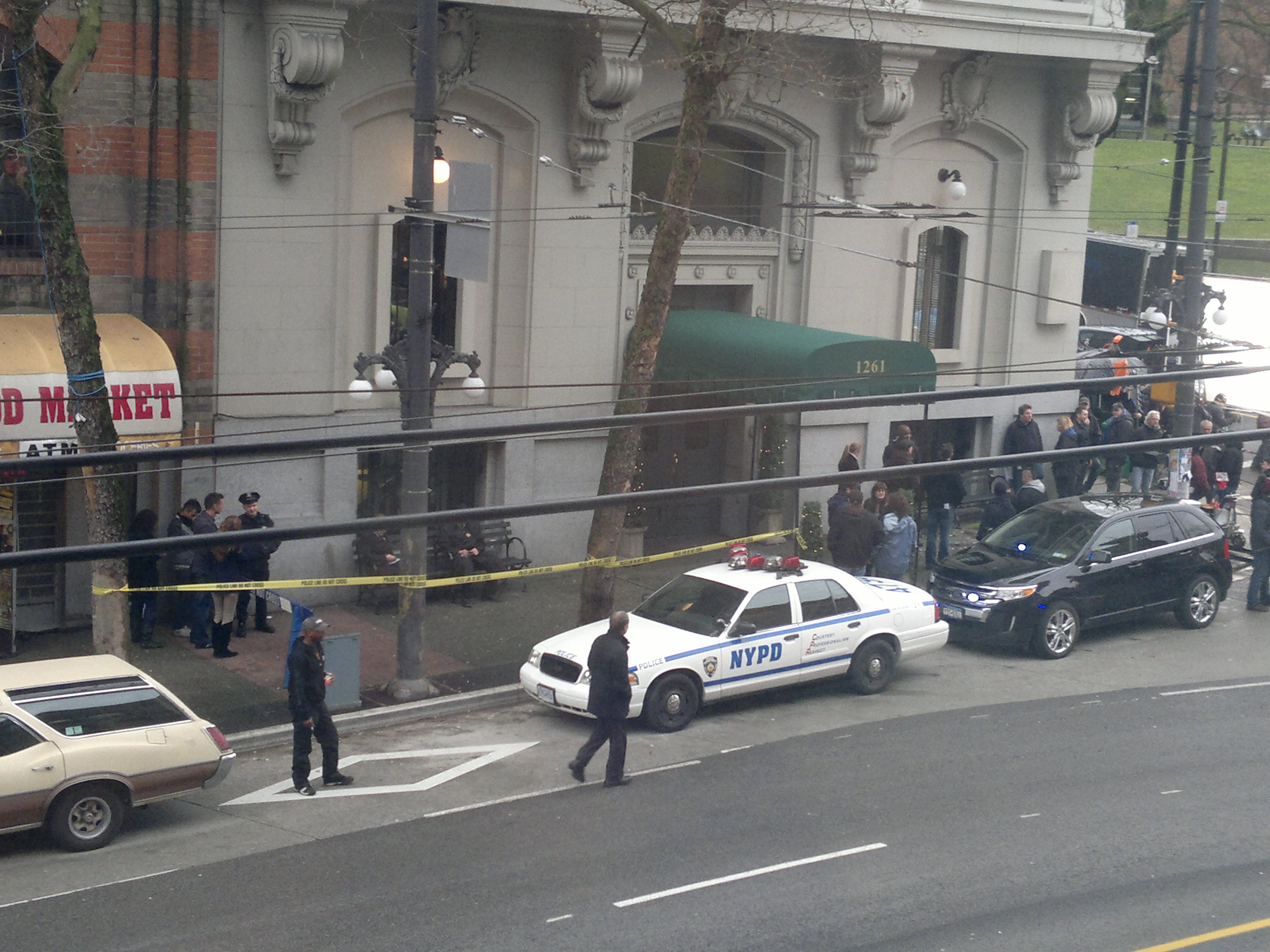
Filming of the Fringe episode "6B" in December 2010 at the Vancouver Film School building at Hastings and Cambie streets in Vancouver, staged as New York City

On February 21, 2009, it was reported that in the event that Fringe would be renewed for a second season, the show would move production to Vancouver from New York City as a cost-cutting measure. Executive producer Jeff Pinkner explained:

We want to stay in New York, New York has been incredibly good to us. It feels like we're being kicked out of the city. I know we're not, but they're making it impossible for us to afford doing the show ... Our New York crew is spectacular, they've worked their [butts] off to make the show look great. But it looks like New York is not renewing a tax credit that makes it possible to make our budget in New York. So it looks like, out of necessity, we'll have to leave New York, which is not anything we are welcoming.

As plans were being made to move the production to Canada, the New York state legislature passed continuation of the film and tax credits, as planned. Upon productions moving to Vancouver, British Columbia, Canada for season 2, the University of British Columbia now stands in for Harvard. The area around New Westminster often serves as filming locations for Fringe stories that take place in the parallel universe.

Prior to the start of production for the fifth season, Pinkner announced that he was leaving the production of the show to pursue other projects; Wyman would remain as the sole showrunner for the show.

=== Casting ===
The show's main characters, Olivia, Peter, and Walter, were at the core of the concept for Fringe. The creators recognized early that "the idea that telling a father-son story and a relationship story was a really compelling one and a very accessible one", according to Kurtzman. They were able to provide the characters with backstories that, like with other long-term plot elements, could be alluded to over several episodes and seasons.

The characters would also contrast with the typical procedural genre show; rather than having clearly defined roles episode to episode, they instead "have an emotional memory and an emotional investment", as stated by Orci. This also allowed for, as necessary, characters to be removed or introduced to the show and have a larger impact on the other characters.

The first actors cast were Kirk Acevedo and Mark Valley, who portrayed FBI agents Charlie Francis and John Scott, respectively. John Noble and Lance Reddick, who play Dr. Walter Bishop and Homeland Security agent Phillip Broyles, joined the cast later on. Casting of Anna Torv, Blair Brown, and Jasika Nicole, who play Olivia Dunham, Massive Dynamic employee Nina Sharp, and Astrid Farnsworth, a federal agent and assistant to Olivia Dunham, respectively, followed; while Joshua Jackson, who plays Peter Bishop, was the last main character to be cast. Jackson auditioned for James T. Kirk in Abrams' Star Trek and believed this is what impressed the producer to cast him in his television project, though Abrams later clarified that it was recalling his previous experience with working with Jackson on his television series Felicity. For the principal and recurring actors, they were all intrigued by the script for the pilot, comparing it to a two-hour-long movie, as well as Abrams' reputation.

On April 8, 2009, it was announced that Leonard Nimoy would appear as Walter Bishop's former lab partner, Dr. William Bell, in the first season's finale, which explores the existence of an ominous parallel universe. This choice led one reviewer to question if Fringe's plot might be a homage to the Star Trek episode "Mirror, Mirror", which explored the concept of an alternate reality referred to as a "mirror universe", and an evil version of Spock distinguished by a goatee. Nimoy returned as Dr. Bell for an extended arc, and according to Orci, Bell is "the beginning of the answers to even bigger questions." Nimoy reprised his role in the second-season finale, where his character and Walter met for a "showdown". Nimoy's character is apparently dead after the season finale, having used himself to help Walter, Peter and the Alternate Olivia back to the prime universe. As he had retired from acting, it was thought unlikely that his character would return. In February 2011 however, he announced his definite plan to return to Fringe and reprise his role as William Bell. He returned to voice the character in the animated segments of the third-season episode "Lysergic Acid Diethylamide", and appeared as a computer-generated character in the fourth-season episode "Letters of Transit". In the two-part finale of the fourth season, Nimoy returned to play the ultimate antagonist of the alternate timeline story arc.

== Reception ==
Early reception through the first season was generally lukewarm, with many noting its "lackluster" start and the "dullness" of the characters. However, changes in the approach and storytelling of the show in the second and subsequent seasons led to more positive critical reception and made it a media favorite. As a whole, the series was well received by the critics and has developed a cult following.

=== First season ===
The pilot episode was watched by 9.13 million viewers, garnering 3.2/9 Nielsen ratings among adults 18–49, with ratings improving over the course of the episode. Ratings improved greatly for the second episode, "The Same Old Story" which 13.27 million people watched, making it the fifth most watched show of the week. As of October 2008, the show had achieved the first place in the 18–49 demographic among new shows. Barry Garron at The Hollywood Reporter found it promising and "reminiscent of battle-of-the-sexes charm." Robert Bianco, of USA Today, said, "What Abrams brings to Fringe is a director's eye for plot and pace, a fan's love of sci-fi excitement, and a story-teller's gift for investing absurd events with real emotions and relatable characters." Travis Fickett of IGN gave it 7.6 out of 10, calling it "a lackluster pilot that promises to be a pretty good series". While Tim Goodman of the San Francisco Chronicle remarked that it was "boundlessly ambitious", Chicago Sun-Times's Misha Davenport called it an "update of The X-Files with the addition of terrorism and the office of Homeland Security". In a 2016 retrospective of the series, A.V. Club writer Joshua Alston noted that the similarities to The X-Files, including the "monster of the week" approach and tepid romance between two of the series' lead characters, as well as the relatively recent release of The X-Files: I Want to Believe, had turned audiences off the show since "it was retreading what The X-Files had already done."

In its 2008 Year in Review, Television Without Pity declared Fringe one of the year's biggest TV disappointments, commenting that the show is "entertaining" and "the cast is largely strong" but the character development is insufficient, and describing main character Olivia Dunham as "wooden and distant." Meanwhile, in other articles recounting the best and worst of 2008, The New York Times stated that Fringe "is the best of a rash of new series that toy with the paranormal". The author goes on to praise the cast saying that "Much credit belongs to Anna Torv who stars as an F.B.I. agent investigating bizarre murders that all appear to be linked to a powerful and mysterious multinational corporation", and "Ms. Torv is backed up ably by John Noble as a crazy but brilliant fringe scientist and his level-headed but skeptical son, played by Joshua Jackson".

The first season holds an 85% approval rating on review aggregator Rotten Tomatoes, based on 26 critic reviews. The website's critics consensus reads, "Action-packed, suspenseful, and filled with intriguing twists, Fringe is a smart sci-fi series that's compelling enough to overcome its occasionally uneven plotting."

=== Subsequent seasons ===
Seasons of Fringe after the first season were seen as vast improvements on the first. Entertainment Weekly stated, "The best new show of the year took a few weeks to grow on me, but now it's a full-blown addiction." The Los Angeles Times called Walter Bishop one of the best characters of 2008, noting, "the role of the modern-day mad scientist could so easily have been a disaster, but the 'Fringe' writers and the masterful John Noble have conspired to create a character that seems, as trite as it sounds, more Shakespearean than sci-fi."

Chicago Tribune stated that some episodes are "distressingly predictable and formulaic" but adds that there have also been some excellent episodes. The New York Times named Fringe one of the top 10 television shows in 2010, while Television Without Pity, previously dismissive of the show, listed it amongst their 2010 "Most Memorable TV Moments", stating "there were so many great Fringe moments this year" and "we were treated to some of the best sci-fi on television this past fall".

The A.V. Club named Fringe the 15th best show of 2010, stated that the episode "Peter" gave "the series' overarching storyline a devastating emotional core", making the series a "rare blend of inventive ideas, wild ambition, and unexpected soulfulness". IGN named Fringe the 18th best science fiction show of all time in a 2011 listing, stating that since the middle of the first season, "it's been nothing but a series of satisfyingly jaw-dropping 'holy eff!' moments layered with wonderful, nuanced performances from Anna Torv, Joshua Jackson and John Noble".

In 2012, Entertainment Weekly listed the show at No. 17 in the "25 Best Cult TV Shows from the Past 25 Years", saying, "Fringe was conceived as a mass-appeal genre procedural, with a background mythology that wouldn't detract from monster-of-the-week episodes. ... But the mythology overtook the monsters following the revelation of a parallel universe. By its third season, Fringe was overpopulated by multiple versions of every character. Unfortunately, that increasing narrative complexity has steadily pigeonholed it as a niche show."

In 2015, Bustle declared "White Tulip" as "one of the greatest hours in television history". He wrote, "'White Tulip' is an hour of television that shouldn't work, that technically doesn't even exist ... but thank god it does, because it's one of the most powerful episodes ever created — and it showcases why Fringe is one of the most criminally underrated series of our time."

On review aggregator Rotten Tomatoes, the second season holds an 82% approval rating based on 17 critic reviews. The website's critics consensus reads, "Fringe surpasses expectations in season two with stronger character development while maintaining its creepy sci-fi angle." The third season holds a 100% approval rating based on 14 reviews, with the critics consensus stating, "With more mysteries to uncover and mind-bending plot devices, season three of Fringe further cements the show's status as one of the ... best science fiction shows on television." The fourth season holds a 100% approval rating based on 13 reviews, with the critics consensus stating, "A daring reset may baffle casual viewers, but those already enthralled by Fringe's knotty mythology will likely become even more invested." The fifth and final season holds an 88% approval rating based on 17 reviews. The critics consensus reads, "Fringe overcomes a compressed episode count and humbled production values to deliver a moving and rousing conclusion to its fans."

=== U.S. ratings and series renewal history ===
Seasonal U.S. rankings (based on total viewers per episode including reruns) of Fringe on Fox
Season	Timeslot (ET)	Episodes	Premiered		Ended		Rank	Viewers (in millions)
Season	Timeslot (ET)	Episodes	Date	Premiere viewers (in millions)	Date	Finale viewers (in millions)	Rank	Viewers (in millions)
Season 1	Tuesday 9:00 p.m.	20	September 9, 2008	9.13	May 12, 2009	9.28	#41	10.02
Season 2	Thursday 9:00 p.m. Monday 9:00 p.m. ("Unearthed" only)	23	September 17, 2009	7.98	May 20, 2010	5.68	#79	6.25
Season 3	Thursday 9:00 p.m. (2010); Friday 9:00 p.m. (2011)	22	September 23, 2010	5.83	May 6, 2011	3.29	#99	5.83
Season 4	Friday 9:00 p.m.	22	September 23, 2011	3.48	May 11, 2012	3.11	#140	4.22
Season 5	Friday 9:00 p.m.	13	September 28, 2012	3.12	January 18, 2013	3.28	#111	4.27

Fringe premiered in the 2008 United States television season at a regular timeslot of 9:00 p.m. Eastern on Tuesdays. During Season 1, Fringe was part of a Fox initiative known as "Remote-Free TV". Episodes of Fringe were longer than standard dramas on current network television. The show ran with half the commercials, adding about six minutes to the show's runtime. When the show went to a commercial, a short bumper aired informing the viewer of roughly how much time commercials would consume before the program resumed. The pilot episode was leaked via BitTorrent, three months before the series premiere; similar to leaked fellow Fox series Terminator: The Sarah Connor Chronicles. The series was renewed for a second season on May 4, 2009, and moved to 9:00 p.m. on Thursday.

It was renewed for a third season on March 6, 2010. As part of a reorganization of its 2010 midseason line up to capture more market for American Idol, the Fox network shifted Fringe to 9:00 p.m. on Fridays. This timeslot, commonly considered the "Friday night death slot" for several previous Fox shows due to cancellation shortly following the move to that slot, left critics considering the show's fate. While The X-Files originally premiered during this slot and would continue to be a highly successful series, critics were unsure if Fringe could duplicate this performance. In this slot, the show competed with Supernatural, a series that attracts similar types of viewers. Fox's Entertainment President Kevin Reilly, in response to these concerns, stated that 45% of Fringe's viewership is from time shifting recording through digital video receivers, and does not expect the viewership numbers to change significantly with the change to Friday. Reilly further postulated that "If it does anywhere near what it did on Thursdays, we can glue that show to the schedule because it can be a big win for us". Further promoted by the critical reaction to the rescheduling, the Fox network created a self-deprecating promotional advertisement acknowledging the reputation of the time slot, including quotes from other media outlets concerned about the move, but asserted that the move would "re-animate" the show. The network also created a music video, set to "Echoes" by the band Klaxons as a means of summarizing the third season to date prior to the first Friday broadcast. Joshua Jackson, who plays Peter Bishop on the show, cautioned that time-shifted viewership may not be enough to save the show: "It's not that not enough people are watching Fringe, it's that not enough people are watching Fringe during the hour that it's on the air, which is key for the network."

Producers Pinkner and Wyman also were excited about the move to Fridays, considering the slot as "open territory that can be conquered" and that they "can actually deliver like The X-Files did". Series creator Abrams was less optimistic of the move to Friday nights, aware that the show's likelihood to be renewed for a fourth season would be highly dependent on the number of niche viewers that continue to watch the show. Abrams did affirm that moving to Friday nights allows them to take more creative freedoms to maintain viewership in the new timeslot, but feels that if the show was not renewed for another season, they would be "hard pressed" to resolve the story by the end of the third season.

The show's first episode at the Friday 9:00 p.m. timeslot ("The Firefly") scored a 1.9 in the key 18–49 demographic which was an increase of 12% over its last Thursday-aired episode ("Marionette") which scored a 1.7, and maintained similar numbers in the second week for "Reciprocity". Though viewership slipped in further weeks, the show was renewed for a fourth season in March 2011. The move was unexpected based on these ratings, given the past performance of shows with similar viewership numbers in the Friday night slot, but several critics attribute it to the strong fanbase that the show has garnered, which contributes in part to consistently higher time-shifted viewership. Fox's Reilly stated that:

Fringe has truly hit a creative stride and has distinguished itself as one of television's most original programs. The series' ingenious producers, amazingly talented cast and crew, as well as some of the most passionate and loyal fans on the planet, made this fourth-season pickup possible. When we moved the show to Fridays, we asked the fans to follow and they did. We're thrilled to bring it back for another full season and keep it part of the Fox family.

— Kevin Reilly, President of Fox Entertainment

Reilly further added that the renewal was also prompted by the high risk of trying to replace Fringe with another show with unknown viewership metrics; he commented that they "have a far better shot of sticking with a show that has an audience that [they] think [they] can grow". Prior to the onset of the fourth season, Reilly reiterated that they do not expect any significant growth in Fringe's viewership within that season: "It's a pretty complex show. If Fringe can do exactly what Fringe did last year, we're going to be very happy. They're right in the pocket creatively once again." Wyman stated in an interview with The Hollywood Reporter that the Fox network had been "supportive throughout this process", and though the show's viewership "wasn't exactly what they would've hoped for", aspects such as a loyal fan base and supportive critics were enough to take the show forward for another season. Pinkner commented that "there were no creative conditions" on the show's renewal, nor any cuts in the show's budget, though was unsure if the show will be moved to a different time slot. Noble, at the 2011 Comic-Con Fringe panel, reiterated that the fans were responsible for the livelihood of the show, stated, "Seriously, without your efforts, your rabid support, we wouldn't be here right now. You are the best fans that ever existed". The fourth season premiered on September 23, 2011.

Before the renewal of the fifth season, Abrams stated some skepticism for a renewal opportunity, but hoped that if it was cancelled, that it may be picked up by another network. On the other hand, Abrams considered that if Fox did pick up the show for a fifth season, "the next year would be the great ending for the show". Similarly, Fox's Reilly remained cautious about a renewal, noting that while the show is one of the top shows in the Friday night slot, "it's an expensive show. We lose a lot of money on the show." Reilly further reiterated the dedication of the fans of the show for helping it to its fourth season and continued success. When asked about whether the writers would have enough notice to write the fourth-season finale as a series finale if necessary, Reilly stated, "That's a Peter Roth issue" (chief executive of Warner Bros. Television). To which Roth responded, "We have no plans to give viewers closure this season because we expect the series to continue". In late January 2012, Fox and Warner Bros. Television were working on negotiating a lower licensing cost for the show to allow a fifth season to occur; this would not only help Fox reduce its losses on the show, but would also bring the total number of episodes above 100, giving Warner Bros. a better opportunity to syndicate reruns of the show. Before the announcement of the fifth season, Wyman and Pinkner stated that they would have created a series finale for the end of the fourth season should the show be cancelled; Wyman stated "We want to take care of the fans. We want them to see where it would have gone, but we also know the show has been a commitment and we want everyone to be satisfied with it."

The show was officially renewed for a fifth and final season for the 2012–2013 television season, consisting of a shortened set of 13 episodes, on April 26, 2012, with its premiere on September 28, 2012. Reilly, in announcing the renewal, stated that "Fringe is a remarkably creative series that has set the bar as one of television's most imaginative dramas. Bringing it back for a final 13 allows us to provide the climactic conclusion that its passionate and loyal fans deserve". The writing team crafted an idea for a cohesive story-driven set of thirteen episodes as a means to complete the series, and to "honor the audience that had served us so well was to say a proper farewell", according to Roth. Noble called it "the season for the fans", with the story revisiting many of the elements from the show's past.

=== Awards and nominations ===
Fringe and its cast and crew have been nominated and won several awards including Emmys, Saturn Awards, Golden Reel Awards, Satellite Awards, and Writers Guild of America Awards.

Award	Year	Category	Nominee(s)	Episode	Result
Primetime Emmy Awards	2009	Outstanding Special Visual Effects	Kevin Blank, Jay Worth, Andrew Orloff, Johnathan Banta, Steve Graves, Jonathan Spencer Levy, Scott Dewis, Steve Fong, Tom Turnball	"Pilot"	Nominated
Primetime Emmy Awards	2010	Outstanding Sound Editing in a Series	Paul Curtis, Rick Norman, Bruce Tanis, Paul Apelgren, Shelley Roden, Rick Partlow	"White Tulip"	Nominated
Golden Reel Awards	2009	Best Sound Editing – Long Form Dialogue and ADR in Television	Bruce Honda, Bob Redpath, Chris Reeves, David M. Cowman, Mitchell C. Gettleman, Tom A. Harris, Virginia Cook McGowan	"Pilot"	Nominated
Golden Reel Awards	2009	Best Sound Editing – Short Form Dialogue and ADR in Television	Tom A. Harris, Christopher Reeves, Gabrielle Reeves, Jay Keiser	"Safe"	Nominated
Golden Reel Awards	2009	Best Sound Editing – Long Form Sound Effects and Foley in Television	Walter Newman, Bob Redpath, Micheal Ferdie, Kenneth Young, Adam Johnston, David Werntz, Ron Salaises, Casey Crabtree, Michael Crabtree	"Pilot"	Nominated
Golden Reel Awards	2010	Best Sound Editing – Short Form Sound Effects and Foley in Television	Thomas A. Harris, Michael Ferdie, Nick Neutra, Robert Kellough, Joe Schultz, Sanaa Cannella, Cynthia Merrill	"Unleashed"	Nominated
Golden Reel Awards	2010	Best Sound Editing – Short Form Music in Television	Paul Apelgren	"Night of Desirable Objects"	Nominated
Golden Reel Awards	2011	Best Sound Editing – Short Form Music in Television	Paul Apelgren	"The Box"	Nominated
Golden Reel Awards	2011	Best Sound Editing – Short Form Musical In Television	Paul Apelgren	"Brown Betty"	Nominated
Satellite Awards	2008	Best Supporting Actor – Series, Miniseries, or Television Film	John Noble		Nominated
Satellite Awards	2009	Best Supporting Actor – Series, Miniseries, or Television Film	John Noble		Nominated
Saturn Awards	2008	Best Network Television Series	Fringe		Nominated
Saturn Awards	2008	Best Actress on Television	Anna Torv		Nominated
Saturn Awards	2009	Best Network Television Series	Fringe		Nominated
Saturn Awards	2009	Best Actress on Television	Anna Torv		Won
Saturn Awards	2009	Best Supporting Actor on Television	John Noble		Nominated
Saturn Awards	2009	Best Guest Star on Television	Leonard Nimoy		Won
Saturn Awards	2010	Best Network Television Series	Fringe		Won
Saturn Awards	2010	Best Actress on Television	Anna Torv		Won
Saturn Awards	2010	Best Supporting Actor on Television	John Noble		Won
Saturn Awards	2010	Best Supporting Actor on Television	Lance Reddick		Nominated
Saturn Awards	2010	Best Guest Star on Television	Seth Gabel		Nominated
Saturn Awards	2011	Best Network Television Series	Fringe		Won
Saturn Awards	2011	Best Actress on Television	Anna Torv		Won
Saturn Awards	2011	Best Supporting Actor on Television	John Noble		Nominated
Saturn Awards	2011	Best Guest Star on Television	Orla Brady		Nominated
Saturn Awards	2012	Best Network Television Series	Fringe		Nominated
Saturn Awards	2012	Best Actress on Television	Anna Torv		Won
Saturn Awards	2012	Best Actor on Television	Joshua Jackson		Nominated
Saturn Awards	2012	Best Supporting Actor on Television	John Noble		Nominated
Saturn Awards	2012	Best Guest Star on Television	Lance Reddick		Nominated
Saturn Awards	2012	Best Guest Star on Television	Blair Bown		Nominated
Writers Guild of America Awards	2009	Long Form – Original	J. J. Abrams, Alex Kurtzman, Roberto Orci	"Pilot"	Nominated

== Distribution ==
=== International ===
Fringe premiered in Canada on CTV simultaneous to its U.S. premiere and was the most watched program in Canada that week. The show would fluctuate between airing on CTV and A during its first two seasons. Beginning with the third season, Fringe was broadcast on City in Canada.

A version of the show (edited for time) premiered on the Nine Network in Australia on September 17, 2008. In the season one episode "In Which We Meet Mr. Jones", the opening scene where doctors discover a parasite on Detective Loeb's heart was cut, going straight to the opening credits. Nine Network later dropped the show from its primetime schedule. This was temporary as the show returned during the December to January non-ratings period. The series later moved to Nine's digital multi-channel GO! where the last few seasons were played out.

The series premiered in the United Kingdom on Sky1 on October 5, 2008.

=== Syndication ===
With 13 episodes in its final season, Fringe has a total of 100 episodes, a critical number for syndication deals for Warner Bros., and considered part of the reason for the show's final renewal. The show premiered in syndication on the Science Network on November 20, 2012.

=== Home video releases ===
The first season of Fringe was released on DVD and Blu-ray Disc on September 8, 2009, in region 1. In addition to all the episodes that had been aired, extras include three commentary tracks, unaired scenes, gag reels and behind the scenes features. A "Fringe Pattern Analysis" feature is included on the Blu-ray version as an exclusive. The sets were released on September 28, 2009, in region 2 and on September 30, 2009, in region 4.

The second season features four commentary tracks, a gag reel, deleted scenes, behind the scenes videos, and the episode "Unearthed", an episode, produced for the first season, which aired out of schedule during the second season. It was released on DVD and Blu-ray on September 14, 2010, in region 1, on September 27, 2010, in region 2, and on November 10, 2010, in region 4.

The third season features two commentary tracks, a gag reel, behind the scenes videos, and two features exclusive to the Blu-ray version. It was released on DVD and Blu-ray on September 6, 2011, in region 1, on September 26, 2011, in region 2, and on October 26, 2011, in region 4.

The fourth season includes several special features, including "The Culture of Fringe", a roundtable discussion with series writers and university professors regarding the science featured in the series; features on how the disappearance of Peter affects the timeline, and the role of the Observers; two features covering the Fringe comic series; and a gag reel. It was released on DVD and Blu-ray on September 4, 2011, in region 1, on September 24, 2012, in region 2, and on October 31, 2012, in region 4.

The fifth season includes featurettes titled "A Farewell to Fringe" and "Fringe Panel at Comic-Con 2012", as well audio commentaries and a gag reel. It was released on Blu-ray and DVD on May 7, 2013, in region 1 and on May 13, 2013, in region 2. A complete series box set was also released on the same dates of the fifth season release in the respective regions.

== Other media ==
=== Games ===
An alternate reality game, centered on the fictional Massive Dynamic corporation, was introduced during the pilot and featured "strange symbols paired with glowing dots" appearing throughout the episode and an "advertisement" for the company shown at the end with a web address for the game.

=== Books and comics ===
On August 27, 2008, a prequel comic book (leading right up to the moment in the pilot where Olivia 'first' meets Walter) written by Zack Whedon was released by DC Comics under its WildStorm imprint. This was to be the first issue of a monthly 6-issue limited series but the others were delayed until January 2009, when monthly publication resumed, with the sixth and final issue scheduled for release on June 17. The Vice President of WildStorm, Hank Kanalz, explained the publication hiatus: "The writers of the show want to make sure the comic book is integrated into the mythology of the Fringe world, so we have decided to refocus the direction of the comic book. Unfortunately, this means that we will have some delays, but will be back in January."

On June 23, 2010, the first issue of Tales From the Fringe, the second six-part monthly series, was released, while the final issue was released on November 24, 2010.

Additionally, in September 2011, DC released the first issue of Beyond the Fringe comic series. With the first story written by Joshua Jackson titled "Peter and the Machine". Jhonen Vasquez, Becky Cloonan, Cole Fowler, Jorge Jimenez, Kristen Cantrell, Ben Templesmith, Tom Mandrake, and Carrie Strachen are among the other creators on the series. The comic issues will alternate with an 'A' story and a 'B' story each. For example, "Peter and the Machine" will take place in issues one, three, and so on until the story is finished and a new 'A' story starts up.

An encyclopedia guide, September's Notebook — The Bishop Paradox, written by Tara Bennett and Paul Terry who had previously written the Lost Encyclopedia for Lost, was released in March 2013. A three-part series of prequel novels written by Christa Faust was released throughout 2013 and 2014. Each novel deals with a member of the Fringe team's past. The first is titled The Zodiac Paradox and is about Walter and his discovery of Cortexiphan. The second in the series is titled The Burning Man and is based on Olivia and how she was first exposed to Cortexiphan. The third is titled Sins of the Father and is about Peter's life in 2008 just before the point of time when the series starts.

=== Possible film ===
At the 2012 San Diego Comic-Con, actor John Noble speculated that a film could be made further down the line.

== Notes ==
1. Despite Michael Giacchino's name still credited in the TV series, he did not compose music from Season 2 onwards.
2. Fauxlivia: Faux, French for false
