= Over There (Fringe) =

- Fringe episodes
- FBI agent Olivia (left) confronts Fauxlivia (right), her doppelgänger from the parallel universe
- Episode nos.: Season 2 Episodes 22 and 23
- Directed by: Akiva Goldsman
- Written by: Jeff Pinkner; J. H. Wyman; Akiva Goldsman
- Production codes: 3X5121; 3X5122
- Original air dates: May 13, 2010 (Part 1); May 20, 2010 (Part 2)

Guest appearances
- Kirk Acevedo as Charlie Francis; Leonard Nimoy as William Bell; Orla Brady as Elizabeth Bishop; David Call as Nick Lane; Seth Gabel as Lincoln Lee; Ari Graynor as Rachel Dunham; Pascale Hutton as Sally Clark; Omar Metwally as James Heath; Ryan McDonald as Brandon; Lily Pilblad as Ella Blake; Philip Winchester as Frank Stanton; Stefan Arngrim as the Store Owner; Michael Cerveris as the Observer

Episode chronology
← Previous "Northwest Passage"	Next → "Olivia"
- Fringe season 2

"Over There" is the two-part second season finale of the Fox science fiction drama series Fringe. They are the 21st and 22nd episodes of the season, and the 42nd and 43rd episodes of the series overall. Both parts were written by Academy Award-winning screenwriter Akiva Goldsman, together with showrunners Jeff Pinkner and J. H. Wyman. Goldsman also served as director, his first such credit since the season premiere.

Fringe's premise is based on the idea of two parallel universes, our own and the Other Side, each of which contains historical idiosyncrasies. The two universes began to clash in 1985, after Dr. Walter Bishop (John Noble) stole the parallel universe version of his son, Peter, following his own son's death. The finale's narrative recounts what happens when Peter (Joshua Jackson) is taken back to the Other Side by his real father, dubbed "Walternate" (Noble). FBI agent Olivia Dunham (Anna Torv) and Walter lead a team of former Cortexiphan test subjects to retrieve him, after discovering that Peter is an unwitting part of Walternate's plans to bring about the destruction of our universe using an ancient doomsday device.

In the finale, the main characters spend the longest amount of time in the parallel universe to date. The writers sought to emphasize the differences between the two worlds: Anna Torv created a unique personality and physical demeanor for her character's doppelgänger, Fauxlivia; DC Comics designed special covers based upon some of their classic editions to display in the Other Side. These and other popular culture differences were noted and appreciated by critics, persuading the writers to add more in the third season. The episodes mark the first appearance of recurring character Lincoln Lee (Seth Gabel), as well as the return of actors Leonard Nimoy and Kirk Acevedo as William Bell and Agent Charlie Francis, respectively.

Although originally intended to air on the same night, the two parts were broadcast in the United States a week apart. On its initial airing on May 13, 2010, an estimated 5.99 million viewers watched part one. Part two aired on May 20, and was viewed by an estimated audience of 5.68 million. Both episodes received overwhelmingly positive reviews, and the season was chosen for a significant number of "best of" lists by various media outlets; many critics praised the second episode's cliffhanger in particular. The finale was included in most of the categories at Entertainment Weekly's voter-driven TV Season Finale Awards, placing first in two. Pinkner, Wyman, and Goldsman submitted both episodes for the drama writing and directing categories for the 62nd Primetime Emmy Awards, and Nimoy submitted his work from the second episode for consideration in the Outstanding Guest Actor in a Drama Series category; none received a nomination.

== Plot ==
=== Part one ===
Dr. Walter Bishop (John Noble) and FBI agent Olivia Dunham (Anna Torv) discover that Peter Bishop (Joshua Jackson) has agreed to return with his real father, dubbed "Walternate" (Noble), to his own universe called the Other Side, which runs parallel to ours. One of the mysterious Observers (Michael Cerveris) leaves Olivia a note indicating that Peter is named in a prophecy as the one responsible for the end of the world. To warn Peter of his impending role, the Fringe Division work with biotechnology corporation Massive Dynamic to come up with a way to cross over. They form a plan that takes advantage of Olivia's universe-hopping ability, and recruit three other Cortexiphan test subjects who have unique abilities: Nick Lane (David Call), Sally Clark (Pascale Hutton), and James Heath (Omar Metwally), two of whom appeared in previous episodes. (Note: See: Nick Lane's introduction took place in the season one episode "Bad Dreams"; James Heath's introduction took place in the season two episode "Olivia. In the Lab. With the Revolver."; Sally Clark's introduction took place in the finale.) The team—composed of Walter, Olivia, Nick, Sally, and James—successfully arrives on the Other Side. James dies shortly after arrival, but the rest manage to escape the alternate reality's Fringe Division, who had used their special technology to detect their arrival. It is revealed that Walternate is the Secretary of Defense on the Other Side.

Peter reunites with his real mother, Elizabeth (Orla Brady), while Walter's team journeys to meet with William Bell (Leonard Nimoy) at Central Park. But instead of Bell the alternate Fringe Division appears, and attacks Walter's team. Nick is shot and Sally stays with him; she produces a suicidal fireball that torches both her and Nick to ashes and severely burns the Other Side Fringe Division's principal investigator Lincoln Lee (Seth Gabel). Walter is shot and walks to the hospital. Olivia follows her alternate counterpart and encounters Bell, who insists he did not betray their location to the Fringe Division and tells her that Walter is in trouble. Walternate is seen in the room housing the doomsday device Peter will be a part of, and leaves with its final component.

=== Part two ===
Walternate learns of Walter's presence in the hospital and dispatches "Fauxlivia" (Torv) and "Alt-Charlie" (Kirk Acevedo) to apprehend him, but before their arrival Bell and Olivia liberate Walter and escape. Fauxlivia sees a surveillance shot of Olivia and Walter and decides to confer with Walternate about the doppelgängers. During a discussion in his office, Walternate lies to Peter about the doomsday machine's real purpose, claiming it can help to heal both worlds. Fauxlivia meets Peter in Walternate's office and subsequently drives him to his new apartment. Walter and Bell travel to Harvard to collect some equipment necessary for the journey back to their own universe, and Walter reveals his intense dislike for Bell, whom he considers to have been a selfish war profiteer while he himself was locked away for seventeen years. Bell tells Walter that the parallel universe equivalent of himself died in a car accident as a young man. Olivia confronts Fauxlivia, who recognizes that Olivia has feelings for Peter. The women fight, and after rendering Fauxlivia unconscious Olivia dyes her hair to assume Fauxlivia's identity. Meanwhile, Peter discovers that the machine is symbiotic and needs a particular human to control it—him.

Olivia and an oblivious alt-Charlie visit Peter to take him to a safe location. Olivia knocks out alt-Charlie and reveals herself to Peter, informing him of the machine's real purpose and Walternate's intentions. Peter tells her that he does not belong in either reality, following which Olivia admits her romantic feelings for him and convinces him to leave with her. The couple race to meet Walter and Bell at the Opera House, where Fauxlivia and a team of Fringe Commandos catch up with them. Bell and Olivia hold off the assault while Peter and Walter set up the dimensional device to enable their return home. Lacking a fuel source for the device, Bell sacrifices himself to create a nuclear reaction, using his body's unstable molecular state. Close to death, Bell reveals that he removed Walter's memories at his own request, and he and Walter are reconciled. Olivia, Walter, and Peter return home. Peter tells Walter he will never understand him, but because Walter traveled to another universe twice to save him—which has "gotta count for something"—he forgives him. Olivia is revealed to be Fauxlivia, infiltrating Our Side, when she arrives at a typewriter communication station to await orders. The Olivia from our world is then seen in a military detention center on the Other Side. Walternate visits and stares at Olivia without speaking before leaving her in the dark, in solitary confinement.

== Production ==
=== Writing and filming ===
"Over There" was written by Academy Award-winning screenwriter and frequent Fringe collaborator Akiva Goldsman, together with showrunners Jeff Pinkner and J. H. Wyman. Goldsman directed the episodes, his first such credit since the season premiere. He explained the finale in a January 2010 interview with Entertainment Weekly: "We're trying to do the last two episodes as a singular event, a little bit more movie-like. It's really one big story. We're approaching it like a mini-feature. It'll have a singular narrative drive." They originally intended for the two parts to air on the same night, but Fox told them it would be shown on two nights, a week apart. The episodes first aired in the United States on May 13 and May 20, 2010. The writers, finding the script to be easily divisible, ended the first episode with William Bell and Olivia meeting outside Fauxlivia's apartment, and began the second with Bell helping Walter escape from the hospital.

Pinkner and Wyman brought back the "Cortexiphan kids", introduced in the first two seasons, because they felt that part of the storyline was really interesting. They wanted the end of the season to be a "beautiful culmination of everything" while traveling to the Other Side. The show had been developing a parallel universe storyline since its conception, but "Over There" marked the longest time spent in that world thus far. Pinker explained the idea of two worlds: "One of the big themes of the show is how small choices that you make define you as a person and can change your life in large ways down the line." Wyman said that the parallel universe "is a reminder to our viewers that your life is what your choices are." The two began discussing details about the Other Side early on, especially what the differences between the two universes would be. Pinkner commented in an interview with the Los Angeles Times that "a lot of them are ideas that we jokingly threw out. Some of them, like the notion of zeppelins or the Statue of Liberty if we didn't let it oxidize or the Grand Central Hotel, we're not making up. Had the Hindenburg not blown up, zeppelins would be passenger air ships docking at the Empire State Building. That was the plan. We opened ourselves to the standard that it had to be possible." Pinkner later elaborated, "We're interested in world building and all that stuff is the texture that actually makes it a world. The richness of detail is what makes it feel real." They used comic books as one way to subtly differentiate the two worlds. Goldsman, Wyman, and actor Joshua Jackson are longstanding comic book fans and decided to make the character of Peter a fan as well. Goldsman called on his friend Geoff Johns, Chief Creative Officer at DC Comics. He arranged for DC to specially design ten alternate covers for some of their most iconic editions, which were displayed in Peter's apartment on the Other Side. Visual effects company Eden FX created Peter's apartment and the alternate New York skyline visible outside his window. When fans reacted positively to these detailed characteristics written into the parallel universe, the producers stated their intention to show a lot more similar details in the third season.

"The alternate Fringe team ... consists of an exact duplicate of Olivia, but somebody who didn't grow up with the same burdens as our Olivia, and therefore, has a different approach and attitude towards life."

— Jeff Pinkner describing Fauxlivia

The finale introduces parallel-universe versions of familiar characters, including the Fauxlivia version of Olivia Dunham, both played by actress Anna Torv. One topic of conversation among fans, journalists, and those working on the show was what to call the alternate Olivia to differentiate the two. Names varied, with many using "Fauxlivia", "Bolivia", and/or "Altlivia". The writers chose Fauxlivia because a character in a season three episode referred to her as such. Torv and Akiva Goldsman discussed various ways to differentiate the two depictions of Olivia; ultimately two different physical demeanors were created. Torv wanted to make the new character "completely different", but she and Goldsman recognized that the two share some major similarities, as they both are in the same profession and are "fundamentally, genetically really the same person." According to Torv, Fauxlivia holds herself differently and has "a different silhouette. She's got a little firefighter, a little military in her." Torv further explained, "Olivia wants to be the best, but [Fauxlivia] just wants to win;" "There's just a front-footedness I think to [her], simply because she just doesn't carry the weight of the world on her shoulders like Olivia does. Olivia's mum died when she was really little, and [Fauxlivia]'s mum is still around. There's lots of little, subtle differences." The producers discussed cutting her hair, but ultimately decided on the auburn hair color to differentiate her. They also made her "a little bit more playful". Pinkner describes shooting the Fauxlivia scenes in the DVD audio commentary: "When [Torv] first showed up on set in this different guise, she had really embodied this other character in a very playful and sexy way. She turned a lot of heads." Goldsman remarked that Torv's depiction of Fauxlivia was actually much closer to the actress' real personality than her performance as Olivia. The producers were so pleased with her Fauxlivia depiction that they thought "it really opened up a bunch of possibilities ... it went from 'let's see if this experiment works' to 'how can we get more of this?'"

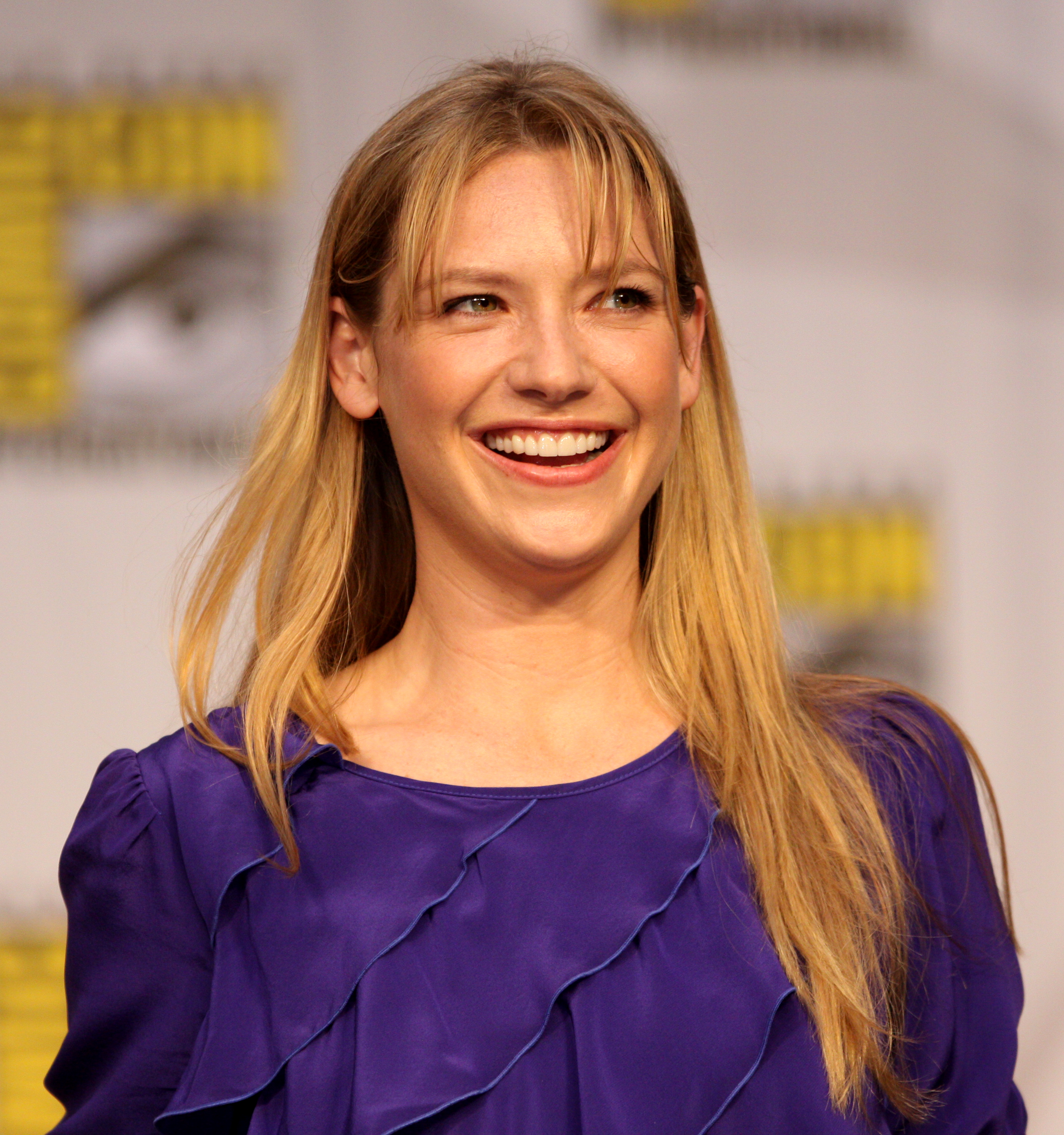

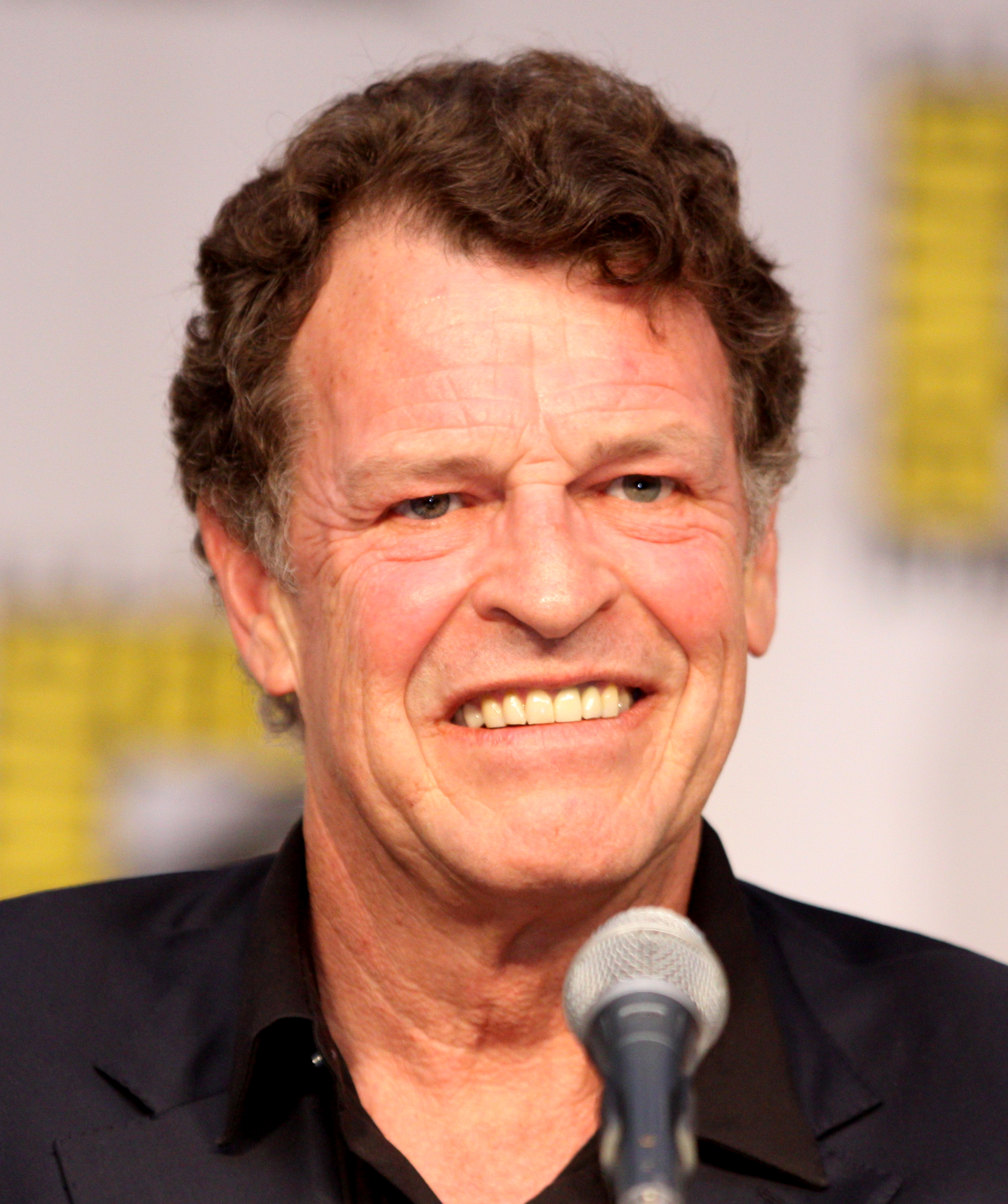
By the end of the second season, actors Anna Torv (above) and John Noble (below) had played two versions of their respective characters.

"Over There" marks the first time Olivia meets Fauxlivia. Their meeting was one of the first scenes to be shot; this caused Anna Torv to be anxious about her new character's traits "coming across", as she had not yet developed all her mannerisms for Fauxlivia. While filming the conversation between the two, they did not use a double; Torv memorized the timing and where she should be looking and pointing her gun, and the characters were filmed one at a time. Torv commented about the scene, "You're talking to air. Learning both sides ... was tough." For the fight scene that followed, Torv had to block and aim her gun carefully while being mindful of her movements and the camera's location—though she was aided by stunt doubles. Torv credits the crew for successfully completing the scene: "I give them all the credit in the world. It took a while. They had to change the makeup, change the clothes, change the hair, change every little thing, every time they [moved] the camera."

A later scene depicts Walter in a hospital recovering from a gunshot wound. Olivia and William Bell try to smuggle him out. As it was a real emergency room in a Vancouver hospital, the crew had only one day of shooting. One of the scenes included "monitor acting", in which Torv had to react to a blank computer screen, because the writers had not yet chosen what images they wanted to display. The scene between Olivia, Walter, and Bell was originally set in a coffee shop, but the producers changed their minds when they realized they needed more funding for the finale. Consequently, they began "hawking" the scene in the hopes of gaining a sponsor. KFC responded, agreeing to pay them for shooting the scene at one of their locations. Walternate's office scenes were shot in a mortuary overlooking a cemetery. Goldsman had Joshua Jackson react in different ways during his first meeting with Fauxlivia, including showing "anger and testiness". He ultimately decided he would be "quite taken with her". For the second episode's cliffhanger, the producers worried about making it as "provocative" as the first season's. They were originally going to have Olivia sacrifice herself to allow Peter and Walter's return to Our Side, but changed their minds when Wyman suggested she be secretly swapped with Fauxlivia instead. Wyman commented, "We were ecstatic when we figured [the cliffhanger] out." Co-creator J. J. Abrams and other cast members were also pleased with it, with Abrams calling it "different, but I think equally impactful." They wrote the cliffhanger before they knew whether the series had been renewed—they would have had to make an "eleventh-hour redraft" had the show been canceled by Fox.

=== Casting ===
On April 5, 2010, Entertainment Weekly reported that Dirty Sexy Money actor Seth Gabel had been cast as the lead Fringe investigator in the parallel universe, and would be making his first appearance in the finale as a possible recurring character. Jeff Pinkner described the character as "the scientist-cop-leader of the team on the Other Side." In an interview with TV Guide, Gabel commented that during shooting he felt that he looked "like such a doofus holding a gun," but changed his mind when he saw the finished production. Gabel elaborated, "I was so scared that I wouldn't pull it off. Once I saw myself being a scientist-slash-FBI hero, I felt more confident and relaxed." His character is caught in a large explosion in the finale, but Gabel confirmed, in a Chicago Tribune interview, that his character would be returning for the third season. He states that the parallel universe has "special technology than can heal burns".

The finale marked the return of actor Kirk Acevedo as the Other Side FBI agent Charlie Francis. In the DVD audio commentary, the producers admit they "faced a bit of hatred" when they killed off Acevedo's character near the beginning of the season. They were aware the entire time that Charlie exists in the parallel universe, and that "nobody ever dies on Fringe". Acevedo describes the parallel universe version of his character as someone who is "so much more fun." He is subtly different, with a lighter personality; he jokes around more, and is less "doom and gloom" than the original character. Some viewers refer to the new character as "alt-Charlie" to differentiate the two. The actor, the producers, and some fans have called the new character "Scarlie" in reference to a scar on his cheek, which takes ten minutes to apply before shooting, according to Acevedo. Previous guest actors Orla Brady, Lily Pilblad, Ari Graynor, Omar Metwally, Ryan McDonald, and David Call appear in the finale, as well as new guest stars Philip Winchester and Pascale Hutton.

"Because what Walternate is, is a very human character, who's had his son stolen. That would be enough to drive anyone to distraction. He has become, because of his strength and intelligence, the natural leader of this disintegrating world. And so he behaves in a certain way. He's also fueled by revenge and anger. These are all human things. You start to put them in a certain place and you get Walternate."

— John Noble describing his new character "Walternate"

Some cast members portray alternate versions of their characters, including John Noble, Lance Reddick, and Jasika Nicole. Noble described his doppelgänger—nicknamed "Walternate" by Walter—as "[physically] the same man and the same actor." He continued, "I think of [Walternate] as a soldier. He's like a general in the army. He's very upright, he's very strong." Reddick called alt-Broyles "a great patriot and a great mind," but "a bit of a maverick, so I guess we'll see just how that loyalty and relationship plays out." Nicole based "alterna-Astrid"'s characteristics on her sister, who has Asperger syndrome, partly by avoiding eye contact with the other characters when relaying information to them and by focusing solely on the data in front of her.

Though guest actor Leonard Nimoy was reluctant to return after completing his three-episode commitment on the show that had ended with the season's tenth episode, he returned for the season finale when the producers "essentially called him up and pleaded". They discussed their plans for the character, and "told him it was a story we couldn't tell without him." He "graciously agreed." "Over There" marked Nimoy's longest appearance on Fringe, a longer and "much more involv[ed]" shoot of roughly seven days was required. Despite Leonard Nimoy's planned exit from the show, the show's producers have said that nothing is final in the Fringe world. Pinkner commented that Nimoy's retirement from acting obviously hinders his character's possible return but, "if Leonard chooses to come back, there is a story in place that we'd love to tell." Wyman elaborated that "I think it's fair to say that you have not experienced the last of William Bell". When the producers told Nimoy their ideas for Bell's storyline in the third season, he returned for some brief voice and animation work in the episode "Lysergic Acid Diethylamide".

== Cultural references ==
A number of popular culture references are used to subtly differentiate the two universes. The American drama series The West Wing is beginning its 11th season in the parallel universe, and US politicians Barack Obama and Sarah Palin are in one of the show's advertisements. The parallel universe's Statue of Liberty is still its original shiny copper. "We imagined that Over There, they really liked copper and they cleaned it all the time," one of the creators says. Liberty Island is the location of Fringe Division and the Department of Defense on the Other Side. The Hotel Attraction project by Spanish architect Antoni Gaudí was built in 1908 in the parallel universe, whereas in our world it never went past initial planning. Former president Richard Nixon is shown on a dollar coin in the parallel universe, rather than Dwight Eisenhower. Fauxlivia finds a twenty-dollar bill from Our Side and questions who Andrew Jackson is, implying that he was either never president or is far less known in their universe. Civil rights activist Martin Luther King Jr. is shown on their version of the bill, which has been nicknamed a "junior".

Aviator Charles Lindbergh is less well known in the parallel universe, and the famous kidnapping of his son presumably did not occur, as Fauxlivia expresses confusion when his name is brought up. When Walter, Bell, and Olivia are on the Other Side eating at KFC (called KGC in the alternate universe, for Kentucky Grilled Chicken), Walter puts on a Brooklyn Dodgers baseball cap. Unlike in Our Side, the team never moved to Los Angeles. The parallel universe has a number of famous comic book issues from DC Comics, similar to Our Side, but with notable differences. For instance, the Red Arrow and Red Lantern exist on the Other Side, rather than the green versions of both characters in our universe, and there are different members in the Justice League. Fauxlivia's cellphone ringtone is taken from the 1975 film The Rocky Horror Picture Show. Other films, both real and invented, are also shown in the parallel universe, such as Superman vs. Batman 2, Indiana Jones and the Hex of the Hydra, Star Wars: Legion of Droids, Splash 7, Smokey and the Bandit: The Final Lap and Mask vs. Joker.

== Reception ==
=== Broadcast and ratings ===
Fox renewed Fringe for a third season in early March 2010. The episodes aired on May 13 and May 20, 2010, in the United States and Canada. On May 17 Fox announced that the show would remain in its Thursday timeslot for the new season. A deleted scene cut from the finale featured Walternate and Peter discussing the fictional band "Violet Sedan Chair" while driving a Ford Taurus; the scene's reference to a "Ford exclusive", as well as the perceived "loving shots" of the car, caused it to be noted as a prime example of product placement by some critics. The scene was advertised during the second episode's commercial breaks in the US, advising viewers to view the clip at Fox's official website. As with other Fringe episodes, Fox released two science lesson plans for grade school children focusing on the science seen in both parts of "Over There"; the first part's intention was to have "students learn about how the various forms of energy can be converted into other forms of energy and how these conversions can be used to either disperse or concentrate energy." The second part's purpose was for "students [to] learn about how various types of sensors can be used to remotely collect information about a geographical area, which allows for unique scientific analyses and discoveries."

According to the Nielsen ratings system, upon its original US broadcast, part one garnered an estimated 5.99 million viewers and a 3.6/6 ratings share among all households. It received a 2.3/7 ratings share among adults 18–49. In keeping with the rest of its second season, Fringe's ratings suffered due to tough competition from episodes of CBS's CSI: Crime Scene Investigation and ABC's Grey's Anatomy, as these programs were also broadcast in the same time slot. Fringe and its lead-in, Bones, helped Fox place third for the night, behind CBS and ABC. The second part was viewed by an estimated 5.68 million viewers, with a 2.0 ratings share among adults 18–49. This was a 13 percent fall in the 18–49 ratings share from the previous week, as the second episode faced competition from the season finale of CSI: Crime Scene Investigation and the two-part season finale of Grey's Anatomy. "Over There's" second part helped Fox place third for total viewers that night, behind CBS and ABC, and tie with NBC for third place among viewers 18–49.

The finale aired on two separate nights in the United Kingdom. The first part was scheduled to air on May 25, 2010, on the UK's Sky1, but was put back a week to make room for the series finale of Lost. The first part aired on June 1 in the UK, with an estimated 195,000 viewers tuning in. The second part aired on June 8 to an estimated 246,000 viewers.

=== Reviews ===
"This first installment of Fringe's two-part season finale was fantastic. The opening shots revealed our old friend Charlie Francis, the closing shots featured Walternate and his mysterious new machine, and everything in-between made this a great story that leads us into one hell of a conclusion to the season."

— Ramsey Isler, in his review of the first episode for IGN

The first part of the finale received critical acclaim. Ramsey Isler of IGN thought it "fantastic," because it was "a great story that leads us into one hell of a conclusion to the season," and that it "right away [gave] us the deepest, most exciting look into the alternate universe we've seen so far." He rated it 9.0/10. Ken Tucker from Entertainment Weekly and MTV's Josh Wigler agreed on this last point, with Tucker noting the first part "was a complete success and a blast at giving us a fully lived-in alternate universe." Noel Murray of The A.V. Club graded the first part with an A−, calling it "a fun, exciting episode that nicely set up next week's finale". Isler, Wigler, and Murray loved the return of the Cortexifan subjects; Murray docked the episode a half point, explaining "I love the idea of Olivia & The Cortexifanatics so much that I'm bummed Fringe burned through the group so quickly." Critic Andrew Hanson, writing for the Los Angeles Times, noted that because of the parallel universe focus, the first part felt like the following season's premiere. He praised the opening scene, and believed the scenes between Peter and his mother helped "ground the episode. They might be out of pace with the action and drama pouring out of every other moment, but there was weight and emotion. Bravo Joshua Jackson and Orla Brady. Bravo." Ken Tucker noted that the scenes with Peter and his true mother indicated "a great, humantistic use of a sci-fi trope". MTV's Josh Wigler praised Torv's performance, but wished the two-part finale was not broken up, explaining "I could have easily tuned in for another several hours. Heck, I could watch an entire parallel series focused solely on the alternate universe!"

"I know that [...] Fringe is sci-fi with the emphasis on science, but I'm in it for its imagery and metaphor, its literary and cultural-studies provocations. The fact that the series can accommodate a fan like me only confirms what a well-wrought piece of pop culture Fringe has become."

— Entertainment Weekly writer Ken Tucker in his review of the second episode

Like part one, the second part premiered to critical acclaim. Isler wrote that it "changed the whole landscape of the show's main plot arc. Although there were some rough spots in the execution of this story, overall it's one hell of a way to end the season." He rated the episode 8.6/10. While praising Noble's performance, Isler criticized some plot aspects. He was "kind of torn" on the Peter-Olivia kiss, wished Peter and the doomsday device had been set up more for the third season, and believed the Olivia-Fauxlivia interaction to be "a little strange," as the two went from discussing their respective families to "ass kicking". Isler did praise the fight itself. Ken Tucker praised the acting and the writers, noting "The fact that the series can accommodate a fan like me only confirms what a well-wrought piece of pop culture Fringe has become." Tucker included the second part of the season in his mid-year "Top 10" list for 2010, partly attributing this ranking to Fringe "offer[ing] the season's best cliffhanger", alongside Breaking Bad. Noel Murray declared that he enjoyed part two slightly more, grading it an A. He praised Torv and Noble's performances for "inhabiting their respective worlds so well", and Goldsman for "[shooting] this episode with an emphasis on the characters more than the setting".

Hanson felt the second part fulfilled all of the criteria for an incredible season finale: the season's arc had a "pay-off" he "didn't see coming" in the aftermath of Walternate crossing universes to take back Peter; the entire episode was an "event" because it spent more time in the parallel universe than ever before, and it had an "A+ cliffhanger". MTV's Fringe reviewer Josh Wigler enjoyed the ending, calling it "one heck of a cliffhanger!" James Poniewozik from Time Magazine positively compared both parts of the finale to The X-Files, writing that, unlike that series, Fringe's standalone episodes contribute to the overall mythology of the show. To him the finale "demonstrates how well the show now manages to balance its far-fetched sci-fi with grounded character storylines." Poniewozik concluded his review by expressing that it was not as strong as "Peter", but "'Over There' was a season-ender that did what it should—left me wanting more".

"This is a very exciting way to leave things, both in terms of story possibilities and in terms of what it has to say about our characters and their broken lives."

— Noel Murray on the cliffhanger in his review of the second episode for The A.V. Club

Many critics praised the many subtle differences between the two universes, while others lauded Leonard Nimoy's appearance as William Bell and his scenes with Walter. Website blogger io9 listed both parts of "Over There" as one of the select few "crucial" episodes new viewers must watch to understand the show, referring to it as "one of the most epic season finales ever". Another io9 reviewer called the ending one of the "best SF/fantasy cliffhangers ever shown on television" in a September 2010 list. The finale helped propel Fringe onto a number of 2010 "best of television" lists, including Digital Spy, Entertainment Weekly, the Seattle Post-Intelligencer, The Daily Beast, The New York Times, TV Squad, the New York Post, and IGN; the last of these named Fringe the best sci-fi series of 2010, beating fellow nominees Lost, Caprica, and Stargate Universe. Some critics predicted that, because of the increased focus on looking into the alternate universe and advancing its mythology, Fringe's "monster-of-the-week" episodes would become less frequent. This could make it more difficult for casual viewers to follow the show in its third season.

=== Awards and nominations ===
Writers J.H. Wyman, Jeff Pinkner, and Akiva Goldsman submitted both parts of "Over There" for consideration in the Outstanding Writing for a Drama Series category at the 62nd Primetime Emmy Awards, and director Goldsman made a submission of both parts for the Outstanding Directing for a Drama Series category. None of the three secured a nomination. Leonard Nimoy submitted part two for consideration in the Outstanding Guest Actor in a Drama Series category. He and fellow guest actor Peter Weller (who appeared in "White Tulip") were not chosen for nominations. At Entertainment Weekly's June 2010 voter-driven TV Season Finale Awards, Fringe was nominated for multiple awards, and won in several categories. The Olivia-Fauxlivia swap was named the "Best Non-Romantic Cliff-hanger" of the season and placed third for the "Single Most Clever Twist", but it also came in third place for "Single Weakest Twist". The ending scene with Walternate and Olivia was voted the winner of the "Spookiest Image" category. Olivia's kiss with Peter finished in fifth place for the "Best Kiss" category, and her fight with Fauxlivia placed second in the "Best Fight" category. In the "Biggest Regret That I Didn't See the Finale, I Just Read About It" category Fringe won third place.
