= Grey Matters (Fringe) =

- Fringe episode
- After Newton reattaches the three missing parts of Walter's brain, Walter temporarily reverts to his old, arrogant self.
- Episode no.: Season 2 Episode 10
- Directed by: Jeannot Szwarc
- Written by: Ashley Edward Miller; Zack Stentz
- Production code: 3X5110
- Original air date: December 10, 2009

Guest appearances
- Sebastian Roché as Thomas Jerome Newton; Leonard Nimoy as William Bell; Jeff Perry as Joseph Slater; Jeanetta Arnette as Dr. Susan West; Roger Cross as Smith

Episode chronology
| ← Previous "Snakehead" | Next → "Unearthed" |
- Fringe season 2

"Grey Matters" is the 10th episode of the second season of the American science fiction drama television series Fringe. The episode was written by Ashley Edward Miller and Zack Stentz, and directed by Jeannot Szwarc. It centered on three mental patients who mysteriously became sane again after shapeshifters from the parallel universe removed a piece of foreign tissue from each of their brains; this tissue is later revealed to have been taken from the brain of Walter Bishop years before. The fringe team of Olivia Dunham, Peter Bishop, and Walter investigate and face a new enemy, Thomas Jerome Newton (guest actor Sebastian Roché), whose purpose is to decipher the missing parts of Walter's brain and find out how to move between universes.

The episode features the first scene between Walter and his old colleague William Bell (played by guest actor Leonard Nimoy). At the time, it fulfilled Nimoy's commitment to the show, though he later returned for the season finale. "Grey Matters" first aired in the United States on December 10, 2009 on Fox to mostly positive reviews. An estimated 6.33 million viewers watched the episode, and it received a 2.3 ratings share among those 18–49.

== Plot ==
In a Boston mental institution, Thomas Jerome Newton (Sebastian Roché) performs brain surgery on a patient, Mr Slater, who keeps repeating "Heather" "flowers in her hair", and a "girl in a red dress". Newton successfully removes part of his brain, but he and his team are forced to leave before they can seal the man's head back up. The Fringe team of Olivia (Anna Torv), Peter (Joshua Jackson), and Walter (John Noble) arrive at the institution and learn that Slater's paranoid schizophrenia was apparently cured by the operation, and that his brain is still structurally intact.

While viewing security footage, Olivia recognizes Newton, the leader of the shapeshifters who was reanimated from a cryogenically frozen head at the end of "Momentum Deferred". Astrid and Walter research the patient's physician, Dr. Paris, and learn he set up an indefinite prescription fourteen years ago for Slater as well as two other patients in the same week. Peter and Olivia interview one of these other patients, who constantly thought about the number 28, but was recently cured of her obsessive compulsive disorder by Newton. She tells them she was originally sent to the hospital by Dr Paris for mild postpartum depression, and that her obsessive compulsive disorder started soon after. Peter and Olivia also hear of a third patient who was mysteriously cured two days ago. Walter realizes that all the patients were given constant doses of organ transplant medication, and that foreign brain tissue was stored in each of their brains.

Walter undergoes a MRI scan, and the team learn Walter had three pieces of his brain tissue removed from his hippocampus, the primary repository for long-term memory. The pieces were then apparently stored inside the brains of the cured patients fourteen years ago. Knowing only Walter could comprehend the memories concerning how to open a portal to another reality, the shapeshifters kidnap him. By the time the others find Walter, Newton has already learned what he needs to know and escapes. Olivia manages to stop them, but is forced to choose between seizing Newton and saving Walter, as he has been given a lethal dose of a neurotoxin that will kill him unless Newton gives them the correct directions. Olivia chooses to save Walter's life, and Newton replies "Now I know how weak you are".

Broyles eases Olivia's concerns that she made an emotional choice by assuring her that her decision to save Walter was a logical one as Walter is highly valuable to the team.

As Walter undergoes a follow-up MRI, he flashes back to a past surgery, where he is being operated on by Dr. Paris (revealed to be William Bell, played by Leonard Nimoy), who removed Walter's brain fragments and hid them in the patients' brains to prevent anyone else from gaining the information.

== Production ==
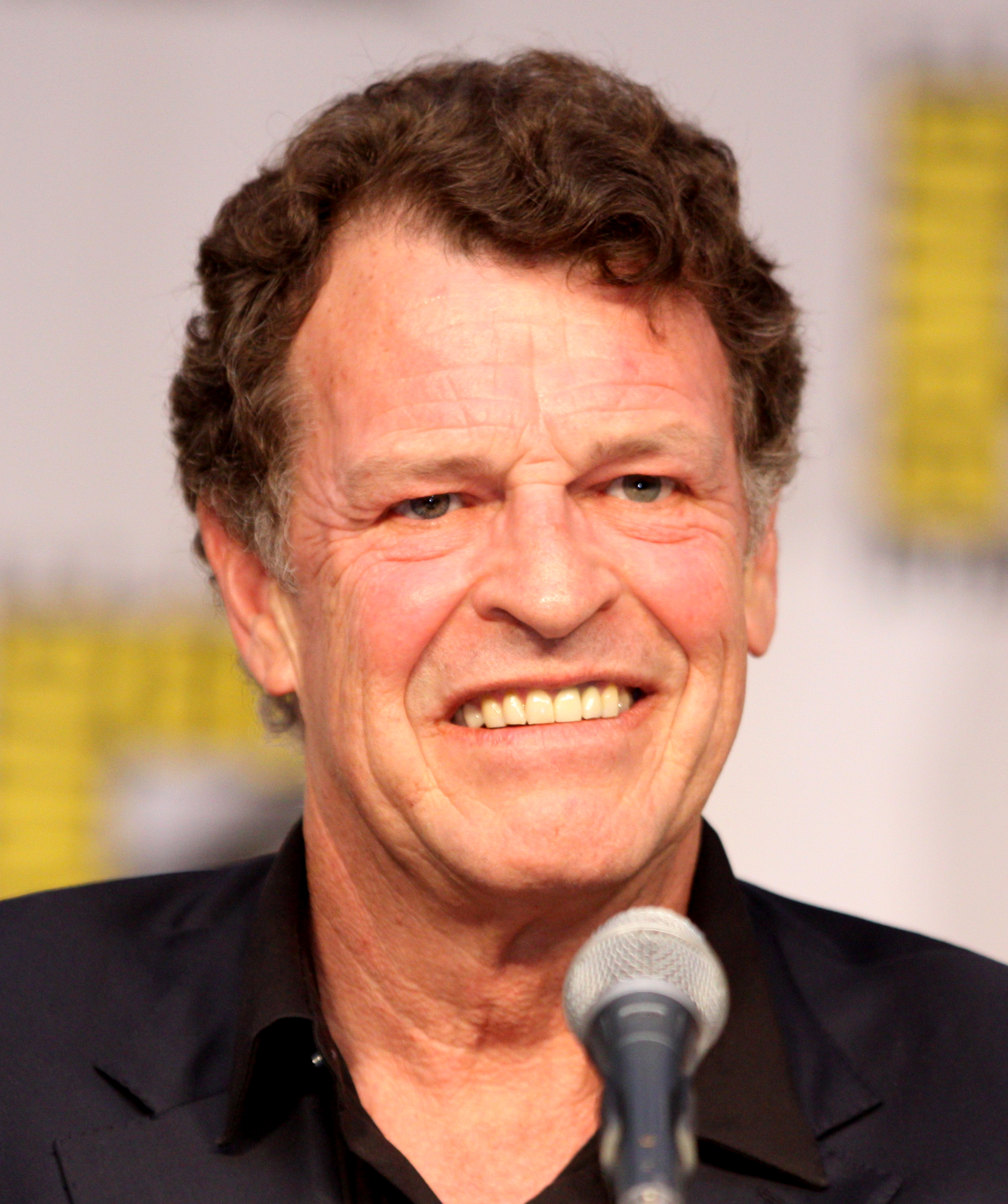
Actor John Noble (pictured) has his first scene with guest actor Leonard Nimoy in the episode.

"Grey Matters" was written by screenwriters Ashley Edward Miller and Zack Stentz, and was directed by Jeannot Szwarc. In an interview the following year, Miller noted that "Your characters will often assert themselves, and remind you who they really are. In 'Grey Matters' there's a moment where pre-madness Walter wakes up in the chair — that beat emerged on the page. We had no idea it was going to be in the script until we were writing the scene. As a writer, you live for that."

"Grey Matters" marked the first episode that featured a shared scene between actors Leonard Nimoy and John Noble, whose characters are old colleagues of each other. At the time, it was Nimoy's third episode and consequently last commitment as a guest actor on Fringe, and he had expressed his reluctance in interviews to return for further episodes. Nimoy later agreed, however, to a reappearance in the two-part season finale "Over There". The visual effect of making Walter and Bell appear younger was produced by Zoic Studios. Fringe's visual effects supervisor, Jay Worth, explained "The guys at Zoic had to walk a fine line between too plasticky, stretched, morph effects and something that naturalistically looks younger". During filming for "Brown Betty", Noble described the episode in an interview, "'Grey Matters' was a very important episode for Walter because it helped to explain to some degree his apparent behavior. His eccentricity. His obsessiveness. His forgetfulness. Because we found out that he had certain memory parts of his brain removed."

In a deleted scene set after the end of the episode, Walter talks with the first patient Joseph Slater, who wonders why he was chosen to have a piece of Walter's brain. Walter responds it was a matter of circumstance, as Slater shared his blood type and had a young resilient brain. Walter also says he himself cannot be cured, as his madness had nothing to do with the missing parts of his brain.

== Cultural references ==
William Bell's secret alias was a reference to Leonard Nimoy's character in the television series Mission: Impossible, whose character was also named Dr. Simon Paris. Thomas Jerome Newton is named after David Bowie's character in The Man Who Fell to Earth.

The episode also includes many references to H.P. Lovecraft and to Stuart Gordon, who directed several Lovecraft adaptations. Dunwich Mental Hospital, where they meet the second mysteriously cured patient, is a reference to the fictional town of Dunwich, Massachusetts, the setting for Lovecraft's "The Dunwich Horror". Dr. West is named for "Herbert West–Reanimator" character Dr. Herbert West, patient Deborah Crampton is named for Barbara Crampton, who starred in Gordon's films Re-Animator and From Beyond, and Jeffrey Perry's character, Joseph Slater, is likely named for Joe Slater, protagonist of "Beyond the Wall of Sleep".

== Reception ==
=== Ratings ===
In its original American broadcast on December 10, 2009, "Grey Matters" was watched by an estimated 6.33 million viewers according to Nielsen Media Research. The episode earned a 2.3 ratings among people 18–49, slightly above the season average of 2.2; it was down 0.2 ratings points from the previous week.

=== Reviews ===
The episode premiered to near universal critical acclaim. Ramsey Isler of IGN gave it 9.6/10, and thought it was "one of the most balanced and well-executed episodes of the series, Fringe fans get action, suspense, emotion, and best of all, some revelations!... This episode is nearly everything a Fringe fan could have asked for... Besides the awesomeness with the Bishops, Olivia finally returns to taking an active role in an episode... But the most important thing is that the overarching Fringe plot finally progressed, and it's going in a pretty damn good direction". Jane Boursaw from TV Squad enjoyed the episode because it had a "few reveals and a nice cliffhanger." She liked the interactions between Walter and Peter, and also praised the scene between Olivia and Newton. Josh Wigler of MTV was pleased that the "mystery of the week" also tied into the ongoing plot, and that answers were provided to certain mysteries, such as why Walter's behavior and personality is "a little...off. Pretty interesting stuff. It's nice to finally have a reason to point at for Walter's craziness".

Ken Tucker of Entertainment Weekly thought it "was one of the best Fringes yet for the way it wove its sci-fi with its emotional subplots with such tight, artful braiding". Television Without Pity rated it an A, while The A.V. Club's Noel Murray gave the episode an A-, explaining "This was, I think, the best Fringe of the season, and I’m only docking it a notch because it was less about themes and character than it was about plot. But man, what a plot". Various critics lauded Noble's performance. Website blogger io9 listed "Grey Matters" as one of the few "crucial" episodes new viewers must watch to get into the show. In January 2013, IGN ranked the episode the sixth best of the entire series, explaining that the "story is brilliant, with twists and turns and remarkable acting by both John Noble and Joshua Jackson as they portray a bond that's closer than anything else up to that point... This fantastic episode was an early Christmas present for Fringe fans."

=== Awards and nominations ===
Director Jeannot Szwarc submitted "Grey Matters" for the Primetime Emmy Award for Outstanding Directing for a Drama Series category at the 62nd Primetime Emmy Awards.
