= Fringe season 2 =

Fringe
- Season 2
- Region 1 DVD cover
- No. of episodes: 23

Release
- Original network: Fox
- Original release: September 17, 2009 – May 20, 2010

Season chronology
- ← Previous; Season 1 Next → Season 3

The second season of the American science fiction television series Fringe commenced airing on the Fox network on September 17, 2009, and concluded on May 20, 2010. The season was produced by Bad Robot in association with Warner Bros. Television, and its showrunners were Jeff Pinkner and J. H. Wyman. Actors Anna Torv, John Noble, and Joshua Jackson reprised their roles as FBI agent Olivia Dunham and father-son duo Walter and Peter Bishop, respectively. Previous series regulars Lance Reddick, Jasika Nicole, Blair Brown, and Kirk Acevedo also returned, though with Acevedo in a limited capacity.

The season followed the continuation of a war between two universes, the prime and the parallel. It was set in the former, until the last several episodes when Peter Bishop (Jackson) journeyed back to the parallel universe after being lured there by his real father, "Walternate" (Noble). While co-creator J. J. Abrams described the first season as "identifying that there is an enemy", he referred to season two as "getting to know the enemy" as it "build[s] to a very specific type of confrontation" between the two universes. The writers focused on their characters' development, in particular making them more comfortable with each other while solving cases for Fringe Division. By inventing the "mythalone" style of episode, the producers sought to create the perfect episode that mixed standalone episode qualities for casual viewers with the further development of the series' mythology for regular viewers.

In a departure from the previous season, the second season aired in a new competitive timeslot at 9:00 pm on Thursdays. It contained 22 episodes, plus an unaired episode that was produced during the first season; "Unearthed" aired as a special as episode 11 of season two, days prior to "Johari Window", the first new episode of 2010. Also part of the season was the series' only musical episode, "Brown Betty", which was produced at the request of the network. The season finale, "Over There", fully introduced the parallel universe and laid the groundwork for the third season.

Fringe ended its second season with a per episode average of 6.252 million total viewers and a 2.3 ratings share in the 18–49 demographic. The season was generally well-received by critics, though most agreed that the second half was a considerable improvement over the first. The series was chosen for a number of 2010 "best of television" lists, including The New York Times, the Seattle Post-Intelligencer, and Entertainment Weekly. Despite its critical acclaim, Fringe failed to earn any major category nominations at the 62nd Primetime Emmy Awards, but did receive nominations at the Creative Arts Emmy Awards, Golden Reel Awards, and Satellite Awards; at the Saturn Awards, Torv and guest actor Leonard Nimoy won in their respective categories. The second season was released on DVD and Blu-ray in region 1 on September 14, 2010, in region 2 on September 27, and in region 4 on November 10.

== Season summary ==
Olivia, having been taken to William Bell's office in the parallel universe, is returned to the prime universe but with short term amnesia, unable to recall her experience there. Massive Dynamic's Nina Sharp directs her to Sam Weiss, a bowling alley manager, who gives her cryptic but helpful advice to overcome her amnesia. Meanwhile, the Fringe division has discovered several shapeshifters - a human/machine hybrid that bleed mercury - have crossed over, but unbeknownst to them, one takes the form of Olivia's partner, Charlie. When Sam's advice allows Olivia to recall what Bell told her, she unwittingly gives this information to the shapeshifter, who calls its agents to use the information to recover the body of Thomas Jerome Newton, an agent for some entity operating from the parallel universe. Nina provides Olivia with cautionary advice, alerting her to a "great war" that Bell postulated would occur between the two universes. During this time, Peter has come to forgive Walter for his past, and Walter has grown accustomed to normal life outside of the institution, but is still troubled by a secret.

Newton, using old technology from Walter and Bell's research, is able to pull an entire building from the parallel universe to the prime, and the team races against time to prevent harm when, due to the laws of mass conservation, a building from the prime is pulled to the parallel one. This event forces Walter to try to coax Olivia to recall her Cortexiphan abilities so as to identify things affected by the parallel universe. Initially unable to do so, her fear of failure enables her ability, allowing them to save the people within the target building, but also revealing to her that Peter is from the parallel universe. Walter explains to Olivia that in 1985, he and Bell had devised a way to observe the parallel universe, where he found his doppelgänger, "Walternate", was also close to losing his son. Though Walter's Peter had died, Walternate continued to search for a cure, but missed the telltale sign when the Observer September arrived at his lab. Walter resynthesized the cure and aimed to cross over using untested equipment at Reiden Lake, though stalled by Nina and his lab assistant Clara. Nina tackled him on his way over, losing her arm in the process, while Walter, on the other side, found the cure vial broken. Intent on curing the alternate Peter, he posed as his father and crossed back with Peter, intending to administer the cure at the lab and then return Peter. However, on the return, the ice on Reiden Lake broke, threatening to drown both, but they were saved by September, who cautioned Walter "the boy must live". While Walter successfully administered the cure, his wife Elizabeth saw Peter, and Walter realized he could never return Peter to the parallel universe. After Walter reveals this truth, he considers letting Peter know but struggles with how to do so, hoping to seek repentance from God for his actions.

Meanwhile, Newton has continued to use Walter's technology to bring into temporary existence elements from the parallel universe. This enables Newton and his agents to bring over a figure known as "Mr. Secretary", despite Fringe's attempts to stop them. Peter, from this action, deduces that he is from the parallel universe, and furious at Walter for hiding this information, leaves on his own. While hiding in the Pacific Northwest, Peter meets Mr. Secretary - Walternate, his true father, who offers to take him back to the parallel universe, which Peter accepts. Olivia and Walter are alerted by September that Walternate plans to use Peter to initiate the operation of a strange device that threatens to destroy the prime universe, and the two launch a rescue attempt. In the parallel universe, they find that it suffers from singularities caused by Walter's crossing in 1985, forcing Walternate's Fringe team to use an amber-like substance to surround and quarantine such areas, regardless of innocent lives trapped within. They meet with William Bell, and Walter and Bell resolve their past differences. Olivia faces off against her doppelgänger, "Fauxlivia", who works for Walternate in the Fringe Division under the U.S. Secretary of Defense; she is able to recover Peter, who has seen the device and recognized that it reacted only to his biology, and wants nothing of it, willing to return with the others. As Olivia, Walter, and Peter attempt to return, they are engaged by Fauxlivia and others in the Fringe Division. Bell sacrifices himself to provide energy into a device to allow the three to cross over, but none of them are aware that Fauxlivia has secretly switched places with Olivia under Walternate's orders, while Olivia is captured and held in a secured facility by Walternate.

== Episodes ==
No. overall	No. in season	Title	Directed by	Written by	Original release date	Prod. code	US viewers (millions)
21	1	"A New Day in the Old Town"	Akiva Goldsman	J. J. Abrams & Akiva Goldsman	September 17, 2009	3X5101	7.82
Olivia's SUV is discovered after a car accident in Manhattan, however, Olivia is not inside. Minutes later, she suddenly ejects through the windshield having traveled to the parallel universe and is hospitalized with brain damage. FBI agent Amy Jessup (Meghan Markle) takes an interest in Fringe Division and begins to investigate deeper. The male driver of the car that crashed into Dunham's is revealed to be a shapeshifter 'soldier' from the parallel universe, and is ordered to question Olivia then kill her. When Olivia suddenly awakens from the coma she cannot remember any details and the shapeshifter (now in the form of a female nurse) tries to kill her. Agent Jessup interrupts this, and the shapeshifter escapes into the basement, where Agent Francis appears to shoot the shapeshifter. Broyles travels to Washington, D.C. to defend the Fringe Division, where Peter hands him the shapeshifter's device so Broyles can justify the need for the Division. At the end, it is revealed the shapeshifter had killed Agent Francis and assumed his form.
22	2	"Night of Desirable Objects"	Brad Anderson	Jeff Pinkner & J. H. Wyman	September 24, 2009	3X5102	5.73
Fringe Division investigates a missing road worker who was pulled to a tunnel filled with the remains of six other people who disappeared suddenly. Meanwhile Olivia, now released from the hospital, begins to develop super-hearing, and Nina Sharp advises her to meet Sam Weiss (Kevin Corrigan), a man who can begin to help with the side-effects. The investigation leads to nearby resident Andre Hughes (John Savage), who lost his wife and baby in childbirth. When the bodies are exhumed, they find the baby casket empty. Walter then learns that Hughes genetically altered the baby by incorporating mole and scorpion DNA. When Olivia and Peter enter the basement of the Hughes family house, they are attacked by the now adult baby, but the tunnel collapses, causing a police car to crush the hybrid.
23	3	"Fracture"	Bryan Spicer	David Wilcox	October 1, 2009	3X5103	6.03
A secret military experiment is turning people into human bombs. After one such bomb detonated in a train station, Peter and Olivia travel to Iraq to meet one of Peter's contacts who was involved in the project. They find a list of names from the experiment, the victim in the train station being one of them. They return to find the surviving members, and are able to prevent the next subject from exploding. They find the man responsible (Stephen McHattie) and bring him into custody; the man suggests the bombs were intended to eliminate agents working for the Observer. Also, Weiss cures Olivia's inability to walk without a cane.
24	4	"Momentum Deferred"	Joe Chappelle	Zack Stentz & Ashley Edward Miller	October 8, 2009	3X5104	5.83
A group of shapeshifters are stealing human heads, and it is revealed they are looking for a specific one. Walter visits the woman (Theresa Russell) he experimented on with psychedelics to see what she might still remember about the shapeshifters from her visions; she volunteers to help. After being drugged, she sees the shapeshifters again. Meanwhile, Olivia remembers her meeting with William Bell (Leonard Nimoy). Bell explains what the shapeshifters are looking for, and states she is the only person able to stop "The Storm". Olivia meets Nina, who explains that "The Storm" is an event that Bell theorized; when two universes merge, only one will remain in existence. This is what the shapeshifters are trying to cause. Later, Olivia discovers Charlie is dead and that a shapeshifter has replaced him, and kills him. The shapeshifters find the head they are looking for, and attach it to its body.
25	5	"Dream Logic"	Paul Edwards	Josh Singer	October 15, 2009	3X5105	5.78
In Seattle a man attacks his boss believing he is a demon. Walter finds a computer chip attached to the thalamus, the part of the brain controlling dreams. Broyles and Sharp reveal new information leading to the sleep researcher who implanted the chips. Walter changes his theory; the dreams are being stolen from their hosts to cause a "high" in the researcher, who is receiving them, and who has two personalities. His doctor personality sets a trap so that Olivia and Peter will catch his alternate persona. Meanwhile, Olivia is grieving for Charlie, murdered by a shapeshifter in the previous episode, and Sam helps her work through it by reminding Olivia of her first meeting with Charlie.
26	6	"Earthling"	Jon Cassar	J. H. Wyman & Jeff Vlaming	November 5, 2009	3X5106	4.86
The Fringe Division is flummoxed by a case where victims are inexplicably disintegrated into ash. Broyles takes a particular interest in the case, as he worked on it in the past. He says that everyone who died had recently been to a hospital. The investigation leads the team to Russia, where they learn Fringe science is taking place in other countries as well. A man sent to space came back with a dark entity in him, which is stealing people's natural radiation, and killing them. Walter learns that the man and the entity are connected and cannot be separated, so Broyles kills the man to end the killings. However, the CIA reveals that the cosmonaut resurrected, and it is implied that he was sent into deep space, never to return.
27	7	"Of Human Action"	Joe Chappelle	Robert Chiappetta & Glen Whitman	November 12, 2009	3X5107	5.91
Tyler Carson (Cameron Monaghan), the son of a Massive Dynamic employee (Andrew Airlie), is kidnapped by two people who are believed to be using mind control to avoid capture. However, at the money dropoff, the team learn that Tyler is the one who is using mind control after Peter is taken hostage. Walter suspects that Tyler took some of the enhancement drugs being developed to allow pilots to mentally fly their planes. Peter realizes Tyler kidnapped himself to both hurt his father and to find his lost mother. Walter devises a way to "shut down" Tyler's brain for a few seconds and Peter crashes the getaway vehicle. In the end, Massive Dynamic takes Tyler into custody, and a file reveals that there are a number of Tyler clones. Nina Sharp reports the incident to William Bell.
28	8	"August"	Dennis Smith	J. H. Wyman & Jeff Pinkner	November 19, 2009	3X5108	5.90
An Observer, "August" (Peter Woodward) abducts a woman in Boston who is meant to take a flight which will crash, killing everyone on board. Knowing of "August's" actions, the other Observers send an assassin (Paul Rae) to kill the girl. "August" arranges a meeting with Walter, who tells him that the girl can be saved if she becomes important. When the assassin arrives at the girl's location, Peter and Olivia kill him, though "August" is mortally wounded in the process. The original Observer, "September" (Michael Cerveris) informs "August" the girl is now important, having been responsible for the death of an Observer. A scientist from Massive Dynamic researches the Observers, and reveals they have been around throughout history, hypothesizing that they are time travelers who appear to observe important historical events. In the end, two Observers remark that everything is about to get worse for Olivia.
29	9	"Snakehead"	Paul Holahan	David Wilcox	December 3, 2009	3X5109	6.94
A damaged cargo ship washes ashore and all of the crew members seem to be infected with squid-like creatures that turn out to be gigantic parasitic worms. The worms are said to be a modified version of Ancylostoma duodenale. While Fringe Division investigates, the clock starts ticking when Olivia, Peter and Broyles discover a terrifying connection between the incident and a threatening organization.
30	10	"Grey Matters"	Jeannot Szwarc	Ashley Edward Miller & Zack Stentz	December 10, 2009	3X5110	6.32
The team investigate a mental patient, who received brain surgery from a group of shapeshifters, curing his insanity. Viewing security footage, Olivia recognizes Thomas Jerome Newton (Sebastian Roché), the leader of the shapeshifters who was reanimated from the end of "Momentum Deferred". When similar cases occur, the team learn Walter had three pieces of brain tissue removed from his Hippocampus, which were stored in the brains of the cured patients. Knowing only Walter could comprehend the memories concerning how to open a portal to another reality, the shapeshifters kidnap him. By the time Walter is found, Newton has learned what he needs to know and escapes. As Walter undergoes an MRI, he imagines a past surgery, where he is being operated on by William Bell, who removed Walter's brain fragments and hid them in the patients' brains to prevent anyone else from gaining the information.
31	11	"Unearthed"	Frederick E. O. Toye	David H. Goodman & Andrew Kreisberg	January 11, 2010	3T7670	7.72
A seventeen-year-old girl, Lisa (Alice Kremelberg), comes back from the dead. Fringe Division investigates, and it is soon determined that at the same time, a soldier named Rusk was murdered, making them believe Rusk's consciousness has possessed Lisa. The team discovers Rusk is on a mission to take revenge on his wife who had him killed. Walter posits that, due to a heavy radiation exposure, Rusk's energy wasn't completely expended, and thus able to possess Lisa. Rusk possessed Lisa long enough to deal with his wife and until Lisa is eventually able to purge him from her consciousness. Note: The episode was produced as part of season 1, as Charlie Francis is seen alive in the episode. However, it went unaired until season 2.
32	12	"Johari Window"	Joe Chappelle	Josh Singer	January 14, 2010	3X5111	6.60
A child is found by a state trooper who takes him back to the station to find his parents. The child morphs into a deformed creature, and is taken by other deformed people who kill the troopers. The Fringe team investigates, though the disfigured people try to keep the case a secret. Walter remembers an experiment done years ago in the city. The people were deformed in the aftermath of testing done in their town years ago. He discovers that they managed to disguise their deformities via a massive electromagnetic pulse that runs through the town. The pulse causes them to look normal, but only within its range. They will do anything to stay close to it, and attempt to kill Peter and Olivia, who are saved by someone who no longer wants to harm outsiders that discover their secret. The Fringe team decides to keep the town's secret so that the remaining residents can live a normal life.
33	13	"What Lies Below"	Deran Sarafian	Jeff Vlaming	January 21, 2010	3X5112	6.90
After a man's veins erupt with blood infected with a lethal virus, investigating agents Olivia and Peter are quarantined with the rest of those exposed. Walter, Broyles and Astrid race to find a cure. After discovering during a test that Olivia and Peter are not infected, it later becomes clear that Peter is when his nose starts to bleed before he reaches the outdoors. While the virus overtakes Peter's health and sanity, Walter becomes more and more distressed as he fears losing his son again, and accidentally blurts out that he "can't let Peter die again" to Astrid. The two of them eventually find a panacea derived from horseradish, and with the help of Astrid, they cure the disease in Peter and anyone else who was infected. Astrid later approaches Walter and asks what he meant when he said he couldn't let Peter die again, to which he responds by saying "some things are better off left alone."
34	14	"The Bishop Revival"	Adam Davidson	Glen Whitman & Robert Chiappetta	January 28, 2010	3X5113	8.90
When a select few people are suffocated from the inside out during a wedding, the Fringe Division investigate. After another attack at a coffee shop, Walter believes the toxin the terrorist is using is targeting certain ethnicities in people through their genes. He also discovers that the killer is over 100 years old, and was a Nazi; Walter's father, Robert Bischoff (renamed to Bishop afterwards) was also revealed to be involved in the project during the 1940s. The team find out the next target, where Walter is able to turn the toxin against the killer, killing him; in the end, Olivia and Broyles decide against arresting Walter for the death.
35	15	"Jacksonville"	Charles Beeson	Ashley Edward Miller & Zack Stentz	February 4, 2010	3X5114	7.40
After a building in Manhattan is destroyed after it merges with the same building from an alternate world, Walter believes another building of the same mass will disappear, along with anybody inside it. In order to uncover which building, the team rely on Olivia's ability to recognize objects from the other universe. When she cannot, they travel to Jacksonville, Florida, where Walter experimented on her and other Cortexiphan subjects. There, Walter discovers Olivia can find the building if she feels fear, which she is no longer able to do, however, upon returning to Manhattan, Olivia becomes afraid for not being able to save the people, and is able to use her ability again. After evacuating the building before it disappears, Olivia visits Peter and Walter's house. Because of her ability, she realizes Peter is from the alternate world; Walter pleads with Olivia not to tell Peter.
36	16	"Peter"	David Straiton	Story by : J. H. Wyman & Jeff Pinkner & Akiva Goldsman & Josh Singer; Teleplay by : Jeff Pinkner & J. H. Wyman & Josh Singer	April 1, 2010	3X5115	5.97
Walter visits and explains to Olivia how, in 1985, he invented a window-like device that allowed him to witness events in the parallel universe. A younger Walter observes that, in the alternate universe, the other Walter (whom he nicknames "Walternate") is working on a cure for the genetic condition that is killing young Peter in both universes. One evening, however, Peter dies in Walter's arms. After the funeral, Walter witnesses Walternate synthesizing the cure. However, Walternate is distracted by an Observer and misses seeing the experimental result that confirms his success. Walter then decides to perfect the cure and administer it to the alternate Peter. Walter finishes the medicine and travels to Reiden Lake to open a portal. Nina, alerted by Walter's colleague, tries to stop him, fearing that breaking the barrier between the two universes will destroy both. In their struggle, Walter falls, but reaches the portal; Nina grabs him as it closes, and her arm is damaged by the energy. Walter's fall breaks the vial of medicine. He picks up Peter and returns to the other side to make more of the cure, but the frozen lake cracks beneath them and they fall through the ice. The Observer September saves them, explaining to Walter that Peter is important and must live. After curing Peter, Walter recants his original idea to return him because both he and Elizabeth, Peter's mother, do not wish to lose him again.
37	17	"Olivia. In the Lab. With the Revolver."	Brad Anderson	Matthew Pitts	April 8, 2010	3X5116	6.33
A woman dies from an advanced stage of cancer that she has not contracted. After more deaths, the team realize the victims were Cortexiphan subjects, and that the killer is transferring his own cancer to them to delay his own death. The murderer, James Heath, eventually tracks down Olivia and attempts to transfer the cancer onto her, but she fights back long enough for Peter to save her. Massive Dynamic puts Heath into a coma until they can work on his ability. Also, throughout the episode, Olivia ultimately decides not to tell Peter of his origin, but Walter believes it is time to tell him.
38	18	"White Tulip"	Thomas Yatsko	J. H. Wyman & Jeff Vlaming	April 15, 2010	3X5117	6.62
MIT astrophysics professor Alistair Peck (Peter Weller) is experimenting on his own body to convert himself into a time machine to travel back in time to save his fiancée, who was killed in a car accident several months before. He travels back to a train; this causes the train, and the passengers, to be drained of power. When Fringe Division fails to stop him, he goes back in time again. The second time, Walter volunteers to try to stop him alone. During their meeting, Walter shares his belief that ever since he took Peter from the parallel universe, God may be punishing him. Walter says he is looking for forgiveness in the form of a white tulip. After Peck escapes, he is able to accomplish traveling back to his fiancée and reunites with her, before they both die in the car crash. The events before Peck's escape never took place, but Walter is seen writing a letter to Peter about his origins; however, he later burns it upon finishing. In the end, he receives a letter from Peck which contains a simple drawing of a white tulip, telling Walter to forgive himself.
39	19	"The Man from the Other Side"	Jeffrey Hunt	Josh Singer & Ethan Gross	April 22, 2010	3X5118	5.84
Olivia and the team investigate the deaths of two teenagers displaying wounds that are trademarks of the shapeshifters, and discover an embryo, which is revealed to be a growing shapeshifter. Newton is planning to set up a series of beacons in different locations to open a portal to the parallel universe. Fringe Division eventually discovers the portal is going to open on a derelict bridge. Peter manages to set up a wave cancellation device to close the portal, despite the likelihood it could kill him; he is knocked out by the closing. After waking up a day later, he realizes that he saw a man from the other side that seems to be immune to the effects, and since he too was immune, he realizes he is from the parallel universe, and is angry at Walter for stealing him. In the end, Olivia reveals to Walter that Peter has checked himself out of the hospital and is gone.
40	20	"Brown Betty"	Seith Mann	Jeff Pinkner & J. H. Wyman & Akiva Goldsman	April 29, 2010	3X5119	5.55
Olivia sends her niece, Ella, to the lab for Walter and Astrid to look after while Olivia has to leave. To pass the time, Walter (who has just smoked his own special blend of marijuana called "Brown Betty") tells Ella a detective noir story, where Olivia, a private investigator, takes a case from her client (Rachel) to find her missing boyfriend (Peter), who is in possession of an artificial heart. Later, Olivia finds Rachel dead with her heart missing. This leads her to a scientist, Walter, who is creating inventions to benefit humanity, and believes Peter stole the artificial heart. While following Nina Sharp, Olivia is kidnapped, but saved by Peter. He reveals that the heart is his and that Walter is responsible for stealing dreams from children for his inventions and is replacing them with nightmares. After Peter's heart is then stolen during an Observer raid, they trace the attack back to Walter and confront him. In the original ending, Peter does not forgive Walter, but disappointed with it, Ella changes it to a happy one where Walter, Peter and Olivia live happily ever after. In the end, September notes Peter's disappearance.
41	21	"Northwest Passage"	Joe Chappelle	Ashley Edward Miller & Zack Stentz & Nora Zuckerman & Lilla Zuckerman	May 6, 2010	3X5120	5.82
Peter travels to a small town and gets involved with the disappearance and murder of a young woman, Krista, after she made plans to meet him but never showed up. Initially, the police suspects Peter was involved in the disappearance, but Peter decides to aid them in the investigation after catching a glimpse of Newton, believing the shapeshifters are responsible and are coming after him; however, he does not wish Walter to be involved. Later, town Sheriff Mathis (Martha Plimpton) notices her partner is missing. After they go to the scene of Krista's murder, Peter encounters Newton, but they get away. Peter begins to doubt the shapeshifters' motives after another body is found, but eventually comes up with an idea to read and track the victims' adrenaline spikes, which allows him to find where the murders took place; a dairy farm. They find the owner, who confesses to killing the women because they rejected him, and to kidnapping and torturing Mathis's partner when he discovered the culprit. In the end, Peter decides and prepares to head back to Boston, but is approached by Newton, who has brought "Mr. Secretary", the man from the Other Side, to see Peter; the man is his actual father from the parallel universe, "Walternate".
42	22	"Over There (Part 1)"	Akiva Goldsman	J. H. Wyman & Jeff Pinkner & Akiva Goldsman	May 13, 2010	3X5121	6.00
Walter and Olivia discover that Peter has agreed to go with his real father, "Walternate", back to his own dimension. An Observer leaves them a paper indicating Peter to be the major subject of a prophecy which foretells him being the one responsible for the end of the world. In order to warn Peter of this role, the Fringe Division come up with a way to cross over, amplifying Olivia's dimension-hopping ability with three other Cortexiphan subjects: Nick, Sally, and James. They along with Walter and Olivia successfully head over to the Other Side, where James dies of cancer. The others manage to avoid capture by the alternate Fringe Division. Walter's team heads to meet William Bell at Central Park, but is split up when they believe that Bell has betrayed their location and the alternate Fringe Division attacks them. Nick and Sally are killed, but not before seriously burning the Fringe principal investigator, Lincoln Lee. Walter is shot and hospitalized. Olivia follows her alternate counterpart and encounters Bell, who insists he never betrayed them, and tells her that Walter is in trouble. Walternate is seen leaving with the final component of the device Peter will be a part of.
43	23	"Over There (Part 2)"	Akiva Goldsman	Jeff Pinkner & J. H. Wyman & Akiva Goldsman	May 20, 2010	3X5122	5.68
William Bell and Olivia rescue Walter from the hospital. Walternate falsely tells Peter that the machine can help heal the other world. Peter meets Fauxlivia, who drives him to his new apartment. Walter and Bell go to Harvard to collect equipment needed to return home. Olivia confronts Fauxlivia, knocks her unconscious and poses as her. Peter discovers the machine is symbiotic and needs him in particular to control it. A disguised Olivia and an oblivious Alter-Charlie go to collect Peter to move him for his own safety. Olivia knocks out Alter-Charlie and reveals herself to Peter, telling them the machine's real purpose and Walternate's intentions. Peter states he doesn't belong in either world. Olivia reveals her feelings for Peter, convincing him to leave with her. They race to meet with Walter and Bell at the Opera House, but Fauxlivia and Fringe commandos catch up with them. Bell and Olivia hold them off while Peter and Walter set up the dimensional device to return home. Without power for the device, Bell sacrifices himself to create a nuclear reaction using his body's unstable molecular state. Olivia, Walter, and Peter return home successfully. Peter tells Walter he'll never understand him, but forgives him because he has travelled twice to another universe to save his life. Olivia goes to await orders and is revealed to be Fauxlivia infiltrating our side. The Olivia from our world is seen in a military detention center on the other side. Walternate visits her, staring at her before leaving her in solitary confinement.

== Development ==
=== Crew ===
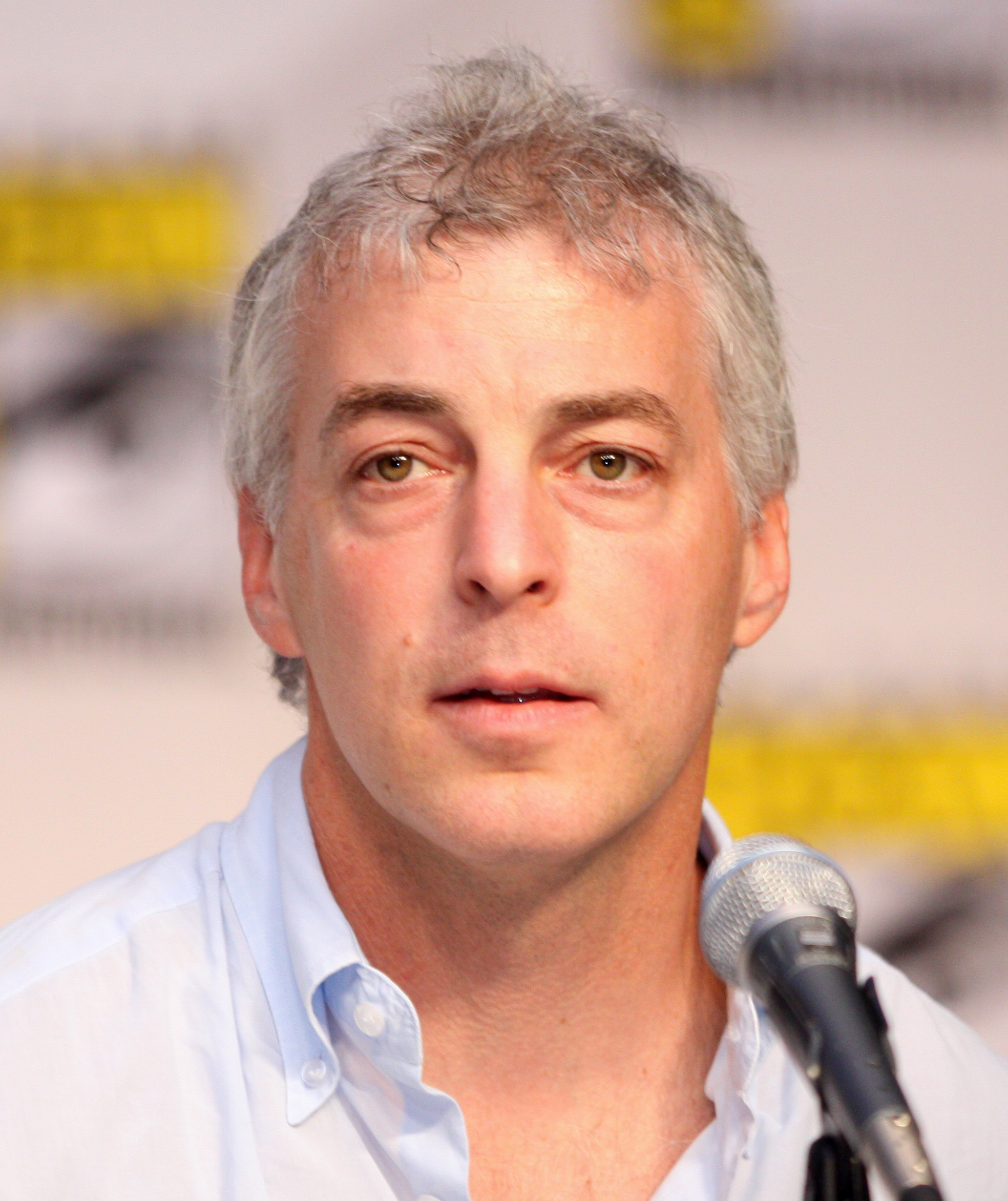
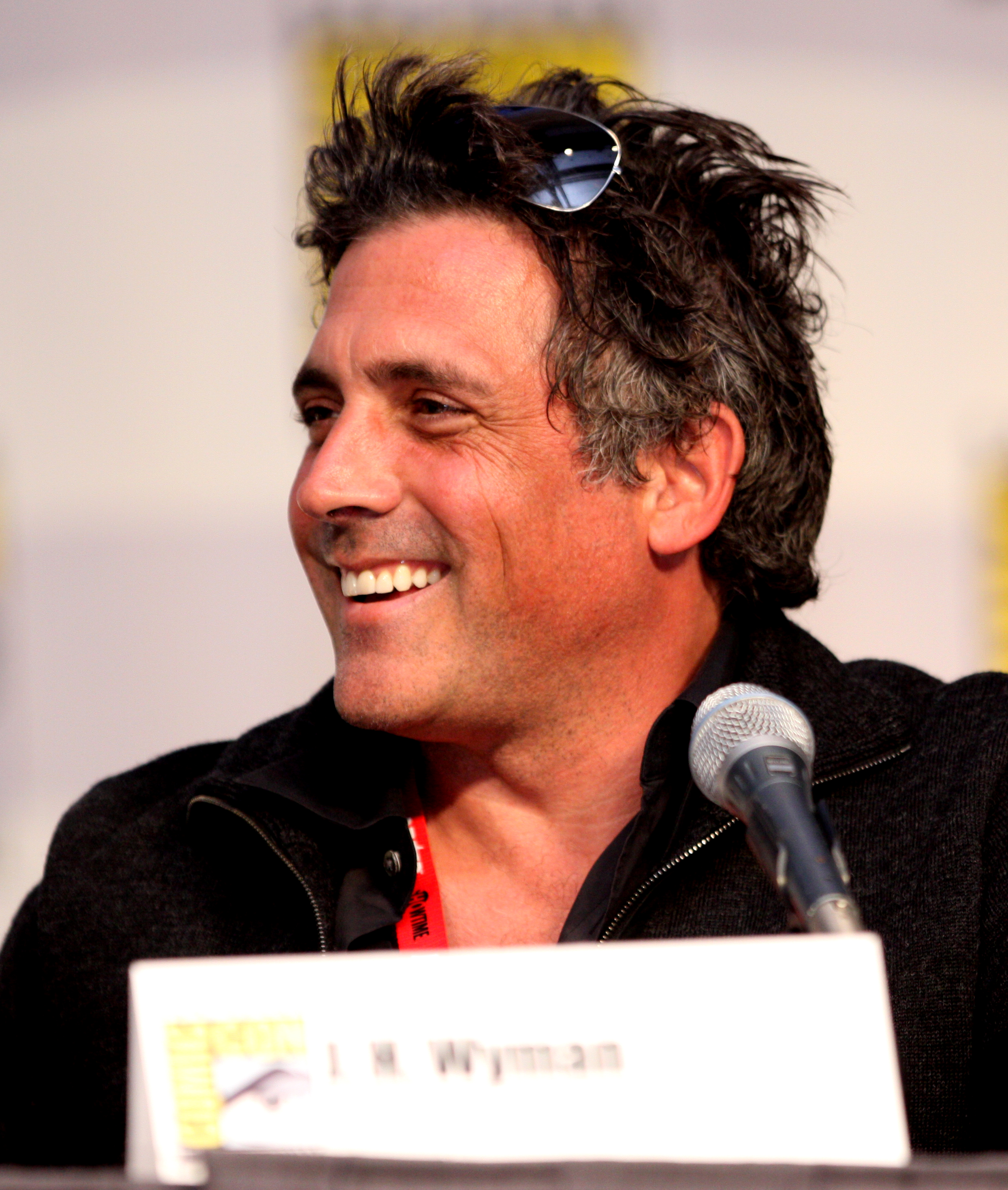
Jeff Pinkner (left) and J.H. Wyman (right) returned as showrunners and executive producers of Fringe.

The season was produced by Bad Robot in association with Warner Bros. Television. Though still set in Boston, the show's production for the second season moved from New York City to Vancouver out of financial necessity, as it lost access to New York's TV production tax incentive program. Fringe consequently got a mostly new writing staff and production team, though co-creators J. J. Abrams, Roberto Orci, and Alex Kurtzman, and producer Bryan Burk remained involved with the series. Jeff Pinkner and J.H. Wyman returned as executive producers and showrunners. Jeff Vlaming and previous episode director Akiva Goldsman joined the crew as consulting producers. While Abrams had six episode writing credits for the first season he remained much more hands-off for the second, instead focusing on other commitments like the film Star Trek. He explained, "Sometimes we'll talk every day. Then there will be a period of a couple weeks where we don't speak. But we're emailing a lot. There's a lot of stuff that happens that way." Eden FX and Zoic Studios stayed as vendors for the series' visual effects, effectively giving Fringe a sense of continuity. Jay Worth, the overall visual effects supervisor, commented that having these two companies "helped the show not feel as a big of a bump from one season to the next, particularly with different crews and a different vibe a little bit." Despite his decreased involvement, Abrams was sent all of the visual effects for the series during production, and responded back with notes and tweaks.

=== Writing and filming ===
Responding to criticism that some first season episodes were too neatly wrapped and solved, Jeff Pinkner commented towards the end of that season, "We found that, absolutely, early on, we were falling into the trap of—the tease would be fantastic. And then we would too quickly answer it and [reduce] the tension. And we've tried to course-correct and have the tease promise" questions that don't get answered right away. He further elaborated that the goal now is to "have the energy of the show get bigger as [an episode] goes along... We're learning how to tell this version of a detective story. It's not really a police procedural. There are elements of that. But it's an incredible mish-mash of genres. I think we're getting better at finding our way through these stories."

"In this season we're really looking to get deeper into our characters and have people really participate with them and watch their evolution, whether it's Walter's emancipation this season and how he's having more of his own awakening. Whether it's Peter in discovering things about himself and about the others he works with and his place in the world. And Olivia the same regard."

— J.H. Wyman

Pinkner, Abrams, Orci, Burk, Kurtzman, Wyman, and Goldsman developed the second season's storyline together. Goldsman explained that they "mapped" out the season "in a way that we remained fundamentally faithful to". Though they changed certain aspects, they knew where Olivia and Peter were going to start and end up but "got there at different paces than what [they] originally planned". While the first season both focused on Olivia and dealt with discovering the existence of an enemy, the second was designed to "[build] to a very specific type of confrontation" between the two universes. Explained Pinkner, "Season 2 is about the people from 'over there' putting the final pieces of the invasion into play, and explaining why". At the same time, the producers approached the second season as a "journey of self-actualization" and "maturation for our characters." They wanted to make the three main cast members become more comfortable as a team in Fringe Division; Peter thus was written to be more heroic and to go from reluctance to a desire to help his father, while Walter became gradually more independent and "grounded as a human being". They made the secret of Peter's origins one of the main story focuses of the season. While the audience had been made aware of Walter's secret in the season one finale, the producers wanted to "acknowledge it to our characters". All the while Walter was "suffering... and desperately trying to keep it all quiet", Olivia and Peter grew closer to the truth. By "giv[ing] these things time" to develop, Pinkner strove to avoid focusing just on "event, event, event", instead concentrating on the real consequences of Peter and Olivia's eventual discovery.

The second season's mythology was intended to be revealed in small parcels. Throughout the season, Pinkner and Wyman tried to create an episode that best bridged "standalone" traits—needed for casual viewers—with the further advancement of the show's mythology for those who watched regularly. At the start of the season Pinkner believed they had found a "good rhythm" between the two, as the mythology "really [started to] affect the characters, to the point where even the standalone [episodes] advance mythology". After the season ended, Wyman commented at San Diego Comic-Con, "We learned that the fan fans love mythology but there are needs from the networks. We started experimenting with a thing we called 'mythalones', not standalone or myth." Wyman cited the season's 18th episode, "White Tulip" as a prime example, noting "You can see that you're following Walter's journey, it's the right mix." The Fringe producers strove to avoid becoming bogged down in mythology, an issue that they perceived happened in Alias, another J. J. Abrams television series. In a joint statement released midway through the season, Abrams, Pinkner, and Wyman noted that their "only internal rule is that we make every effort to not raise mythological questions merely to string viewers along, but rather to provide answers that generate consequences."

At Fox's request, the writers developed a musical episode, "Brown Betty" to fit into the network's "Fox rocks" campaign in the same vein as its series Glee. While the episode already had most of the necessary elements in place before Fox's request, the producers were able to add the musical theme as a "narrative device" to "explore Walter's feelings" in the aftermath of Peter's discovery and flight. To prepare for the season finale, the producers began developing characteristics of the parallel universe relatively early on. Relating to the two universes' idiosyncrasies, Pinkner and Wyman were both interested in world building and "the concept of choices", such as the differing events that led to the Other Side possessing a still-standing World Trade Center but destroyed White House. Other historical idiosyncrasies included the oxidation of the Statue of Liberty and the use of zeppelins as transportation. They believed that all of their additions were "the texture that actually makes it a world. The richness of detail is what makes it feel real".

As the series began filming in Vancouver, the University of British Columbia campus served as a substitute for Harvard University. Because of its heritage buildings and antique storefronts, many of the scenes set in the alternate universe were shot in New Westminster, an area outside Vancouver. Consulting producer and previous Fringe director Akiva Goldsman returned to direct several episodes, as did producer Brad Anderson, executive producer Joe Chappelle, and producer Paul Edwards. One time guest directors for the season included Bryan Spicer, Jon Cassar, Dennis Smith, Paul Holahan, Jeannot Szwarc, Frederick E. O. Toye, (Note: Note that Toye directed the episode during first season production.) Deran Sarafian, Adam Davidson, Charles Beeson, David Straiton, Thomas Yatsko, Jeffrey Hunt, and Seith Mann.

=== Cast ===
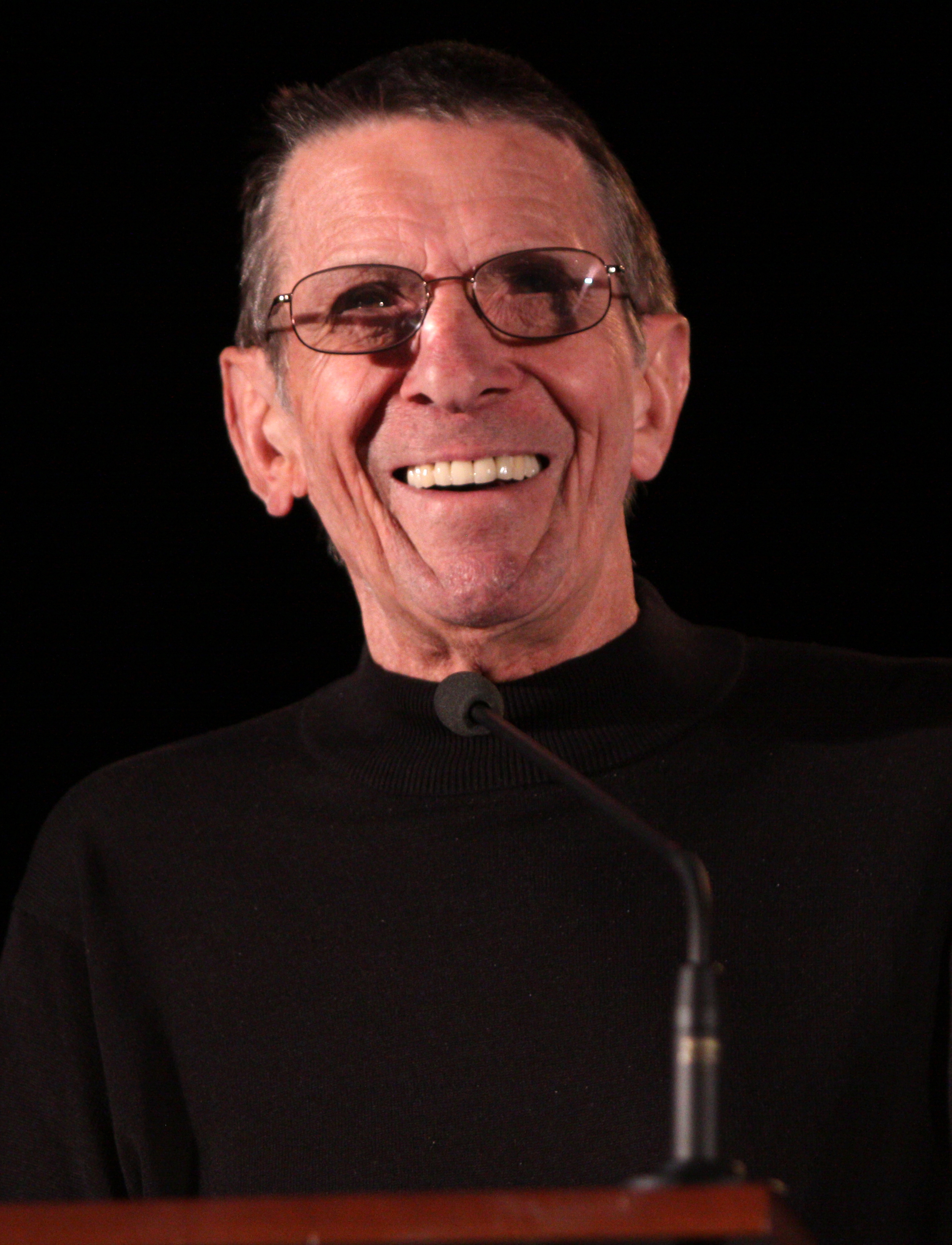
Guest actor Leonard Nimoy appeared in four episodes in the second season.

==== Main cast ====
As with the previous season, the second season featured three main characters all working together to solve various Fringe cases. Anna Torv played determined FBI agent Olivia Dunham, who is able to travel between universes as a result of childhood experiments performed on her with the nootropic drug, Cortexiphan. The man responsible for these experiments, Dr. Walter Bishop, was played by John Noble. Walter's son Peter Bishop, whom he stole from the parallel universe, was portrayed by Joshua Jackson. Other members of the main cast included Jasika Nicole as Junior FBI Agent and Walter's lab assistant Astrid Farnsworth, Lance Reddick as Agent Phillip Broyles, Blair Brown as Massive Dynamic executive Nina Sharp, and Kirk Acevedo as Agent Charlie Francis. Acevedo's character was killed off in the season's fourth episode, though at the time Pinkner and Wyman hinted of the actor's possible return later in the season. Acevedo returned to guest star in the season finale as the parallel universe version of Charlie Francis. Acevedo was also featured in "Unearthed", a special episode that was filmed during the first season, but aired as the eleventh episode of the second season.

==== Recurring cast ====
The second season marked a large number of recurring guest appearances. Michael Cerveris played September/The Observer, a mysterious man that observes important events and appeared in every episode of the season, often merely in brief glimpses. Further Observers were revealed, including August (Peter Woodward) and December (Eugene Lipinski). Ryan McDonald portrayed Massive Dynamic scientist Brandon Fayette, while its founder, Dr. William Bell was played by Leonard Nimoy, despite the actor's recent retirement. (Note: Nimoy appeared in three of the season's episodes and despite announcing his retirement agreed to guest star in the season premiere as well. According to Jeff Pinkner, "We had a story for William that we got to tell. Leonard has retired twice, he's our Bret Farve [sic]. We had him in and talked him through where we wanted it to end in season two and he said 'ok, I'll come back.' He was so unbelievably gracious. [The role] was not created with him in mind but it was the perfect mix. He was nervous that we just wanted him for promotional reasons but we wanted to give him a swan song role.") Thomas Jerome Newton, one of the season's main villains, was played by Sebastian Roché. Kevin Corrigan portrayed Samuel Weiss, a mysterious man who helps Olivia recover from her injuries. Ari Graynor appeared as Olivia's sister Rachel Dunham, while Lily Pilblad played Rachel's daughter and Olivia's niece Ella Blake. Orla Brady played Walter's wife Elizabeth Bishop. A new FBI agent, Amy Jessup, was portrayed by Meghan Markle. Roger Cross appeared as a shapeshifter. Former Cortexiphan subjects James Heath and Nick Lane were played by Omar Metwally and David Call, respectively. Karen Holness appeared as Broyles' ex-wife Diane, and Clark Middleton played rare book seller Edward Markham. Philip Winchester appeared as Fauxlivia's boyfriend Frank Stanton, while Seth Gabel played Agent Lincoln Lee from the parallel universe, both in the finale. J. R. Bourne played Agent Edwards, and Gerard Plunkett appeared as Senator James Van Horn.

Further notable guest stars included Andrew Airlie, Stefan Arngrim, Demore Barnes, Jenni Blong, Pascale Hutton, Ravil Isyanov, Ravi Kapoor, Alice Kremelberg, Diane Kruger, Quinn Lord, Tzi Ma, Stephen McHattie, Jennifer Missoni, Cameron Monaghan, Michael O'Neill, Geoff Pierson, Martha Plimpton, Paul Rae, John Savage, Peter Weller, and Craig Robert Young.

== Reception ==
=== Ratings and broadcast ===
Fringe's first season ended with an average of 9.96 million viewers, and among the season's new series, it was the first rated show for adults 18–49. On May 4, 2009, a week before the season one finale, Fox renewed Fringe for a second season, giving it a full season pick-up of 22 episodes. The network's president of entertainment, Kevin Reilly, explained "Fringe proved to be a notable addition to our schedule all season and it really has fans buzzing as it builds to a fantastic season finale."

Later in May, Fox announced Fringe would be moving from Tuesdays to Thursdays for the second season, to be aired in the competitive 9:00 pm timeslot. Kevin Reilly explained the move, "The door is more open on this night than it has been in a long time. Fringe is a real alternative to both [Grey's and CSI: Crime Scene Investigation]." However, after a perceived "healthy" first season, the second season premiere was watched by an estimated 7.817 million viewers. Ratings for the season continued to decline, culminating in 5.68 million viewers watching the finale. Fringe's second season ended with an average of 6.252 million viewers per episode and a 2.3 ratings share for adults 18–49, causing the series to finish in 79th place out of all the season's network television shows. However, Fringe and its lead-in, Bones, did help the network increase 52% among adults aged 18–49 and 65 percent among total viewers from the same night the previous year. Despite its middling ratings, Fringe received a full-season renewal on March 6, 2010.

=== Reviews ===
The second season of Fringe received generally very favorable reviews. At the beginning of the season, the series was featured on the September 18 cover of Entertainment Weekly, which promised to give readers a "deep dive into the gory, witty world of Fox's Fringe". On Rotten Tomatoes, the season has an approval rating of 81% with an average score of 8.2 out of 10 based on 16 reviews. The website's critical consensus reads, "Fringe surpasses expectations in season two with stronger character development while maintaining its creepy sci-fi angle." Metacritic, a review aggregate website, gave the second season 74/100 based upon ten reviews, indicating a "generally favorable" reception. After viewing the first eight episodes, Entertainment Weekly columnist Ken Tucker gave the series an A−, calling it "one of the fastest, smartest, wittiest shows on television now... Fringe successfully mixes the crime genre with sci-fi, and cold conspiracies with heartfelt emotion." Peter Swanson from Slant Magazine gave Fringe two and a half stars after watching the first six episodes. He believed the second season had "floundered a little, stuck in that creative hinterland between the desire to grab new viewers and the need to build on the mythology of the show's universe." While Swanson understood the need to attract a larger audience, he thought the standalone episodes to be "less than stellar", as "they've yet to get scary, or even vaguely unsettling". Swanson did however find the war between two universes to be "particularly compelling", and expressed hope that "Fringe [would] find its footing."

In a review of the entire second season, IGN believed that despite the premiere's "great start", the first half contained "some rather lackluster episodes" that "made a lot of fans worried and got the rumors of cancellation circulating"; the second half however "showed that Fringe is still one of the best sci-fi series on TV". The A.V. Club agreed, and called the first half "entertaining" but "never essential" while noting a great improvement mid-way through the season, as "the show finally grounded its freak-of-the-week weirdness in deep sadness". The A.V. Club continued, "...The season-two episode "Peter" finally dramatized the moment that changed [Peter's] life, giving the series' overarching storyline a devastating emotional core, based in a father's love instead of in theoretical concepts. It only got better from there, as the series expanded its world by further making those concepts concrete. Fringe is that rare blend of inventive ideas, wild ambition, and unexpected soulfulness." The Seattle Post-Intelligencer believed that by the end of the season "Fringe had truly found its footing, doing daring, experimental episodes like the musical "Brown Betty"... and heartbreaking stand alone episodes, like "White Tulip", (which might be my favorite hour of television this year that wasn't Lost-related)."

In particular, critics highlighted the season premiere "A New Day in the Old Town" as well as regular episodes "Peter" and "White Tulip", and the season finale "Over There". The main three cast members' performances were praised, and various critics noted the series continued the sense of humor seen in the first season. Fringe's second season was chosen for a number of 2010 "best of television" lists, including The New York Times, Entertainment Weekly, Digital Spy, The Daily Beast, the Seattle Post-Intelligencer, AOL's TV Squad, as well as IGN, which named Fringe the best sci-fi series of 2010, beating fellow nominees Lost, Caprica, and Stargate Universe.

=== Awards and nominations ===
At the 62nd Primetime Emmy Awards, actor Joshua Jackson and actress Anna Torv submitted their work in the second season for consideration in the Outstanding Lead Actor in a Drama Series and Outstanding Lead Actress in a Drama Series categories, respectively. Actors John Noble, Lance Reddick, Kirk Acevedo, and actress Blair Brown submitted their work for consideration in the Outstanding Supporting Actor in a Drama Series and Outstanding Supporting Actress in a Drama Series categories, respectively. The second season of Fringe was submitted for consideration in the Outstanding Drama Series category but failed to garner a nomination. The failure of the series to garner any major category nominations at the Emmys was perceived as a notable snub by many media outlets.

The second season received nominations for Sound Editing at the Creative Arts Emmy Awards and at the Golden Reel Awards. The season's sole musical episode, "Brown Betty", received a nomination for Short Form Musical In Television at the Golden Reel Awards. Noble, Torv, and guest actor Leonard Nimoy were nominated at the 2010 Saturn Awards, with Torv and Nimoy winning in their respective categories. Noble also received a nomination at the 2010 Satellite Awards, but lost to Dexter's John Lithgow.

== Home video releases ==
The second season of Fringe was released on DVD and Blu-ray in region 1 on September 14, 2010, in region 2 on September 27, 2010 and in region 4 on November 10, 2010. The sets includes all 22 episodes (plus an unaired episode) of season two on a 6-disc DVD set and a 4-disc Blu-ray set presented in anamorphic widescreen. Special features on the sets include four commentary tracks—"Momentum Deferred" with Jill Risk, Matthew Pitts, Danielle Dispaltro, Justin Doble and Charles Scott IV; "Peter" with John Noble, Blair Brown and Damian Holbrook; "Brown Betty" with Tanya Swerling, Billy Gottlieb, Chris Tilton and Jay Worth; and "Over There, Part 2" with Jeff Pinkner, J. H. Wyman and Akiva Goldsman. Episodic behind-the-scene featurettes include "Analyzing the Scene" on six episodes, "Dissected Files: Unaired Scenes" on select episodes and "Unusual Side Effects: Gag Reel". Other featurettes include "In the Lab with John Noble and Prop Master Rob Smith" and "Beyond the Pattern: The Mythology of Fringe". The unaired episode from season one, "Unearthed", is presented as a special feature, separate from the other episodes.
