= Kirk Acevedo =

American actor (born 1971)

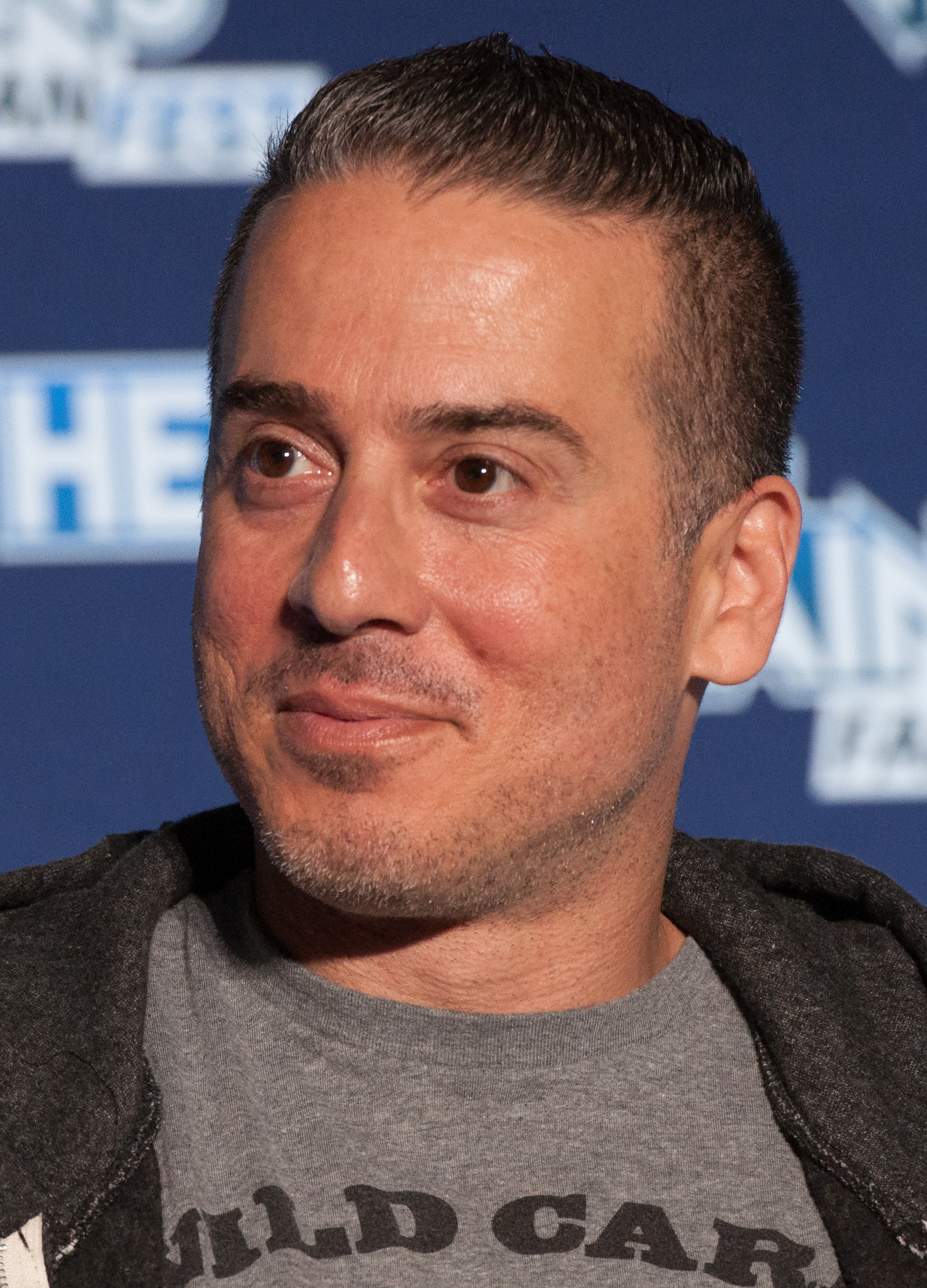
- Acevedo in 2018
- Born: November 27, 1971 (age 54); Brooklyn, New York City, U.S.
- Education: State University of New York, Purchase (BFA)
- Years active: 1994–present
- Spouse: Kiersten Warren (m. 2005)
- Children: 1
- Relatives: Misti Traya (stepdaughter)

Kirkland M. Acevedo (born November 27, 1971) is an American actor best known as Miguel Alvarez in Oz, Joe Toye in Band of Brothers, and FBI Agent Charlie Francis on Fringe. His best-known films are The Thin Red Line, Dinner Rush and Dawn of the Planet of the Apes. He also was José Ramse on 12 Monkeys (2015–18), as well as Ricardo Diaz / The Dragon on Arrow (2017–19).

== Early life ==
Acevedo's parents were born in Brooklyn, New York City and lived in the Bronx, where both their sons, Richard and Kirk Acevedo, were born and raised there. Acevedo is of Puerto Rican descent. Since childhood, Acevedo has shown an interest in acting; he performed before his family in improvised shows. Acevedo was a drama major in high school.

After graduating from LaGuardia High School of Music & Art and Performing Arts, Acevedo enrolled in the SUNY Purchase School of Acting (Purchase College). In the 1990s, Acevedo earned his Bachelor of Fine Arts degree and, as some of his classmates had landed parts shortly after auditioning for Oz, he was also motivated to try out, and subsequently landed the role of the half-crazed gang leader prisoner Miguel Alvarez.

== Career ==
After landing the role of Miguel Alvarez on Oz, Acevedo was promoted to series regular in season two and appeared in the following episodes: 1–26; 34–36 and 41–56. Among his other most notable credits include his roles in Law & Order: Trial by Jury (2005) as Hector Salazar and HBO's Band of Brothers (2001), produced by Steven Spielberg, as Staff sergeant Joe Toye.

He had guest starring roles on well known television shows such as NYPD Blue and 24. He had a notable recurring role on the television show The Black Donnellys.

Some of his most well known movies and miniseries he has starred in include The Thin Red Line, Invincible (2006), Boiler Room (2000), Dinner Rush (2000), Arresting Gena (1997) and Kirk and Kerry (1997). He voices Jackie Estacado in The Darkness, the video game adaptation of the comic book.

In 2008, he landed a supporting role on the Fox science fiction horror television series Fringe as Charlie Francis. He starred on the show's first season and in the episode "Unleashed", Acevedo's real-life wife, actress Kiersten Warren portrayed his on-screen wife. His character was killed in the second season premiere, though Acevedo made two further appearances portraying a shape-shifting imposter. Following the fifth episode of season two, Acevedo was no longer credited as a main cast member due to the shapeshifter's death in the previous episode. Though he is credited as a main cast member for a standalone episode filmed at the end of the first season titled "Unearthed" that was broadcast as the eleventh episode of the second season. His character's reappearance in the episode after being killed off has led to confusion among viewers of the series.

Acevedo officially returned as a guest star in Fringe for the second season finale as the parallel universe version of his character, and continued this recurring role for six episodes of the third season.

In 2011, he joined the main cast of the short-lived American remake of Prime Suspect portraying Detective Luisito Calderon. Initially, it was reported Alt-Charlie would appear in fewer episodes of the fourth season of Fringe, though this never happened and he never reappeared in the series following the third season episode "Bloodline". Acevedo later appeared on The Walking Dead for two episodes of the fourth season.

He has starred in the Syfy television series 12 Monkeys. Acevedo was cast in a recurring role in the sixth season of The CW television series Arrow in August 2017 as Ricardo Diaz and was promoted to series regular for the first 14 episodes of season seven.

== Filmography ==
=== Film ===
Year	Title	Role	Notes
1997	Kirk and Kerry	Kirk	Short film
1998	Arresting Gena	Caller	
1998	The Thin Red Line	Pvt. Vincent Tella	
2000	Boiler Room	Broker	
2000	In the Weeds	Kurt	
2000	The Visit	Prospective Parolee	
2000	Bait	Ramundo	
2000	Dinner Rush	Duncan	
2005	The New World	Sentry	
2006	5up 2down	Santo	
2006	Invincible	Tommy	
2011	Collision Earth	Dr. James Preston	
2014	Dawn of the Planet of the Apes	Carver	
2018	Insidious: The Last Key	Ted Garza	

=== Television ===
Year	Title	Role	Notes
1994	New York Undercover	Joey Claudio	Episode: "Tasha"
1995	New York Undercover	Ramon	Episode: "Tag, You're Dead"
1996	The Sunshine Boys		TV film
1996	Swift Justice	Mark	Episode: "Stones"
1996	Law & Order	Richie Morales	"Corruption"
1997	New York Undercover	Bernard	Episode: "The Promised Land"
1997–2003	Oz	Miguel Alvarez	Recurring role (season 1); Main role (seasons 2–6), 46 episodes
1998	Witness to the Mob	Nicholas Scibetta	TV film
1999	The Sentinel	Ray Aldo	Episode: "Dead End on Blank Street"
2001	Third Watch	Paulie Fuentes	Episodes: "Requiem for a Bantamweight", "Unfinished Business"
2001	Band of Brothers	S/Sgt. Joe Toye	TV miniseries, 6 episodes
2003	Fastlane	Nick McKussick	Episode: "Iced"
2004	Paradise	Manny Marquez	TV film
2004	NYPD Blue	Scott Grafton	Episode: "Take My Wife, Please"
2005	Law & Order: Special Victims Unit	DA Investigator Hector Salazar	Episode: "Night"
2005–2006	Law & Order: Trial by Jury	DA Investigator Hector Salazar	Main role, 13 episodes
2006	Numb3rs	Gino McGinty	Episode: "The Running Man"
2006	24	George Avila	Episode: "Day 5: 2:00 a.m.-3:00 a.m."
2007	Cold Case	Dylan Noakes	Episode: "Thrill Kill"
2007	The Black Donnellys	Nicky Cottero	Main role, 13 episodes
2008–2011	Fringe	Charlie Francis/alt-Charlie	Main role (seasons 1–2); Recurring role (season 3), 36 episodes
2009	White Collar	Ruiz	Episode: "Book of Hours"
2011–2012	Prime Suspect	Det. Luisito Calderon	Main role, 13 episodes
2012	The Mentalist	Christian Dos Santos	Episode: "Red Dawn"
2013	CSI: Crime Scene Investigation	James Boyd	Episode: "In Vino Veritas"
2013	CSI: New York	James Boyd	Episode: "Seth and Apep"
2013	Law & Order: Special Victims Unit	Eddie Garcia	Episode: "October Surprise"
2013	Person of Interest	Timothy Sloan	Episode: "Mors Praematura"
2013	The Walking Dead	Mitch Dolgen	Episodes: "Dead Weight", "Too Far Gone"
2014	Grimm	Ron Hurd	Episode: "The Good Soldier"
2014	Legends	Kyle Dobson	Episodes: "Rogue", "Gauntlet"
2013–2014	Blue Bloods	Javi "Tic-Tac" Baez	Episodes: "Bad Blood", "Partners"
2015	Agents of S.H.I.E.L.D.	Agent Tomas Calderon	Episodes: "Love in the Time of Hydra", "One Door Closes"
2015–2018	12 Monkeys	Jose Ramse	Main role (seasons 1–3); Recurring role (season 4), 31 episodes
2017	Kingdom	Dominick Ramos	Recurring role (Season 3), 8 episodes
2017	Law & Order: Special Victims Unit	Det. Ray Lopez	Episodes: "American Dream", "Sanctuary"
2017–2019	Arrow	Ricardo Diaz / The Dragon	Recurring role (season 6); main role (season 7), 25 episodes
2022	The Offer	Special Agent Hale	Miniseries
2023	Star Trek: Picard	Krinn	Episode: "Imposters"
2024	Lioness	Gutierrez	Recurring role (Season 2)

=== Video games ===
Year	Title	Role
2007	The Darkness	Jackie Estacado

== Accolades ==
In 1999, Acevedo won an ALMA Award for his role in The Thin Red Line. He was nominated in the "Outstanding Featured Actor in a Play" category in 1997 for the Drama Desk Award for Tooth of Crime. He was nominated for a total of four ALMA Awards for his role in Oz for the following years 1997, 1998, 2000, and 2001. He co-founded the theater company, The Rorschach Group, with Shea Whigham.

== See also ==
- List of Puerto Ricans
