= Unearthed (Fringe) =

- Fringe episode
- Episode no.: Season 2 Episode 11
- Directed by: Frederick E. O. Toye
- Written by: David H. Goodman; Andrew Kreisberg
- Production code: 3T7670
- Original air date: January 11, 2010

Guest appearances
- Alice Kremelberg as Lisa Donovan; Amy Carlson as Maureen Donovan; Annie Parisse as Teresa Rusk; Scott William Winters as Josh Selleg; Sean Dugan as Priest; Chazz Menendez as Andrew Rusk; Demetrius Cornell as EMT; Mark Dobies as Will Turlough; Tibor Feldman as Dr. Halperin

Episode chronology
← Previous "Grey Matters"	Next → "Johari Window"
- Fringe season 2

"Unearthed" is a bonus special standalone episode released during the second season of the American science fiction drama television series Fringe. While it serves as the 31st released episode of the series, it was produced during the first season and is recognized by Fox as the 21st episode of Fringe overall. Despite this, it does not fit into the series' continuity nor is it recognized as the season finale; it was released later due to an accounting error.

The episode features a reappearance of Kirk Acevedo as Charlie Francis, whose character was already killed off in the second season premiere. However, Acevedo's character was still alive in the series' continuity when the episode was produced.

While the body of a young, recently deceased girl is being harvested of its organs, she suddenly comes back to life yelling classified naval launch codes and Russian phrases, leading the Fringe Division to a recently murdered naval officer. The episode was written by co-executive producers David H. Goodman and Andrew Kreisberg, and was directed by producer Frederick E. O. Toye.

Though the episode was produced at the end of the first season, "Unearthed" first aired during the second season, on January 11, 2010, in a one-time timeslot. An estimated 7.79 million viewers tuned into the episode, giving it a "whopping" ratings improvement over its best ratings of the season. It was included in the second season's DVD release as a special feature. The episode was almost unanimously disliked by critics, with one reviewer calling it "a stinker that should have remained safely out of public view." Numerous critics also disliked guest actress Alice Kremelberg's performance, particularly when her character becomes possessed by a male ghost.

== Plot ==
A seventeen-year-old girl, Lisa Donovan (Alice Kremelberg), is declared brain dead at a hospital and is pulled off life support. While the doctors remove her organs for donation, she suddenly comes back from the dead and yells highly classified naval missile codes. Fringe Division arrives to investigate, along with a naval officer; he tells them the codes are tied to a missing sailor called Andrew Rusk (Chazz Menendez). Lisa is unaware of the numbers or Rusk, but suddenly starts speaking Russian while Olivia (Anna Torv), Peter (Joshua Jackson), and Walter (John Noble) question her. The naval officer informs them that Rusk is fluent in the language.

Olivia asks Lisa's mother Maureen (Amy Carlson) for permission to run more tests on the girl as a means to find Rusk, but Maureen disagrees. Meanwhile, Lisa has a vision of Rusk standing behind her, which leads Maureen to conclude they should end the investigation, as it is causing Lisa to experience these strange occurrences. Walter posits that Lisa's aneurysm tied her to Rusk and gave them a psychic bond. Having continued to suffer visions, Lisa soon calls Olivia and leads her to Rusk's body. It is determined that at the same time Lisa was taken off life support, Rusk was murdered. Walter believes that part of Rusk's consciousness transferred over to Lisa. Walter clashes with the family's priest (Sean Dugan) over her resurrection. Olivia learns that Rusk had recently experienced high levels of radiation; Walter posits that, due to this heavy radiation exposure, Rusk's energy is not completely "expended".

Lisa is transferred to Walter's lab, where he gives her special drugs to extract Rusk's thoughts from her mind. Instead, Rusk gains control of Lisa's body and demands to know where he is. His description of the murderer allows Charlie Francis (Note: The episode was filmed during season one's production but not aired until after Charlie had been killed off in season two.) to identify and pursue another naval officer. This other officer tells them Rusk's physically abused wife Teresa (Annie Parisse) hired him for the murder. Believing that he has left her mind, they learn too late that Rusk is still in control of Lisa; he goes to exact revenge on Teresa, but is stopped by Charlie shooting him with a tranquilizer dart. Lisa is eventually able to purge Rusk from her consciousness. The final scene shows an unrelated car crash victim suddenly waking up, mumbling in Russian: "My Star", the pet name Rusk called his wife, meaning that Rusk is back.

== Production ==
Co-executive producers David H. Goodman and Andrew Kreisberg wrote "Unearthed", while producer Frederick E. O. Toye worked as the episode director. "Unearthed" was the last episode filmed during the first season schedule. Although it was filmed during the first season, "Unearthed" aired during the following season on Monday, January 11, 2010, a departure from its normal timeslot on Thursdays. Actor Joshua Jackson explained the move in April 2009, "[It's] for boring reasons. They only had 22 airdates for our show this year, but they ordered 23 episodes, so we shot one for next year, which is just silly TV network stuff. It's not for any cool reason like we had something we needed in New York that we couldn't shoot elsewhere. It's just an accounting issue." That same month, executive producer/showrunner Jeff Pinkner further commented on the episode chronology for the new season, "It won't be the first episode, and it probably won't be the second, but it'll be somewhere in the first batch of episodes. It's a stand-alone, but it still honors the condition that we know it will fall into the world."

Fox issued a press release on January 11 previewing the episode's plot. It concluded, "While the girl's mind-bending condition intensifies, Walter dusts off some old lab videos and hypothesizes the unthinkable, sending Olivia and Peter to investigate the bewildering case in an original 'Unearthed' episode of Fringe and here's another mystery: is it an unaired episode from Season One or is it from an alternate universe?" As the press release purposely alluded to whether the episode was indeed originally part of the first season or from a different parallel universe, one critic wrote that "FOX [was just] having fun with the fact that Fringe has alternate universes" and that readers of the press release should "take this with a grain of salt". According to Fox's media site, "Unearthed" was listed as the 21st episode of season one, despite its broadcast during the second season and inclusion in that season's DVD release as a special feature. Though one character had been killed off earlier in the second season, a former series regular appeared in the episode, sparking confusion among some viewers. As the broadcasting change went unexplained at the time, one media outlet speculated it was a marketing ploy on the network's part, believing the episode title was "more than a stunning coincidence" and that it was a reference to co-creator J. J. Abrams' other television series, Lost.

== Reception ==
=== Ratings ===
On its initial broadcast in the United States, "Unearthed" was watched by an estimated 7.79 million viewers, earning a 2.8/7 share among viewers aged 18–49. The episode aired on a Monday night, which was a departure from its usual timeslot on Thursdays. This led it temporarily into direct competition with another science fiction series, Heroes; Fringe easily won, as Heroes had its lowest rated airing in the show's history while, according to SFScope's Sarah Stegall, "Unearthed" gave Fringe a "whopping 24 percent improvement over its best ratings this season."

=== Reviews ===
Critical reception to the episode was generally negative. The A.V. Club's Noel Murray graded the episode with a C−, explaining he didn't want to watch a season one cast-off, and that some of the episode moments were "generic[ally] embarrassing", such as when Olivia tricked someone into telling her Rusk was sick and when Rusk failed to kill his wife after falling into the "old Fallacy Of The Talking Killer" cliche. New York's Tim Grierson thought it was "the lamest in recent memory" and "a stinker that should have remained safely out of public view". He did however remark that the episode allowed him to see how far the show had improved since its first season. In a slightly more positive review, MTV's Josh Wigler wrote "As far as standard installments of Fringe go, 'Unearthed' ranks somewhere in the middle of the pack, but the quality diminishes due to its awkward placement in the middle of season two". IGN's Ramsey Isler rated the episode 6.4/10, commenting that it was "cheesy, with mediocre writing and some fairly bad performances from the guest supporting cast". Isler found little to redeem the episode, and wished the story's partial focus on the intersection of science and faith had been further explored.

"This episode was briskly paced and had a few charming and/or nostalgic moments, but it was mostly generic procedural stuff with a minimum of Fringe-ready freakiness."

— The A.V. Club writer Noel Murray

Andrew Hanson from the Los Angeles Times thought the "premise was a little thinly stretched over the hour" and believed it would have been overshadowed by stronger episodes in season one, but was glad to have another hour of Fringe regardless. SFScope contributor Sarah Stegall disliked that the network failed to issue a "disclaimer" about the episode's production date, stating "...maybe the producers assume that all their audiences are brand new to the franchise. Or perhaps, unhappily, it is a sign that Fox has given up on this show, and no longer cares whether its lingering audience is confused." She concluded, "As a standalone episode, this one was of middling interest, and I can see why Fox would have dropped it from the Season One lineup. Fans looking eagerly for more 'mythology' episodes, where the links between the Fringe team, Massive Dynamics [sic], Nina Sharpe, William Bell and, for all I know, the Illuminati are explored, may be disappointed." Jane Boursaw of AOL TV was also critical of Fox for giving no warning about the episode and thought it should actually have been titled 'Walter vs. The Priest.'" She continued, "The whole episode was an interesting intersect between science and faith, not to mention the whole 'being possessed by a dead person because your brain waves crossed during life and death' thing. You can tell it was vintage Fringe -- if indeed it was -- because the storylines are more complex than that these days, what with the alternate universe and Leonard Nimoy and all." Various critics noted guest actress Alice Kremelberg's performance, particularly when she had to give the impression she was possessed by a male ghost; most reviews were negative, though Boursaw praised it, giving Kremelberg "high fives".
