= Alice Kremelberg =

American actress

- Kremelberg in 2024
- Born: Long Island, New York, U.S.
- Education: Fordham University
- Occupation: Actress
- Years active: 2006–present

Alice Kremelberg is an American actress and writer. On television, she is known for her roles in the USA Network series The Sinner (2021) and the Disney+ series Renegade Nell (2024). Her films include The Trial of the Chicago 7 (2020).

== Early life and education ==
Kremelberg was born and raised on Long Island, New York. She attended the Professional Performing Arts School in Manhattan for high school before going on to study at Fordham University, the Atlantic Acting School's Conservatory, and with the Upright Citizens Brigade.

== Career ==
While still in high school, Kremelberg made her television debut in 2006 with roles in an episode of Law & Order: Special Victims Unit on NBC and as a young version of Crystal Chappell's character Olivia Spencer in the CBS soap opera Guiding Light.

Kremelberg guest starred in the 2010 Fringe special episode "Unearthed" on Fox. She had her first named film role in the 2012 drama Nancy, Please. In 2013, she played Reese in The Michael J. Fox Show on NBC. She had her first starring film role as Izzy in the 2015 science fiction film Campus Code. She then played Sorrell in Sonja O'Hara's Shudder series Doomsday.

In 2018 and 2019, Kremelberg had a recurring role as Nicole Eckelcamp in the fifth and sixth seasons of the Netflix series Orange is the New Black. She received a Daytime Emmy Award nomination for her performance in the web series The Feels, on which she also has writing credits. She wrote and produced the short film O, Ryan.

Kremelberg portrayed Bernardine in Aaron Sorkin's 2020 film The Trial of the Chicago 7 Also in 2020, she guest starred in an installment of the Hulu horror anthology Monsterland. Kremelberg joined the main cast of the USA Network series The Sinner as Percy Muldoon for its fourth and final season, which aired in 2021. She also played a young version of Caroline Williams' character in the film Ten Minutes to Midnight.

Kremelberg stars as Sofia Wilmot in the British Disney+ series Renegade Nell.

Kremelberg plays Anneliese Shaw in the 2026 Netflix series The Boroughs.

== Personal life ==
As of September 2019, Kremelberg is openly queer. She splits her time between New York, Los Angeles, and London.

== Filmography ==
=== Film ===
| Year | Title | Role | Notes |
|---|---|---|---|
| 2008 | Baby Mama | Rob's Daughter | |
| 2009 | The Taking of Pelham 123 | George's Girlfriend | |
| 2012 | Nancy, Please | Margaret | |
| 2014 | Beach Pillows | Alex | |
| 2015 | Campus Code | Izzy | |
| 2015 | Sweet Hollow | Emily | Short film |
| 2016 | Bowline | Lana | Short film |
| 2016 | Us | Helen | Short film |
| 2017 | Stronger Together | Lauren | Short film |
| 2017 | Duress | Adrienne | Short film |
| 2018 | Two Minute Kenneth! | Cindy | Short film |
| 2018 | Can You Ever Forgive Me? | Server | |
| 2018 | Ask for Jane | Young Woman | |
| 2018 | Love is Dead! | Cindy | |
| 2019 | O, Ryan | Mora | Short film; writer, producer |
| 2019 | Watch Room | Chloe | Short film |
| 2020 | Ten Minutes to Midnight | Young Amy | |
| 2020 | The Trial of the Chicago 7 | Bernardine Dohrn | |
| 2020 | Bury Me in Armor | Sarah | Short film |
| 2021 | Generation Wrecks | Jess | |
| 2022 | She Came from the Woods | Amy Marlowe | Voice |

=== Television ===
| Year | Title | Role | Notes |
|---|---|---|---|
| 2006 | Law & Order: Special Victims Unit | Julie | Episode: "Choreographed" |
| 2006 | Guiding Light | Young Olivia Spencer | 5 episodes |
| 2007 | 30 Rock | Margaret | Episode: "The Fighting Irish" |
| 2010 | Fringe | Lisa Donovan | Episode: "Unearthed" |
| 2010 | Blue Bloods | Alyson Duvitz | Episode: "Smack Attack" |
| 2011 | Nurse Jackie | Jenny | Episode: "The Astonishing" |
| 2011 | The Big C | Ruby | Episode: "Musical Chairs" |
| 2013 | Smash | Actor | Episode: "The Song" |
| 2013 | The Michael J. Fox Show | Reese | 3 episodes |
| 2018–2019 | Orange is the New Black | Nicole Eckelcamp | 11 episodes (seasons 5–7) |
| 2018 | NCIS: New Orleans | Arlene | Episode: "In the Blood" |
| 2019 | New Amsterdam | Wendy Birdwell | Episode: "The Forsaken" |
| 2020 | Monsterland | Abby | Episode: "Iron River, Michigan" |
| 2021 | The Sinner | Percy Muldoon | Main role (season 4) |
| 2023 | Quantum Leap | Rachel | Episode: "Family Style," "One Night in Koreatown" |
| 2024 | Renegade Nell | Sofia Wilmot | Main role |
| 2026 | The Boroughs | Anneliese | Main Role |

=== Web ===
| Year | Title | Role | Notes |
|---|---|---|---|
| 2015 | Working On It | Michelle | 2 episodes |
| 2016–2017 | Doomsday | Sorrell | 4 episodes |
| 2018 | The Elevator | Felicity | Episode: "The Kid"; writer |
| 2019 | The Feels | Kat | 3 episodes; writer |
| 2020 | Murder in Spacetown | Sharon Tweedles | Voice role; 1 episode |

== Stage ==
| Year | Title | Role | Venue(s) | Notes | Ref. |
|---|---|---|---|---|---|
| 2014 | Dry Land | Reba | HERE Arts Center, New York | | |
| 2016 | Dress of Fire | Cassandra | Dorothy Strelsin Theater, New York | | |
| 2016 | A Fancy Christmas Spectacular | | The Secret Theatre, New York | | |
| 2025 | Dry Land | Reba | Newman Mills Theater, New York | Main role; one-off benefit reading | |
| 2026 | Camping | Brit | HERE Arts Center, New York | | |

== Awards and nominations ==
| Year | Award | Category | Work | Result | Ref. |
|---|---|---|---|---|---|
| 2015 | Los Angeles Film Awards | Best Web Series | Working On It | Won | |
| 2016 | Brooklyn Web Fest | Best Actress | Doomsday | Nominated | |
| 2020 | Daytime Creative Arts Emmy Awards | Outstanding Limited Performance in a Daytime Program | The Feels | Nominated | |
| 2020 | Gotham Awards | Ensemble Tribute | The Trial of the Chicago 7 | Won | |
