= Hotel Attraction =

Skyscraper proposal

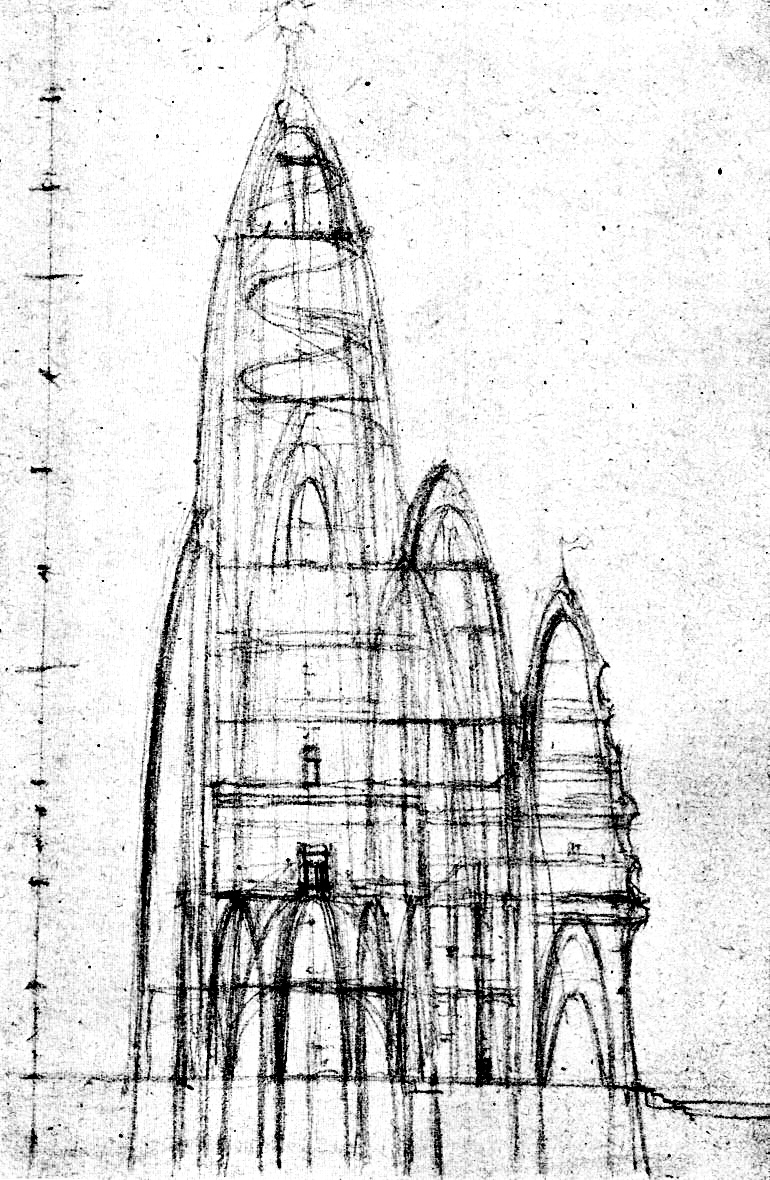
- Sketch by Gaudí of Hotel Attraction

General information
- Status: Proposed
- Type: Hotel
- Location: Lower Manhattan, New York City, New York
- Coordinates: 40.7115°N 74.0133°W

Height
- Antenna spire: 1,180 ft (360 m)

Technical details
- Floor count: 11

Design and construction
- Architect: Antoni Gaudí

Hotel Attraction was a proposal by architect Antoni Gaudí for a skyscraper in Lower Manhattan, New York City.

== History ==
Commissioned in May 1908, it would have been 1,180 feet (360 m) tall; many believed its futuristic design to be unrealistic for its time. Little is known about its origin, and the project remained unknown until 1956, when a report by Joan Matamala i Flotats was published, called "When the New World called Gaudí".

The drawings for the Attraction Hotel were proposed as a basis for the rebuilding of Ground Zero in Manhattan. A modified version of the drawings by Paul Laffoley earned broad media attention. The architect planned to feature a memorial at its base and the Sphere for Plaza Fountain as center of an observation platform at the top of the hotel.

== Fiction ==
The hotel was featured in the Fox Broadcasting television show Fringe. It was featured in the New York City skyline in the alternate universe.

== See also ==
- List of Gaudí buildings
