= Brown Betty (Fringe) =

- Fringe episode
- As part of Walter's tale, Olivia confronts the fictional version of himself, while a polka-dotted Gene the cow watches in the background
- Episode no.: Season 2 Episode 20
- Directed by: Seith Mann
- Written by: Jeff Pinkner; J. H. Wyman; Akiva Goldsman
- Production code: 3X5119
- Original air date: April 29, 2010

Guest appearances
- Michael Cerveris as the Observer; Ari Graynor as Rachel Dunham; Lily Pilblad as Ella Dunham; Ryan McDonald as Brandon

Episode chronology
← Previous "The Man from the Other Side"	Next → "Northwest Passage"
- Fringe season 2

"Brown Betty" is the 20th episode of the second season of the American science fiction drama television series Fringe, the 40th overall episode of the series, and is the only one of the series performed as a musical. The episode was written by co-showrunners Jeff Pinkner and J. H. Wyman, and consulting producer Akiva Goldsman. It was directed by filmmaker Seith Mann. As the episode begins with Peter's continued disappearance, Walter consoles himself by smoking a strain of marijuana called "Brown Betty." Most of the episode is then told from his drug-addled perspective, in which Olivia is a 1940s noir detective and Peter is a conman who ran away with Walter's glass heart.

The episode first aired in the United States on April 29, 2010 on the Fox Broadcasting Company and was seen by 5.551 million viewers in the United States. The episode was part of the network's "Fox Rocks" campaign, in which musical elements were incorporated into various shows in their lineup for a week, a concept that was panned by critics before the episode aired. Nevertheless, "Brown Betty" garnered mostly favorable reviews, with many noting the musical element as a strong point. Various cast members also stated that they enjoyed the musical aspect of the episode. It was ranked the fourth best episode of the entire series by Entertainment Weekly.

== Plot ==
Dr. Walter Bishop (John Noble) smokes his own strain of marijuana, "Brown Betty", while Olivia Dunham (Anna Torv) attempts to find his son, Peter (Joshua Jackson), who disappeared at the end of the previous episode after learning Walter stole him from a parallel universe. Because Dunham's sister Rachel (Ari Graynor) is unavailable, she brings her niece Ella (Lily Pilblad) to the lab for Walter and Astrid Farnsworth (Jasika Nicole) to look after. To pass the time, Walter tells Ella a detective noir story in which Olivia is a private investigator.

In the story, Rachel approaches Olivia to find her boyfriend, Peter, who has gone missing. During the investigation, Detective Phillip Broyles (Lance Reddick) leads her to Massive Dynamic, where the CEO Nina Sharp (Blair Brown) informs her that Peter is a conman and industrial spy. Later, Rachel is found murdered, with her heart taken. Olivia finds a check signed by Walter Bishop, who in the story, is an inventor that has created "everything that is wonderful in the world" in order to benefit humanity (hugs, rainbows, bubblegum, singing corpses). Questioning Walter, Olivia learns that Peter worked with Walter, who treated him like a son. One day, Walter made a glass heart but Peter later stole it. Were the heart not to be found, Walter and his ideas would die. To help find Peter, Olivia calls her assistant, "Esther Figglesworth" (Farnsworth).

Later, Olivia follows Nina Sharp, only to find herself kidnapped by a "watcher" (the Observer, played by Michael Cerveris) working for Sharp. The watcher attempts to kill Olivia by placing her in a wooden crate and sending it out to sea. Fortunately, Olivia is rescued by Peter. After taking her to his hideout, he reveals that the glass heart was his by nature of having been born with it, and that after working with Walter, Peter loved him enough to donate it to him. However, he took it back after learning a terrible secret behind his inventions: they were stolen from children's dreams and replaced with nightmares. Later, the house is under attack by an army of watchers. Olivia fights them off, but not before they manage to take Peter's heart with them. After placing batteries in his heart cavity to act as a temporary measure, Olivia discovers that Walter set up the attack. In the confrontation, Walter apologises for his misdeeds and promises to change. However, Peter does not forgive Walter and leaves him, ending the story.

Ella is disappointed by the ending, as that is not how she believes stories ought to end, so she proposes an alternate ending: when Walter says he can change, Peter believes him and splits the glass heart in two, and together they "lived happily ever after." At the episode's end, Olivia returns, having found no leads on Peter's location. Farnsworth returns Walter to his home, where the Observer watches from a distance and notes Peter's disappearance.

== Production ==
"Early in the season, we were graced with being on the cover of Entertainment Weekly. They had Olivia and Peter sort of as '40s detectives noir look. We knew we wanted to tell a sort of Princess Bride type story where Walter was relaying a story. As soon as we saw that cover, we said, 'Oh, it has to be a detective story,' because one of the themes of our show is it's not quite a procedural but Olivia's a detective and in some ways Peter is the person. The show already lends itself to that sort of vibe and so we wanted to leap in wholeheartedly. We took care in the episode to not make it 100% 40s noir. There're a lot of anachronistic things in it, which is sort of the aesthetic of the show anyway. But, it was really fun. The actors get to play different versions of their characters, which was really fun for them, and it just sort of presented different version of the show, which stands on its own".

— Jeff Pinkner

The episode was originally called "Overture", but was later changed to "Brown Betty" as a reference to Walter's marijuana habit. It was written by executive producers Jeff Pinkner and J. H. Wyman along with consulting producer Akiva Goldsman. Seith Mann served as the director, his only directional credit for the series. For Sweeps Week, the Fox network announced the "Fox Rocks" campaign, in which various shows within their lineup were encouraged to produce musical episodes in the same vein as the sophomore show Glee. Along with Fringe, Family Guy, Bones, The Simpsons, and a few other Fox series took up the musical theme. The episode was already in development before Fox's announcement. Jeff Pinkner stated that the music was not in the original plan for the episode, but was added to fit into Fox's sweeps stunt. As the episode occurred after the big reveal of Peter's true identity ("The Man from the Other Side"), the writers knew they wanted "Brown Betty" to explore the aftermath from Walter's damaged psyche. Fox did not ask for a full-blown musical, but requested that some music be integrated into the episode in any shape or form. Pinkner elaborated:

"We came up with a narrative device to really explore Walter's feelings. We had largely all the elements of the episode in place and Fox called and said, 'Hey, how would you guys feel about if we asked you to have some musical element in the show? Anything, like just feature a song playing.' They didn't ask us to do Glee. And we instantly, before we got off the phone, said, 'Well, this is what we're thinking for the episode and here's an idea how that could work for us.' We turned their request into what felt like a positive for us and really deepened and sort of blew the episode out even further in the direction we were already taking it".

The episode begins with Walter smoking his own strain of marijuana while listening to "Roundabout" by the band Yes. The scene was originally removed out of concern it would be airing on network television, but was later reinserted because "the story itself had so many different genres playing. We had a noir element. We had a musical element. and it just really played funnier coming from an altered state of Walter", according to co-producer Tanya Swerling. Jeff Pinkner added "We set out to do an episode that explored Walter's state of mind — he's dealing with some very upsetting news. When we realized that the way Walter would deal with such news would be to try to anesthetize himself with copious amounts of marijuana, well, singing and dancing became a natural outcome." Music supervisor Charles Scott IV and J.R. Wyman are big Yes fans, and consequently chose the song that appeared in the opening scene. As the episode was done with a 1940s aesthetic, every department had to act accordingly. Torv's normally straight hair was placed into a curl hairdo fashionable for the time period, and lighting changes were made to reflect the period as well. New furniture was brought in for various sets, such as Walter's lab and Nina's office at Massive Dynamic, which was then removed in preparation for the following week. The ending was a challenge for the producers, as it was supposed to end with Ella's version of the story conclusion and Walter still feeling upset over Peter's absence, but they felt this ended making viewers feel depressed. They debated ways to make it a happier tone, so Wyman added the Observer scene to change the feeling of the episode, and prepare viewers for next week.

As guest actor Leonard Nimoy, who plays William Bell, was unavailable to shoot the brief conversation with Blair Brown's Nina Sharp, the producers knew they wanted to do something a little more creative for the scene. They talked to cartoonist Frank Miller and hired a special effects school to do all the modeling, which they accomplished based on photos of Nimoy, because the actor could not come in to have his head scanned; he did some voicework however. The finished scene included an animated version of Nimoy's head, shown through the same window as the one used in "Peter".

Pinkner thought the added musical element improved the episode, because it gave insights into each of the characters' psyches. According to Wyman and Pinkner, the "episode was supposed to be a fantastical episode in the first place, and so the music supports the storytelling". Wyman continued in a different interview with the Los Angeles Times that "Noirs traditionally are morality tales, and that's kind of what we're doing. We felt that that was a great way to get across Walter's mind frame and where his head is at right now, with his son missing". Other cast members also praised the added music. John Noble wrote "It really deepened and blew the episode out even further in the direction we were already taking. We get [Walter's] fractured take on the world and his condition now that Peter has left. The music really supports the storytelling". He added, "It is like a mind-trip of Walter's. It is Walter trying to grapple with the fact that his son is gone". Jasika Nicole continued: "I have a musical theater background, so I've been waiting for some moment in some realm of where I am in TV and film for this to happen and, you know, of course, when Glee came on the air I was like, 'Great, that was my chance,' and I'm in this show, which I love this show, but I'm never going to sing and dance in this show. And I did! It's so awesome!" Swerling called it "the longest and possibly most difficult episode of the season" to create.

As with other Fringe episodes, Fox released a science lesson plan for grade school children focusing on the science seen in "Brown Betty", with the intention of having "students learn about fingerprints and how they can be collected and used as evidence to identify an individual."

=== Music ===
The co-music supervisor, Billy Gottlieb, called the episode a "little mini feature film in the sense that we had a lot of camera performances with the music." In order to get the best performances out of the cast and be able to shoot the scenes in various different ways, the producers had the actors go into a music studio in Vancouver and record their respective musical numbers. According to Gottlieb, the actors were very nervous about singing in the episode, despite their parts being around a mere 40 seconds. Actor Joshua Jackson, who plays Peter Bishop, was adamant that he not sing in the episode, despite the fact he frequently sings on set, causing him to be one of the few cast members with no musical part. As the original script contained no musical number for Jasika Nicole, she emailed Jeff Pinkner specifically asking him to let her sing, which he then approved. Some critics noted their surprise that Tony Award-winning actor Michael Cerveris did not sing in the episode. The producers were initially going to have him sing Django Reinhardt's "Blue Moon", but changed their minds because they thought it would be better to keep the Observer out of the musical aspect of the episode. Despite the pre-recordings, the audio used in the episode was taken from the actors actually singing on set. Tanya Swerling believed the recordings were not a wasted effort however, as it helped make the actors more comfortable about singing on set. At the end of shooting, Gottlieb believed "everybody was great... they could jump on stage and do Broadway and it wouldn't be a problem for any of them". He and other crew members called Jasika Nicole "probably the most accomplished" musical person of the cast. As one of the episode writers, Akiva Goldsman chose the Stevie Wonder song "For Once in My Life".

On composing the episode's score, Chris Tilton cited Chinatown as a big influence, and commented "the idea was to have this noir feel but still not be totally away from Fringe".

The episode featured excerpted music from the following tracks:

1. Yes' "Roundabout", heard in background
2. Tears for Fears' "Head over Heels", also sung by Walter and lip-synched by Rachel
3. Traffic's "Low Spark of High Heeled Boys", played on piano and sung by Broyles
4. A Chorus Line's "I Hope I Get It", sung by Astrid
5. Willy Wonka & the Chocolate Factory's "The Candy Man", sung by the singing corpses and later by Walter
6. Miles Davis' "Freddie Freeloader", played at the Peter house
7. Stevie Wonder's "For Once in My Life", sung by Olivia
8. Ella Fitzgerald's "Blue Moon", heard in background and also danced by Peter and Olivia

== Reception ==
=== Ratings ===
"Brown Betty" was watched by 5.551 million viewers in the United States, with a 3.4 share out 5 among all households and a 2.0/6 share of the audience aged 18–49. The episode fell five percent from the previous week.

=== Reviews ===
The episode premiered to generally positive reviews. Although initially cringing over the musical premise, Ramsey Isler of IGN called the episode "admittedly fun" because it "gave us an indirect window to view how Walter feels about himself". In a review of the DVD, Chris Carle, also of IGN, later called it the "worst overall episode" of the season however, asking the question "Musical numbers and Olivia Dunham: who thought this would be a good idea?" Ken Tucker of Entertainment Weekly was also initially irritated after hearing Fox's musical plans, and consequently gave "Fringe a lot of credit for pulling off this hour so cleverly" Jennifer Walker from TV Fanatic thought the episode was "bizarre" to watch; it "held our interest for the entire 60 minutes, but really failed to introduce any new information about Peter and the unknown man that has crossed into our dimension". MTV's John Wigler loved the "noir" element, and thought "each and every participating "Fringe" cast member exhibited great musical ability. Overall, it was a very solid effort on everyone's part". Jane Boursaw of TV Squad loved the scenes between Walter and Ella, and thought "it was downright brilliant to create a story within a story". While he praised the episode's production and the singing abilities of the cast, Kurt Anthony Krug of Mania.com wrote a negative review: "All in all, what was supposed to be a fun filler episode before the question of where Peter went at the end of the last episode when he found out he was the Peter from an alternate reality – one of the turning points in the show’s mythology – fell flat". Sarah Stegall of SFScope enjoyed it, writing "There was just enough music, and just enough dance, to season this story without overburdening it". She praised the risktaking it took to make the episode "edgy and whimsical, casting aside the concrete conventions of television storytelling...Not only was it entertaining, but it moved the storyline forward on some important emotional fronts, as the characters deal with Peter's disappearance in ways that protect them, but reveal as well".

Andrew Hanson from the Los Angeles Times also was impressed with the cast's singing abilities, and praised the writers' risk-taking: "that just goes to show how well thought out, creative, and just plain fun tonight’s “Fringe” really was. A lot of people would have pegged a 1940s film noir musical episode as a big risk, but the bigger the risk, the bigger the pay out". Rhee Dee of Pinkraygun.com commented "After the revelation in the last episode, and Peter running away, this episode was a great way to express Walter’s grief and guilt about this whole situation without actually watching Walter talk about how sad and guilty he feels about everything. Walter’s story serves as a powerful metaphor for how he actually feels". Tim Grierson of New York Magazine thought the episode turned out to be simply mediocre because "its noir elements weren’t incorporated in a really interesting way, and as for the musical numbers, they tended to be throwaway bits, save for “fictional” Dunham crooning “For Once in My Life” to the seemingly dying “fictional” Peter near the episode’s end". Grierson continued that "If a show is going to completely throw away its usual rulebook for a fun onetime-only episode, it would be great if the writers could come up with a story as audacious as their premise. But aside from some Chinatown references, fancy threads, and mildly clever mirroring of the show’s mythology — Massive Dynamic is up to no good in this story-land world as well — 'Brown Betty' wasn’t all that enjoyable because it didn’t do a great job of capturing what generally makes Fringe enjoyable".

Noel Murray of The A.V. Club graded the episode an A-, while Television Without Pity gave it a C+. Jeff Jensen of Entertainment Weekly named it the fourth best episode of the series, explaining "The late season lark that officially launched a tradition for similar stunts, the musical film noir homage 'Brown Betty'... was an offbeat gem that expressed all of Fringe's core themes — redemption, connection, rehumanization — and encapsulated the key relationships (the slow-moving Walter-Peter reconciliation; Peter and Olivia's carefully tended soul-deep romance) more poignantly than most on-point episodes of Fringe, and it left fans wanting the show to keep pushing the innovation. It could never do it enough." In a similar list, Den of Geek named it the ninth best episode of the series, explaining that "it shouldn’t work, and yet it does, because although technically nothing happens, the episode shows us just how deep Walter has sunk into a metaphorical pit of despair and guilt, making himself the villain in his own story and despairing of ever being forgiven. It also gives the audience a refreshing break from some of the high level angst of the end of the season, allowing Peter and Olivia to act out a properly romantic storyline while their characters in the ‘real’ world have been torn apart. Also, there are singing corpses in it. Only on Fringe."

=== Awards and nominations ===
"Brown Betty," along with Music Editor Paul Apelgren, was nominated for Best Sound Editing: TV Short Form Music in a Musical by the Motion Picture Sound Editors for the 2011 Golden Reel Awards. "The Box", a season three Fringe episode, was also nominated for Best Sound Editing: TV Short Form Music. "Brown Betty" lost to an episode of Glee.
