= Fringe season 1 =

Season of American television series

Fringe
- Season 1
- Region 1 DVD cover
- No. of episodes: 20

Release
- Original network: Fox
- Original release: September 9, 2008 – May 12, 2009

Season chronology
- Next → Season 2

The first season of the American science fiction television series Fringe commenced airing on the Fox network on September 9, 2008, and concluded on May 12, 2009. It was produced by Bad Robot in association with Warner Bros. Television, and its showrunners were Jeff Pinkner and J. H. Wyman. The first season introduces a Federal Bureau of Investigation "Fringe Division" team based in Boston, Massachusetts under the supervision of Homeland Security. The team uses unorthodox "fringe" science and FBI investigative techniques to investigate a series of unexplained, often ghastly occurrences, which are related to mysteries surrounding a parallel universe. FBI agent Olivia Dunham is portrayed by actress Anna Torv, while actors Joshua Jackson and John Noble play father-son duo Peter and Walter Bishop. Other regular cast members include Lance Reddick, Jasika Nicole, Blair Brown, Mark Valley, and Kirk Acevedo.

The season produced 21 episodes, although only 20 of them aired as part of the first season. The unaired episode, "Unearthed", was broadcast as part of the second season as episode 11 as a special episode.

== Cast ==
=== Main cast ===
- Anna Torv as Olivia Dunham
- Joshua Jackson as Peter Bishop
- Lance Reddick as Phillip Broyles
- Kirk Acevedo as Charlie Francis
- Blair Brown as Nina Sharp
- Jasika Nicole as Astrid Farnsworth
- Mark Valley as John Scott
- John Noble as Dr. Walter Bishop

=== Recurring cast ===
- Michael Cerveris as September/The Observer
- Ari Graynor as Rachel Dunham
- Lily Pilblad as Ella Blake
- Chance Kelly as Mitchell Loeb
- Michael Gaston as Sanford Harris
- Jared Harris as David Robert Jones
- Trini Alvarado as Samantha Loeb
- Clark Middleton as Edward Markham
- David Call as Nick Lane

=== Guest stars ===
Episodic guest stars included: Billy Burke, Derek Cecil, Jennifer Ferrin, James Frain, Jason Butler Harner, Neal Huff, Gillian Jacobs, Michael Kelly, Randall Duk Kim, Spencer List, Jefferson Mays, Susan Misner, Ebon Moss-Bachrach, Keith Nobbs, Zak Orth, Peter Outerbridge, Al Sapienza, Felix Solis, Kenneth Tigar, Yul Vazquez, and Kiersten Warren. Leonard Nimoy first appears as Dr. William Bell in an uncredited, voice-only role in the season finale.

== Season summary ==
The first season of Fringe begins with the introduction of the main characters, as Olivia is brought aboard the Fringe division following the critical injury of her partner, John Scott, in an event tied to the Fringe division. As part of her investigation, she finds she needs the knowledge and experience of Walter Bishop, currently institutionalized in a mental hospital. Olivia blackmails Walter's estranged son, Peter, to be Walter's legal guardian, allowing his release from the institution. Olivia finds that Walter's knowledge in the area of fringe science to be critical for her job, and convinces Peter to remain as Walter's guardian; Peter, initially resentful due to events in his childhood, starts to participate directly in the cases, his abilities as a jack-of-all-trades being a benefit to both Walter's scientific needs and Olivia's investigations. Walter himself struggles with life outside the institution, plagued by a secret from his past and often resorting to recreational drugs. Olivia comes to discover that Massive Dynamic, a company that Walter used to be a part of, is connected with several of the Fringe cases.

The Fringe team starts to learn of a bio-terrorist group known as ZFT (in German, Zerstörung durch Fortschritte der Technologie, translated as "Destruction by Advancement of Technology"), which seem to be after several of Walter's old experiments. In one case, a group of men led by Mitchell Loeb have recreated Walter's technology used to pass through solid matter to steal several components of a device, constructed by Walter, from banks. With the assembled device, Loeb's team is able to teleport David Robert Jones, a former Massive Dynamics employee and leader of the ZFT, out of a high security prison. Jones attempts to sway Olivia to his side as a "soldier" in an upcoming "war," making her aware that she, as a child, was part of a test run by Walter and his partner William Bell of the nootropic drug, Cortexiphan, that gave her psychokinetic powers. Olivia refuses, disbelieving his claim but realizing that evidence to support it appears true. Meanwhile, the Observer meets with Walter and takes him to Walter's old beach house, where he finds a device he once made that can close a portal to a parallel universe. Tracking Jones, Olivia finds that all of the Fringe events have formed a spiral, centering on Reiden Lake in New York, and she, Peter, and Walter are able to prevent Jones from crossing over to a parallel universe using the device that Walter found, killing Jones in the process. Later Walter is seen at a cemetery where he mourns over a grave labeled "Peter Bishop."

Olivia tries to get answers from Nina Sharp on Jones' motive, but she only directs her to a meeting with Bell. Olivia, while en route to the meeting, finds herself in the parallel universe, in the World Trade Center office of William Bell.

== Episodes ==
No. overall	No. in season	Title	Directed by	Written by	Original release date	Prod. code	US viewers (millions)
1	1	"Pilot"	Alex Graves	J. J. Abrams & Alex Kurtzman & Roberto Orci	September 9, 2008	276038	9.13
An international flight lands at Boston's Logan Airport, its crew and passengers dead from a mysterious flesh-dissolving protein. When Special Agent Olivia Dunham's partner, John Scott, is critically injured by the precursor chemicals of the same toxin, she recruits Dr. Walter Bishop, a mentally unstable biochemist, and his estranged son, Peter, to help her save John's life. They discover a cure for John's condition, but learn that the chemical attack was but an experiment, and part of a larger mystery called "The Pattern." John is found to be responsible for funding the creation of the toxin, but is killed while trying to escape. At the end, John's body is delivered to Massive Dynamic to be questioned through a shared dreamscape.
2	2	"The Same Old Story"	Paul Edwards	Jeff Pinkner & J. J. Abrams & Alex Kurtzman & Roberto Orci	September 16, 2008	3T7651	13.27
Olivia, along with Peter and Walter Bishop, reopens a cold case involving a serial killer (Derek Cecil) who extracted the pituitary glands from his victims after investigating the strange death of a woman (Betty Gilpin) who had an even stranger child. The woman was pregnant for a few minutes, yet the baby she birthed was fully developed - then aged eighty years in the span of another few minutes. They discover that the killer is an artificially aged human, who is using the hormones extracted from the removed glands to halt his accelerated aging disease. The team is able to track him and his creator (Mark Blum) down, causing the man to die from being deprived of the hormones keeping him young.
3	3	"The Ghost Network"	Frederick E. O. Toye	David H. Goodman & J. R. Orci	September 23, 2008	3T7652	9.42
A man, Roy McComb (Zak Orth), seems to be having visions of Pattern-related terror attacks before they occur. The team, led by Dr. Bishop, discovers that he is receiving signals from the Ghost Network, an otherwise undetectable frequency range on which the masterminds are communicating. Among the attacks is a collapse of the Birmingham Bridge in Pittsburgh. With his help, they are able to intercept a strange crystalline disk, which is given to Nina Sharp for analysis.
4	4	"The Arrival"	Paul Edwards	J. J. Abrams & Jeff Pinkner	September 30, 2008	3T7653	9.91
A mysterious cylinder emerges from beneath the Earth in New York City, so Broyles enlists the trio of Olivia, Dr. Bishop and Peter to investigate it. However, others also seek it, including the Observer (Michael Cerveris), a man who only watches events as they unfold, and another willing to kill to retrieve the cylinder. Dr. Bishop hides the cylinder against the wishes of the rest of the team, owing a debt to the Observer for saving his life and that of his son years earlier. An unknown man abducts and tortures Peter for information regarding the cylinder's location, and learns its placement through the ideas Peter has absorbed from his father through osmosis. The man takes him to a cemetery housing a tombstone bearing the name of Robert Bishop and finds the cylinder. Olivia shows up after learning the location from Walter and kills the man. The object burrows back underground before either side can discover its purpose. Peter encounters the Observer, who demonstrates telepathic abilities before shooting Peter with a yet unknown weapon. Standing in the kitchen, Olivia later sees John Scott in the entrance.
5	5	"Power Hungry"	Christopher Misiano	Jason Cahill & Julia Cho	October 14, 2008	3T7654	9.16
The team discovers a man, Joseph Meegar (Ebon Moss-Bachrach), with the uncontrolled ability to affect electrical energy, made the way he is by a scientist performing illegal experiments on humans. With the help of carrier pigeons modified to track the man's electromagnetic signature, the team manages to track him down and arrest the scientist. Meanwhile, Olivia begins seeing visions of John, which she learns are caused by memories transferred to her during their experience in the first episode. Through these memories, she discovers one of John's secret hideouts, where a large number of investigation files relating to the Pattern are found.
6	6	"The Cure"	Bill Eagles	Felicia D. Henderson & Brad Caleb Kane	October 21, 2008	3T7655	8.91
A woman (Maria Dizzia) with a lupus like autoimmune disease known as "Bellini's lymphocemia" is kidnapped and given a drug that makes her brain emit a multi-gigawatt RF burst, cooking her and the patrons of a diner she stumbles into to death. When the team investigates, they find that another woman (Marjan Neshat) with the same rare disease has been kidnapped. After talking to the doctor who was treating them, Olivia learns that the chief scientist of a competitor of Massive Dynamic is the one who gave her the drug. Peter makes a deal with Nina Sharp, who tells him where to find the second victim before she can be turned into a terrorist weapon.
7	7	"In Which We Meet Mr. Jones"	Brad Anderson	J. J. Abrams & Jeff Pinkner	November 11, 2008	3T7656	8.61
Agent Mitchell Loeb (Chance Kelly), a friend of Broyles collapses on assignment, his heart being constricted by a rhizocephalan like parasite which is slowly working its roots into his circulatory system. To find a cure, Olivia must talk to Dr. David Robert Jones (Jared Harris), a biochemist held incommunicado in Frankfurt, Germany. Problems arise when Jones demands to speak to a colleague of his in exchange, who is unfortunately killed in a raid set up by Broyles. Walter, however, devises a way to wire Peter into the dead man's brain, enabling Peter to speak on his behalf. The procedure is successful and the parasite is removed, but the team doesn't realize that the entire incident was orchestrated by Loeb to get the information Peter extracted from the dead man.
8	8	"The Equation"	Gwyneth Horder-Payton	J. R. Orci & David H. Goodman	November 18, 2008	3T7657	9.18
The abduction of a young musician, Ben Stockton (Charlie Tahan), is highlighted by a sequence of flashing lights which causes the boy's father to be hypnotized into a suggestive state. Upon 'waking up,' he has no memory of what happened while hypnotized. Similar cases have ended with the victim being returned, but left insane from the trauma of the incident. While investigating, they discover that each case dealt with a genius of some sort working on an unfinished equation. To discover the child's whereabouts, Olivia encourages Walter to return to St. Claire's Hospital and speak with his old bunkmate, Dashiell Kim (Randall Duk Kim) a former mathematician who disappeared under similar circumstances. The visit does not go well, and Walter is held by the hospital administrator, who remains unconvinced of Walter's sanity. Walter coerces his bunk mate into giving up a vague idea of his whereabouts, which Olivia and Peter use to find the boy once they arrange for Walter's release. However, the kidnapper, Joanne Ostler (Gillian Jacobs), escapes with the completed formula, which she gives to Mitchell Loeb (Chance Kelly), who calibrates a frequency generator in such a way to allow him to pass through solid matter.
9	9	"The Dreamscape"	Frederick E. O. Toye	Zack Whedon & Julia Cho	November 25, 2008	3T7658	7.70
A Massive Dynamic employee, Mark Young (Ptolemy Slocum), jumps out of a window when he believes he is being attacked by butterflies. Olivia's connection with John Scott leads her to breaks in the case, but she becomes fed up with his manifestations and decides to return to the sensory deprivation tank to rid herself of them. Meanwhile, Peter's past catches up with him when his enemies find out he's back in Boston. Walter discovers that a hallucinogen produced by frogs is being used to literally scare victims to death, and the frogs are tracked to a suspect, George Morales (Yul Vazquez) with whom John was involved. Morales points to Massive Dynamic as the real culprit and tries to make a deal to testify, but is himself poisoned with the compound before this happens.
10	10	"Safe"	Michael Zinberg	David H. Goodman & Jason Cahill	December 2, 2008	3T7659	8.54
Agent Dunham investigates a body trapped inside a wall in a bank. He turns out to be a member of Mitchell Loeb's team, who uses the technology he obtained in "The Equation" to engineer a string of bank robberies, targeting safe deposit boxes Walter used to hide a teleportation device. He succeeds in recovering the device and uses it to teleport David Robert Jones (Jared Harris) right out of a prison in Germany. Furthermore, Massive Dynamic's plan to resurrect John Scott is halted when they realize a crucial piece of his memories is inside Dunham's mind, after Olivia discovers she is mistaking his memories for hers. Jones instructs his partners to retrieve Olivia, and she is abducted while trying to track Loeb's group.
11	11	"Bound"	Frederick E. O. Toye	J. J. Abrams & Jeff Pinkner & Alex Kurtzman & Roberto Orci	January 20, 2009	3T7660	11.96
Olivia's former adversary, Sanford Harris (Michael Gaston), conducts a formal review of the Fringe Division. Olivia manages to free herself from her abductors. She, along with Walter and Peter, investigates the murder of an epidemiologist, who is killed by a man-made rhinovirus that creates a giant, slug-like single cell in his stomach. Olivia succeeds in connecting the murder to Loeb and obtains the necessary evidence to capture him. Olivia tries to question him about her abduction but he tells her that he was trying to save her. Olivia's sister Rachel (Ari Graynor) pays a visit with daughter Ella.
12	12	"The No-Brainer"	John Polson	David H. Goodman & Brad Caleb Kane	January 27, 2009	3T7661	11.62
The trio investigates the deaths of a teenager and a car salesman whose brains have been liquefied after watching a video sent to their computers. All of the victims are connected to a computer programmer (Chris Bauer) who has lost his job. The murderer then sends the video to Olivia's laptop, almost killing her niece Ella, before Olivia is able to intervene. In order to catch the suspect, Olivia defies an order from Agent Harris, and Broyles puts his friendship with Harris on the line to defend her.
13	13	"The Transformation"	Brad Anderson	Zack Whedon & J. R. Orci	February 3, 2009	3T7662	12.78
When a plane crashes after a passenger transforms into a monster, the team suspects a possible smuggling of bioterror weapons, which is linked with John Scott. They also find a crystalline disk, similar to one seen inside the woman killed in "The Ghost Network," in the passenger's and his accomplice's body. While solving the case, Olivia learns that John Scott was working undercover for the National Security Agency and his body is being kept by Massive Dynamic for extracting more information. Following Olivia's successful operation to take down the weapons dealer, she returns to the sensory deprivation tank and bids farewell to John's consciousness, which has finally left her own.
14	14	"Ability"	Norberto Barba	Story by : Glen Whitman & Robert Chiappetta; Teleplay by : David H. Goodman	February 10, 2009	3T7663	9.83
Dr. David Robert Jones turns himself in to the FBI, having begun to suffer side effects of his teleportation. (Note: In the episode "Safe".) The side effects will do something terrible to Jones. As insurance, Jones developed an adhesive which causes the orifices of those exposed to it to seal up, suffocating them. A bomb containing the toxin will go off if Olivia cannot pass his tests. The first test is to shut off lights using only her mind. Jones says that this is possible due to a nootropic drug present in Olivia, one designed by William Bell and patented by Massive Dynamic. The team discovers a manuscript, which explains the letters ZFT (Zerstörung durch Fortschritte der Technologie), (Note: Translated in English to "Destruction by Advancement of Technology".) which is essentially a Bible to Jones and his followers. According to the manuscript, their world is in conflict with another universe. Jones wants Olivia as a "recruit" and the tests are a part of the selection process. When forced to disarm the bomb in the same manner as the test, Olivia succeeds. Jones is taken to a hospital for further observation. There, he eventually disappears leaving a hole in a wall. Later, Olivia gets confirmation from Nina Sharp that she was indeed injected with the chemical as a child. Walter realizes that the ZFT document was written with the lab's typewriter, indicating that either Walter or Bell was the author of the manifesto.
15	15	"Inner Child"	Frederick E. O. Toye	Brad Caleb Kane & Julia Cho	April 7, 2009	3T7664	9.88
An enigmatic mute child (Spencer List) is found living underground and begins to bond with Olivia when the Fringe Division is brought in to investigate. While the child adapts to his new environment, Olivia and the FBI hunt a bizarre serial killer known as "The Artist" (Jeremy Shamos), who has resurfaced to publicly display his work. The child leads Olivia to breaks in the case, using a strange ability to sense the emotions of the killer. Once the killer has been captured, Olivia arranges for the child to be secretly put in the care of a foster family, rather than turning him over to the CIA as ordered. As the boy is taken to his new home, he sees the Observer (who, like the child, is hairless and enigmatic) on the sidewalk staring at him.
16	16	"Unleashed"	Brad Anderson	Zack Whedon & J. R. Orci	April 14, 2009	3T7665	10.15
When animal rights activists ransack a laboratory, they accidentally release a man-made chimera with a ferocious appetite. Walter suspects that his research helped to create it. The creature leaves a trail of grotesquely mutilated bodies in its wake, some of which it injects with its larvae. Charlie survives such an encounter with the creature, and the Fringe Division must race to capture it for a sample of its blood before the larvae eat their way out of Charlie. Olivia discovers the source of the creature, and that it was created based on work by one of Walter's peers, not Walter himself. Walter risks his life to capture the creature and succeeds, allowing them to save Charlie.
17	17	"Bad Dreams"	Akiva Goldsman	Akiva Goldsman	April 21, 2009	3T7666	9.89
Olivia dreams of herself committing murders hundreds of miles away, and the team discovers that, while no one is actually causing the incidents, they are happening as Olivia has seen them. The team discovers that another person treated with the nootropic drug Cortexiphan, Olivia's "buddy" Nick Lane (David Call) in the drug trials, is unwittingly transmitting his intense emotions and causing others to act on them. While Olivia does not remember him, he remembers her, having nicknamed her "Olive." Olivia non-fatally wounds him so he does not commit suicide with a large group, and he is placed in a medically induced coma to contain his emotions. Walter watches a video of Olivia as a child, apparently taken during the time she was being administered the drug. Walter's voice is heard on the tape, as is William Bell's. Both are trying to calm Olivia down and there appears to be damage to the equipment in the room.
18	18	"Midnight"	Bobby Roth	J. H. Wyman & Andrew Kreisberg	April 28, 2009	3T7667	9.62
The investigation into the deaths of people whose bodies are drained of their spinal fluid leads the Fringe Division to a scientist named Nicholas Boone (Jefferson Mays) with ties to the bioterrorist cell ZFT. Boone's wife Valerie (Trieste Dunn) is the killer, having been infected with an extinct syphilis strain that drives her to consume her victims' spinal fluid. Her first victim onscreen is a suave clubgoer, Bob Dunn (Richard Short). In exchange for information on ZFT, Walter aids Boone in creating an antidote to cure Valerie. Boone has to use some of his already low amount of spinal fluid to formulate the antidote, costing him his life. Olivia and Peter successfully capture Valerie and cure her. A video made by Boone prior his death reveals that William Bell has been funding ZFT.
19	19	"The Road Not Taken"	Frederick E. O. Toye	Story by : Akiva Goldsman; Teleplay by : Jeff Pinkner & J. R. Orci	May 5, 2009	3T7668	9.25
The Fringe Division investigates the case of a woman (Jennifer Ferrin) who "spontaneously combusts" in a busy New York street. She is the subject of a ZFT experiment to cultivate pyrokinesis. During the investigation, Olivia experiences "visions" while awake. Walter suggests that she is seeing a parallel universe which has branched off from our own. Olivia and Peter visit an agoraphobic website designer (Clint Howard) who is apparently aware of William Bell, the drug trials, and the coming war, although his credibility comes into question when he believes himself to be a Star Trek character. Using information from her visions, Olivia tracks down the victim's twin sister, who moments before was kidnapped for more ZFT experimentation. Harris is actually responsible for the crimes, and while closing in on him, Olivia gets locked in a room with the twin sister, whose unstable pyrokinetic abilities threaten both their lives. With Olivia's guidance, the woman decides to focus her energy on Harris and incinerate him instead. The sisters were part of the same nootropic drug trial that Olivia was as a child. She presses Walter to reveal why he and William Bell were developing "supersoldiers," but Walter reveals only that it was for protection against some impending doom that he cannot recall. The ZFT manuscript was actually written by William Bell, and the copy of the manuscript ZFT uses is missing a chapter dealing with ethics. Walter locates the original, but the Observer appears and takes Walter away, stating: "It is time to go." Nina Sharp visits Broyles to discuss the Observer. Later, two masked gunmen using silenced weapons shoot Nina in her hotel.
20	20	"There's More Than One of Everything"	Brad Anderson	Story by : Akiva Goldsman & Bryan Burk; Teleplay by : Jeff Pinkner & J. H. Wyman	May 12, 2009	3T7669	9.28
Nina recovers from her attack and reveals to the Fringe Division that Jones stole an energy cell from her mechanical arm; he intends to use it to open a doorway into a parallel universe to confront William Bell. Meanwhile, Peter finds Walter at a beach house where they retrieve a device that can seal the opening. Walter once lost something dear to him and had to retrieve it from another reality, the device being meant to prevent something from following him. Olivia, Peter and Walter intercept Jones opening another window, and Peter triggers Walter's device, killing Jones by sealing the doorway while only half of him is through it. Walter later goes alone to visit a graveyard and cries while observing a gravestone marked "Peter Bishop 1978-1985," suggesting that Walter's legitimate son died. Nina later calls Olivia and implies that she can meet William Bell in Manhattan. Olivia is transported to the parallel universe and is directed to an office. After reading a newspaper headline indicating that President Obama was preparing to move into the "new" White House, she is greeted by William Bell (Leonard Nimoy) and inquires where she is. They turn out to be standing inside the South Tower of the World Trade Center.

== Development ==
While we make sure that our episodes are self-contained – have a beginning, a middle, and an end – the character stories can be serialized. They don't have to resolve themselves over the course of one show.

— Co-creator Alex Kurtzman

Co-creators J. J. Abrams, Alex Kurtzman, and Roberto Orci began the brainstorming process for Fringe in the spring of 2008. They avoided emulating Abrams' other show, Lost, because they believed its mysteries made it difficult to attract new viewers. Instead, the co-creators studied crime procedurals, such as the American series CSI: Crime Scene Investigation and the franchise Law & Order, in an attempt to merge that genre with a more mythology-based show without creating only standalone episodes. Orci explained, "We studied procedurals specifically to try and merge the two. Very against our instincts to do that, but when nine of the top TV shows are called Law & Order and CSI, you have to study them a little bit and figure out what it is that they're doing." Abrams has also listed the science fiction television series The Twilight Zone, Altered States, and The X-Files as well as the 1979 film Alien as inspirations for Fringe.

Jeff Pinkner, an executive producer on two of Abrams' other television series Lost and Alias, was hired to serve as showrunner and executive producer for Fringe. He described Fringe as being concerned with "primal fear", as "our bodies and our minds are, at the end of the day, unknowable. The ways our bodies betray us can be terrifying."

Critics as well as those involved in the show's production have acknowledged that Fringe had a rocky beginning. Abrams later noted, "It's going to sound weird, but a show starts talking to you and telling you what it wants to be. It took us a while to hear it." The series struggled early on, as the first ten episodes had continuous rewrites and expensive last-minute reshoots. Actor Lance Reddick noted "It was a constant struggle. It just didn't feel like a signature [J.J. Abrams] show — not yet." Pinkner has also acknowledged that early episodes were often too neatly wrapped and solved. "We found that, absolutely, early on, we were falling into the trap of—the tease would be fantastic. And then we would too quickly answer it and [reduce] the tension," he said. "And we've tried to course-correct and have the tease promise" questions that don't get answered right away.

The writers began to focus more attention on the series' mythology when Akiva Goldsman temporarily joined Fringe to write and direct a mid-season episode, "Bad Dreams." Believing "this is the stuff fans want to know", he and Bryan Burk were able to convince the other series writers to begin revealing the concept of parallel universes, despite the writers' initial intention to merely tease the idea of two worlds over two seasons. They also attempted to make Olivia's personal life more relatable by ending her storyline with John Scott and giving her a sister and niece. Abrams noted that Olivia was evolving from a "guarded, protective woman" who did not have strong relationships with others to someone more vulnerable; the presence of Olivia's sister, he noted, helped give the character "at least opportunities to be warmer to someone." By the middle of the season, critics and regular viewers noted Fringe had started to improve. Kevin Reilly observed around this time, "I was looking for evidence that it was becoming their favorite show. And it was during the back half of the season that people started to say, 'This is now appointment television for me."

== Reception ==
=== Ratings ===
Fringe finished its first season with an average of 8.8 million viewers per episode, making it the most watched new series for the 18–49 demographic. In Canada on CTV, Fringe's first season had an episode average of 1.3 million viewers and finished in 19th place.

=== Reviews ===
On Rotten Tomatoes, the season has an approval rating of 84% with an average score of 7.5 out of 10 based on 25 reviews. The website's critical consensus reads, "Action-packed, suspenseful, and filled with intriguing twists, Fringe is a smart sci-fi series that's compelling enough to overcome its occasionally uneven plotting." Metacritic, a review aggregate website, gave the first season 67/100 based upon 25 critical reviews, indicating a "generally favorable" reception. While the series was perceived to have a shaky start, the season finale aired to general fan acclaim.

== Home video releases ==
The first season of Fringe was released on DVD and Blu-ray in region 1 on September 8, 2009, in region 2 on September 28, 2009 and in region 4 on September 30, 2009. The sets includes all 20 episodes of season one on a 7-disc DVD set and a 5-disc Blu-ray set presented in anamorphic widescreen. Special features on the sets include three commentary tracks—"Pilot" with co-creators J. J. Abrams, Alex Kurtzman and Roberto Orci, "The Ghost Network" with writers J. R. Orci, David H. Goodman and executive producer Bryan Burk, and "Bad Dreams" with writer/director Akiva Goldsman and executive producer Jeff Pinkner. Episodic behind-the-scene featurettes include "Deciphering the Scene" on every episode and "The Massive Undertaking" on select episodes. Also included on select episodes are "Dissected Files", deleted scenes. The main featurettes include "Evolution: The Genesis of Fringe", "The Casting of Fringe", "The Real Science Behind Fringe" and "Fringe Visual Effects". Also included is "Roberto Orci's Production Diary", a short featurette titled "Gene the Cow" and a gag reel. Exclusive to the Blu-ray version is "Fringe Pattern Analysis".
