= There's More Than One of Everything =

- Fringe episode
- Episode no.: Season 1 Episode 20
- Directed by: Brad Anderson
- Story by: Akiva Goldsman; Bryan Burk
- Teleplay by: Jeff Pinkner; J. H. Wyman
- Production code: 3T7669
- Original air date: May 12, 2009
- Running time: 47 minutes

Guest appearances
- Michael Cerveris as The Observer; Jared Harris as David Robert Jones; Leonard Nimoy as William Bell

Episode chronology
← Previous "The Road Not Taken"	Next → "A New Day in the Old Town"
- Fringe season 1

"There's More Than One of Everything" is the finale of the first season of the American science fiction drama television series Fringe. The finale followed David Robert Jones' (Jared Harris) attempts to open a doorway to the parallel universe, while the Fringe team tries to stop him. It ends with FBI agent Olivia Dunham (Anna Torv) discovering a startling secret about Massive Dynamic founder William Bell (Leonard Nimoy).

The episode's story was co-written by Akiva Goldsman and Bryan Burk, and the teleplay was co-written by Jeff Pinkner and J. H. Wyman, while Brad Anderson directed. The episode marked the first appearance of guest actor Nimoy as William Bell. Co-creator J. J. Abrams, having worked with Nimoy on the 2009 film Star Trek, begged the actor to join the series through a series of phone conversations. Nimoy signed on for three episodes and found playing the character to be a "unique experience" after so many years portraying Spock.

The episode first aired on May 12, 2009, in the United States and was watched by an estimated 9.28 million viewers. "There's More Than One of Everything" received mostly good reviews, with many critics praising the revelations concerning the parallel universe. Many critics offered opinions on the depiction of the Twin Towers, with most reactions being positive.

== Plot ==
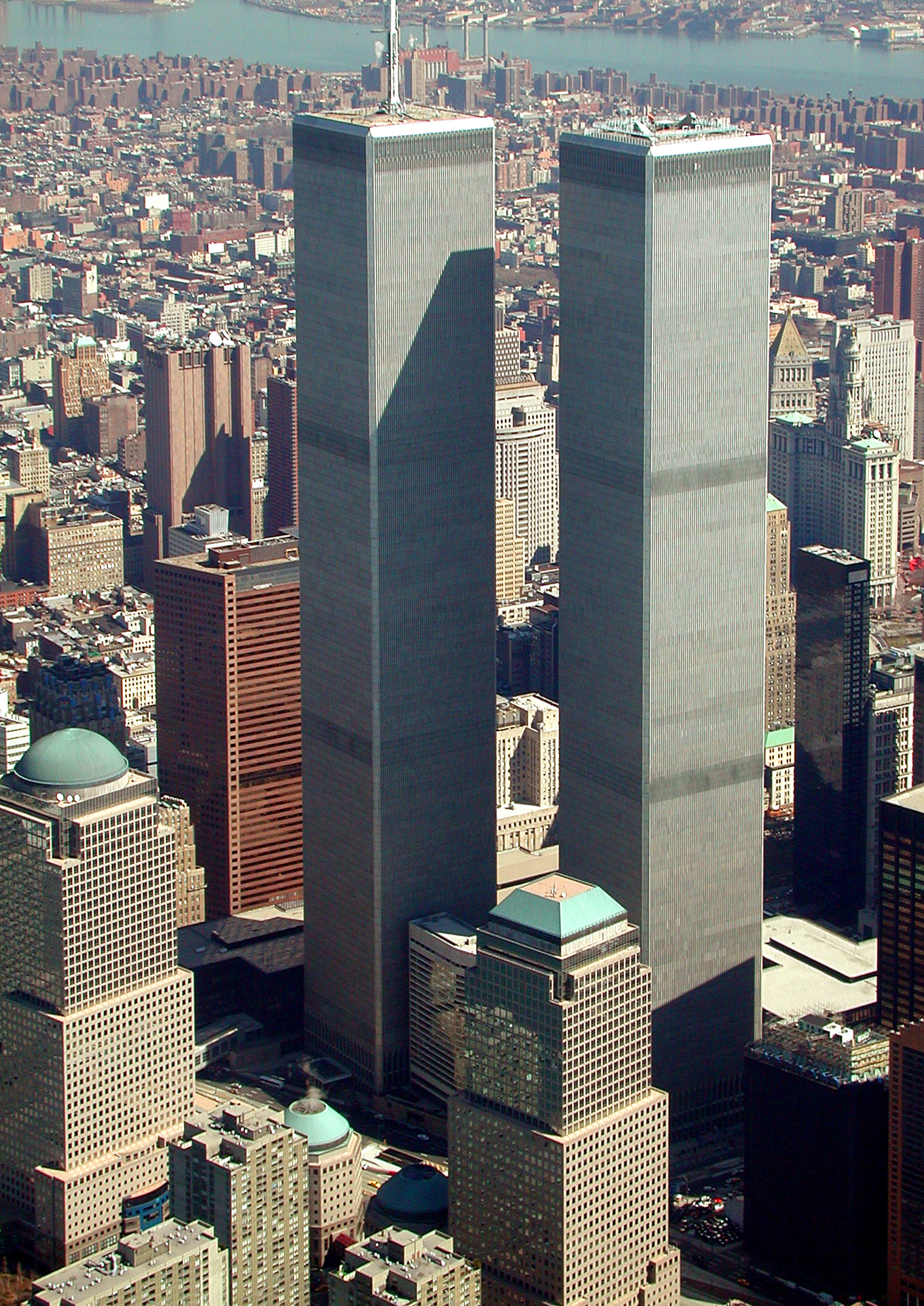
The concluding shot of the episode, a pull-back to reveal the still-standing World Trade Center in the parallel universe, was considered an iconic shot of the series, and one that the cast has stated that they have never "had a better visual or a better cliff-hanger".

While Nina Sharp (Blair Brown) recovers from the gunshot sustained in the previous episode, (Note: Nina Sharp had taken precaution of having body-armor implanted under the skin of her torso.) the Fringe team's investigation reveals that the man in white bandages is David Robert Jones (Jared Harris). Olivia Dunham (Anna Torv) and Phillip Broyles (Lance Reddick) discuss locating William Bell for questioning, who they believe is behind all the fringe events that have been occurring all season.

Meanwhile, Walter Bishop (John Noble) is at a graveyard, where he solemnly stares at an unknown gravestone. Olivia, Peter Bishop (Joshua Jackson), and Astrid Farnsworth (Jasika Nicole) begin searching for Walter. Nina tells Olivia that an energy cell was stolen from her mechanical arm by Jones, and that he was formerly a Massive Dynamic employee who had looked up to Bell as a "father figure" until they had a falling-out. When Olivia demands to speak to Bell, Nina explains that she does not know where he is, as Bell has been communicating these past few months "strictly electronically". Nina believes Jones is trying to confront Bell, and promises Olivia that if she stops Jones, Nina will arrange a meeting between her and Bell.

On a busy New York City street, Jones and his team use the energy cell to open a doorway into a parallel universe and bring a truck through, but are apparently unsuccessful, as Jones complains he used the "wrong coordinates". Having previously observed Walter at the graveyard, The Observer (Michael Cerveris) arrives with Walter at the Bishops' beach house, and gives Walter a coin, telling him to remember what he has to find. Walter goes on alone into the house, while Olivia and Charlie interview witnesses who saw Jones extract the truck from the doorway. They discover that the truck's VIN numbers do not exist, which implies the "truck was never made". A further interview with Nina reveals to the Fringe team that the truck is from another universe, and that Jones is using the stolen energy cell to travel to that universe.

Peter finds Walter and chooses to meet his father alone, as he believes Walter is upset from the past several days. Now at the beach house, Peter and Walter search for and retrieve a device that can seal shut the doorway into the other universe. Walter explains to Peter that he once lost something very dear to him and that he had to go and bring it back from another reality; the device was created to prevent something from following him.

After Jones makes another unsuccessful attempt to open a doorway at a soccer field in Providence, Olivia searches through old case files related to science and unexplained phenomena, and discovers a geographic connection between the soccer field, the city street, and several of their past Fringe cases. Olivia and Walter come to the same conclusion, that Jones is going to use a site at Reiden Lake to reopen the doorway, the epicenter of these Fringe events. Olivia, Peter, and Walter intercept Jones while he is opening another window and is halfway through it. Peter triggers Walter's device, killing Jones by sealing the doorway.

At the end of the episode, Walter again goes alone to visit the graveyard; he tearfully observes a gravestone marked "Peter Bishop 1978–1985", suggesting that Walter's legitimate son died. Nina Sharp later calls Olivia and implies to her that she can meet William Bell in Manhattan. On the way to the hotel she almost gets into a car crash, at which point she is transported to the parallel universe. After no one shows up at the hotel restaurant, Olivia leaves, as she assumes that she got stood up. However, when in an elevator to leave the building, Olivia is teleported to another location and is directed to an office. After reading a newspaper headline indicating that President Obama was preparing to move into the "new" White House, she is greeted by William Bell (Leonard Nimoy) and inquires where she is. The final shot pans out the window revealing that they are standing inside the South Tower of the World Trade Center.

== Production ==
=== Casting ===
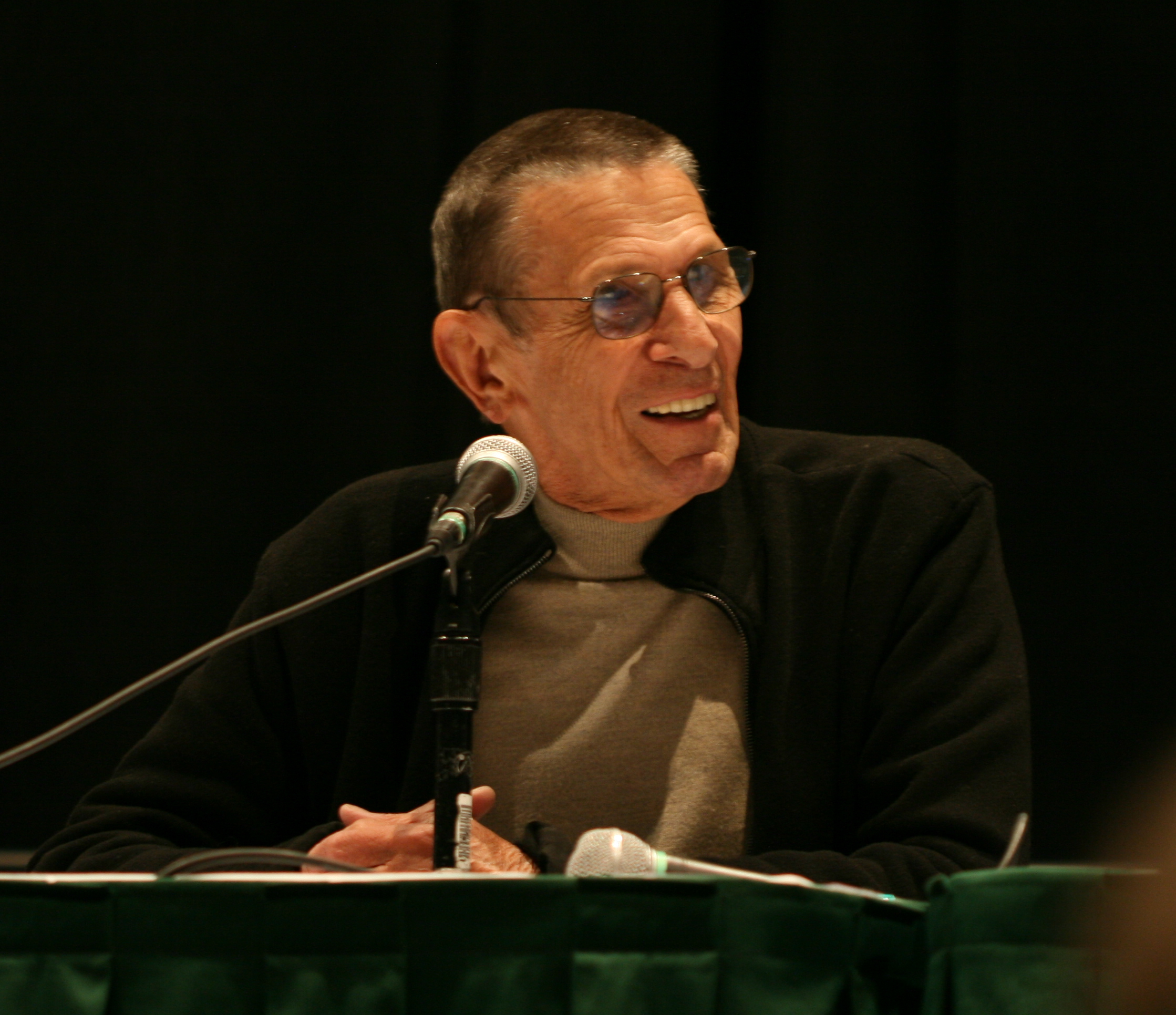
Guest actor Leonard Nimoy said Fringe would be his final acting project. He described his character William Bell as "somewhat [of] a blank slate and therefore attractive, because there is an opportunity to build an interesting and unpredictable character".

The character of Massive Dynamic founder William Bell was originally meant to be revealed earlier in the first season, but the writers changed their minds as the show progressed. In early April 2009, Entertainment Weekly announced that Star Trek actor Leonard Nimoy had been cast as Bell. He and Fringe co-creator J. J. Abrams already had a relationship after working together on the 2009 film Star Trek; Abrams stated in an interview that he called Nimoy and begged him to join Fringe, explaining the show and the character. Nimoy sounded interested but wanted to become more familiar with the show, so Abrams and the other producers sent him as much information as they could about Fringe, until Nimoy agreed. This exchange of phone calls, in which Nimoy responded with interest when pitched the idea, was also how Abrams was able to cast him in his Star Trek reboot. Nimoy later explained "When they contacted me about working on 'Fringe' – the same people, the same attitude, the same creativity, the same creative team – it was very enticing". According to Abrams, "The idea that he will play the mysterious, much-referenced William Bell is a thrill. I know I sound like a goofy fan boy, but I can’t help it: Leonard is an icon of the genre and such a wonderful actor. To have him come on board Fringe is a mind-blowing honor".

Nimoy was hired for three episodes, beginning with the season finale. Fringe co-creator Roberto Orci described Nimoy's character as "a mix of Howard Hughes and Bill Gates", while Nimoy referred to Bell as a "master of the universe" who is "brilliant, wealthy and very powerful". Nimoy's part of the final scene of the episode with Olivia was very brief. Nimoy described the scene as "interesting, entertaining" and "that you'll want to see more of this relationship and what it's all about". Actress Anna Torv described the final scene as calm yet threatening, "That's what's kind of cool about working on Fringe, is everything seems kind of calm and lovely, but there's always something going on underneath". While shooting, Nimoy commented that the character "was a unique experience," as he had not acted outside of the Spock character for a number of years. Nimoy stated in multiple interviews that his Fringe role would be the last project in his acting career.

=== Writing and filming ===
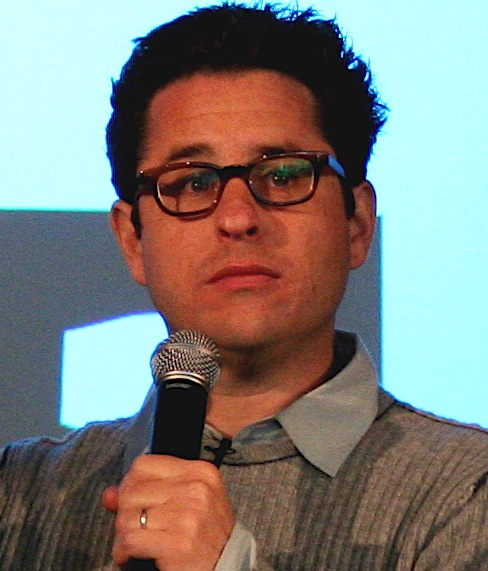
Co-creator J. J. Abrams called the finale "a huge turning point" for all three main characters.

The episode's teleplay was co-written by executive producers Jeff Pinkner and J. H. Wyman, while consulting producer Akiva Goldsman and executive producer Bryan Burk co-wrote the story. Producer Brad Anderson served as episode director, his fourth credit of the season. J. J. Abrams called the finale "the end of one chapter and the start of another", and believed it was "a huge turning point" for all three main characters.

Co-creator and executive producer Roberto Orci explained in an interview that the big reveal at the end of the episode, in which Olivia meets Bell in the parallel universe, was actually planned for a fourth season, but the writers decided "let's actually answer something instead and not get, not just rely on that mystery forever. And so we actually chose to give kind of a big answer and have to come with a different show than we ever intended". The writers wanted to use an iconic image for the scene, leading to staff writer Andrew Kreisberg's suggestion of the Twin Towers. Wyman first thought it was "the greatest idea in the world" before having doubts that its use would "sensationalize" it. He explained, "But then, when we started thinking about it, we thought collectively America really understood 9/11 is such a monumental moment so we felt it wasn’t exploited but indicative of the times we’re living in right now. We used it and that was the end of the first season and then we were all really thrilled with where it was going." The cast would later recollect on the series, and for Jackson, considered that the show has never "had a better visual or a better cliff-hanger" as this finale.

To create the scene where Jones brings a semi truck from the parallel universe, the special effects crew took a smaller truck and dressed it enough so that it seemed like the longer semi with the help of CGI; the result was that in the episode, the viewer is led to believe that the truck had been "cut" in half after unsuccessfully entering the prime universe doorway. It was rigged so that it appeared to be on a tilt, and cables linked it to smash into a passing car. As the production crew considered William Bell to be a "Renaissance man", they filled Bell's office with "things that inspire him," such as a prototype of Nina's mechanical arm and other items that "evoke images and stimulate thought".

== Cultural references ==
In the final scene set in the parallel universe, a newspaper states the (presumably recently inaugurated) Obamas are moving into the "new" White House, indicating that the traditional presidential residence had been recently rebuilt; this is later confirmed in season two, where it's told that the White House was targeted by terrorists instead of the Twin Towers. Another headline has former President John F. Kennedy addressing the United Nations. Another part of the newspaper depicts Boston Celtics player Len Bias winning the MVP award, when Bias in fact died in 1986 in the prime universe.

== Reception ==
=== Ratings ===
"There's More Than One of Everything" was season one's finale. The episode was watched by an estimated 9.28 million viewers in the United States.

In between the first two seasons, Fox aired repeats of the first season featuring Twitter comments about the episodes from executive producers Jeff Pinkner and J.H. Wyman, and actors John Noble and Joshua Jackson.

=== Reviews ===
The episode received generally positive reviews, with multiple critics lauding the performances of actors Anna Torv and John Noble. In his review for Entertainment Weekly, critic Ken Tucker wrote this his "mind was blown not once, but twice" due to the many revelations about two universes; Fringe "has vaulted to the upper reaches of current television". In a second review, Tucker praised the "beautifully, startlingly executed" special effects when the "hole" in the universe closed. Writing for The A.V. Club, critic Zach Handlen gave the episode an A, and felt the episode made him want to go back and rewatch season one because the finale had "so many references and back story nods that I wanted to have everything in my head together". Andrew Hanson from the Los Angeles Times thought the finale "leads to a wealth of possibilities... The déjà universe was a bold move. I can’t wait to see what our friends at Fringe do with it". Writing for the Chicago Tribune, critic Maureen Ryan heaped praise on the "excellent" episode, and complimented "the quietly creepy atmosphere, the slowly building tension in the dual Walter/Olivia stories, the way those stories were skillfully woven together, the suitably tense lakeside encounter between Olivia, Peter and Mr. Jones".

"This episode is the epitome of the unpredictable and remarkable first season for Fringe. It gave us lots of surprises, some missteps, a few answers, and a few new mysteries. And for good measure, it ended on a surprising and controversial image. The finale was an appropriate ending for this chapter of the series, and a great sign of what's to come"

— IGN reviewer Ramsey Isler

Though some critics appreciated how Fringe chose to end the finale with a shot of the World Trade Center, others disliked it. Jeff Pinkner defended their decision by explaining they chose it because the building is "obviously very iconic" and it best displayed that in the parallel universe, "things are both better and in some ways worse. It's just different choices, the road not taken". Leonard Nimoy also defended the writers, commenting that when he received the script, he thought it "was very interesting and really kind of daring contemporary television to pull in that story... You know, it's not easy to use that kind of stuff without seeming somehow exploitive. But I thought they did it very, very well". Many critics expressed that because of the episode, they couldn't wait for the following season to begin. IGN's Ramsey Isler rated the episode 9.2/10, while website blogger io9 listed "There's More Than One of Everything" as one of the "crucial" episodes new viewers must watch to get into the show.

The Futon Critic listed it the 16th best television episode of 2009, explaining "J. J. Abrams and company know all about big reveals... but this one, in which William Bell reveals himself as living in a parallel universe where the Twin Towers weren't lost, was one of their most indelible". In a comparison of "There's More Than One of Everything" and The X-Files episode "4-D", UGO Networks columnist Alex Zalben wrote that the Fringe episode won "by a landslide. This episode kicked the show into high gear, while '4-D' was The X-Files winding down." Jeff Jensen of Entertainment Weekly named "There's More Than One of Everything" the seventh best episode of the series, calling it "the episode that changed everything... With that, the most hyped show of the 2008–2009 TV season produced a moment that finally earned it buzz." Den of Geek ranked the episode as the fifth best of the entire series, while IGN ranked it the ninth best.

=== Awards and nominations ===
Bryan Burk, Akiva Goldsman, Jeff Pinkner, and J.H. Wyman submitted the episode for consideration in the Outstanding Writing for a Drama Series Category at the 61st Primetime Emmy Awards. They also submitted two other episodes, "Pilot" and "Bound", but did not receive any nominations.
