= Unleashed (Fringe) =

- Fringe episode
- Olivia arrives on the scene and discovers the chimera killed a man and wounded her partner.
- Episode no.: Season 1 Episode 16
- Directed by: Brad Anderson
- Written by: Zack Whedon; J. R. Orci
- Production code: 3T7665
- Original air date: April 14, 2009

Guest appearances
- Michael Cerveris as the Observer; Ari Graynor as Rachel Dunham; Lily Pilblad as Ella Blake; David Pittu as Robert Swift; Keith Nobbs as Carl Bussler; Kiersten Warren as Sonia Francis; Tim Gallin as Cameron Deglmann

Episode chronology
← Previous "Inner Child"	Next → "Bad Dreams"
- Fringe season 1

"Unleashed" is the 16th episode of the first season of the American science fiction drama television series Fringe. It centered on a man-made chimera, which escaped from an animal testing facility and attacked various people, including Agent Charlie Francis, while the Fringe team tries to stop it.

The episode was written by Zack Whedon and J. R. Orci, and directed by Brad Anderson. Actress Kiersten Warren guest-starred as Charlie's wife Sonia.

It first aired in the United States on the Fox Broadcasting Network on April 14, 2009, and more than 10 million viewers watched the episode. It received mixed reviews, with a common criticism being that the "monster-of-the-week" was becoming a tired idea for the show.

== Plot ==
Animal rights activists ransack a laboratory and unwittingly release a creature with a ferocious appetite. As they flee in an SUV, the creature follows and grotesquely mutilates them. The Fringe team consisting of FBI agents Olivia Dunham (Anna Torv), Charlie Francis (Kirk Acevedo), Philip Broyles (Lance Reddick), and civilian consultants Peter (Joshua Jackson) and Walter Bishop (John Noble) arrives, and Walter sees evidence of different creatures' marks on the bodies. Olivia realizes one of them is missing, and after interviewing a student at MIT to try to identify the victims, she realizes they were animal rights activists. While conducting autopsies on the bodies, an animal control team at a different site is killed by the creature after investigating a call.

While investigating the animal control team deaths, Charlie is attacked by the creature, but it fails to kill him after Olivia arrives on the scene. Walter explains he believes the creature is a man-made chimera, which has the best genetic traits of many different creatures, including a lizard, bat, and wasp. He had tried to create the creature years before, but his experiments failed, and concludes that someone else must have taken up his research. Though initially thinking Charlie was healthy after the attack, they realize the chimera's stinger injected him with its larvae, and that he has less than 24 hours to live.

After experimenting with poison fails to kill the larvae in Charlie's body, Walter believes that mixing the chimera's blood with Charlie's will stop the larvae from attacking and bursting out of his body, as they did in the other victims' corpses. Olivia learns one of the victims, Jonathan Swift, was the son of a scientist who tests on animals, and was killed while breaking into his father's lab. They also realize the chimera was created based on work by one of Walter's peers, not Walter himself.

After several sightings, the Fringe team move into some nearby storm drains to bait the chimera with its larvae. Feeling somewhat responsible, Walter locks himself in with the chimera and ingests some poison that will kill him within the hour, believing that if it kills him, the chimera will only be killing itself. He manages to shoot the chimera in time, however, and they use its blood to find a cure for Charlie.

== Production ==
"Unleashed" was directed by filmmaker Brad Anderson, his third episode of the season. It was co-written by writer Zack Whedon and supervising producer J. R. Orci.

The episode centered on Kirk Acevedo's character Charlie Francis. Acevedo explained in an interview, "Charlie goes out on this call, and he gets attacked by this mythological, genetically enhanced griffin. He fights for his life throughout the episode". Acevedo suggested that his wife, actress Kiersten Warren, play his character's wife Sonia, and the producers duly cast her. Acevedo explained his choice was because, "to create intimacy with someone who you don't know is actually not going to work. So to have your real wife do it, then you can be a lot better on screen".

The scene where Walter confronts the chimera was shot in a Boston sewer. He and Peter carry 50 caliber Desert Eagle handguns, called "monster killers" by one prop crew member. While shooting, the actors had to use their imagination, as the CGI monster was not yet complete. Director Brad Anderson described the chimera "sort of an amalgam of a bat, lion, and a dragon". Anderson called the scene between Walter and the chimera as a "triumphant moment" for Walter, and actor Joshua Jackson characterized the scene as Walter's "action hero moment". The actor himself, John Noble, described the scene with the chimera as "terrifying", as his character "tries to be a hero". Andrew Orloff, Zoic’s Creative Director and Visual Effects Supervisor later called the chimera effect the most difficult effect he'd done for the show thus far. Sound editor Thomas Harris explained that because the episode had a monster that was "part lizard, part wasp, part bat, and part lion," it was difficult to "manipulate sounds from all these animals, as well as other sweeteners, without getting muddy and meshing together". Their efforts on the episode were ultimately nominated in several categories at the Golden Reel Awards, and at the HPA Awards, for which they won.

Actress Jasika Nicole explained in a May 2009 interview that the scariest episode for her at the time was "Unleashed". She described the episode's production, "The props people had these big buckets of earth worms, but they were thicker and meatier and longer. They had teeny little bitty faces... So the guy's chest is cut open and he’s been in make-up for hours to make it look like he’s been torn open and he’s all bloody and stuff. So then they pour these worms and this goopy, syrupy stuff and this fake blood onto this guy’s chest... We had to zip him up in the body bag. It takes a few minutes to get to 'action' after he's zipped up. We unzip him and we see the worms and it’s so gross–and the look on his face. The worms are crawling up and their in his armpits and starting to crawl toward his face and he can’t move at all because he’s supposed to be dead." Nicole continued that this scene had to be shot "three or four times. We kept trying to get faster and faster but we were all laughing [for him]. It was like a Fear Factor episode with no chance of getting money... It was so gross but so much fun. The guy was such a trooper."

New Media consultant Glen Whitman stated in an interview that this particular episode contains some recent scientific developments that were part of their inspiration for the creation of Fringe in the first place. Specifically, Whitman is referring to the use of transgenics, which is the idea that there are organisms with genes from other species. Whitman concluded that they were partly inspired by scientists Osamu Shimomura, Martin Chalfie, and Roger Y. Tsien and their work on research on isolating genes from jellyfish for the treatment of Huntington's disease; all three won the 2008 Nobel Prize in Chemistry.

== Reception ==
=== Ratings ===
"Unleashed" was watched by more than 10.15 million viewers in the United States. It had a 5.9/9 share among all households.

=== Reviews ===
Ramsey Isler from IGN rated it 7.8/10, explaining the "mysterious escaped monster" is a tired idea that failed to bring anything new to the show, and the episode "lacked real suspense and intrigue". Isler however praised the further development of John Noble's character, as Walter took responsibility for his actions. Josie Kafka of Open Salon.com saw allusions in the episode to many other genres, including Buffy the Vampire Slayer, Halloween, and Dollhouse. She thought the "Walter-Peter interchanges" were the most interesting aspects of the episode. The A.V. Club's Noel Murray graded the episode a B-, writing that though he enjoyed the "thrilling, funny opening" and the "multiple amusing lines of dialogue," he wished the episode had gone further with the genetic experimentation concept. Murray concluded that "'Unleashed' stays at the level of a well-shot, disappointingly straightforward monster movie, with an everything’s-okay-now ending".

Sarah Stegall from SFScope was skeptical of the chimera premise, but wrote she was willing to overlook that because the episode "delivers [entertainment] in spades" and gives "a fine payoff... There are creepy sewers, pee jokes, heroics, tears, laughter, scares, and finally a kill shot of a terrifically scary monster". Stegall also praised Torv and Acevedo's performances, and called the episode the best she's watched in a while. Andrew Hanson from the Los Angeles Times praised the episode, writing the writers and characters were "finally getting into their groove," and that the monster sequence was "better than most horror films I’ve seen lately".

=== Awards and nominations ===
"Unleashed" was nominated for several awards. At the 2009 HPA Awards, the episode and its crew (Note: Sound editors Thomas Harris, Michael Ferdie, and Chris Reeves of Motion Picture Sound Editors, and re-recording mixers Mark Fleming and Tom Dahl of Walt Disney Studio Post Production Services, were all collectively nominated for the episode at the HPA Awards.) were nominated and ultimately won for Outstanding Audio Post — Television. Its competition was an episode of Lost and an episode of CSI: Crime Scene Investigation. At the 2010 Golden Reel Awards, the episode was nominated for two categories: Best Sound Editing: Short Form Dialogue and ADR in Television and Best Sound Editing: Short Form Sound Effects and Foley in Television. It lost in the first category to an episode of True Blood, and the second category award went to an episode of House.
