= Bad Dreams (Fringe) =

- Fringe episode
- A suicidal Nick Lane is influencing the thoughts of those around him to jump off the building, while Olivia tries to calm him down.
- Episode no.: Season 1 Episode 17
- Directed by: Akiva Goldsman
- Written by: Akiva Goldsman
- Production code: 3T7666
- Original air date: April 21, 2009

Guest appearances
- Ari Graynor as Rachel Dunham; David Call as Nick Lane; April Grace as Police Detective

Episode chronology
← Previous "Unleashed"	Next → "Midnight"
- Fringe season 1

"Bad Dreams" is the 17th episode of the first season of the American science fiction drama television series Fringe. It was written and directed by Academy Award-winning screenwriter Akiva Goldsman, his first writing credit for a television show. In the episode, Olivia dreams she is causing people to either kill others or themselves, which leads her to meet Nick Lane, a man from her past that leads Olivia to discover their shared history as test subjects in a series of childhood drug trials.

The episode first aired on April 21, 2009, in the United States on Fox to more than 9.89 million viewers. It received generally positive reviews, with many critics praising the beginning dream sequence, the climax atop the building, and the final scene with Walter and the old footage of Olivia. Critics also enjoyed the further revelations about Olivia's background; the subject would later have an entire episode devoted to it in the third season.

== Plot ==
Olivia (Anna Torv) dreams that she pushes a woman in front of a subway train at Grand Central Terminal, but assumes it was just in her head. In the morning however, the news reports that the woman killed herself with the train. Walter (John Noble) puts forth various theories, such as astral projection, while Peter (Joshua Jackson) thinks it was still just a dream. Olivia is unconvinced, and goes with the Fringe team to investigate. An NYPD officer (April Grace) escorts them to the crime scene, and Peter sees a red balloon floating and begins to believe her, as Olivia had described the balloon to him previously.

Olivia worries it will happen again, and though she attempts to ward off sleep, she next dreams that she helps a woman murder her husband at a restaurant. They interview the wife, who tells them she became so convinced her husband was going to leave her that she became angry and stabbed him. The team posits that while no one is actually causing the incidents, they are happening as Olivia has seen them. At the restaurant, the owner tells them a blond man with a scar named Nick Lane (David Call) was sitting in the same place as Olivia was in her dream, and was also seen in the video surveillance from the first crime scene. Walter posits that because she never sees him in her dreams, it was Lane, not Olivia, causing the people's deaths. Olivia and Peter interview doctors at St. Jude's Mental Hospital, who tell them Lane was a voluntary resident, but left after the visit of a mysterious man. The doctor described him as hyperemotive, meaning those near him adopt his emotions. Olivia and Peter soon learn that as a child, Lane was treated with the nootropic drug Cortexiphan in drug trials, and believes himself to be a recruit in the upcoming war between the two universes.

Walter tells Olivia that she may have been in the same drug trials as Lane, and that the bond they share stems from Walter and William Bell (Leonard Nimoy) pairing up the children in the "buddy system". To find Lane, Walter uses this bond, putting Olivia under the effect of drugs so she experiences Lane's emotions. She sees Lane sleep with a stripper, who then is influenced to kill herself in a mirror of Lane's depressed thoughts; afterwards, Olivia discovers where Lane lives. While they explore his apartment, a suicidal Lane walks down a sidewalk, influencing others to mirror his emotions, so that they follow him to the top of a building. Because of her past in the trials, Walter believes Olivia won't be influenced by these suicidal thoughts, and she goes to encounter Lane alone. While Olivia does not remember him, he remembers her and the nickname he gave her: "Olive." Olivia wounds him, breaking his mind-control over the others, and he is placed in a medically-induced longterm coma to control his emotions.

The episode ends with Walter watching a video of Olivia as a child, apparently taken while she was being administered Cortexiphan. Walter's voice is heard on the tape, as is William Bell's. Both are trying to calm little Olivia while she sits, huddled amidst a debris-strewn room of equipment. It becomes clear Olivia has caused this chaos in Walter and Bell's lab, presumably with her Cortexiphan-induced abilities.

== Production ==
The episode was written and directed by Academy Award-winning screenwriter Akiva Goldsman. Goldsman was "attracted" to the series because he believed that at the time, Fringe's "mythology was already really starting to hum". "Bad Dreams" was his first writing credit for a television episode, and he wrote several hours of material before co-executive producer Jeff Pinkner helped him condense it. Every episode since "Bad Dreams", Goldsman has been credited as a consulting producer. It marked the first episode with previous Fringe director Brad Anderson now also credited as a producer.

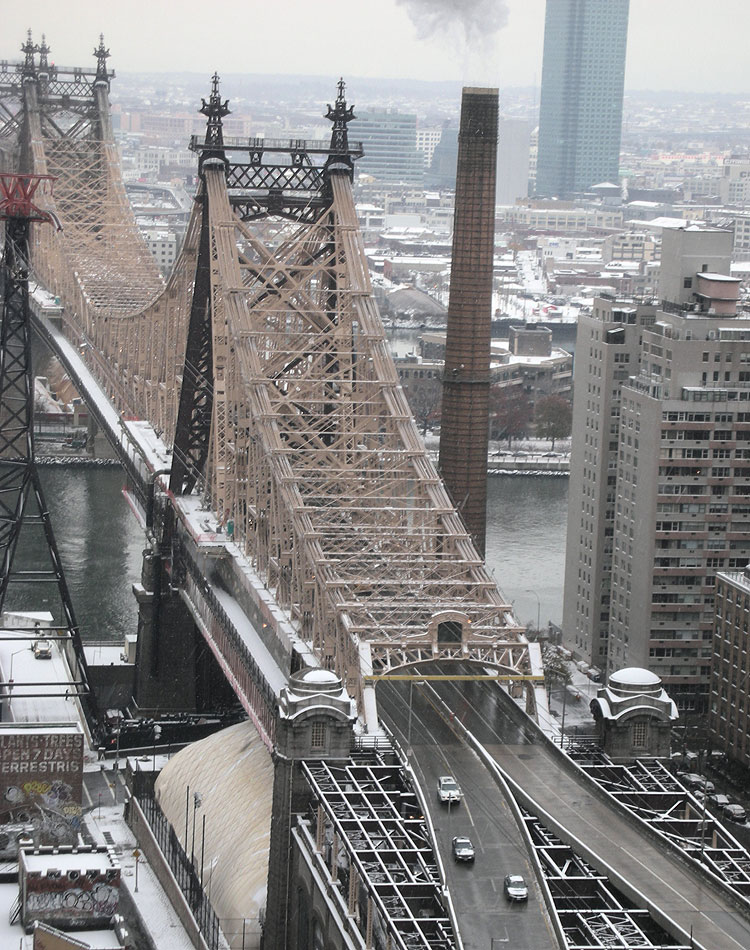
One scene was shot with Torv, Jackson, and Noble driving back and forth on the 59th Street Bridge to simulate them en route.

The opening scene in the subway was initially going to be on top of a building so that the episode would begin and end the same, but co-creator J. J. Abrams thought it would be better to start it underground and "move up throughout the episode". The episode began the setup of Olivia's backstory by revealing the Cortexiphan drug trials, which would be an ongoing plot point in continuing episodes. All the shots were chosen carefully to put the viewer in Olivia's troubled frame of mind, and consequently the episode had many tight shots that were meant to give a "sense of unease". The producers felt that shooting on the lab set was the "hardest set to shoot at on the planet" because it contained several levels that inhibited the crew's ability to move cameras around. As Goldsman had an aversion to shooting in hospitals, they used a church for the mental hospital scenes. When Olivia, Peter, and Walter are en route to the climax at the building, the shots of them in the SUV were just shots of them driving back and forth on the 59th Street Bridge.

The climactic scene where Olivia encounters Nick and the group of people at the top of the building was shot at 902 Broadway in Manhattan. Though the actors appeared to be on the edge of a very tall building, there was in fact a hidden roof extending out that they would have fallen on instead. The visual and special effects departments worked in conjunction to simulate the woman jumping off the building. While the actress simply jumped onto a tarp several feet below her, the crew rigged the car with pneumatic rams, air cannons, and cables to implode under the "weight" of her body, and then CGI was used to make the woman appear to fall on the car.

Actress Anna Torv called the episode's hotel scene her favorite of the show so far, explaining "I loved shooting that because it was the first time that Olivia really inched her way into that dynamic of Peter and Walter. She’s been kind of on the outside, and wrangling them constantly, but this gave me a glimpse into realizing everything is a little bit entwined, and building more of that emotional conflict between them. I really loved shooting that."

The final scene of the episode ended with a tape of a young Olivia in a fire-damaged room, leading to rumors her character was a fire starter. Torv however discounted this soon after, explaining "I think it's more than that... I think what they got given or what they got taught is much bigger than just starting fire". Jeff Pinkner agreed and elaborated further, "We saw the consequence. We saw that she started a fire at the end of the last episode, but I think it's a mistake to assume that that's her power. I think the truth is, it's probably a consequence of her ability". This particular scene, as well as the episode's reference to experiments Walter performed on children, comprise the main plot of the season three episode "Subject 13".

== Reception ==
=== Ratings ===
The episode was watched by more than 9.89 million viewers in the United States, with a 5.9/9 rating among all households.

=== Reviews ===
Noel Murray from The A.V. Club graded the episode with an A-; he praised the "fine job" of director/writer Akiva Goldsman, and thought the climax was "extraordinarily well-shot and performed". IGN's Ramsey Isler rated the episode 9.2/10, writing that it "is a classic example of a story you have to be patient with. This was an episode with a compelling, shocking start that kept us hooked well enough to deal with some slow points in the rest of the first half-hour. But we were rewarded for our patience with one heck of a climax and epilogue. This was well-executed TV". Andrew Hanson from the Los Angeles Times thought that while the first half wasn't very exciting, the second half had "plenty to keep up interest" as more was revealed about Olivia and Walter's backgrounds.

Rhee Dee of Pinkraygun.com liked the scenes depicting Olivia and Broyles' relationship, as well as the revelations behind the experimentation on a young Olivia, and thought the Fox promos made the episode look much lamer than it actually was. io9's Annalee Newitz loved the "great, creepy" opening scene, the arc concerning Walter's past experimentation on children, and the "well-played, funny and strange" scene when "Olivia" goes to the strip club. Though a bit disappointed with the "conspiracy" story, SFScope's Sarah Stegall nevertheless called the episode "well-crafted," enjoyed the Peter-Olivia moments, praised Torv's performance, and said Akiva Goldsman "gave us an episode built like a slow fuse: tightly wound, coiling out of sight, and finishing big.

=== Awards and nominations ===
Director-writer Akiva Goldsman submitted the episode for consideration in the Outstanding Directing for a Drama Series category at the 61st Primetime Emmy Awards, but did not receive a nomination.
