= Midnight (Fringe) =

- Fringe episode
- Episode no.: Season 1 Episode 18
- Directed by: Bobby Roth
- Written by: J. H. Wyman; Andrew Kreisberg
- Production code: 3T7667
- Original air date: April 28, 2009

Guest appearances
- Ari Graynor as Rachel Dunham; Jefferson Mays as Nicholas Boone; Trieste Dunn as Valerie Boone; Richard Short as Rob Dunn; Lily Pilblad as Ella Blake

Episode chronology
← Previous "Bad Dreams"	Next → "The Road Not Taken"
- Fringe season 1

"Midnight" is the eighteenth episode of the first season of the American science fiction drama television series Fringe. It was written by J. H. Wyman and Andrew Kreisberg, and directed by Bobby Roth. In the episode, Fringe Division apprehend a scientist with ties to the terrorist group ZFT, who will hand them everything he knows on ZFT, in exchange for helping his wife, who was infected with a contagion that makes her kill people for their spinal fluid.

The episode first aired on April 28, 2009 in the United States on the Fox Broadcasting Company, and was seen by 9.623 million viewers. Critical reactions towards the episode were mixed; reviewers criticized the episode for having a typical plot, but enjoyed some of the background stories.

== Plot ==
Fringe Division investigate the murder of Bob Dunn (Richard Short) in his apartment. He is found with a severed spinal column, and his spinal fluid drained out. While autopsying the body, Walter Bishop (John Noble) finds human teeth marks, and that the killer's saliva contains traces of an extinct strain of syphilis. The team discover that a lab sample of the strain was sold to Lubov Pharmaceutical, which also bought other samples of bacteria. Lubov has ties with ZFT. The investigation leads to the address of Nicholas Boone (Jefferson Mays), the head of the company. Boone admits he works for the bioterrorist group ZFT, and will give them everything he knows on the organization if they save his wife Valerie (Trieste Dunn) from them. After leading Olivia Dunham (Anna Torv) to a restaurant, a ZFT hideout, she finds no sign of her, and Boone admits that Valerie is the killer they are looking for; ZFT infected her with a contagion when Boone initially refused to cooperate. The contagion burns spinal fluid faster than her body can replace it. In a vain effort to work on a cure several weeks previous, Boone used some of his own spinal fluid, costing him the use of his legs. Over the course of the episode, two more male bodies are discovered, having died in a similar manner.

Boone is allowed to work with Walter in his laboratory to work on the cure, later finding out they have to make an augmented form of penicillin; the first trial is unsuccessful. Boone realizes that more spinal fluid is needed to complete the process, and sacrifices more of his. Walter realizes that Boone tricked him and asks him why and Boone responds rhetorically about what one is willing to do for those that they love, which seems to strike a chord with Walter. Astrid (Jasika Nicole) finds a link between the three victims; they all visited the same nightclub. Olivia and Peter Bishop (Joshua Jackson) enter the club and manage to find Valerie, with the help of a thermal imaging camera, as her infection causes her to have a raised body heat, and subdue her with tranquilizer guns. They return to the lab where Valerie is successfully cured, but Boone dies from the loss of spinal fluid. However, beforehand, Boone managed to have pre-recorded a message for Olivia, informing her that ZFT has been funded by Massive Dynamic founder William Bell.

In the meantime, Olivia's sister Rachel (Ari Graynor) learns that her husband is divorcing her, and demands full custody of daughter Ella, claiming that Rachel is an unfit parent. In response, Olivia asks superior Phillip Broyles (Lance Reddick) for the telephone number of his divorce lawyer.

== Reception ==
=== Ratings ===
"Midnight" first broadcast on the Fox network in the United States on April 28, 2009. It was watched by 9.623 million viewers, Fox's fifth highest rated show for the week, and a household rating of 5.6/8. It also earned a 4.0 ratings share among adults aged 18 to 49, representing 5.215 million out of the total viewers, and was the ninth largest audience on American television in that demographic the week it aired. The lead-in from American Idol helped Fringe win its timeslot, and helped Fox win the night in the 18-49 demographic.

=== Reviews ===
"This latest installment of Fringe certainly had some good points. It was well directed, it had a number of funny moments, and it gave us some different perspective on our lead characters. But it fell just a wee bit short of delivering the kind of engaging story we've come to expect from the series."

— IGN reviewer Ramsey Isler

Critical reactions of the episode were generally mixed. Annalee Newitz of io9 was positive towards the episode, opining "last night's Fringe made us feel all grody-happy inside," and it is "scoring well on the tightly-plotted-o-meter." Newitz also thought the ZFT conspiracy plotline in the episode was "an easy conspiracy to follow." Ramsey Isler of IGN rated the episode 7.5/10, having enjoyed the interactions between Peter and Walter, and of Olivia and Broyles with divorce, noting "just how creepily observant both of these characters are. It was a clever addition to the relationship between those two, and it was nice to see Broyles in a casual environment at the end of the show." However Isler felt the plot was "kind of boring", and "was more like a series of "good" moments sprinkled throughout a fairly mediocre storyline. This episode deserves some recognition for showing us new aspects of these characters we've grown to care about, but overall, the story just lacked the normal punch of a Fringe episode."

Los Angeles Times reviewer Andrew Hanson felt disappointed with the outcome of the episode; "Nicholas (and the writers who wrote him) teased of big answers to the questions surrounding ZFT but ends up giving up only one name," though he added; "Granted, it's a pretty big name: William Bell." Sarah Stegall of SFScope thought the writers "gave us some moments of real poignancy," but was disappointed of Olivia's characterization, stating "they need to study that character more closely," and that she "deserves more respect than this." Furthermore, Stegall had a problem with "the constant revelation of secrets we should have known about, secrets that should be game changers but later get relegated to background filler." Of the plot, the reviewer thought it was "A middling episode, but still much better than the early days of the series." Noel Murray of The A.V. Club rated the episode a B, stating that although it looked like it was "going to be even more of a freak-of-the-week outing this usual," by the midpoint it became "deeply tied into the show’s larger mythology," but criticised the lack of tie-ins. Furthermore it "kept fumbling towards different themes without every really completing any one thought, and had the episode explored any of the ideas more fully, I’d have probably been more into it." Television Without Pity meanwhile, graded the episode with a B.
