= The Arrival (Fringe) =

- Fringe episode
- Walter studies a mysterious cylinder that emerged from the ground.
- Episode no.: Season 1 Episode 4
- Directed by: Paul A. Edwards
- Written by: J. J. Abrams; Jeff Pinkner
- Production code: 3T7653
- Original air date: September 30, 2008
- Running time: 49 minutes

Guest appearances
- Michael Cerveris as the Observer; Michael Kelly as John Mosley; Nestor Serrano as Henry Jacobson; Lisa Joyce as Waitress; Nancy Ticotin as Waitress; David Sajadi as Technician; Jennifer Ikeda as Agent Chaperoee; Ash Roeca as Agent Rodriguez; Jacqueline Beaulieu as Nina's assistant

Episode chronology
← Previous "The Ghost Network"	Next → "Power Hungry"
- Fringe season 1

"The Arrival" is the fourth episode of the first season of the American science fiction drama television series Fringe. The episode was written by the series co-creator and executive producer J. J. Abrams and executive producer and show runner Jeff Pinkner. Paul A. Edwards directed it.

The episode concerns a mysterious cylindrical object called "The Beacon" which appears at a construction site in New York City. The story also involves the relationship between Walter Bishop (John Noble) and the mysterious Observer (Michael Cerveris in his first feature appearance).

"The Arrival" first aired in the United States on September 30, 2008 on the Fox Network to more than 10 million viewers. It received positive to mixed reviews, with many praising the new revelations about the Observers.

== Plot ==
At a diner in Brooklyn, New York, a bald man with no eyebrows sits down at a table and orders a raw roast beef sandwich with eleven jalapeño peppers and a glass of room temperature water. When the sandwich arrives, he drowns it in Tabasco sauce and black pepper and wolfs it down in large, quick bites, to the bemusement of the diner staff. During this time he is also watching the construction site across the street through high-tech binoculars and taking notes from right to left in unrecognizable characters. The ground shakes and a gas main explodes at the site, toppling a crane. The bald man—the Observer—calmly pays for his sandwich and wanders to the gaping hole where the construction site was. On a wireless phone, he says "It has arrived."

In their shared hotel room Walter keeps Peter awake by reciting the chemical formula for root beer. The next morning Peter expresses his unhappiness with the arrangement to Olivia (Anna Torv) and tells her he wants to leave. She can't let him do that, telling him that Walter refuses to work without him. The Fringe Team investigates the object that arrived in Brooklyn, a cylinder that is determined to vibrate at a particular frequency. In the course of the investigation, Walter assaults and forcibly sedates Junior Agent Astrid Farnsworth (Jasika Nicole) in order to hide the cylinder. He later meets with the bald man at a diner.

Meanwhile, a violent criminal named John Mosley (Michael Kelly) is also searching for the Beacon. After killing one of Olivia's mentors, Mosley kidnaps and tortures Peter to find out the location. After he recovers the beacon from the grave of Robert Bishop, John Mosley is taken down by Olivia. The beacon escapes into the earth, and The Observer reports that its departure was "on schedule." Peter confronts The Observer about the beacon, only to have a gibberish conversation that implies that the Observer knows what Peter is going to say before he says it, or, as Peter puts it, "he knew me [...] he was inside my head." The Observer then knocks Peter out with an advanced sort of stun gun.

After being hospitalized for his injuries, Peter admits to Olivia that his experience with The Observer has caused him to start to believe in The Pattern. Peter decides that he wants to stay with the Fringe team until he gets some explanations. Walter apologizes to Astrid, who doesn't yet forgive him. Walter admits to Peter that, during an accident many years ago, a mysterious third party saved both their lives. The man was bald and had no eyebrows, who "knew my [Walter's] thoughts before I did." Walter admits that his behaviour regarding the capsule, and his desire to protect it, was motivated by his debt to this bald man, and that the capsule somehow contained instructions from this man. At the end of the episode, Olivia returns home, and sees recently deceased lover John Scott (Mark Valley) in her kitchen. He greets her with "Hello, Liv."

== Production ==
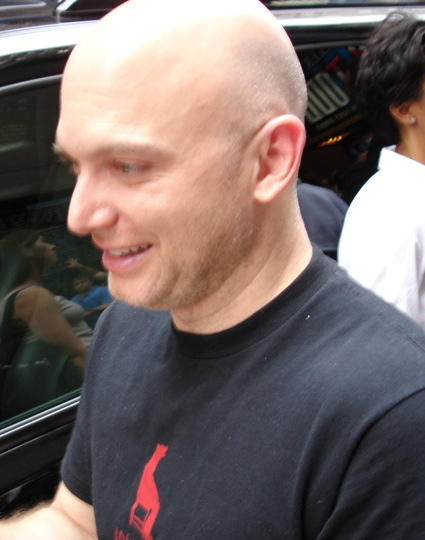
"The Arrival" marked the first episode devoted to the Observer, played by Michael Cerveris.

"The Arrival" was written by co-creator J. J. Abrams and executive producer Jeff Pinkner. Paul A. Edwards directed the episode, his second of the season. Early in the series, actress Jasika Nicole feared her character was going to become liked by the audience only to suddenly die. She explained that "When I was reading the script in the episode where Dr. Bishop stabs her in the neck with the sedative … and all [the script] says is, 'Dr. Bishop grabs Astrid from behind and jams the needle into her neck.' Then it fades to black. My mouth hung open for awhile and I was like, 'Oh my God, I only made it through six episodes."

While Michael Cerveris has appeared as the Observer in the three previous episodes—and has appeared in every episode to date—his previous appearances had been brief background cameos. When initially cast for Fringe, Cerveris assumed he was a mere guest star, and that his character was "one of several nuggets dropped in" by J. J. Abrams in a manner similar to his other science fiction series, Lost. Cerveris soon discovered that his character was "this sort of Where's Waldo thing (as) the linchpin in an overarching story of the series". He continued:

I wasn't told, because I don't think they knew at the time, whether I was a good guy, a bad guy, human, alien, other-dimensional. I just kind of felt my way through it with the first directors and input, obviously, from the writers in the scripts that we had. Even things like wardrobe, they weren't given extremely big instructions, so we kind of worked things out together and just found something we all thought was interesting and iconic and went with that.

— Michael Cerveris, Blastr

Executive producer Jeff Pinkner commented, "Our goal was to take a character who is by definition unknowable and make him someone you can connect to emotionally. He's more specifically connected with the overall character mythology of the show than we ever expected." The decision to remove his eyebrows was made an hour before he first appeared, which caused stress in the make-up department because Cerveris would not shave his eyebrows; he commented about the affair, "I've got a little too much else going on, and who knows if they would ever grow back. I have little enough hair as it is." "The Arrival" was the first episode in which the Observer had dialogue, and the first in which he was treated as a focal character. In addition to Cerveris, actor Michael Kelly made a guest appearance in the episode.

In the episode, a character introduced as "the Rogue" has a specialized weapon that fires massive amounts of energy. To simulate the energy gun the Rogue fires at Olivia in the forest, the crew placed pyrotechnic charges near the trees to make it appear large blasts were close to hitting her. In a DVD special feature, one of the crew commented it was "challenging" to choreograph the fight scene between The Observer and Peter, because the former does not fight back as he is only there to observe.

The DVD special features include a deleted scene, where Peter emphatically denies the existence of parallel universes after Walter implies their existence in a quote from Shakespeare's Hamlet.

== Reception ==
=== Ratings ===
More than 10.04 million viewers watched "The Arrival" as it was broadcast in the United States, for a 4.3/11 share among viewers 18–49. At the point the episode aired, Fringe was the most watched new show on television in the important 18-49 demographic. Several days after its airing, Fox announced on October 1, 2008 that Fringe had been picked up for a full season order.

=== Reviews ===
The episode's reception ranged from positive to mixed. Critic Maureen Ryan was very positive about the episode in her blog at the Chicago Tribune, writing, "I liked this week's episode, and for once, it wasn't a case of really wanting to like it and trying to find reasons to see past various flaws. I just enjoyed the hour and felt it had just the right mixture of creepiness and character development (plus, the Observer was awesome. If only they'd called him the Watcher, but let's not quibble)." Alan Sepinwall of The Star-Ledger found "The Arrival" a noticeable improvement over previous episodes. "...After being more than prepared to give "Fringe" That's It For Me! status going into the episode, I enjoyed the strangeness of it—The Observer's hairlessness and diet, Capt. Patterson from "Generation Kill" toting around a futuristic-looking ray gun and a retro-looking mind-reading machine, Walter casually injecting whatsername with a sedative—that I think I'll be sticking around for a bit... If I can brace myself for the probability that this will all lead to nonsense, I can groove on all the atmospherics along the way. And, if nothing else, Abrams is great at atmosphere."

"Fringe is the kind of show I really want to love. I like it well enough, but so far, but there's a number of things that just don't quite work as well as they should. There are also times where the show simply feels far too similar to shows that have come before it – without distinguishing itself enough as its own entity. Even if it's not a direct link to The X-Files, the show often elicits a distinct sense of déjà vu. "

— IGN writer Travis Fickett

Also seeing improvement was Jane Boursaw of AOL's TV Squad, commenting "Tonight's episode definitely got me intrigued about fringe science, and this is the first time I can really say I'm looking forward to the next episode. It's a combination of things, and of course, Walter's scattered ramblings about whatever strikes him at any particular moment." Less impressed was Noel Murray of The Onion's A.V. Club, who gave the episode a grade of C+. Murray wrote, "'The Arrival' was the weirdest episode of Fringe yet–a deep-down sci-fi spookfest that minimized the show's procedural side and instead raised far more questions than it answered. In fact, I can't think of any questions that "The Arrival" satisfactorily answered–not even 'What happened in the Fringe episode entitled 'The Arrival'?'... The shock and awe factor of "The Arrival" was strong, but as a piece of storytelling, the episode felt slight and soggy, and hardly the satisfying standalone experience that the creators promised each Fringe chapter would be."

IGN contributor Travis Fickett rated the episode 7.5/10, explaining that he liked the "attention to bits of logic that work as the glue, holding the show together" such as Peter's security clearance, but was skeptical of the episode's fringe science. Fickett also noticed many similarities to The X-Files, writing "not enough is being done to move the show into its own direction"; he concluded "The production values are exceptional, the acting is top notch, and it certainly seems to be going somewhere. Where, is another matter all together, but there does seem to be momentum." Website blogger io9 highlighted "The Arrival" as one of the "crucial" episodes new viewers must watch to understand the show. Jeff Jensen of Entertainment Weekly named "The Arrival" the twelfth best episode of the series, explaining the episode "formally, memorably introduced the Observer known as September (Michael Cerveris), a Tabasco-loving, Fedora-wearing, bald-headed time traveling surveyor from the future. His altercation with Peter in the graveyard — mirroring his movements; parroting his speech in real time — was one of the show's earliest water-cooler-weird moments."
