= The Road Not Taken (Fringe) =

- Fringe episode
- Episode no.: Season 1 Episode 19
- Directed by: Frederick E. O. Toye
- Story by: Akiva Goldsman
- Teleplay by: Jeff Pinkner; J. R. Orci
- Production code: 3T7668
- Original air date: May 5, 2009

Guest appearances
- Michael Cerveris as The Observer; Richard Bekins as Isaac Winters; Jennifer Ferrin as Susan Pratt and Nancy Lewis; Clint Howard as Michael Carlin aka Emmanuel Grayson; Michael Gaston as Sanford Harris

Episode chronology
| ← Previous "Midnight" | Next → "There's More Than One of Everything" |
- Fringe season 1

"The Road Not Taken" is the nineteenth episode of the first season of the American television series Fringe. It centers on the death of a young woman (Jennifer Ferrin), who spontaneously combusts in the middle of a street. The Fringe team's investigation leads them to learn more about the drug trials Olivia (Anna Torv) experienced as a child, as well as other revelations.

The episode's story was written by Akiva Goldsman, while the teleplay was co-written by executive producer Jeff Pinkner and supervising producer J.R. Orci. It was directed by Fred Toye. The title is based on the poem of the same name by Robert Frost. Robert Chiappetta and Glen Whitman, frequent contributors to the series, aided in the episode's production by "find[ing] a new and gruesome way to blow people up," and rooting its explanation in science.

It first aired in the United States on May 5, 2009, on the Fox network. An estimated 9.245 million viewers watched the episode, making it the network's fifth most watched show for the week. "The Road Not Taken" received mostly positive reviews from television critics, with many praising Olivia's visions of the other universe and John Noble's performance.

== Plot ==
The Fringe Division investigates the case of a woman (Jennifer Ferrin) who "spontaneously combusts" in the middle of a busy New York street. The team discovers that the victim is the subject of a ZFT experiment to cultivate pyrokinesis. As they investigate, Olivia (Anna Torv) experiences "visions" while awake. Walter (John Noble) suggests she is seeing a parallel universe which has branched off from our own. Olivia and Peter (Joshua Jackson) visit an agoraphobic website designer (Clint Howard) who is apparently aware of William Bell, the drug trials, and the coming war, although his credibility comes into question when he believes himself to be a character in the plot of Star Trek.

Using information from her visions, Olivia tracks down the victim's twin sister, who only moments before was kidnapped for more ZFT experimentation. Harris (Michael Gaston) is revealed to be responsible for the crimes, and while closing in on him, Olivia gets locked in a room with the twin sister, whose unstable pyrokinetic abilities threaten both their lives. With Olivia's guidance, the woman focuses her energy on Harris and incinerates him. Olivia finds out that the sisters were part of the same nootropic drug trial that she was as a child. She presses Walter to reveal why he and William Bell were developing "supersoldiers," but Walter only shares that it was for protection against some impending doom that he regrettably cannot recall.

Meanwhile, Walter reveals that the ZFT manuscript was written by William Bell, and that the copy of the manuscript that ZFT uses is missing a chapter dealing with ethics. He locates the original, but the Observer (Michael Cerveris) shows up and takes Walter away, cryptically stating: "it is time to go." Nina Sharp (Blair Brown) visits Broyles (Lance Reddick) to discuss the Observer, and is later shot in her hotel by two masked gunmen using a suppressed pistol.

== Production ==
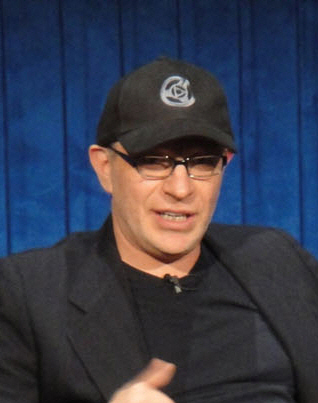
Akiva Goldsman wrote the story on which this episode is based.

The episode's teleplay was co-written by supervising producer J.R. Orci and executive producer Jeff Pinkner, based on a story by Akiva Goldsman. Producer Frederick E. O. Toye served as director. Goldsman had joined the series halfway through the season by writing and directing the mythology-riddled episode "Bad Dreams", and was instrumental in convincing the showrunners to depict more Fringe mythology earlier than planned, most notably with the depiction of parallel universes. The title of "The Road Not Taken" is based on the Robert Frost poem of the same name.

New Media consultants and scientists Robert Chiappetta and Glen Whitman aided in the production of the episode. They had worked on the series throughout the first season, with their role ranging from directly writing episodes to advising the others on scientific concepts. Whitman later explained that they "come to us with questions: Is this possible? Where can we go with this? Then we go and read the very technical articles, or talk with scientists, and then translate that into the storytelling medium of our show." For "The Road Not Taken", he and Chiappetta were asked to again "find a new and gruesome way to blow people up," this time by rooting it in the concept of pyrokinesis. Chiappetta explained, "They wanted to have someone spontaneously combust and burn up. So this is where we sort of leaned back into our mythology."

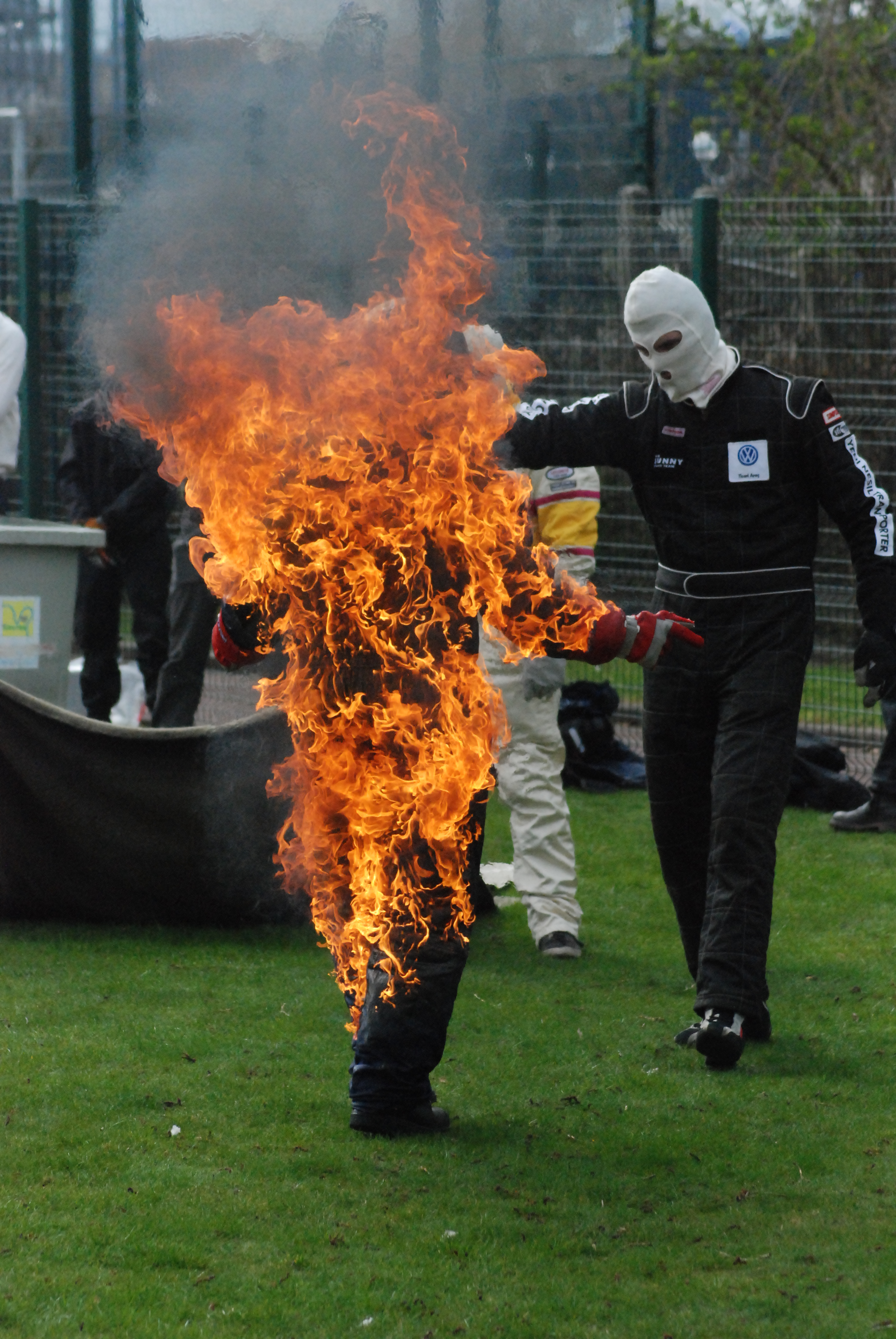
As the episode centered around the concept of pyrokinesis, several immolation stunts had to be performed carefully.

They and the episode writers developed a storyline in which a victim's childhood experimentation, when they were injected with something, was now "coming back to haunt them." Whitman noted that the concept, like others in the show, was based on real scientific knowledge, "The notion is, some kind of a medical treatment that they were given allowed their brain to command vibrations that would take place. It really is true that essentially what heat is is vibrations of atoms, so if your brain can cause some kind of vibration to take place, eventually you could create enough heat to even create a flame." Pinkner added, "And if you haven't yet mastered pyrokinesis and the ability to excite molecules that are outside your body, well then you're going to excite the ones inside your body and you're going to blow up, sadly."

For Harris' immolation scene, first unit director Gary Rake emphasized safety, explaining that "everyone really has to think about what's going on and really focus tonight. This is a quintessential moment where we can't have any mistakes." Everything in the scene was flame-retardant, and a special burn unit crew was present. Actor Michael Gaston's arm, immersed in a special gel, was actually inflamed and then extinguished after filming was cut. Then, Gaston's stand-in, stuntman Don Hewitt, Jr, was completely set on fire. Hewitt wore the same costume, a wig, a face shield, and was also covered in a flammable gel. It was Gaston's final episode with the series.

Actress Jasika Nicole, who plays junior FBI agent Astrid Farnsworth, described the episode in a May 2009 interview:

It's about spontaneously combusting. This is the episode I get to get out of the lab. I remember thinking I can't wait to see what the set's going to look like and how they will make it look when the spontaneous combusting takes place. And we get there and it's just smoke on the walls, like a kitchen fire. I thought that was so funny because I thought there were going to be body parts everywhere, like a small explosion. But it's a really good episode, which leads you into the coolest parts of the finale episode.

== Cultural references ==
The episode contains many cultural references, which Annalee Newitz of io9 attributed to the episode's writers: "It was bound to happen that one day these four supernerds would get together and spawn an episode so packed with in-groupy pop culture references that smacking is probably in order." Peter and Walter reference the 1984 supernatural comedy film Ghostbusters while investigating the opening scene's case, and later debate the origin of the term pyrokinesis, coined by author Stephen King in his 1981 novel Firestarter. Emmanuel Grayson references the titular character of the 1982 science fiction film Star Trek II: The Wrath of Khan, as well as Romulans and the United Federation of Planets, when describing William Bell's conspiracies to Peter and Olivia. Grayson also believes himself to be Mr. Spock. This reference is made even more appropriate by the fact that Spock's mother was named Amanda Grayson. That Clint Howard played the character here gives further connection to Star Trek, having played Balok.

The key conspiracy Grayson describes is the attempt by William Bell "To create super-soldiers, like Khan Noonien Singh, to defend us in the coming war [against] renegade Romulans from the future, here to change the time line, the sworn enemy of the federation." Strengthening the connection, William Bell will later be played in this series by Leonard Nimoy, the original Spock.

Fourteen years later, this episode becomes a cultural forward reference for the Star Trek: Strange New Worlds episode "Tomorrow and Tomorrow and Tomorrow", which shows us a Lieutenant La'an Noonien-Singh, descendant of Khan Noonien Singh, as that soldier fighting a Renegade Romulan time traveler who is attempting to change the timeline and prevent the formation of the Federation. This episode also plays with the idea of a seeming conspiracy theorist who is describing the actual plot reality.

== Reception ==
=== Ratings ===
"The Road Not Taken" was first broadcast in the United States on May 5, 2009, on the Fox network. It was watched by an estimated 9.245 million viewers, making it the network's fifth most watched show for the week. The episode earned a 4.0/10 ratings share among adults aged 18 to 49, meaning that it was seen by 4.0 percent of all 18- to 49-year-olds, and 10 percent of all 18- to 49-year-olds watching television at the time of broadcast. Fox later aired repeats of season one episodes, including "The Road Not Taken", that featured Twitter posts by some of Fringe's cast and producers.

=== Reviews ===
The episode received generally positive reviews from television critics. TV Squad's Jane Boursaw called the episode's case "an interesting premise" and was pleased that "things are really, REALLY starting to come together in a big way, which is good, considering that the finale is fast approaching". Annalee Newitz of io9 declared it to be "one of the most rewarding episodes ever for people who love the show's mythology," and found Olivia's universe-hopping ability to be "truly cool". Newitz concluded that "this was a truly awesome episode with a lot of payoff for those of us who have been glued to the set every Tuesday night, looking for answers." The website later listed "The Road Not Taken" as one of the "crucial" episodes new viewers must watch to get into the show. Television Without Pity graded the episode with a A−.

"There have been times that the show has kind of wandered on some detours and given us some one-off stories. Those were hit and miss, but the show is definitely at its best when it focuses on its unique and multifaceted mythology, and this episode advanced that mythos with stunning revelations and surprises that should make for a great finale."

— IGN writer Ramsey Isler

Noel Murray of The A.V. Club complimented the episode's opening scene for providing a succinct synopsis of the season to new viewers who may have been newly discovering the series after watching its lead-in, American Idol. Though he graded the episode with an A−, Murray did however critique its climactic scene for being "clumsily paced and staged". Murray mainly found positive aspects with the episode, explaining, "For a show that started out being a fairly dour procedural with wacky mad-scientist elements, Fringe has really worked its way into that fantasy/sci-fi sweet-spot, where its own forward momentum makes the ridiculous look likely and arcane mythology seem well-worth the time to sort through and analyze." Other highlights Murray found was Noble's performance, which he considered his "finest moment in the series to date," and Olivia's visions of the other universe.

IGN's Ramsey Isler rated the episode with a score of 9.2 out of 10. He thought that after a "stereotypical, over-the-top" characterization in past episodes, Gaston "stepped up his portrayal" as Harris and was "annoying... in a much more believable way." Isler found the revelation surrounding Harris to be "deliciously surprising," and wrote that the "last twenty minutes of the episode really ramped up the suspense and action." However, the IGN reviewer thought that while the conversation with Grayson was an "hilarious homage to Leonard Nimoy, it seemed completely superfluous in terms of the overall storyline." Isler concluded his review on a positive note by focusing on Noble's performance, calling it "one of the best scenes [he] has ever done as Walter Bishop. It was emotional, believable, and perfectly accurate for a character that has a high level of self-loathing and remorse for what he's done, and the hopeless frustration of not being able to remember exactly why he did it."
