= Pilot (Fringe) =

- Fringe episode
- Anna Torv as Special Agent Olivia Dunham in a sensory deprivation tank.
- Episode no.: Season 1 Episode 1
- Directed by: Alex Graves
- Written by: J. J. Abrams; Alex Kurtzman; Roberto Orci
- Production code: 276038
- Original air date: September 9, 2008
- Running time: 81 minutes

Guest appearances
- Jason Butler Harner as Richard Steig and Morgan Steig; Peter Outerbridge as Dr. Reyes; Bernadeta Wrobel as Flight attendant; Katerina Taxia as FBI Agent Dawson; Peter Sawyer as Denver Man; Max Topplin as Angry Teen; Shaun Shetty as Indian Man; Andreas Frank as Pilot; Dennis Mockler as Co-pilot; Lee Jay Gladman as CDC officer; Andrew Hinkson as Guard; Joan Barrett as Old Woman on Plane; Jeff Topping as Agent #1; Sean Clement as Agent #2; Anousha Alamian as Agent #4; Kelly King as Nurse; Tauqir Shah as Iraqi Businessman #1; Omar Habib as Iraqi Businessman #2; Quinn Martin as Orderly; Tre Smith as Man with John's Gurney; Jacqueline Beaulieu as Nina's assistant; Edward M. Kelahan as Police officer; Michael Cerveris as The Observer; Rick Parker as Cow Delivery Man; Ralph A. Wilburn, Jr. as FBI Agent

Episode chronology
← Previous —	Next → "The Same Old Story"
- Fringe season 1

The pilot episode of the Fringe television series premiered on the Fox network on September 9, 2008. The pilot to season 1 was written by the creators of the series—J. J. Abrams, Alex Kurtzman, and Roberto Orci—and directed by Alex Graves. The episode introduces the most central character, Olivia Dunham, portrayed by Anna Torv, an FBI special agent forced into the world of applied fringe science after a number of freak incidents. Dr. Walter Bishop, a scientist formerly incarcerated in a mental institution for over seventeen years, is portrayed by John Noble, while Joshua Jackson plays his son, Peter, who is hired by Olivia to assist with Walter and his work.

Although the pilot was set in and around Boston, Massachusetts, filming occurred in Toronto, Ontario, Canada. The episode cost $10 million to produce, making it one of the most expensive pilots in television history. The pilot was leaked online three months prior to its broadcast on television, leading to speculation that it was leaked deliberately to increase interest in the program. However, this was denied by executive producer Bryan Burk. The episode was generally well received by critics, and was watched by 9.13 million American viewers on its premiere.

== Plot ==
A man on an international flight injects himself with an insulin pen, which releases a biological agent that quickly kills everyone aboard by causing their flesh to crystallize. The airplane's autopilot system lands the plane at Boston's Logan Airport, where various federal agencies create a task force to investigate what occurred during the flight. F.B.I. Special Agent Olivia Dunham and her partner, Agent Scott (Mark Valley), are together in bed at a motel, where Scott says that he loves her. Dunham receives a call from her boss Charlie Francis (Kirk Acevedo), who tells her to head to the airport. Dunham is added to the interagency task force headed by Phillip Broyles (Lance Reddick).

Following a tip, Dunham and Scott are sent to a storage facility where they uncover a biochemical laboratory, which explodes when detonated by a suspect they are chasing. Scott is affected by the chemicals released in the explosion, and is placed into an artificial coma to slow the progression of the chemical reaction. While investigating a possible cure to Scott's condition, Dunham blackmails Peter Bishop to gain access to his father Dr. Walter Bishop, whose top-secret work at Harvard in "fringe science" resulted in him being sent to a mental institution. Dunham manages to release Walter from the institution; however, he becomes enraged when he discovers his laboratory in Harvard has been shut down. Broyles reopens the laboratory, where Dunham transfers Scott's body. To identify the man from the storage facility, Walter synchronizes Dunham's brainwaves with the comatose Scott's so that she can read his mind. Walter claims that syncing brainwaves, and even reanimating the dead, can be accomplished up to six hours after death. With the help of Dunham's assistant, federal agent Astrid Farnsworth (Jasika Nicole), the experiment succeeds. Dunham identifies the man in Scott's memory, Morgan Steig, as a passenger on the plane. The team learns Steig's twin brother, Richard Steig, was an employee of Massive Dynamic, a company founded by William Bell, Walter's old lab partner.

Dunham goes to Massive Dynamic headquarters and meets with executive director Nina Sharp (Blair Brown), who agrees to give her all the information on Steig. Steig is arrested and initially refuses to provide a list of the ingredients present in the toxin, but Peter's threat of exposing him to the chemicals causes him to reveal the ingredients. The information provides a cure for Scott. Stieg reveals that he did not sell his chemicals, but was forced into what he did by someone from Dunham's office. He leads Dunham to a buried tape recording of his phone conversations about the chemicals and the attack, where Dunham realizes that Scott was involved with the attack from the beginning. While she races back to the hospital, Scott awakens and kills Stieg. Scott is chased by Dunham, but crashes his car and is mortally wounded. Before he dies, Scott asks Dunham why Broyles would send her to investigate the storage units in the first place. Dunham convinces the Bishops to stay and help her with her new work, which Broyles describes as a task force to investigate events related to "the pattern". Elsewhere, Scott's dead body is brought to a Massive Dynamic high-tech lab, where Sharp orders that Scott be interrogated, since he has only been dead for five hours.

== Production ==
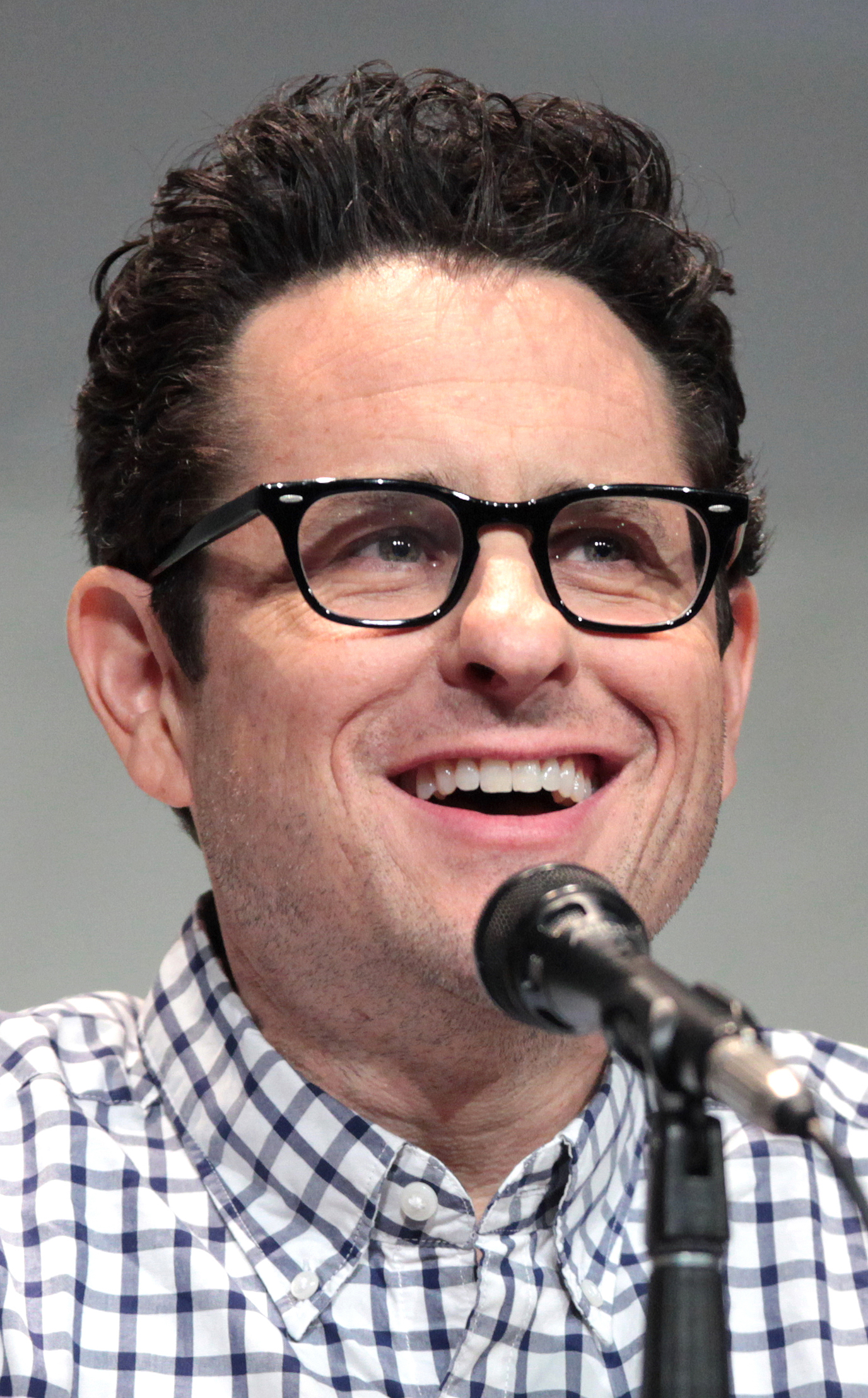
Abrams encouraged audiences to watch because "one of the assets we happen to have are three great characters played by three wonderful actors at the core of the show."

Co-creator J. J. Abrams' inspiration for Fringe came from a range of sources, including the writings of Michael Crichton, the Ken Russell film Altered States, and the television series The X-Files and The Twilight Zone. The specific story for Fringe was developed during long conversations between series creators Abrams, Roberto Orci and Alex Kurtzman. The team was discussing several different options, and the idea behind Fringe appealed to them most because it contained a long-term story and characters' backstories which were not "evident but alluded to in the pilot." The team spent a lot of time thinking about the "trifecta of characters" that they needed to have in the series, and why there were uniquely interesting. The creators decided on the idea of a father-son story because it was compelling and accessible, "you don't necessarily have to know anything about science, because everyone has a parent and everyone has issues with a parent. And I think for us it's always about coming into it through character." Orci stated that the series is a combination of a procedural and an "extremely serialized and very culty" series, quoting as examples of each, Law & Order and Lost.

The first actors cast in the pilot were Kirk Acevedo and Mark Valley in mid January 2008. John Noble and Lance Reddick were next to be cast, although it was incorrectly believed that Tomas Arana had been cast in Reddick's role. This was followed by the casting of Anna Torv, Blair Brown and Jasika Nicole. Abrams said that Torv was cast because she was a combination of "sophistication, great talent, amazing looks and a complexity that is the key to the character being an interesting central character." Kurtzman felt that she was someone "you want to spend time with", which was critical to a series about science. Joshua Jackson was the last series regular to be cast. Jackson auditioned for the role of James T. Kirk in Abrams' Star Trek and believed this is what impressed the producer to cast him in his television project. According to Abrams, Jackson's casting was "very last minute."

While the pilot was set in and around Boston, production was set in Toronto, Ontario, Canada. The episode cost $10 million to produce, making it one of the most expensive pilots in television history. Following the pilot's filming, production for the series moved to New York. The producers were forced to hire a new cow for the remainder of the season because they were not allowed to transport the original cow from Canada to New York. Production team members noted that they were prepared to paint new cows if viewers noted the differences in spots.

Three months prior to its broadcast, an incomplete version of the pilot was released through BitTorrent clients, fueling speculation that it was leaked deliberately to increase interest in the program. Executive producer Burk denied the claims, saying that "we hate putting anything out there until it's done, and that's really the reason why you guys didn't get any advance copies." Abrams said that while the production crew "freaked out" about the leak, he was pleased that the "response has been much more positive than not, especially for something that wasn't completed yet." The broadcast version of the pilot had new scenes added while other scenes were removed; Abrams also said that there was "tightening and moving some moments here and there", and the ending was entirely different. Burk also stated that the composer, Michael Giacchino, had not finished his score at the time of the leak, and most of the featured music was temp music. A variation of a piece of Giacchino's music called "Hollywood and Vines" used in the pilot was originally featured on Lost, as it was created for that show, also created by Abrams.

== Reception ==
=== Ratings ===
"Pilot" was watched by 9.13 million American viewers, with ratings improving over the course of the episode. The episode garnered a 3.2/9 Nielsen ratings in the key 18- to 49-year-old demographic, and was the 12th most watched series of the week. The 3.2 refers to 3.2% of all people of ages 18–49 years old in the U.S., and the 9 refers to 9% of all people of ages 18–49 years old watching television at the time of the broadcast in the U.S. The pilot officially premiered at the 2008 Television Critics Association tour, where it received mixed to positive reviews from critics.

=== Reviews ===
Metacritic gave the episode a Metascore—a weighted average based on the impressions of a select 25 critical reviews—of 67, signifying generally favorable reviews. Barry Garron of The Hollywood Reporter found it promising because "it is reminiscent of better-of-the-sexes charm." USA Today's Robert Bianco said, "what Abrams brings to Fringe is a director's eye for plot and pace, a fan's love of sci-fi excitement, and a story-teller's gift for investing absurd events with real emotions and relatable characters." Travis Fickett of IGN gave the pilot 7.6 out of 10, calling it "a lackluster pilot that promises to be a pretty good series." Tim Goodman of San Francisco Chronicle remarked that despite "some flaws in it—mostly from a clash of tones—it still overdelivers on creativity, creepiness, fine acting and burgeoning character development." Chicago Sun-Times' Misha Davenport called it an "update of The X-Files with the addition of terrorism and the office of Homeland Security.

John Doyle of The Globe and Mail called the pilot "splendidly made." However, Doyle considered the instance of Torv stripping to a bikini "indulgent", and questioned the wisdom of making "her body an object of scrutiny" in the first episode. Matthew Gilbert of Boston Globe wrote that "after the electrifying start, Fringe unfolds as an uneven, unwieldy piece of work that provides very few chills and thrills." LA Weekly's Robert Abele found Fringe is "a smorgasbord of a show, but one a little too synthetically engineered to allow you the chance to discover what it is." John Leonard of New York was skeptical of the premise and storyline, but found Torv "wonderfully played" her character. Heather Havrilesky of Salon.com felt the plot was too over-the-top, and described Abrams as "the ultimate boyish idiot-savant imaginator... He can't exercise a little self-restraint."

The pilot episode was negatively received by the conservative "family values" advocacy group Parents Television Council, who named the show the worst of the week and denounced the "excessive violence and gore."

== See also ==
- Fringe episodes
