= Bryan Burk =

American film and television producer

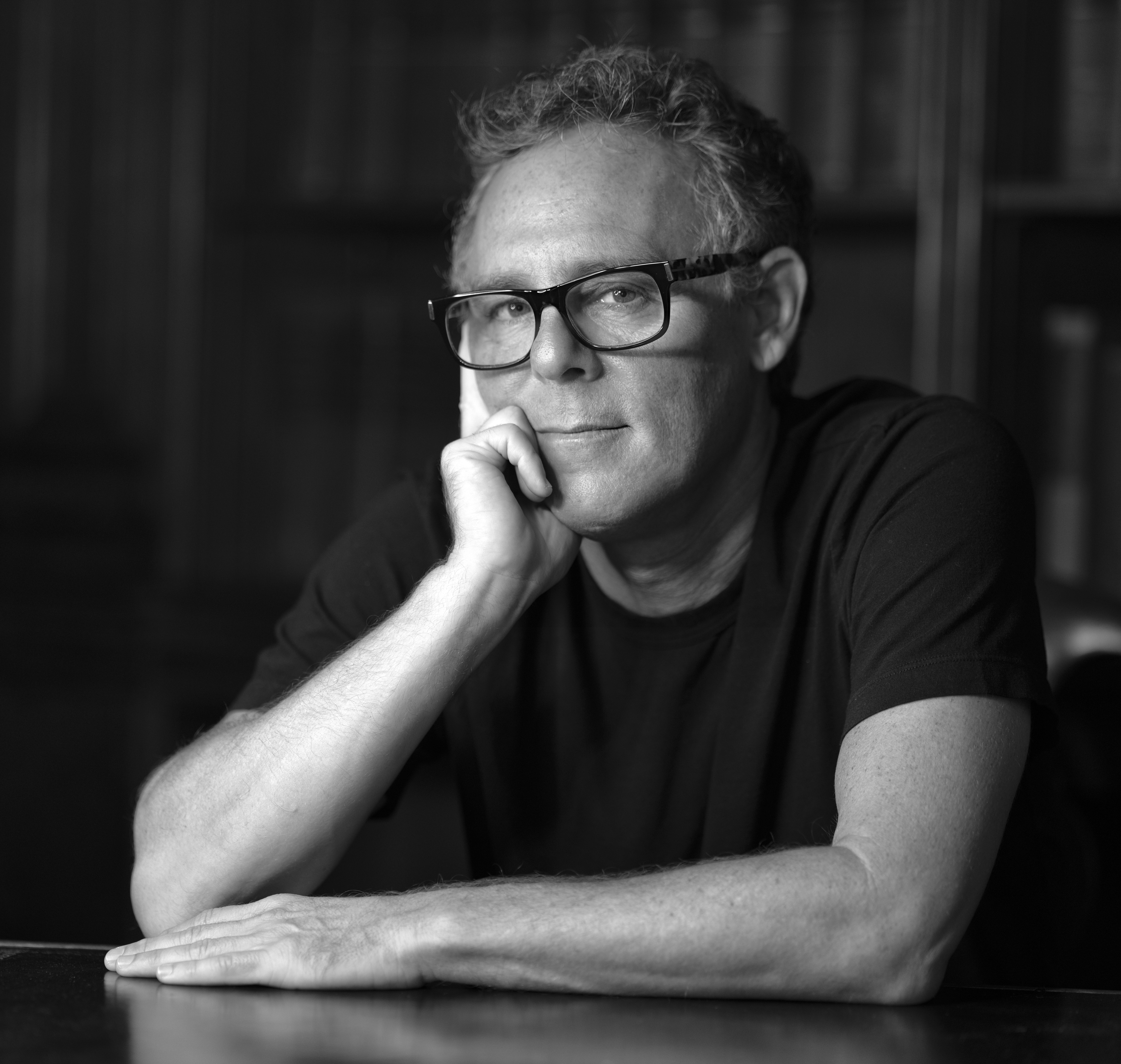
- Burk in 2021
- Born: Los Angeles
- Occupations: Film producer, television producer, actor
- Years active: 1994–present

Bryan Burk is an American film and television producer.

He is mostly known for producing movies in collaboration with J. J. Abrams, including the Star Trek reboot series, the Mission: Impossible films Ghost Protocol and Rogue Nation, Star Wars: The Force Awakens, and the TV series Alias, Lost, Fringe, and Person of Interest. His only work outside of producing was co-writing the Fringe episode "There's More Than One of Everything".

== Career ==
Born to a Jewish family, Burk is a graduate of USC's School of Cinema-Television in 1991. He began his career working with producers Brad Weston at Columbia Pictures, Ned Tanen at Sony Pictures and John Davis at FOX. In 1995, he joined Gerber Pictures, where he developed TNT's Emmy-winning James Dean.

Together with J. J. Abrams, he founded the production company Bad Robot Productions in 2001. As Executive Vice President of the company, Burk serves as executive producer for all of their television and film productions.

In 2009, Burk co-wrote the story of the season one finale of Fringe, "There's More Than One of Everything", with Akiva Goldsman, while Jeff Pinkner and J. H. Wyman wrote the teleplay.

He frequently collaborates with a tightly knit group of film professionals which include J. J. Abrams, Damon Lindelof, Adam Horowitz, Alex Kurtzman, Roberto Orci, Edward Kitsis, Andre Nemec, Josh Appelbaum, and Jeff Pinkner.

== Filmography ==
=== Feature films ===
Producer

- Cloverfield (2008)
- Morning Glory (2010)
- Super 8 (2011)
- Mission: Impossible – Ghost Protocol (2011)
- Star Trek Into Darkness (2013)
- Mission: Impossible – Rogue Nation (2015)
- Star Wars: The Force Awakens (2015)
- 10 Cloverfield Lane (2016)
- Star Trek Beyond (2016)

Executive producer

- Star Trek (2009)
- Infinitely Polar Bear (2014)

=== Television ===
Executive producer

Year	Title	Notes
2004–2010	Lost	
2005	The Catch	Pilot
2006–2007	What About Brian	
2006–2007	Six Degrees	
2008–2013	Fringe	Also story writer (Episode "There's More Than One of Everything")
2009	Anatomy of Hope	Pilot
2010	Undercovers	
2011–2016	Person of Interest	
2012	Alcatraz	
2012	Shelter	Pilot
2012–2014	Revolution	
2013–2014	Almost Human	
2014	Believe	
2015	Dead People	Pilot
2016	11.22.63	
2016	Roadies	
2016–2022	Westworld	

Co-producer

- Alias (2001–2006)
