= Jeff Pinkner =

American television writer and producer

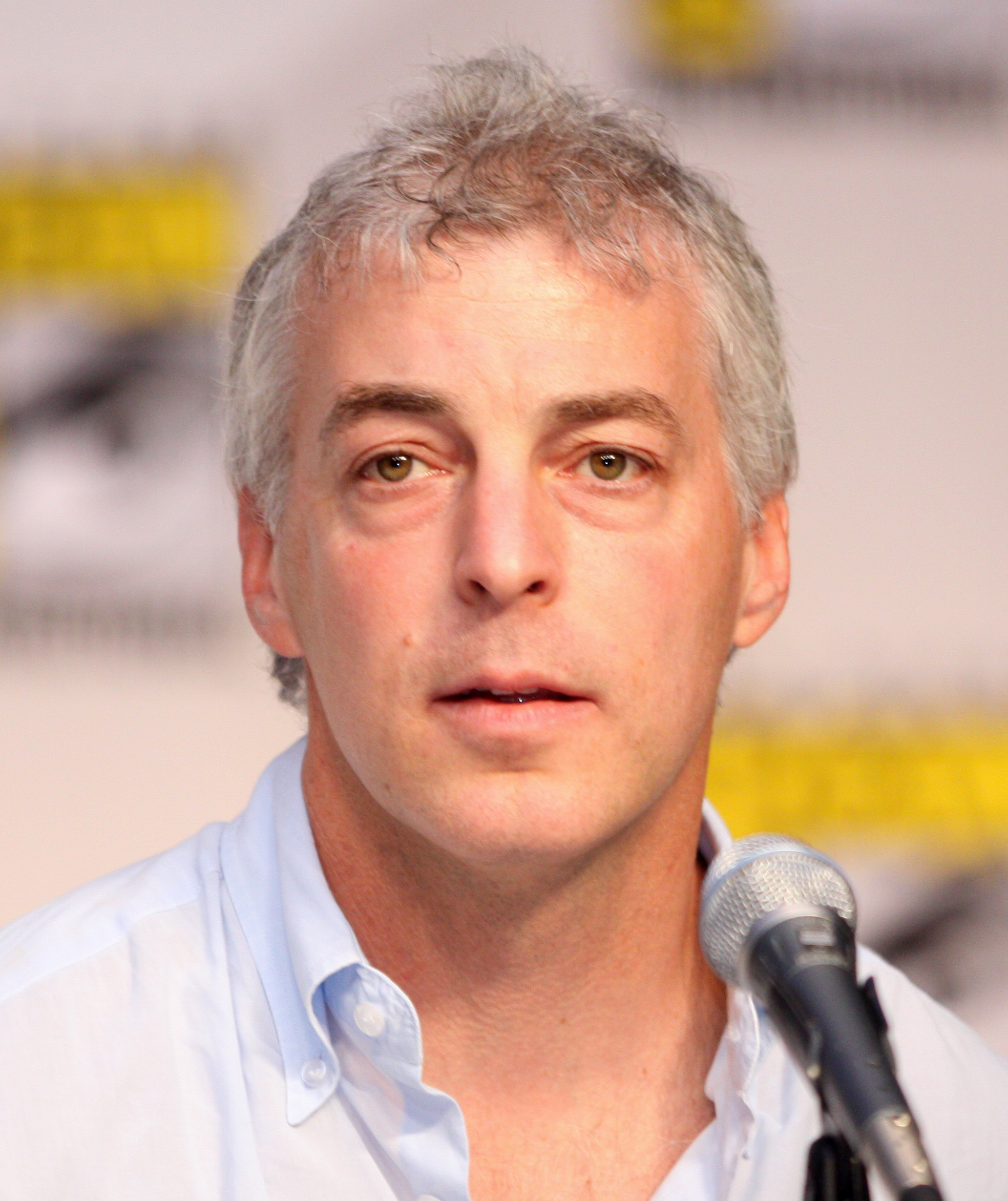
- Pinkner at San Diego Comic-Con in July 2010.
- Other names: Jeffrey Pinkner
- Occupations: Writer, producer
- Years active: 1996–present

Jeff Pinkner is an American television and movie writer and producer.

== Early life and education ==
Born to a Jewish family, Pinkner graduated from Pikesville High School in Baltimore, Maryland in 1983, Northwestern University in 1987, and Harvard Law School in 1990.

== Career ==
He is known for his work on Alias where he served as executive producer. In 2006 and 2007, he worked as an executive producer and writer for the mystery series Lost. The Lost writing staff, including Pinkner, were nominated for the Writers Guild of America (WGA) Award for Best Dramatic Series at the February 2007 ceremony for their work on the second and third seasons of Lost. In 2010, he has an overall deal with Warner Bros. TV.

Pinkner wrote Columbia Pictures's The Amazing Spider-Man 2 script with Roberto Orci and Alex Kurtzman. The film starred Andrew Garfield and Emma Stone, and was directed by Marc Webb. It opened in the U.S. May 2014.

He frequently collaborates with a tightly knit group of film professionals which include J. J. Abrams, Damon Lindelof, Adam Horowitz, Alex Kurtzman, Roberto Orci, Edward Kitsis, Andre Nemec, Josh Appelbaum, and Bryan Burk.

=== Fringe ===
In 2008, Pinkner began developing the FOX science fiction series Fringe, along with co-creators Alex Kurtzman, J. J. Abrams and Roberto Orci. Pinkner served as co-showrunner, executive producer, and writer (titles he shared with J. H. Wyman) through the show's fourth season. After the conclusion of season four, Pinkner left the series. Episodes he contributed to include:

- "The Same Old Story" (01.02) (co-written by Orci, Abrams, and Kurtzman)
- "The Arrival" (01.04) (co-written by Abrams)
- "In Which We Meet Mr. Jones" (01.07) (co-written with Abrams)
- "Bound" (02.11) (co-written by Abrams, Orci, and Kurtzman)
- "The Road Not Taken" (01.19) (Pinkner and supervising producer J. R. Orci co-wrote the teleplay, based on a story by consulting producer Akiva Goldsman)
- "There's More Than One of Everything" (01.20) (Pinkner and Wyman co-wrote the teleplay, based on a story by Goldsman and executive producer Bryan Burk)
- "Night of Desirable Objects" (02.02) (co-written with Wyman)
- "August" (02.08) (co-written by Wyman)
- "Peter" (02.16) (Pinkner, Wyman, and supervising producer Josh Singer wrote the teleplay based on a story along with Goldsman)
- "Brown Betty" (02.20) (co-written with Goldsman and Wyman)
- "Over There (Part 1)" (02.22) (co-written by Wyman and Goldsman)
- "Over There (Part 2)" (02.23) (co-written by Goldsman and Wyman)
- "Olivia" (03.01) (co-written with Wyman)
- "Entrada" (03.08) (co-written by Wyman)
- "The Firefly" (03.10) (co-written with Wyman)
- "Subject 13" (03.15) (co-written with Goldsman and Wyman)
- "Stowaway" (03.17) (Danielle Dispaltro wrote the teleplay, based on a story from Pinkner, Wyman, and Goldsman)
- "Lysergic Acid Diethylamide" (03.19) (Pinkner and Wyman wrote a teleplay based on a story along with Goldsman)
- "The Day We Died" (03.22) (Pinkner and Wyman wrote a teleplay based on a story along with Goldsman)
- "Neither Here Nor There" (04.01) (Pinkner and Wyman wrote a teleplay based on a story along with Goldsman)
- "Subject 9" (04.04) (co-written with Goldsman and Wyman)
- "Making Angels" (04.11) (co-written by Wyman and Goldsman)
- "Nothing as It Seems" (04.16) (co-written with Goldsman)
- "Letters of Transit" (04.19) (co-written by Goldsman and Wyman)
- "Brave New World (Part 1)" (04.21) (co-written by Wyman and Goldsman)
- "Brave New World (Part 2)" (04.22) (co-written by Wyman and Goldsman)

== Filmography ==
Film writer

- The Amazing Spider-Man 2 (2014)
- The 5th Wave (2016)
- The Dark Tower (2017)
- Jumanji: Welcome to the Jungle (2017)
- Venom (2018)
- Jumanji: The Next Level (2019)
- Jumanji: Open World (2026)

Television

Year	Title	Writer	Executive Producer	Notes
1998	Ally McBeal	Yes		Episode "Once In A Lifetime"
1998–2000	Profiler	Yes		Episodes "The Monster Within", "Inheritance" and "Besieged"
1999	Ally	Yes		
1999–2000	Early Edition	Yes		Episodes "Blowing Up Is Hard to Do", "Fatal Edition, Part 1" and "Blind Faith"; Also story editor
2000	The $treet	Yes		Also co-producerEpisodes "Closet Cases" and "Miracle on Wall Street"
2001	The Beast	Yes		
2001–2006	Alias	Yes		Wrote 12 episodes; Also supervising producer and co-executive producer
2006–2007	Lost	Yes	Yes	Episodes "The Glass Ballerina", "Not in Portland", "The Man from Tallahassee" and "Catch-22"; Also executive consultant
2007–2008	October Road			Consulting producer
2008–2012	Fringe	Yes	Yes	Wrote 26 episodes
2015–2017	Zoo	Yes	Yes	Also co-creator; Episodes "First Blood", "Fight or Flight" and "That Great Big Hill of Hope"
2016	Transylvania		Yes	
2017	Salamander	Yes	Yes	
2017–2019	Knightfall		Yes	
2018	Everything Sucks!		Yes	
2018	Origin		Yes	
2019	Limetown		Yes	
2020	High Fidelity		Yes	
2021	Cowboy Bebop		Yes	
2022–Present	From	Yes	Yes	
2023–Present	Citadel		Yes	
2027	Scooby-Doo: Origins		Yes	
