= Peter Bishop =

Fictional character

- Fringe character
- First appearance: "Pilot" (episode 1.01)
- Last appearance: "An Enemy of Fate" (episode 5.13)
- Portrayed by: Joshua Jackson (Adult Peter); Quinn Lord (Young Peter); Chandler Canterbury (Young Peter)

In-universe information
- Occupation: FBI/DHS consultant Member of the Fringe Division Science Team
- Family: Parallel universe: Walter Bishop (father); Elizabeth Bishop (mother); Prime universe: Walter Bishop (adoptive father); Elizabeth Bishop (adoptive mother; deceased); Robert Bishop (grandfather; deceased)
- Spouses: Prime universe: Olivia Dunham
- Significant others: Prime universe: Alternate Olivia Dunham (believing she is Prime Olivia; prime timeline)
- Children: Parallel universe: Henry Dunham (son with the alternate Olivia Dunham; prime timeline; ceased to exist); Prime universe: Henrietta Bishop (daughter with Olivia Dunham; alternate and final timeline)

Peter Bishop is a fictional character of the Fox television series Fringe. He is portrayed by Joshua Jackson.

== Fictional character biography ==
Peter Bishop was born on September 18, 1978, in the alternate universe, to parents Walter Bishop, also known as "Walternate," and his wife Elizabeth Bishop. In 1985, Peter acquired an extremely rare and savage genetic disease. His father, a brilliant scientist (in both universes), worked around-the-clock to save him.

Revealed in the episode "Peter," the Walter Bishop of the prime-universe watched his own son, the prime-universe version of Peter, die because of the same disease. He would frequently watch the other Peter living in the alternate universe via a "trans-dimensional window," which could allow someone to view the Other Side. Eventually, Walter formulated a compound and opened a doorway into the other universe, with the intentions of saving the other Peter from death. However, the vial containing the compound shattered on his way over to the Other Side, so he was forced to kidnap Peter, bring him over to the prime-universe, cure him, and then return him. But, after curing Peter on our side, he and his wife could not find themselves able to return him, so they raised him as their own.

Though at first resistant to this, Peter later grew up oblivious to Walter's deception, apparently forgetting it happened. He repeatedly told Olivia Dunham that he was never fond of his father, and even recalled times when Walter experimented on him. It is implied that Walter did this to see how Peter's body reacted to moving between universes. In 1991, Walter's lab assistant, Dr. Carla Warren, was killed in a fire in his lab, and Walter was locked away inside St. Claire's Mental Institution. Peter later admits to have never visited Walter, and continued to grow up despising his father. His hatred towards Walter grew to the point that Peter took books belonging to Robert Bishop, Walter's father, and sold them for money, an action that affected Walter greatly when he discovered this in 2009.

Even with his genius I.Q. level of 190, and fluency in English, Arabic, Persian, Latin, Greek, Cantonese, Russian, and Spanish, Peter became a college drop-out with gambling debts, a jack-of-all-trades, and a master con artist. He falsified a chemistry degree from MIT and managed to publish a few papers before his con was discovered. The only time he spoke to his father during Walter's initial 17-year stay inside St. Claire's was when Walter phoned to tell him that Elizabeth had died in a car crash, though Peter later discovered that she actually committed suicide because of the guilt she carried from keeping him in this universe ("The Man From The Other Side.") Additionally, Peter has trouble with the mafia because he owes an undisclosed amount of money to "Big Eddie," a crime lord who had been hunting him for some time.

=== Season one ===
Peter was first seen setting up a business deal in Baghdad, Iraq, when he was blackmailed by Olivia Dunham to gain access to his father. Peter releases Walter from St. Claire's so he can develop a cure for Olivia's lover, John Scott, though John is discovered to be a traitor (it is revealed in episode 1x13, "The Transformation," that John was actually an undercover agent working with the National Security Agency, and his love for Olivia was real).

For the majority of the early episodes, Peter despises working with his father, and in episode 1x04, "The Arrival," he prepares to leave Boston for good. But, he comes in contact with The Observer known as "September," who appears to read Peter's mind. Following this incident, Peter realizes that "The Pattern" does actually exist, and vows to remain in Boston until he discovers the truth, becoming a civilian consultant for U.S. Department of Homeland Security, in the area of fringe science.

By the culmination of season one, Peter and Walter appear to have completely reconciled. Peter even builds his father a device that could repair his water-damaged records, in episode 1x19, "The Road Not Taken." By the first season finale, "There's More Than One of Everything," Walter reveals to Peter the existence of the alternate universe, without telling him that is where he was born. Peter plays a key role in stopping David Robert Jones from opening a door to the Other Side, to kill William Bell, by closing the hole shut while Jones' body is only halfway through, slicing him in half. By this time, Walter begins leaving Peter notes explaining where he has run off to, making Peter remark to Astrid Farnsworth, "our little boy has grown up," solidifying his newfound love for his father.

=== Season two ===
In the beginning of season two, "A New Day in the Old Town," Olivia returns to the prime-universe after a visit to William Bell in the other dimension. She is gravely wounded on her way back and not expected to survive. A devastated Peter goes to say goodbye before she is taken off life-support, and after he kisses her forehead, Olivia awakens from her coma and cryptically tells Peter, "na eínai kalýtero ánthropo apó ton patéra sou (tou)," Greek for "be a better man than your father." Olivia does not remember saying this, or her experience on the Other Side, but this phrase deeply affects Peter, who explains that his mother used to say it to him every night before he went to bed. By episode 2x04, "Momentum Deferred," Olivia remembers meeting Bell in the other dimension, and learning of an impending war between both universes, and that an army of "shape-shifters" from the other side is working undercover in the prime-universe.

Peter and Walter's reconciliation reaches its peak in episode 2x10, "Grey Matters". Thomas Jerome Newton, the leader of the shape-shifters, kidnaps Walter and forces him to reveal how he opened an inter-dimensional doorway in 1985. Peter risks everything to rescue Walter and is horrified at the thought of seeing him die. In the episode "Jacksonville", Walter reactivates Olivia's Cortexiphan abilities, allowing her to identify objects from the Other Side because of a distinctive "glimmer" they display. When she looks at Peter, he projects a "glimmer", making Olivia realize he came from the Other Side. Olivia promises Walter that she will not tell Peter the truth, feeling that some secrets are far too damaging to be revealed.

In the episode "The Man from the Other Side", Walter decides he has to tell Peter the truth, but, as he is about to explain, they are called in to investigate a case. They discover that Newton is attempting to bring something—or someone—from the other universe into our world. The sonic vibrations released from Newton's device would inevitably kill anyone from this universe. When Peter shuts down the device and only sustains a concussion, he discovers his true origins. While receiving treatment in the hospital, he confronts Walter and blames him for his adopted mother's suicide. At the end of the episode, Olivia notifies Walter that Peter has checked out of the hospital and is on the run to resume his isolated and nomadic pre-Fringe life. Despite attempts to track him down, Olivia is unable to locate him.

Peter travels to Washington state where he works with local police to solve a series of murders. He believes that Newton is responsible, but is proved wrong. However, Peter later finds Newton in his motel room, and is held at gunpoint. With Peter subdued, Newton calls out to "Mr. Secretary" (the man he pulled over from the Other Side), who is revealed to be his biological father, Walter (Walternate), from the other universe.

Peter agrees to accompany his biological father to his home universe, which is captured on security cameras and sent to Olivia and Walter, who are devastated by the loss. On the other side, Peter lies comatose for three days to acclimate to his old world and reunites with his biological mother. Later, Peter reviews schematics of a machine (called the "Wave Sink" Device), which could heal his home universe, that requires his help for operation, but he later learns from Olivia, who has crossed over with Walter to find him, that his biological father intends to use the machine to destroy his adopted world. The Observers anticipated this outcome and warned Walter years ago that Peter should not return home. After Peter's return to his home world, September gave Olivia a drawing of Peter in the machine with energy emanating from his eyes. In an effort to save his life and the Prime-Universe, Olivia confesses her love for Peter, and they kiss. With this new information, Peter voluntarily returns to his adopted world with his adopted father, unknowingly bringing the parallel-universe version of Olivia, while the Olivia from the Prime-Universe is held captive in the other side by Walternate.

=== Season three ===
After returning to his universe, Peter finds it difficult being able to accept Walter's reasons for kidnapping him. In 3x02, "The Box", Peter helps thwart a terrorist attack on a Boston train station; he discovers that the ultrasonic device used for the attack is part of the weapon Walternate showed him, making him realize there are pieces of it in this universe as well.

Peter also becomes romantically interested in "Fauxlivia" (the alternate Olivia), unaware that she is an impostor sent to manipulate him and Walter. Later in Season 3 in the episode "Entrada", Peter discovers the truth as prime-Olivia informs him of being trapped in the alternate Universe. After the prime universe Olivia returns, she tells Peter that her hopes of reuniting with him helped her to survive and come back, leaving Peter in a tricky situation regarding his feelings for Olivia. "Fauxlivia" returns to her home universe and finds herself six weeks pregnant, Walternate welcomes the news and offers his full support, though it seems he has an ulterior plans for the pregnancy and baby. Peter is unaware of the pregnancy or Walternate's plans.

In the episode "Marionette", prime-Olivia struggles with the thought that the man she loved could not realize Fauxlivia was an impostor. She angrily declares that she does not want to be with Peter anymore, claiming "she's [Fauxlivia] taken everything".

In the episode "6B" Peter and Olivia try to fix their relationship, but when they share a kiss, Olivia begins to see him glimmer and realizes she is afraid (as this ability is present when she is in a state of fear). She talks to him about it outside the bar opposite the apartment block they are investigating when she sees that the glow of the alternate universe can be seen emanating from the window of apartment 6B. Once the case is resolved, Olivia unexpectedly shows up at the Bishop's house with some whiskey to celebrate another catastrophe averted, talks to Peter, and tells him she wants to know how 'beautiful' she and Peter can be. This was in reference to his statement that any lingering thoughts he had of Fauxlivia were because he spent so much time dreaming of what it would be like to be in a relationship with Olivia and that it was, indeed, a beautiful thing. The two kiss and Olivia leads Peter upstairs, presumably to consummate their relationship.

In "The Firefly," September and The Observers resurface, hoping to correct a mistake he made 25 years prior. In the ensuing chase between them, Peter corners September on a rooftop and asks what will happen to him, if the "doomsday machine" will in fact destroy both him and this universe. However, September only cryptically states, "it must be difficult, being a father," before shooting him with his "air gun," knocking him unconscious. At the end of the episode, September and another Observer, December, watch the Bishop house, and reveal the reason why they orchestrated the day's events—to see if Walter is finally able to let Peter die, which he apparently is. "And, now we know," September remarks, "when the time comes, he will be willing to do it again".

In the episode "Bloodline" Peter's son is born to Fauxlivia, unknown to Peter.

Much of Peter's story arc throughout the third season revolves around the doomsday device. Peter and the science team discovered that our side had another weapon, with the pieces scattered all over the world, which was originally constructed by "The First People," the first human species on Earth. They realize that Fauxlivia's mission on our side was to locate the pieces of the machine, as Walternate's device on the other side was flawed and missing components. In "Reciprocity," the science team visits a Massive Dynamic bunker, where they have been constructing the machine. When Peter approaches it, the machine is triggered, and his nose begins to bleed. Following this, Peter decides to start killing all the remaining shapeshifters whose identities are on Fauxlivia's computer. When Walter finds out, he is worried the machine has begun to change Peter, "weaponizing" him.

In "6:02 AM EST," Walternate activates the weapon on his side, using the DNA of Peter and Fauxlivia's baby, Henry Dunham. Through quantum entanglement, the weapon on this side is also activated, and, according to Sam Weiss, becomes "frustrated," after Peter attempts to enter it in an effort to prevent the destruction of this universe. Using Olivia's telekinetic powers, the weapon's protective force field is dropped, and Peter manipulates it, in 3x21, "The Last Sam Weiss." Whilst inside the machine, Peter's consciousness is propelled 15 years through time, arriving in 2026, outside the completed One World Trade Center.

In "The Day We Died," the season three finale set in 2026, Peter, 47 years old and a leading member of a more militarized Fringe Division, is married to Olivia, who has taken Broyles' place as commanding officer. In this future, after Peter entered the machine, he destroyed the Other Side. However, both universes were inextricably linked, and by destroying one, it would only be a matter of time before the side remaining would also cease to exist.

After seeing Olivia dead after Walternate (who had escaped to our side before his world's destruction) killed her, he becomes depressed and an alcoholic. Walter creates a plan to bring Peter's mind from 2011 into his 2026 body, where he would witness the end of days, before returning him, with the hopes that the younger Peter would make a different choice, than destroying the Other Side, thus creating the "First People" mythos.

After the Peter from 2011 experiences life in 2026, he returns to 2011, and uses the machine to create a "bridge" between both worlds, where both Walters, and both Olivias, can hopefully forget their differences to save the multiverse. However, before he can fully explain their mission, Peter mysteriously disappears, and both sides forget about him entirely, but remain dedicated to saving their worlds. A conversation between September and December reveals they forgot about Peter because he "never existed," as he "fulfilled his purpose."

=== Season four ===
Because of Peter's "erasure" from existence, a new timeline develops, which while very similar to the original one, contains slight differences. Just as happened in the original timeline, Walter was locked away in St. Claire's Mental Hospital for seventeen years, until Olivia Dunham had him released in order to help her partner and lover John Scott. However, without Peter there, they were unable to save John's life. The Fringe Division of the prime-universe is still formed after this, but the characters all have subtle personality differences. Also, other events which Peter only had a slight hand in are erased entirely, such as the prime-universe version of Lincoln Lee's first meeting with the Fringe Division.

Olivia lives with the constant feeling that something is missing from her life, and joined Fringe Division because she believed it would help her find answers. As a result of this, she has a much colder personality, and maintains an openly hostile relationship with double, Fauxlivia. She also managed to kill her stepfather (whereas in the original timeline she only wounded him), and was adopted by Nina Sharp, who continues to be a maternal figure in her life.

Without Peter's presence, Walter has even less of a grip of reality, becoming agoraphobic, afraid to leave the lab, hypersensitive to germs that may or may not be there, and prone to destructive "episodes." In order to cope with this, he has Astrid examine crime scenes while wearing an ear-mounted microphone and video camera, while he watches. He also sets up a bed in the lab, with an FBI agent stationed outside whenever he sleeps. Olivia appears to have a calming effect on him, and their relationship is more gentle and crutch-like than in the original timeline.

In "Neither Here Nor There," September the Observer is instructed by his superior to erase all memories of Peter that still remain despite the timeline's change. While September constructs the necessary device, brief apparitions of Peter begin appearing to his former colleagues. However, they are so brief that most do not notice, with the exception of Walter, who becomes so terrified that he hides in his sensory deprivation tank. His colleagues do not believe him due to his fragile mental state. Once the device is constructed however, September decides not to activate it, and Walter sees a reflection of Peter in the screen of his television, causing him to panic. The "hallucinations" continue, and become auditory, with Peter pleading with Walter to help him. This pushes Walter to the brink, and Olivia finds him about to lobotomize himself as a result. It is at that point revealed that she has dreams of Peter, and the two agree to try to find him, though they don't know who he is or why he is appearing to them.

The situation comes to a head when a strange force appears to Olivia several times. They first think that it's another Cortexiphan child, but at the end of the episode, it is revealed to be Peter. He resurfaces (quite literally) in Reiden Lake, and is taken to the hospital, where, much to the confusion of the Fringe Division, he asks for Olivia and Walter, and reveals knowledge that no citizen should know.

After revealing his knowledge of the technology the new breed of shapeshifters are using, he is brought into the Fringe Division under heavy supervision. His presence is emotionally painful to Walter, who reveals that, in this timeline, Peter died when the ice broke after they crossed over from the other universe. While he seems to believe Peter's claims, he doesn't consider himself worthy of having his son returned. Though he briefly expresses joy and wonder at seeing Peter, he quickly states that he doesn't deserve it, and that Peter was never Walter's son, leaving Peter frustrated and heartbroken. His presence also confuses Olivia, who treats him as a stranger. However, time paradoxes have begun to form, apparently as a consequence of his return. After fixing the time paradoxes, Peter concludes that this timeline is not "his," not the one he knows with the people he knows, and he wants to go to the machine again, certain that it will take him back to "his own" timeline.

Lincoln Lee later asks him if he had a relationship in the original timeline with Olivia, as Lee wishes to pursue Olivia romantically, but does not want to insult Peter if he already has a relationship with her. Peter reassures him that "She's not (his) Olivia" and therefore he has no objection to Lee pursuing her. He even purchases Lee a new pair of glasses more stylish than his current one, in order to help him.

After making numerous requests, he is continually denied access to the machine and becomes increasingly desperate to return home. He confronts Walter and demands his help, but Walter emphatically refuses, as the previous time he tried to save a version of Peter, his wife committed suicide, and he lost his career and sanity. Out of options, Peter concludes that his best hope is Walternate. However, he is denied access to the newly created "bridge," but Olivia and Lincoln offer to help him cross over using Walter's portal, which in the new timeline was recovered by Massive Dynamic after it sank to the bottom of Reiden Lake after Walter originally crossed over. Olivia and Lincoln desire his help to gather intelligence on the alternate universe, especially regarding a new and dangerous form of human-shapeshifters, which they believe are under the direction of Walternate. Peter refuses, as he believes he is neutral in the conflict and helping them would make Walternate less likely to help him.

After crossing over, Lincoln and Peter make a failed attempt to gain access to Walternate and are captured by the alternate Fringe Division. However, en route to being interrogated, their driver receives a mysterious call and kills his fellow officer and attempts to frame them for the crime and execute them. However, they are able to overpower and kill him, with Lee leading the pursuing Fringe Division off on a chase as a diversion so Peter can escape. He visits his mother Elizabeth Bishop, and after convincing her of his identity, gains access to Walternate.

Walternate reveals that he has been aware of Peter's reappearance in the timeline as he has been monitoring the intelligence feeds from the Prime Universe. Peter accuses him of creating the new shapeshifters and asks for his help in returning home. Walternate summons his lead scientist Brandon and asks him for confirmation that Walternate created them. Brandon denies it and Walternate unexpectedly shocks him unconscious with a special device, revealing him as a shapeshifter. He explains to Peter that the shapeshifters have infiltrated his government, and that he has no reliable way of detecting them, as the device he used on Brandon is fatal to humans. He also reveals that he had nothing to do with the Fringe agent who attempted to kill Peter and Lincoln. He asks for Peter's help in assuring the Prime Universe that he is not responsible for the new shapeshifters and asking for their help, as he believes that Peter's neutrality in the conflict makes him trustworthy. He promises Peter that he will help him return home in return for his help dealing with the threat.

After Olivia begins having memories of Peter, he believes that he is psychically controlling her to become his Olivia, as she is susceptible to thoughts due to her Cortexiphan powers. He leaves her, saying it is for the best. However, after a meeting with September in which he learns that he is in his timeline after all, he joins her again and their relationship is rekindled.

== Personality ==
Peter has been described as a "sort of jack of all trades", and also as a "brilliant person" who possesses "a lot of his father's innate intelligence". He is often the first person to note how insane the proposed experiments sound and tries to find logical explanations often where there are none. When he is first introduced, Peter is callous and cold to Olivia, showing little concern for Agent Scott, but he grows to become more sympathetic as details of his unhappy and often traumatic childhood are revealed. He often maintains a sardonic, cynical demeanor, but has proven time and time again to have a heart of gold. In addition, he has become far more enthusiastic about the work Fringe Division does, and his thought process has realigned itself to suit that.

=== Relationships ===
Prior to the pilot, Peter did not have a close relationship with his father, Walter. As a result, Peter grew up turning his back on science, the career field of his father. While the relationship has had many ups and downs, Peter has grown to trust and admire Walter, and consider him to be his father.

In the prime timeline, Peter was in love with Olivia, but was unaware that he fathered a child with Fauxlivia, whom she named Henry, in the alternate universe. Subsequently, at the end of season 3, when Peter is removed from the timeline as though he had never existed beyond childhood, Henry, too, ceases to exist.

In the alternate timeline, Peter married Olivia and had a daughter, Henrietta "Etta" (female version of "Henry"). After being taken by the observers when they invaded and reunited after 21 years, she was killed by Captain Windmark in "The Bullet That Saved the World". However, after Walter created a new timeline erasing The Observers from the future Peter, Olivia and Etta seemingly live happily ever after.
