= An Enemy of Fate =

- Fringe episode
- Walter Bishop and Michael cross through into the wormhole to the future, thus removing the Observers from existence and themselves from the final timeline.
- Episode no.: Season 5 Episode 13
- Directed by: J. H. Wyman
- Written by: J. H. Wyman
- Production code: 3X7513
- Original air date: January 18, 2013

Guest appearances
- Michael Kopsa as Captain Windmark; Michael Cerveris as September; Shaun Smyth as Anil; Lance Reddick as Phillip Broyles

Episode chronology
← Previous "Liberty"	Next → —
- Fringe season 5

"An Enemy of Fate" is the series finale of the American Fox science fiction/drama television series Fringe. It is episode 13 of season 5 and the 100th episode overall. It aired, along with the penultimate episode, "Liberty", in the United States on January 18, 2013. The final two episodes were simulcast in the UK and Ireland on Sky1 and in Spain in Canal+.

It received mostly positive reviews from both critics and fans.

== Plot ==
September (Michael Cerveris), talking to December (Eugene Lipinski), implores him to help fix a key component of the device, an initiating reactor, to send Michael (Rowan Longworth) to the future, despite knowing this will erase September from time. September pleads for the same compassion that December, like the others of the original Observer team, developed for the humans. Later, September regroups with Fringe to explain the failing reactor and describe the function of the device: to create a wormhole, using the two Observer cylinders as stabilization points on either end, and the large electromagnet needed to launch the second cylinder into the future of 2167. Once the wormhole is stabilized by the red rocks from the mine, Michael would be sent through, to meet an agent to take him to the Norwegian scientist to stop the experiment that would be responsible for creating the Observers. As they discuss this, Olivia (Anna Torv) is still concerned as to why Michael willingly let himself be captured previously and believes him to have expected to be rescued. One additional part is revealed to be necessary to assure the magnet's operation: a synchroscope. Peter (Joshua Jackson) begins to dig through the amber in the lab to look for it.

Captain Windmark, having discovered Broyles' alliance with the Fringe team, interrogates him about the recovery of Michael from a secured facility, believing him to be "The Dove", a mole for the underground. Windmark leaves, and Broyles sets off to meet Fringe until he realizes that Windmark intended to follow him to the Fringe team, and keeps his pursuers distracted. Though he tries to elude them, Broyles ends up captured.

In looking through the amber, Peter finds a tape addressed to him in Walter's handwriting. The tape is a goodbye message from Walter to Peter recorded before they were frozen in amber, and alludes to an envelope that he will receive at some point; Walter in the present explains that he will be the one to travel with Michael into the future, having already inoculated himself in 2015 to do so, and they will be forced to live out their lives there to ensure that a paradox is not created and that the Observers are wiped out from the point of the original invasion in 2015. Walter and Peter share an emotional moment, Walter saying he appreciated every minute of the "stolen" time they have had, and calling Peter his "very favorite thing".

Olivia and Astrid go to get a new initiating reactor from December, but find him hanged and the reactor stolen by other Observer and Loyalist forces. September asserts that there's no technology in 2036 to create the reaction needed. Olivia looks to Michael to gain insight; he motions her to be quiet, during which Astrid comes up with the idea of using one of the Observer shipping lanes as their wormhole. They begin to make plans to take over one of these the next day, when they learn of Broyles' capture from Anil. They set to use many of the past Fringe biological materials to kill many of the Observers and Loyalist forces. They obtain the control cube needed to operate the shipping lane and rescue Broyles along the way.

Meanwhile, Astrid takes Walter to show Gene, the cow, ambered in motionless peace in the lab. Walter and Astrid share an emotional moment with the hope to wake up back in the lab drinking strawberry milkshakes after all this ends. Walter finally shows his appreciation to Astrid, saying she always knew how to soothe him and adds that her name is beautiful. After this, September reveals to Walter that he has taken the only spare dose of inoculation to take Michael into the future instead of Walter, having come to have feelings for Michael.

The Fringe team races ahead of the Observers to hijack the wormhole and launch one of the Observer Beacons through it. As they get ready for Michael, Windmark arrives and attempts to grab him. September, Peter, and Olivia fight Windmark. Windmark gains the upper hand, but Olivia, under emotional duress from fighting for her daughter Etta, activates her latent Cortexiphan powers. She draws power from the surrounding city, and Olivia psychokinetically smashes Windmark between two cars (this was only possible because Olivia dosed herself with Cortexiphan in order to save Michael, explaining why Michael allowed himself to be captured, as he knew she would need her Cortexiphan abilities to stop Windmark).

September races to take Michael to the wormhole but is shot and killed by a stray bullet. Walter realizes his fate, and decides to take Michael through the wormhole as Peter, Olivia, and Astrid look on. Before entering the wormhole, Walter looks back at Peter and Peter mouths "I love you, Dad" to Walter.

Time flashes back to 2015, where Peter, Olivia, and their young daughter Etta are enjoying a day in the park (as seen in "Transilience Thought Unifier Model-11" and throughout the season). The Observer invasion does not occur, and the family returns home. When Peter checks the mail, he finds an envelope addressed to him from W. Bishop, containing only a piece of paper with a drawn white tulip on it.

=== Continuity ===
Of the past Fringe cases that the team uses against the Observers, these include the nematode worms, the radioactive isotopes, the parasitic cold slug, anti-gravity osmium bullets, the hallucinogenic drug that simulates deadly butterflies, and the skin-growth toxin. These cases all occurred within the show's first three seasons, showing that they still occurred in some way in the timeline created by Peter being erased.

== Production ==
It's definitely the biggest season finale we've ever had, it's the most expensive... It's massive, really big. I wanted to go out like, “Wow, how did they do that?”

— Executive producer J.H. Wyman on the series finale.

"An Enemy of Fate" was written and directed by showrunner and executive producer J. H. Wyman. It marked his fourth writing credit of the season, and his 28th writing contribution for the entire series. It also marked his second directing credit, as he previously directed season four's "A Short Story About Love".

Filming of the episode took place from December 3–13, 2012. In an early January interview, series co-creator J. J. Abrams noted that although he had not seen the final cut of the finale, he believed its script was "[...] unbelievable. I think it will be incredibly emotional."

== Reception ==
=== Ratings ===
The combined showing of "Liberty" and "An Enemy of Fate" earned Fringe its highest ratings for the season, with 3.28 million viewers and a 1.1 rating for adults 18–49.

=== Reviews ===
Series finale received mostly positive reviews. Noel Murray of The A.V. Club gave the two-parter a collective grade of A−, stating that "typical of Fringe, it’s a mixed bag, with a little foot-dragging, followed by a bit of “wow,” and a not-so-surprising swell of emotion. And then: A final image so perfect and poignant that I think it's going to be pretty easy for Fringe fans to forgive some of the unevenness that precedes it." Ramsey Isler of IGN rated the last episode 8.6 out of 10, criticizing that some of the time travel elements were glossed over, but concluded the article by saying that " Fringe was never about answers. Fringe was always about questions, and the journey we go on to discover the answers. In that regard, this was the perfect way to conclude: one last mystery, from father to son."

"Before the season started, FRINGE showrunner J.H. Wyman said that when he was crafting this final year, as a television viewer himself, he felt “most importantly, I wanted to sit down and after I finish watching the [series] finale of my favorite show, I would want to feel like, that was an experience and I cannot believe that stuff is over. I can imagine where my characters going in the future.” I felt that when the episode was over. I wondered where Peter, Olivia, and Etta would go. What would their life be like sans Walter and Observers? Maybe one day we’ll find out."

— Marisa Roffman of Give Me My Remote on the series finale.

Tim Surette of TV.com gave the finale a positive review, saying that it was a "complete, satisfying, and bittersweet series finale. I wouldn't place either of these hours in my own Top 20 episodes, but given how this season was going and how Season 4 ended, the finale exceeded my expectations. It didn't have to be amazing to be successful, it just had to show respect to the fans."

Anthony Ocasio of Screen Rant stated that "the Fringe series finale managed to deliver a truly satisfying conclusion to those who followed the series from the beginning", while Jeff Jensen writing for Entertainment Weekly said that "the fifth season was 'stolen time', to use Walter’s words, a generously bestowed bonus period that gave us 13 more hours with a 'favorite thing'." Writing for The Huffington Post, Maureen Ryan said that she "knew better than to expect a finale that would truly hang together or satisfy on macro levels. The micro -- the interpersonal and the specific -- would have to suffice. And a number of moments like that (including Walter's joyous "That is cool!" as an Observer floated away) made me glad I stuck around for the finale".

The Hollywood Reporter emphasized that this "was the only way Fringe -- after five seasons, multiple universes and 100 episodes -- could end: a bittersweet footnote to a rollercoaster journey". Morgan Jeffrey of Digital Spy concluded his article by saying that "the nods to the past are sweet, but what any real Fringe fan wanted from these last episodes was a farewell to the characters we've come to love that feels emotionally satisfying - and on that level, this series finale more than delivers."
