= Fringe season 5 =

Fringe
- Season 5
- Region 1 DVD cover
- No. of episodes: 13

Release
- Original network: Fox
- Original release: September 28, 2012 – January 18, 2013

Season chronology
- ← Previous; Season 4

The fifth and final season of the American Fox science fiction television series Fringe premiered on September 28, 2012, and concluded on January 18, 2013. The series is produced by Bad Robot in association with Warner Bros. Television. The show was officially renewed for a 13-episode fifth season on April 26, 2012. The fifth season was released on DVD and Blu-ray in region 1 on May 7, 2013.

J. H. Wyman served as a sole showrunner during the last season, with four other writers: Alison Schapker, Graham Roland, David Fury and Kristin Cantrell. Lead actors Anna Torv, John Noble, Joshua Jackson, Jasika Nicole reprised their roles as Olivia Dunham, Walter Bishop, Peter Bishop, and Astrid Farnsworth, respectively. Previous series regulars Lance Reddick, Blair Brown and Seth Gabel returned as special guest stars.

This season takes place in 2036, the Observer-ruled dystopian future previously seen in Season 4's "Letters of Transit". The opening sequence for the season retains the one featured in "Letters of Transit", with terms including community, freedom, joy, imagination, individuality and free will.

The ninth episode of the season, "Black Blotter", serves as a "19th episode", showing hallucinations from Walter's drug trip. The hunt for the tapes which contain the plan to defeat the Observers, serve as the way to contain one story into one episode, thus creating a procedural side of storytelling.

The fifth season was received positively by television critics, earning 78 out of 100 on the aggregate review website Metacritic, indicating a "generally favorable" critical reception. Reviewers praised the conclusion of the story, with most critics lauding the final scene. They said that the finale satisfied hardcore fans, created a great integration of elements from previous seasons and made a natural conclusion for the characters.

== Cast ==
=== Main cast ===
- Anna Torv as Olivia Dunham
- Joshua Jackson as Peter Bishop
- Jasika Nicole as Astrid Farnsworth
- John Noble as Dr. Walter Bishop

=== Recurring cast ===
- Michael Kopsa as Captain Windmark
- Shaun Smyth as Anil
- Georgina Haig as Henrietta "Etta" Bishop
- Michael Cerveris as September/Donald
- Eugene Lipinski as December

=== Special guests ===
- Blair Brown as Nina Sharp
- Lance Reddick as Phillip Broyles
- Seth Gabel as Lincoln Lee

== Season summary ==
The fifth season takes place in 2036, 24 years after the conclusion of the fourth season; in 2012, with the information about Olivia's pregnancy. Numerous Observers from the 27th century, having made the Earth uninhabitable in their own time, traveled through time to take over the Earth from humanity, instituting a Purge to kill off a large fraction.

The remaining humans are tamed in an Orwellian manner by the Observers and their human Loyalist collaborating soldiers, though an underground resistance still eludes capture by the Observers. A common scene used through this season is one where Peter, Olivia, and their young daughter Etta are enjoying a picnic on the day of the Observers' arrival and conquering of the Earth in 2015; Etta goes missing in this scene during all the confusion and destruction.

Walter had been warned of this by September before the Observers' appearance and, with his help, devised a plan to defeat the Observers in the future, scattering key elements across various locations and leaving messages for the future on video tapes in his lab, which he then encased in amber to protect their discovery. September "partitioned" the plan in Walter's brain to make it impossible for anyone to retrieve without the use of a thought unifier, a piece of Observer technology.

Walter, Peter, Olivia, Astrid, and William Bell purposely ambered themselves soon afterward. They are recovered by Etta Bishop, revealed to be Peter and Olivia's adult child who had gone missing during the Observer invasion, and while a Fringe division member, also working with the underground along with Broyles.

Walter is soon captured by the lead Observer, Captain Windmark, who puts him under a vigorous memory scan that destroys Walter's memories of the plan, before he can be rescued. Despite this loss, the Fringe team consider clues left in the lab, and come across the tapes. They painstakingly recover each tape and follow its instructions, gathering the elements, including the (apparently) young Observer child first encountered in season 1 ("Inner Child"), later named Michael by his protectors. They find that an unseen man named Donald had helped to hide these elements with Walter.

Meanwhile, Olivia and Peter work with Etta and the underground to combat the Observers, but in one encounter, Windmark catches Etta and fatally wounds her; Etta counters by triggering an anti-matter device that wipes her and several other Observers and Loyalists out. Olivia is shocked for several days at the loss of her daughter, while Peter is enraged and, at one point, uses an Observer implant on himself in order to understand how the Observers work to enable him to get revenge on Windmark. This would have soon caused his brain to sacrifice areas dedicated to feelings and emotions in order to increase space for intellect and logic, which is what happened to the Observers originally - and would have been an irreversible process. Olivia finally manages to talk him out of it.

Michael proves difficult to communicate with, but after working with Nina Sharp at the cost of her life, they gain technology that can aid in communications. Michael reaches out to Walter, flooding his mind with memories, and revealing that the man Donald is really the Observer September. They are able to locate September, now more human due to his "biological reversion" by other Observers for aiding Fringe. September reveals the full extent of the plan: to use the parts to construct a time machine to send Michael forward in time to 2167 as to stop an experiment in human genetics that would lead to the creation of the Observers. September further reveals that Michael is his "son", grown in the future from his genetic material but had his maturation halted when it was discovered that his brain is different from other Observers' — capable of both superior intelligence and deep emotions. September helps Fringe to gather the remaining equipment, and reminding Walter that he will need to sacrifice himself for this plan.

As Captain Windmark and the Observers close in, Michael allows himself to be captured and taken to the high-security facility on Liberty Island; Olivia takes Cortexiphan to allow her to jump to the parallel universe, travel safely to the open Liberty Island there with the aid of her doppelganger Fauxlivia and her friend Lincoln Lee, and jump back in the same manner. Though Michael is recovered, September finds the core initiating reactor for the time machine is insufficient, and pleads with December to get a new one from the future. Though December does so, he is caught and killed by the Observers. Astrid has the idea of using the wormhole-based shipping lanes as their conduit to the future, and the plan is quickly altered for this. Peter learns of Walter's plan to sacrifice himself to take the child into the future, necessary to prevent a time paradox. September offers to take Michael instead, having come to appreciate his role as a father, but he is shot by a stray bullet as they set up the wormhole, while Olivia, enhanced by the Cortexiphan, uses the power to smash Windmark between two cars and kill him. Walter recognizes his fate, and after looking back to Peter and Olivia, takes Michael through.

Time flashes back to the 2015 picnic, and the invasion of the Observers never occurs. On returning home, Peter finds a letter from Walter, containing only a slip of paper with a drawn white tulip.

== Episodes ==
| No. overall | No. in season | Title | Directed by | Written by | Original release date | Prod. code | US viewers (millions) |
|---|---|---|---|---|---|---|---|
| 88 | 1 | "Transilience Thought Unifier Model-11" | Jeannot Szwarc; Miguel Sapochnik | J. H. Wyman | September 28, 2012 | 3X7501 | 3.12 |
In the year 2036, Walter notes that he and the Observer September created a plan to free humankind from the Observers' rule, but September fragmented Walter's memory to protect the information. Walter had Olivia retrieve a Thought-Unifier, a device to help restore these memories, but she disappeared. In the present, with the help of Peter, Astrid, and Etta, he frees Olivia from amber. While the others escape, Walter is captured by the Observers. Their Captain Windmark interrogates him for the plan, damaging Walter's mind by using a violent probing technique. Etta uses her Fringe credentials to break into the facility where Walter is held and free him. Afterwards, Windmark connects her to images of a young girl from Walter's mind. The Unifier activates to Walter's touch, but it does not find any memories. Etta suspects that the memories were destroyed, and the plan is lost for good.
| 89 | 2 | "In Absentia" | Jeannot Szwarc | J. H. Wyman & David Fury | October 5, 2012 | 3X7502 | 2.98 |
After Walter's mind has been damaged by Windmark's telepathic probe, the team secretly enters Walter's old Harvard lab to find the information they need to defeat the Observers. The lab, now in use as an Observer base, has been half-encased in amber. Seeing a video camera embedded in the amber, Walter suspects that he recorded the plan on it. They assemble a laser to cut out the camera. Since they need power from the science building, Etta interrogates a Loyalist guard, Manfretti, using an Observer device called an "Angel Device," which ages him several years. Olivia discovers and condemns this, and is able to convince Manfretti to cooperate. Peter and Etta, disguised as Loyalists, infiltrate the science building and activate the power. Etta allows Manfretti, who now plans to fight for the resistance, to flee. The Fringe team retrieves the camera. On the tape, Walter instructs the viewer to follow the instructions on a series of tapes he has hidden to implement the plan to defeat the Observers.
| 90 | 3 | "The Recordist" | Jeff T. Thomas | Graham Roland | October 12, 2012 | 3X7503 | 2.64 |
Another tape recovered from the partially ambered lab points to a forest in Pennsylvania. There, Walter, Peter, Olivia and Etta find a hidden camp of human outcasts displaying a mysterious skin infection. Their leader Edwin explains that the group has been recording history since the takeover by the Observers. Inspecting an abandoned mine mentioned on the tape, the team find a shaft, and in it, a corpse showing extreme signs of the skin infection. Walter determines that the condition is caused by the Observers' modification of the Earth's atmosphere; gases in the mine accelerated the process, calcifying the body. Edwin discovers that, sometime in the past, the Observers took away a man, identified only as "Donald," who had retrieved red-colored rocks from the mine for "a scientist from Boston." Walter begins to prepare a protective suit allowing them to recover more rocks. Etta is warned that Observers are on their way to capture the team. The only way to get the materials for the suit is to barter with another refugee camp. Edwin gives Peter and Olivia false directions to that camp while he enters the mine alone to recover the rocks. By the time Walter and Etta discover this, Edwin has brought enough rocks out, while he succumbed to the calcification. The Fringe team escapes with the mineral.
| 91 | 4 | "The Bullet That Saved the World" | David Straiton | Alison Schapker | October 26, 2012 | 3X7504 | 2.55 |
Peter buys Etta a necklace to replace the chain they used previously. Etta restrings the bullet from her old necklace onto the new chain, which Olivia learns is the same bullet that Walter used on her. Etta admits she took it from their home after her parents disappeared, but did not understand its significance. Walter and Astrid extract another tape for part of Walter's plan, describing the reversibility of particles. The necessary information is hidden in a subway station in Observer-controlled Manhattan. While being interrogated, a member of the Resistance reveals the existence of the lab at Harvard. Etta is alerted to this, and they re-amber the lab and hide before Loyalists arrive. Walter, Peter, Olivia, and Etta use a chemical from a past Fringe case to make the guards at a Manhattan checkpoint suffocate, diverting attention long enough to recover the package from the subway tunnel. It contains a long equation that Walter cannot immediately understand. Broyles arrives, and explains that Etta recruited him into the Resistance and taught him how to block his thoughts from the Observers. Soon Observers and Loyalists arrive, following a tracking device on the Fringe team's car. The team give the equation to Broyles and cover his escape before racing off to an abandoned warehouse. As the Observers and Loyalists move in, the group is split up, and Etta is shot by Windmark. Peter, Olivia, and Walter find Etta dying from the wound. She reveals that she has armed an anti-matter bomb, and dies after giving back the bullet necklace to Olivia. The group escapes, while the bomb kills many Observers and Loyalists.
| 92 | 5 | "An Origin Story" | P. J. Pesce | J. H. Wyman | November 2, 2012 | 3X7505 | 2.58 |
The Fringe team grieve over Etta's death. Meanwhile, the Observers receive a shipment from the future through a wormhole. The Resistance plans to destroy the next shipment; they have also captured an Observer. Peter interrogates him, trying to find out how to assemble a cube-shaped power source used by the Observers to initiate the shipments. The Observer does not cooperate, and the attempt to disrupt the shipment fails. Peter returns to the Observer and forcibly removes his implant, thereby killing him. He inserts the implant into his own neck to gain the same capabilities that the Observers have.
| 93 | 6 | "Through the Looking Glass and What Walter Found There" | Jon Cassar | David Fury | November 9, 2012 | 3X7506 | 2.47 |
Having retrieved another tape from amber, Walter follows its instructions to a half-derelict apartment building that contains the entrance to a pocket universe where the normal laws of physics do not apply. He encounters a man called Cecil who was trapped in the pocket universe when breaking into an apartment. Olivia, Peter and Astrid follow Walter. Together, the team find out that Walter and Donald hid a boy from a previous Fringe case in the pocket universe. The boy is no longer there, but they find a radio that was apparently left there for them. Observers and Loyalists pursuing Walter catch up with the Fringe team, and a fight ensues. Cecil is killed by an Observer. Peter's new Observer implant enables him to fight the Observers effectively. However, he does not tell the rest of the team about the implant.
| 94 | 7 | "Five-Twenty-Ten" | Eagle Egilsson | Graham Roland | November 16, 2012 | 3X7507 | 2.70 |
Another tape leads the Fringe team to the ruins of a lab where two Observer-made beacons (seen in a previous episode) are kept in William Bell's private storage, only accessible with Bell's handprint. The beacons can locate a point in space and time. Peter uses his new Observer-like abilities to find Bell's storage in the rubble; Nina Sharp, who now works for the Ministry of Science, provides them with an Observer device that evaporates the rubble, and Walter uses Bell's hand that he obtained in Letters of Transit to retrieve the beacons. Meanwhile, Peter's new abilities allow him to predict the movements of two of Windmark's lieutenants, enabling him to replace one lieutenant's briefcase with one that contains the toxin from the first Fringe case. The toxin is released at a meeting, killing at least three Observers. Olivia worries about Peter, who has started to change due to the Observer implant. She discovers his prediction of Windmark's trajectory, and he tells her about the implant and his plan to kill Windmark and thus avenge Etta.
| 95 | 8 | "The Human Kind" | Dennis Smith | Alison Schapker | December 7, 2012 | 3X7508 | 2.71 |
Walter and Astrid analyze an Observer implant to assess its effects on the human brain. They find that the implant greatly stimulates intellectual capacity but renders the individual unable to experience emotions. Meanwhile, Peter uses his Observer implant to predict Windmark's movements. He is confronted by Windmark, who has predicted his movements in turn. After a brief fight, Peter escapes and asks Walter to dress his wounds. Walter urges him to remove the implant, fearing that the changes to Peter's brain will otherwise become permanent. Peter refuses and explains that he wants to avenge Etta. Following the instructions on another tape, Olivia retrieves an industrial-size electromagnet from a junkyard. On her way back, she is tricked into stopping her truck and captured by two men who want to collect the reward for her. She manages to kill them and escape with the magnet. When Olivia urges Peter to remove the implant, telling him that emotion is what makes them human, he does so.
| 96 | 9 | "Black Blotter" | Tommy Gormley | Kristin Cantrell | December 14, 2012 | 3X7509 | 3.12 |
Walter resorts to taking LSD to remember the rest of his plan, however he faces a struggle with the demons of his past. Meanwhile, Olivia and Peter track down a radio transmission to an island, where a crucial part of the plan is being held.
| 97 | 10 | "Anomaly XB-6783746" | Jeffrey Hunt | David Fury | December 21, 2012 | 3X7510 | 3.02 |
The Fringe team try in vain to communicate with Michael, the Observer child. They turn to Nina Sharp, who takes them to a secret Massive Dynamic lab, where she tries to read Michael's thoughts using a mind-computer interface. It does not work, and Nina suggests using a second interface to allow Michael to read their thoughts. By the time they acquire it, Observers led by Captain Windmark have tracked Nina. When they find her in the lab, Windmark starts to probe her and explains that Michael is a genetic anomaly scheduled to be killed. Using the gun of a Loyalist, Nina kills herself to prevent her mind being read. When Olivia, Peter and Walter return to the lab, they find Nina's body and Michael, who survived by hiding in a secret compartment. They mourn their loss. Back at the Harvard lab, Walter establishes communication with Michael, first with and then without the devices. The team learn from him that Donald is September.
| 98 | 11 | "The Boy Must Live" | Paul Holahan | Graham Roland | January 11, 2013 | 3X7511 | 2.44 |
The Fringe team locate Donald/September and learn that he is Michael's biological father and hid him in the present time. The other Observers took Donald's implant away and reversed his genetic modifications, making him completely human. They want to kill Michael because they consider him a genetic anomaly: He is at least as intelligent as them, but he also has feelings. Donald explains that the genetic modifications that led to the creation of the Observers could be prevented if Michael was sent to 2167 as living proof that greater intelligence is possible to achieve without sacrificing emotions. The timeline would thus be changed; the invasion would never happen. Exactly that is the plan that was developed by Donald and Walter. Windmark travels to 2609. He asks his superior for permission to erase the Fringe team's interference from the timeline, but that is considered too risky. In 2036, Donald has been tracked down, and the team has split up. Donald secretly tells Walter that he, Walter, will have to sacrifice himself for the plan to work. Then Donald stays behind while the rest of the team travel to a monorail station and board a train, avoiding Loyalists searching for them. Michael, however, gets off the train and allows Loyalists led by Windmark to catch him.
| 99 | 12 | "Liberty" | P. J. Pesce | Alison Schapker | January 18, 2013 | 3X7512 | 3.28 |
Michael is taken to Windmark, who is unable to read his mind. While Michael is being examined, Broyles relays to the team that Michael is on Liberty Island, which is heavily fortified. On Olivia's suggestion, she is injected with Cortexiphan, allowing her to cross over to the parallel universe. She finds it unspoiled by an Observer invasion, and reunites with Lincoln Lee (Seth Gabel) and Fauxlivia, who run Fringe Division and are married. Olivia makes it to Liberty Island, crosses back over to rescue Michael, and returns to the parallel universe, where Lincoln and Fauxlivia stop a pursuing Observer. After leaving the island Olivia and Michael return to their universe. September builds a device that would enable Michael to travel forward to 2167, but turns to former colleague December for assistance when the initial attempt fails. Windmark learns that Broyles is relaying information to the team.
| 100 | 13 | "An Enemy of Fate" | J. H. Wyman | J. H. Wyman | January 18, 2013 | 3X7513 | 3.28 |
Learning the Observers and Loyalists are on to Broyles, the team step up their plans. Peter learns that someone will have to travel with the mute Michael to talk to the scientists who fathered the Observer technology, and Walter already planned to sacrifice himself. Later, September decides to take Walter's place. December is found dead in his apartment, since the Observers were on to him. As a backup plan, they have to intercept a wormhole shipment near the Observer headquarters, which would be guarded by Loyalists. Peter and Olivia unleash various biohazards (from past Fringe events as seen in the episodes "The Cure", "The Dreamscape", "Ability", "Snakehead", and "Os") into the building's ventilation, while also rescuing a captured Broyles. During a firefight to keep the Loyalists and Observers at bay, the resistance activate the wormhole to 2167. Windmark attempts to stop them, only to be crushed by two trucks before he could teleport out, caused by Olivia using her Cortexiphan powers. As September runs with Michael to the wormhole, September is shot and dies, leaving Walter to take the child. As a result of this, the timeline has been rewritten, where back in 2015, the Observer invasion never occurred. In the final scene, Peter opens an envelope addressed from his father, which contains only a piece of paper with a drawn white tulip on it.

== Production ==
=== Crew ===
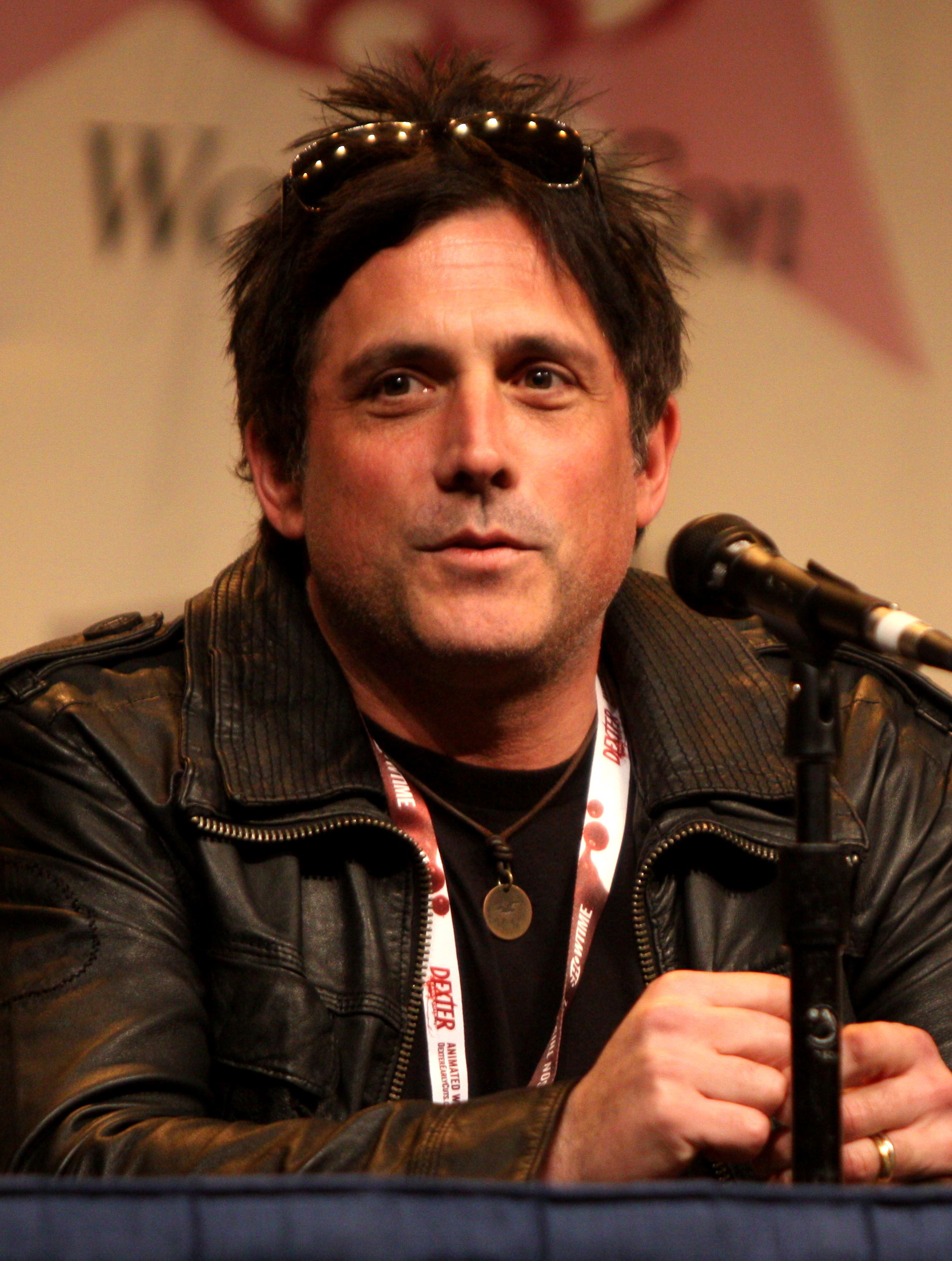
J. H. Wyman served as the sole showrunner in the last season after the departure of Jeff Pinkner.

In June 2012, it was announced that co-showrunner/executive producer Jeff Pinkner, who had been with the show since the second episode, would be departing. Pinkner's former co-showrunner, executive producer J. H. Wyman, serves as the sole showrunner during the final season. Series co-creators and former executive producers Alex Kurtzman and Roberto Orci, who have been credited as consulting producers since they left the series in the middle of the first season, are now no longer credited. Also, director/executive producer Joe Chappelle departed the series. Wyman announced that season five only was employing four writers, himself, Alison Schapker, Graham Roland, and David Fury. Later that number was revised to five, with script coordinator Kristin Cantrell scripting installment nine, "Black Blotter".

Before the start of the fifth season, J. H. Wyman stated that "another part of the challenge was to bring back things that you’ve forgotten about and maybe some things you haven’t forgotten about, recontextualize them and have the series make sense. That was really a very big part of what I was after, to make sure that [the viewers] would say, 'Oh, my gosh, I thought they forgot about that, but they didn’t.' There’s going to be a lot of that. There’s one, specifically, that’s going to be very impactful, I hope."

Anna Torv said that the opportunity to end the series properly is "a luxury that you don't always get. To be able to enjoy the last leg of what's turned into a marathon. Five years is a long time to spend with these characters. And we're making the most of it. The writers are excited to finish properly, without having to straddle the line of 'Could this be the end or not'?"

After Fringe was renewed for the fifth season, Jasika Nicole stated that she "was just really thankful we had four seasons. So when we found out that we did get a fifth season, it felt like it was such a gift to everybody who watched the show. This is what you get for being such genuine, sincere, consistent fans of this show. This is your payment. This is what you get for following us through different universes, different timelines, different characters, different timeslots. We were all over the place, and then I felt like the fifth season was a big thank-you to everybody who stuck with us for this long."

Joshua Jackson said that he was pleased with the way the story was concluded: "I feel like the entire fifth season has been the closing chapter of the Fringe story and that we were able to settle so much of the story along the way. With the finale, to put the finishing touches on Fringe and leave the characters in what feels like the right place, it all feels good right now. I think that Wyman wrote the perfect ending for Peter's story over all these years. His journey from prodigal son to dedicated father and husband is complete". John Noble stated that he "wasn't surprised by the general ending at all, actually. It seemed like there was only one way to end this story properly and beautifully."

Wyman admitted that "up until the very end, the very, very literal end, it didn't really come together until I think a week before I wrote it. I had a whole bunch of things and I'd change them. It's been a living breathing organism that's changed in so many ways."

=== Writing and filming ===
"We're so excited to begin work on a fifth season of Fringe and to be able to deliver the 13 final episodes to our passionate and devoted fans"

— Co-creator J. J. Abrams on season five

Filming of the season commenced on July 18, 2012. On July 24, 2012, production was temporarily halted as John Noble sought treatment for a sleep disorder, Blair Brown recuperated from a minor illness, and Jasika Nicole recovered from a minor car accident. Production resumed on August 7, 2012.

Wyman said that the season's ninth episode acted as the season's episode 19, which is known for departing from the status quo. The two-hour series finale aired on January 18, 2013, which Wyman wrote and directed.

Prop master Rob Smith, who had worked on the series since the second season, worked on creating futuristic gadgets to help create the 2036 setting. He explained, "It’s not like we’re gonna get the iPhone version 25. Basically what [we saw] is that reality has changed, and we live in a computer-dominated society. It was an interesting extrapolation of what we did in the past." He added, "There [weren't] any real rules, we [tried] to make it look as believable as we could, but nobody really knows what it’s gonna be like. And furthermore, the reality that we’re depicting probably won’t be what it’s like in 25 years… I hope."

=== Casting ===
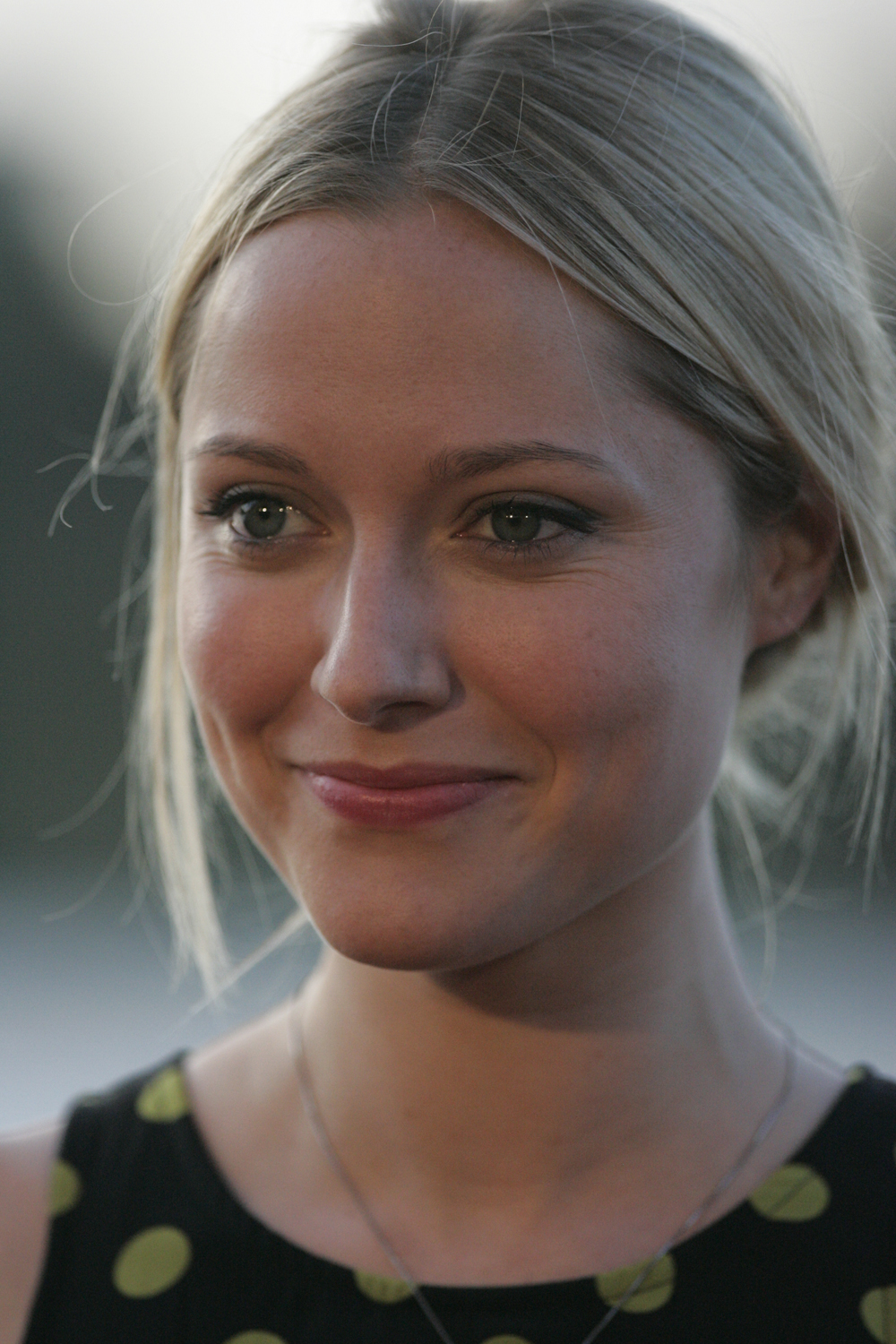
Georgina Haig played Henrietta Bishop, Peter and Olivia's daughter.

Seth Gabel, whose character, Lincoln Lee, had recurred in seasons two and three and then joined as a series regular in season four, does not return as a main cast member in season five, but he did reprise his role in the series finale. For the final season, Lance Reddick and Blair Brown are no longer credited among the main cast, and instead are credited under a "special appearance by" billing. Reddick and Brown each appeared in three episodes in the final season.

Major recurring characters in the fifth season include Michael Kopsa as Captain Windmark, the main antagonist of the season. Georgina Haig portrayed Henrietta "Etta" Bishop. She appeared in the first four episodes, and numerous times during the rest of the season in flashback or memories. Michael Cerveris reprised his role as a human version of September, Donald, in "Anomaly XB-6783746", "The Boy Must Live", "Liberty" and "An Enemy of Fate". Shaun Smith recurred as Anil, a member of Resistance.

Guest stars in the season include Eric Lange as Manfretti in the second episode, "In Absentia". Among the other guest actors were Paul McGillion as Edwin Massey ("The Recordist"), Zak Santiago as Cecil ("Through the Looking Glass and What Walter Found There"), Gabe Khouth as Dr. Darryl Hastings ("Five-Twenty-Ten" and "Anomaly XB-6783746"), Tom Butler as Richard, and James Kidnie as The Commander (last three episodes). Jenni Blong reprised her role as Dr. Carla Warren in "Black Blotter", after previously appearing in the second-season episode "Peter". Eugene Lipinski reprised his role as December the Observer in the final two episodes; he previously recurred in seasons two to four. Jill Scott played Simone, an intuitive and oracle-like woman, in "The Human Kind".

== Reception ==
=== Reviews ===
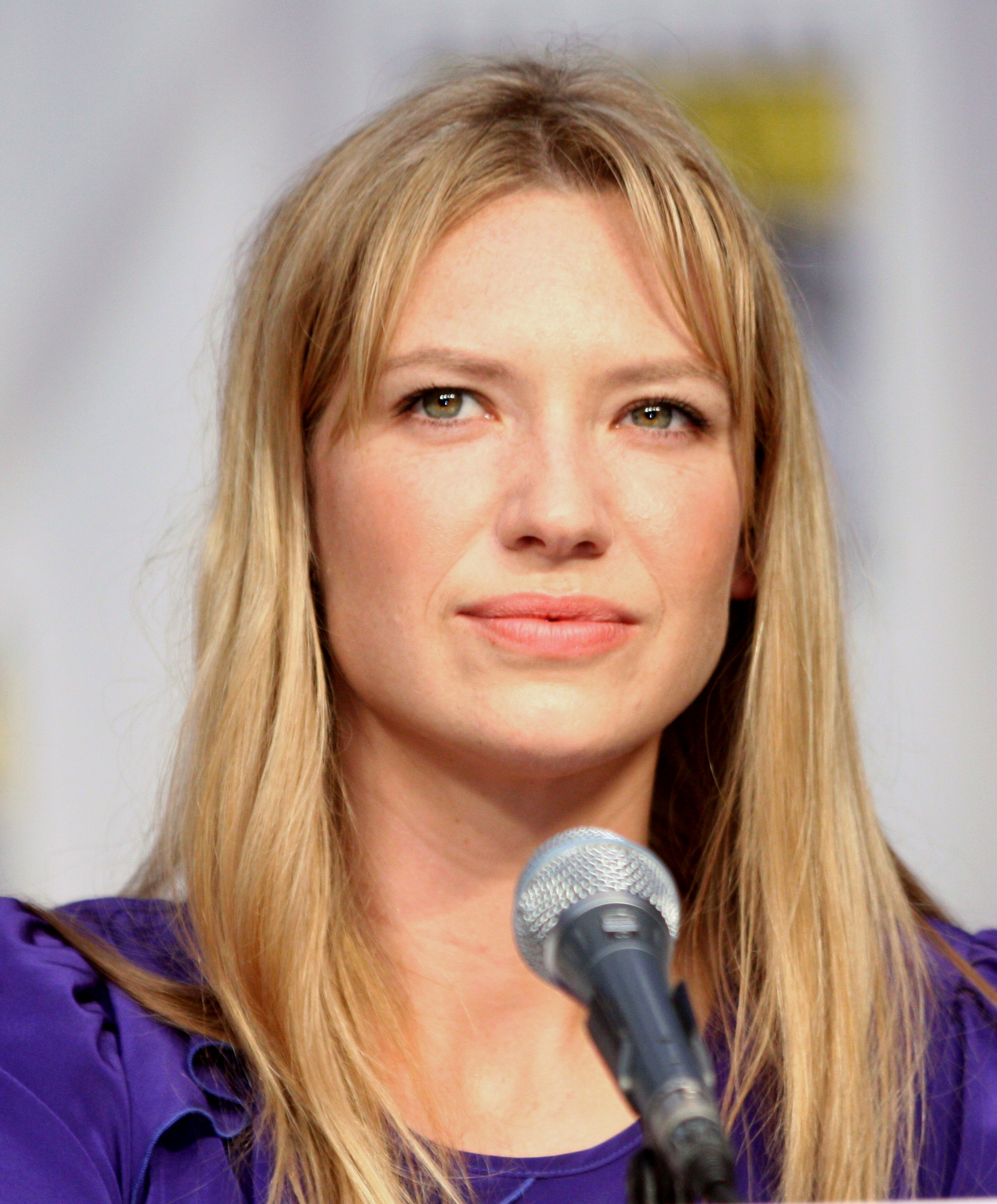
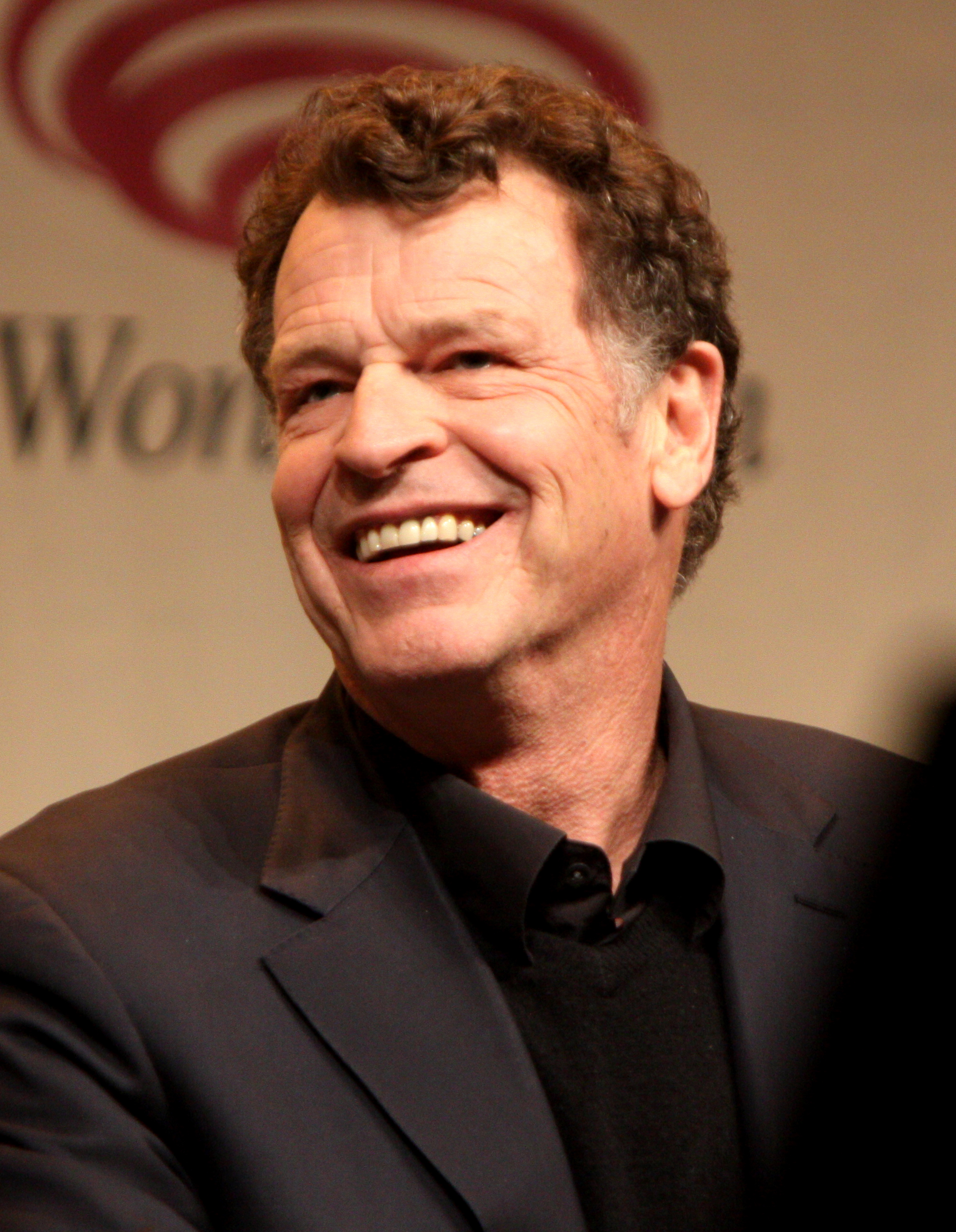
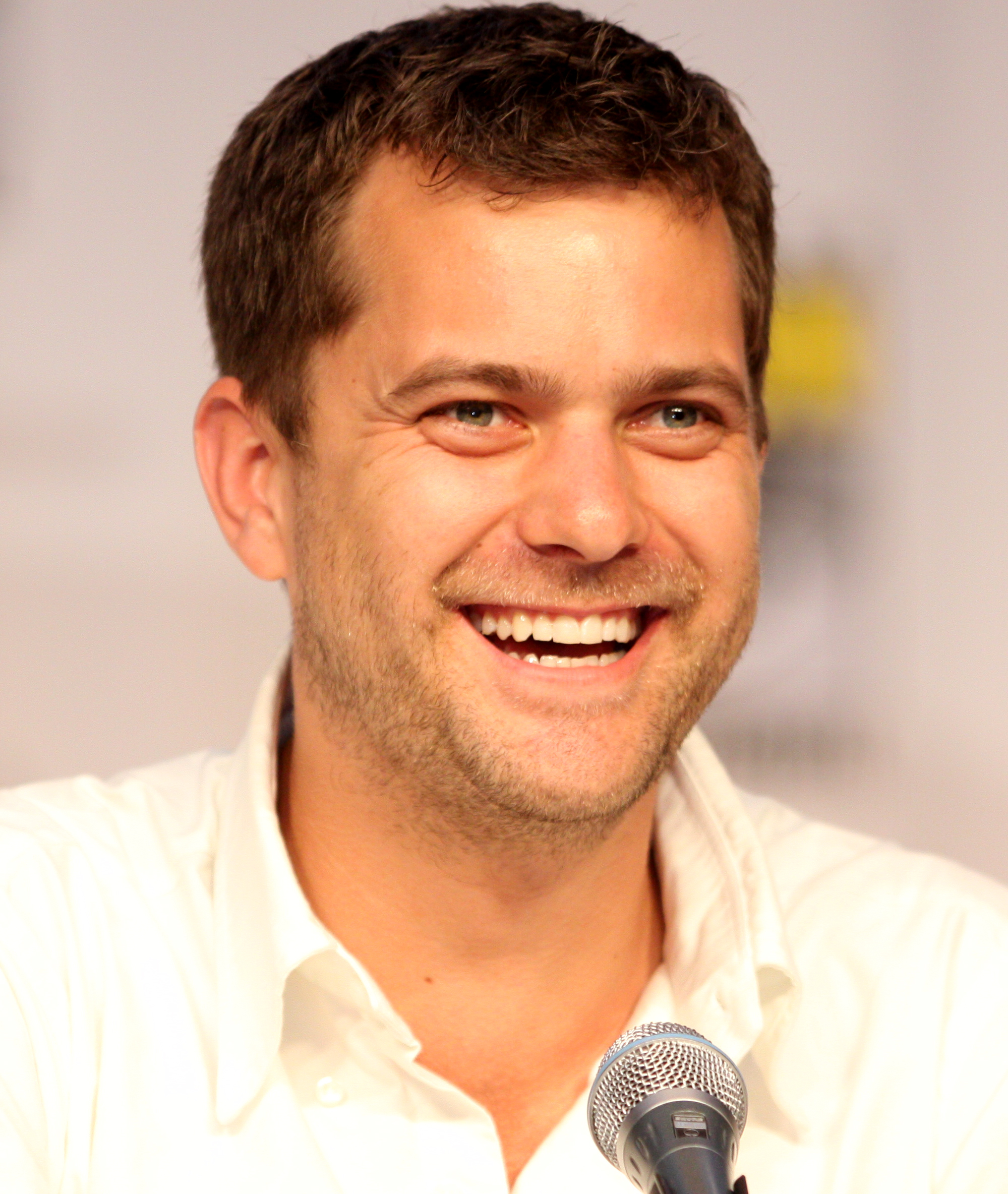
Anna Torv, John Noble and Joshua Jackson were praised multiple times over the last season for their performances.

"If you're the type of viewer that wants all of these things neatly tied up, or if you want your stories to be tightly plotted, or if you like story build-up to be resolved concretely, then this season was probably not very satisfying for you. But if those things don't matter to you, or if you were just more invested in the rich characters and their journey and finding out if they found the peace they deserved, or if you're okay with having ambiguous conclusions, then Season 5 was probably pretty damn good in your opinion. And really, at the end of the day, that's all that matters. Fringe may not have been a hit in the traditional sense, and certain story decisions may have alienated the masses. But this remarkable series did still find a devoted audience for the type of stories it wanted to tell, and that audience is quite happy. That's really all that any creators of fiction can hope for."

— Ramsey Isler of IGN on season five.

On Rotten Tomatoes, the season has an approval rating of 88% with an average score of 9 out of 10 based on 16 reviews. The website's critical consensus reads, "Fringe overcomes a compressed episode count and humbled production values to deliver a moving and rousing conclusion to its fans." Aggregate review site Metacritic gave the fifth season 78 out of 100 based on five critical reviews, indicating the "generally favorable" critical reception.

After watching the "Transilience Thought Unifier Model-11", Matt Roush of TV Guide wrote that "this endgame for one of TV's most adventurous sci-fi fables is staged as a battle for mankind's survival against the invading Observers, who've poisoned the environment and eradicated hope: "Nothing grows from scorched earth," one Observer remarks. Fringe has always grounded its bold and entertaining imaginative storytelling in deep emotional realities, and this is especially true as time-tripping Peter (Joshua Jackson) and Olivia (Anna Torv) reunite with their now-grown daughter Etta (Georgina Haig), a resistance leader, while continuing to fret over Walter". Mike Hale of The New York Times also stated that "no matter how drastic the swings between seasons, an overall consistency has been maintained, helped by the tight focus on a relatively small number of relationships. Most important, it’s (Fringe) continued to combine ambitious storytelling with pulpy, Saturday-matinee energy."

Chris Cabin of Slant Magazine criticized the final season saying that "as Fringe's ambitions have grown, the sense of real risk, danger, and punishment have diminished to close to nothing as the series nears what will likely be an inadequate conclusion". Writing for IGN, Ramsey Isler rated the fifth season with a score of 8 out of 10, stating that Fringe's final season was a hit with hardcore fans, and praising the great integration of elements from previous seasons and emotional moments that gave the characters even more depth.

Ken Tucker of Entertainment Weekly gave the whole series a very positive review, saying that "in the end, Fringe — which concluded with a back-to-back, two-episode wallop on Friday night — fulfilled nearly every promise it made to its audience over the course of five seasons. It remained true to its core values: the primacy of family, the sacredness of trust, the joy of a good joke, the exhilaration of intellectual inquiry, and the jolting power of love", and concluded with a thought: "This is the legacy of Fringe. (That, and a Gene forever preserved in amber.) Now it’s up to us to carry that into our futures, and to be on the look-out for whatever television (of any kind, in any genre) can pick up on Fringe‘s ever-reverberating vibe. Why? I quote Walter from the final hour and one last time: "Because it's cool."

=== Ratings and broadcast ===
Fringe remained in its Friday night slot during its fifth season. "Transilience Thought Unifier Model-11" aired in the United States on September 28, 2012. An estimated 3.2 million viewers watched the episode. It earned a ratings share of 1.1 among adults aged 18 to 49. The episode was up slightly from the previous season finale, but less than Fringe's fourth-season premiere rating of 1.5.

Fringe reached its lowest ratings ever with the episode "The Boy Must Live" which first aired in the United States on January 11, 2013, on Fox to an estimated 2.44 million viewers, and earned a ratings share of 0.8 among adults aged 18 to 49.

The two-part series finale, "Liberty" and "An Enemy of Fate" earned Fringe its highest rating of the season, with 3.2 million viewers and a 1.0 rating for adults 18–49.

=== Awards and nominations ===
Fringe received six nominations for the 39th Saturn Awards, including Best Network Television Series and nominations each for Anna Torv, Joshua Jackson and John Noble in the Best Actress, Actor and Supporting Actor categories respectively. Blair Brown and Lance Reddick have both been nominated for a Best Guest-Starring Role In a Series.
