= Black Blotter =

- Fringe episode
- In a hallucination by drugs, Walter imagines himself in a Terry Gilliam/Monty Python-inspired cartoon, here riding Gene the cow and seeing a frog (one of the Fringe glyphs), dog, and a seahorse (another of the Fringe glyphs).
- Episode no.: Season 5 Episode 9
- Directed by: Tommy Gormley
- Written by: Kristin Cantrell
- Production code: 3X7509
- Original air date: December 14, 2012

Guest appearances
- Blair Brown as Nina Sharp; Shaun Smyth as Anil; Jenni Blong as Dr. Carla Warren; Tom Butler as Richard; Maria Marlow as Carolyn

Episode chronology
← Previous "The Human Kind"	Next → "Anomaly XB-6783746"
- Fringe season 5

"Black Blotter" is the ninth episode of the fifth season of the Fox science-fiction/drama television series Fringe, and the show's 96th episode overall.

The episode was written by Kristin Cantrell and directed by Tommy Gormley.

== Plot ==
The radio previously collected by the Fringe team from the pocket universe ("Through the Looking Glass and What Walter Found There") starts to receive a strange signal, but when they look for Walter (John Noble) to decode it, they find that he has taken a dose of the hallucinatory drug "black blotter". Peter asks him why he took LSD. Walter explains that he was desperate to remember the plan and implies that he thought this would help, but that he did not know they would be getting a message on the radio. He then confesses to Peter that he asked Nina Sharp (Blair Brown) to remove the pieces of brain that they had to restore to repair his brain after being in amber for so long; he asked for this because he felt he was becoming like his much crueler old self.

As Walter suffers from visions of his old lab assistant, Carla Warren (Jenni Blong) and images relating to his first passage to the parallel universe (as seen in "Peter"), the rest of the team work with Anil (Shaun Smyth) to triangulate the signal from the radio. Peter (Joshua Jackson) and Olivia (Anna Torv) travel to the site in a nearby forest, and find the decades-old remains of Observers and members of the human resistance, including one with Sam Weiss's identification. The two recognize that Sam and his allies were defending a makeshift transmitter tower that was relaying the radio signal, and find where the signal is broadcasting from.

Walter is drawn by his hallucination of Carla to a spot in the lab where he had hidden a notebook containing many of his ideas, including the original design for the device to cross between universes. His vision of Carla claims that she died in a lab fire in trying to destroy the notebook. Nina Sharp appears in the hallucination and warns Walter not to read the notebook again.

Peter, Olivia, Walter, and Astrid (Jasika Nicole) travel to a boat dock across from the island site where the radio signal originates, briefly stalled by a Loyalist force. Upon the island, they find the signal coming from a house, where a couple, Richard (Tom Butler) and Carolyn (Maria Marlow), are staying along with the Observer child (as seen in "Inner Child") whom Walter had hidden in the pocket universe with help of the unknown person referred to as "Donald". Before they allow the group to approach, they demand a password that would have been encoded in the radio signal; Walter, through his drugged mind (we see a slightly surreal cutout animation in the style of Terry Gilliam of Monty Python), is able to assemble the password "black umbrella". The couple allow them in and prepare the child, whom they have named Michael, for traveling, and explain that they were former members of the Resistance forces; as they were ready to settle down, Donald left Michael with them for his protection, and as per his instructions, they activated the radio signal every five days.

The Fringe team returns with Michael back to the lab. Olivia discovers that Michael still remembers her, despite having only met in the original timeline. Walter, still in his drug-addled state, reminisces about the damage that his more sinister side had done, and decides to burn the notebook. However, his hallucination of Carla warns that he has already done the damage, having recalled what he was capable of; when he next looks up, he finds he is looking at himself, a grim smile on his face. Walter snaps alert, finding no notebook and the lab empty.

== Production ==
"Black Blotter" was written by Kristin Cantrell, marking her first writing credit for the series; she previously served as a script coordinator. It was directed by Tommy Gormley, making his first solo directing credit. He served as first assistant director on several of Fringe co-creator J. J. Abrams' projects, including Star Trek and Super 8.

Within the episode is a 75-second animation in the style of Terry Gilliam's animated sequences for Monty Python, representing part of Walter's drug-induced memory. The animation was produced by 6 Point Harness over a two-week period, working the various idiosyncrasies of Gilliam's animations into this sequence. Elements such as a giant foot crushing the characters are a direct homage to the same elements used in Gilliam's animation for the Monty Python title sequences.

== Reception ==
=== Ratings ===
"Black Blotter" first aired in the United States on December 14, 2012, on Fox. An estimated 3.13 million viewers watched the episode, and earned a ratings share of 1.1 among adults aged 18 to 49, to become the highest rated episode of the season to date. 1.43 million viewers watched the episode through DVR and garnered a 0.6 rating, totaling 4.55 million viewers and a 1.7 rating.

=== Reviews ===
"Black Blotter" has been compared to the "19th episode" of earlier seasons - "Brown Betty" from Season 2, "Lysergic Acid Diethylamide" from Season 3, and "Letters of Transit" from Season 4 - where the producers have provided a strange, out-of-context episode that does not follow the usual narrative and direction of most other Fringe episodes The episode received positive reviews, with Noel Murray of The A.V. Club awarding the episode an "A−" grade, and IGN's Ramsey Isler rating the episode a 7.5 out of 10. Jeff Jensen of Entertainment Weekly named "Black Blotter" the nineteenth best episode of the series, stating "Walter Bishop's most epic LSD trip ever — an attempt to recover lost memories of his master plan to defeat the Observers — allowed Fringe to creatively cut loose with some novel storytelling devices, none more inspired than a cartoon romp rendered in the style of Terry Gilliam's stop-motion Monty Python animation."
