= Tom Gormley =

Tom Gormley may refer to:

- Tom Gormley (politician) (1916–1984), politician in Northern Ireland
- Tom Gormley (American football) (1891–1951), professional football player
- Tommy Gormley (born 1968), Scottish film director and producer
