= Anomaly XB-6783746 =

- Fringe episode
- Episode no.: Season 5 Episode 10
- Directed by: Jeffrey Hunt
- Written by: David Fury
- Production code: 3X7510
- Original air date: December 21, 2012

Guest appearances
- Michael Cerveris as September/Donald; Michael Kopsa as Captain Windmark; Blair Brown as Nina Sharp; Gabe Khouth as Dr. Darryl Hastings

Episode chronology
← Previous "Black Blotter"	Next → "The Boy Must Live"
- Fringe season 5

"Anomaly XB-6783746" is the tenth episode of the fifth season of the Fox science-fiction/drama television series Fringe, and the show's 97th episode overall.

The episode was written by David Fury and directed by Jeffrey Hunt.

== Plot ==
After finding that the Observer child Michael lacks any implant that the other Observers have, the Fringe team try to communicate with him to learn any more about September's plan or the identity of the person they know as "Donald", but they find it difficult to make any connection. Olivia contacts Nina Sharp discreetly, asking for her help; she promises to meet them away from the Ministry of Science. There, Nina takes them to a "black lab" left over from Massive Dynamic, where they were studying Observers. Nina attempts to use a mind-computer interface device to read Michael's thoughts but the software cannot cope with Michael's mind. However, she suggests using a second interface to allow Michael to read their thoughts and then reply, but this would require another of the interface devices, held at a storage facility at the Ministry of Science. Olivia, Peter, and Walter leave Michael with Nina at the lab while they go to recover the device.

Meanwhile, Captain Windmark of the Observers is alerted to Nina's absence, and uses Observer technology to read the sound waves from Olivia's call to overhear the words "child Observer". When Nina does not return, they turn to the storage facility where the sublimation device, previously used by Fringe to access an old laboratory ("Five-Twenty-Ten"), had been taken from, and start probing all the workers there, including Dr. Hastings (Gabe Khouth), who had helped the Fringe team earlier. The Fringe team arrives and recovers the devices just as Dr. Hastings is being probed, and along with a trace on Nina's phone, the Fringe team realize that Nina and the black lab have been compromised, and warn her as they race back.

Nina talks to Michael about hiding him, and he touches her momentarily before letting her lead him to safety. When Windmark and the Observers arrive, they find Nina waiting for them. Windmark starts to probe her, and explains that the child is really just an anomaly, XB-6783746, from the Observer's time in the future that was to be destroyed before he was taken. Windmark considers the humans to be animals to have experimented on the Observer bodies in the lab. Nina retorts that though the Observers may treat humans as animals, that the Observers have developed involuntary habits that humans have since evolved past. Windmark orders the Loyalist agents to restrain her for him to run a deeper probe, but she grabs one of their guns and kills herself.

By the time Olivia, Peter, and Walter have returned, the lab has been ransacked, and Nina's body remains. Olivia and Walter mourn their loss while Peter notes from security footage that she killed herself to prevent her mind being read. They realize that Windmark left without the child, and they find Michael hiding in a secret compartment. Michael sees Nina's body and sheds a tear.

Back at the Harvard lab, Walter attempts to connect with Michael with the devices. After an initial success, Michael takes off his device, walks to Walter, and puts his hand on Walter's face, as he had previously done to Nina. Walter experiences a sudden surge of memories, including those from the previous timeline, culminating in an image of a middle-aged man, and a re-iteration of September's warning to Walter, "The boy must live" ("Peter"). When Walter recovers, he reveals what Michael has shown him: that the "Donald" they have been looking for is really September, the Observer.

== Production ==
"Anomaly XB-6783746" was written by co-executive producer David Fury, marking his third writing of the season. Fury wrote a total of seven episodes while on the writing staff for the final two seasons. It was directed by Jeffrey Hunt, who directed four episodes for the series, including season four's "The End of All Things", which Fury also wrote.

== Reception ==
=== Ratings ===
"Anomaly XB-6783746" first aired in the United States on December 21, 2012 on Fox. An estimated 3.02 million viewers watched the episode, and earned a ratings share of 1.0 among adults aged 18 to 49, slightly down in viewership from the previous episode.

=== Reviews ===
IGN's Ramsey Isler rated the episode 8.3 out of 10, saying the inclusion of Nina Sharp was the strongest part of the episode, noting she "steals the show". Isler highly enjoyed her final scene, saying it was "truly the best part of the episode". He also said he liked that the mysteries are finally starting to get answers, but felt the early parts of the episode were dragged out. Noel Murray of The A.V. Club felt the episode followed the pattern of much of the episodes this season, with a slow beginning, but a strong ending. He noted the final act was "full of action, revelations, stylistic filigree, and rich emotion." He ultimately gave the episode a "B+" grade.
