= In Absentia (Fringe) =

- Fringe episode
- Episode no.: Season 5 Episode 2
- Directed by: Jeannot Szwarc
- Written by: J. H. Wyman; David Fury
- Production code: 3X7502
- Original air date: October 5, 2012

Guest appearances
- Georgina Haig as Henrietta "Etta" Bishop; Eric Lange as Gael Manfretti

Episode chronology
← Previous "Transilience Thought Unifier Model-11"	Next → "The Recordist"
- Fringe season 5

"In Absentia" is the second episode of the fifth and final season of the American Fox science fiction/drama television series Fringe, and the show's 89th episode overall. The episode aired in the United States on October 5, 2012.

It was co-written by J.H. Wyman and David Fury, while being directed by Jeannot Szwarc.

== Plot ==
Walter (John Noble) attempts to use the Transilience-Thought Unifier to relocate the fragmented plan to defeat the Observers within his brain, but fails to do anything productive. Olivia (Anna Torv), reminded of Walter's past, contemplates whether he may have written the plan down. The Fringe team considers breaking into Walter's old lab at Harvard, which has been taken over as an Observer base. Using old service tunnels to avoid detection, they arrive at the lab, finding half of it encased in amber. Walter spots a video camera embedded at the epicenter of the amber encasement, and suspects that he has recorded the plan on it. They work to assemble a laser to cut out the camera from spare lab parts, but know they will likely need power from the science building.

Etta (Georgina Haig) captures a passing human Loyalist guard, Gael Manfretti (Eric Lange), before they are detected, and offers to interrogate him in the back office to get intel on the science building. In private, she uses an Observer device called an "Angel Device," which was co-opted by the human resistance groups. When Manfretti refuses to give up information, the device ages him several years. Olivia discovers and condemns this, and while Etta takes a break, is able to convince Manfretti, who believes that he will not survive, to cooperate after agreeing to tell his son his fate. Manfretti explains about the access codes to the science building that requires an optical scan, but Etta's torture has caused him to age so much that his presence would arouse suspicion. Walter is able to transfer Manfretti's iris patterns to old pig eyes, and Peter (Joshua Jackson) and Etta, disguised as human Loyalists, infiltrate the building. As they go to activate the power, they pass several labs where the Observers are performing experiments on humans, including keeping Etta's former partner Simon's severed head alive. Peter stops Etta from making a scene before they can complete the mission. They successfully restore the power and return to the lab. Meanwhile, Olivia talks to Manfretti and learns that Loyalists like himself believe that their world would be better if they simply gave in to the Observers, himself having volunteered to protect his family.

As Walter and Astrid (Jasika Nicole) start to free the camera with the laser, Etta prepares to transport Manfretti to her resistance group, assuring Olivia that the guard was lying to get her sympathy. Before he is taken away, Manfretti passes Olivia an address. Instead of taking him to the Resistance base, Etta takes Manfretti to the countryside, and after confirming that he was lying about having a son, allows him to run. Before he flees, Manfretti notes he now plans to fight for the resistance, having seen the hope and determination in Olivia's eyes; Etta also said that her change of heart was from seeing pity for the world from Olivia.

Back at Harvard, the Fringe team successfully retrieves the camera and watches the tape. On it, Walter has instructed the viewer to find and follow the instructions on a series of tapes he has hidden to reveal the plan to rid the world of the Observers, before he ambers the lab.

== Production ==
"In Absentia" was co-written by co-executive producer David Fury and executive producer J.H. Wyman, while being directed by Smallville veteran Jeannot Szwarc.

== Reception ==
=== Ratings ===
"In Absentia" first aired in the United States on October 5, 2012. An estimated 2.98 million viewers watched the episode, and earned a ratings share of 1.0 among adults aged 18 to 49, to rank third in its timeslot. The episode was down in viewership from the previous episode.

=== Reviews ===
Ramsey Isler of IGN gave the episode a highly positive review, noting the episode had strong themes and great character moments. He awarded the episode an 8.6 out of 10. The A.V. Club's Noel Murray also gave it positive review, by giving it an "A−" grade. He noted the episode gave a clear indication of what the final season will be, and enjoyed the episodic strengths of the episode among the serialized storylines of the season.
