= The Bullet That Saved the World =

- Fringe episode
- Episode no.: Season 5 Episode 4
- Directed by: David Straiton
- Written by: Alison Schapker
- Production code: 3X7504
- Original air date: October 26, 2012

Guest appearances
- Georgina Haig as Henrietta "Etta" Bishop; Michael Kopsa as Captain Windmark; Lance Reddick as Phillip Broyles

Episode chronology
← Previous "The Recordist"	Next → "An Origin Story"
- Fringe season 5

"The Bullet That Saved the World" is the fourth episode of the fifth season of the Fox science fiction/drama television series Fringe, and the 91st episode overall.

The episode was written by Alison Schapker and directed by David Straiton.

== Plot ==
While Peter (Joshua Jackson) is out collecting gas, he stops in a pawn shop, looking for a necklace to replace the chain they had to use previously from Etta's (Georgina Haig) old necklace. He encounters an Observer who attempts to read his mind, and though Peter employs Etta's advice to mask his thoughts, the Observer does obtain an image of Etta; Peter leaves quickly before he is caught by other Observers and Loyalist forces. Lead Observer Captain Windmark (Michael Kopsa) brings in Phillip Broyles (Lance Reddick), warning him of a possible leak in the Loyalist forces, and then considers why Peter purchased the necklace from the shop. Meanwhile, at the lab, Etta restrings the bullet from her old necklace onto the new chain, which Olivia (Anna Torv) learns is the very same one she kept and that Peter had called "the bullet that saved the world" (as seen in "Brave New World"). Etta admits she took it from their home after her parents disappeared, but otherwise did not understand its significance.

Walter (John Noble) and Astrid (Jasika Nicole) extract another tape for part of Walter's plan, describing the reversibility of particles. The location of the necessary information is lost on a torn part of the tape, but Walter recognizes the story his past self was telling, pointing to a subway station deep inside Observer-controlled Manhattan. Entering Manhattan through the Observer and Loyalist checkpoints would be impossible, but Walter directs them to a secret basement below his lab where he had stored elements from all the past Fringe cases. They look for some way of creating a distraction from these elements.

The suspected Resistance mole is interrogated by an Observer; in addition to revealing the name "The Dove" as an unknown entity that set him up in the Loyalist forces, the mole reveals the existence of the lab at Harvard. Etta is alerted to this by an unknown agent, and they are able to re-amber the lab and hide in time before Loyalist forces arrive; to them, the lab remains as if it were still abandoned. Windmark considers that if Etta is able to hide her thoughts from the Observers, perhaps others can.

Walter, Peter, Olivia, and Etta use a chemical developed by David Robert Jones that causes scar tissue to form over facial orifices (as seen in "Ability") which cause the guards at the checkpoint to suffocate, diverting attention long enough to recover the package from the subway tunnel. Once safe, they find the package contains an extremely complex physics equation that Walter cannot understand or decipher. As they review it, Broyles arrives, reunites with his former team, and explains how he was recruited into the Resistance after seeing and recognising Olivia in Etta and learning from her how to block his thoughts from the Observers. Broyles helps to arm them, but they soon find Observers and Loyalists converging on them, following a previously placed tracking device on their car. They give the equation to Broyles and cover his escape before racing off to an abandoned warehouse. As the Observers and Loyalists move in, the group is split up, and Etta is cornered by Windmark. Windmark interrogates Etta to try to understand why Peter gave her the necklace, and determines it's due to love. He then shoots her in the chest.

Peter, Olivia, and Walter regroup and find Etta, dying from the wound. Peter and Olivia try to convince Etta to let them take her out, but she reveals that she has armed an anti-matter device, and dies shortly after returning the bullet necklace to Olivia. The group escapes, while the anti-matter device wipes out many Observers and Loyalist forces (though Windmark manages to escape). They take a moment to mourn their daughter so soon after they were reunited with her.

== Production ==
"The Bullet That Saved the World" was written by co-executive producer Alison Schapker, and directed by House veteran David Straiton.

The episode's title is a reference to the phrase and concept "The shot heard round the world".

Actor Lance Reddick appears in the episode as a special guest, after being a series regular since the pilot.

== Reception ==
=== Ratings ===
"The Bullet That Saved the World" first aired in the United States on October 26, 2012 on Fox. An estimated 2.55 million viewers watched the episode, and earned a ratings share of 0.9 among adults aged 18 to 49, to rank fourth in its timeslot. The episode continued the trend of a decrease in viewership by episode.

=== Reviews ===
Entertainment Weekly's Jeff Jensen praised the episode, saying, "It was an armor-piercing round of emotional storytelling, a heartbreaker." He also proffered the opinion that Etta's death was a necessary loss, in order to become more emotionally involved with the season. Noel Murray of The A.V. Club also liked the installment, giving it an A−. He enjoyed the reunion between the Fringe team and Phillip Broyles, stating, "the way that he says “Agent Dunham” to Olivia and the way she answers “Philip” is one of the sweetest moments in Fringe history, and well-earned."

Ramsey Isler of IGN called the episode "great" and gave it an 8.5 out of 10. He summarized the show by saying, "Fringe was in rare form with a shocking turn of events that injected much-needed excitement back into the final season." Cory Barker of TV.com named it the 20th best episode of the series, saying, "Etta's death was both gut-wrenching in the moment and important for the season's larger narrative interests."
