= Liberty (Fringe) =

- Fringe episode
- Episode no.: Season 5 Episode 12
- Directed by: P. J. Pesce
- Written by: Alison Schapker
- Production code: 3X7512
- Original air date: January 18, 2013

Guest appearances
- Michael Kopsa as Captain Windmark; Lance Reddick as Phillip Broyles; Seth Gabel as Lincoln Lee; Michael Cerveris as September; James Kidnie as the Commander

Episode chronology
← Previous "The Boy Must Live"	Next → "An Enemy of Fate"
- Fringe season 5

"Liberty" is the twelfth episode of the fifth season of the Fox science-fiction/drama television series Fringe, and the show's 99th and penultimate episode. It aired on January 18, 2013, with the series finale, "An Enemy of Fate", in the United States on Fox and in the UK and Ireland on Sky1.

== Plot ==
After Michael gives himself up to Captain Windmark, he is taken to a security facility on Liberty Island, where Windmark attempts to study Michael. Windmark finds the boy's mind impossible to read and orders more invasive diagnostics to determine what Michael is. Discovering that the boy's intelligence exceeds that of the Observers while his emotional capacity exceeds that of standard humans, Windmark returns to 2609 to suggest to his superior that they destroy the child to protect themselves, but instead is told to simply "disassemble" the boy for future study.

Broyles learns of Michael's location and relays it to the Fringe team, but cautions them that the facility is nearly impossible to infiltrate. While brainstorming, Olivia suggests that she be re-injected with Cortexiphan to let her cross over to the parallel universe, travel to Liberty Island there, cross back and retrieve Michael, and then repeat these steps to get back safely. However, Peter worries about the effects of re-dosing Olivia with potentially lethal levels of the drug, while Walter is concerned with the unknown condition of the parallel universe. Astrid suggests using the window ("Peter") to determine the state of the parallel universe, and through this, they find that there are no signs of the Observer invasion there, giving Olivia's plan credibility.

While September returns to the lab to start assembly of the device to send Michael into the future, the Fringe team goes to an underground safehouse to prepare Olivia for crossing over. Walter administers four doses—one for each expected crossing—despite the harm it does to her. As the drug takes effect, Peter and Walter have a discussion about the nature of sacrifice. When Olivia recovers from the injections, Walter warns her of how long she has and that jumping too fast will cause rapid withdrawal symptoms.

Olivia jumps near the site of the parallel-universe Fringe Division building, where she is met by her doppelganger and current leader of Fringe Division, Fauxlivia, and her former partner from the prime universe, Lincoln Lee; the two have since married and have a son. They arrange transport to Liberty Island and take her to the coordinates they believe Michael is being kept at; Olivia crosses over but finds too late that the boy is being taken to surgery, while she herself starts experiencing double visions of the two universes. She fights her way through Observers, and stops the operation in time, with Michael smiling at the sight of her. With the boy, Olivia crosses back over, where Fauxlivia and Lincoln help to stop an Observer who followed her back across. Olivia thanks them for their help and crosses back over at Battery Park with Michael.

In the conclusion, Windmark discovers that Broyles has relayed Michael's location to the Fringe team. Meanwhile, September has completed the device, but one component fails to work. He goes to December, and requests a favor.

== Production ==
The episode was written by co-executive producer Alison Schapker, marking her third credit of the season. Schapker wrote a total of ten episodes over the entire series run. The episode was directed by P. J. Pesce, his second directing for the series after previously directing "An Origin Story".

== Themes and analysis ==
The concept of liberty was a prominent theme of the episode, as seen through the use of the Statue of Liberty and the episode's title.

== Reception ==
=== Ratings ===
The combined showing of "Liberty" and "An Enemy of Fate" earned Fringe its highest ratings for the season, with 3.2 million viewers and a 1.0 rating for adults 18-49.

=== Reviews ===
Ramsey Isler of IGN gave "Liberty" a very positive review, calling it "an episode that showcased just how good this show can be when it's at the top of its game." Isler thought the plot ideas were "executed perfectly", and enjoyed the return of Broyles. Isler also enjoyed seeing the alternate universe one more time, but felt it was too short-lived. Isler gave the episode a score of 9.1 out of 10. After the conclusion of the series, Isler later named the episode the 10th best episode of Fringe, saying it "is an episode that pulls off the clever trick of being action-oriented while enhancing the story through a subtle metaphorical theme." Noel Murray of The A.V. Club said the episode "takes a while to get going, though it ramps up considerably in its second half." Murray called the second half "much more exciting", and the Michael rescue scene "genuinely suspenseful". He gave the two-part finale a collective grade of an "A−".
