= Transilience Thought Unifier Model-11 =

- Fringe episode
- In the dystopia of the Observer-controlled 2036, Walter discovers a CD and listens to "Only You", shortly before finding a single dandelion growing out of the desolation. Critics praised this final scene as setting the tone for the season, showing hope for the characters.
- Episode no.: Season 5 Episode 1
- Directed by: Jeannot Szwarc; Miguel Sapochnik
- Written by: J. H. Wyman
- Production code: 3X7501
- Original air date: September 28, 2012

Guest appearances
- Georgina Haig as Etta Bishop; Michael Kopsa as Captain Windmark; Clark Middleton as Edward Markham; Shaun Smyth as Anil

Episode chronology
← Previous "Brave New World (Part 2)"	Next → "In Absentia"
- Fringe season 5

"Transilience Thought Unifier Model-11" is the first episode of the fifth season of the American Fox science-fiction/drama television series Fringe, and the show's 88th episode overall. The episode premiered in the United States on September 28, 2012.

It was written by J.H. Wyman and was directed by Jeannot Szwarc and Miguel Sapochnik.

== Plot ==
Peter (Joshua Jackson), Walter (John Noble), and Astrid (Jasika Nicole), after being recovered by Etta (Georgina Haig), begin to adjust to the Observer-controlled world of 2036. Walter notes that he and the Observer September had created a plan prior to the Observers' takeover, but September had fragmented Walter's memory to protect the information. After the Observers' arrival, Walter had Olivia (Anna Torv) retrieve a device to help restore these memories, but she had disappeared. In the present, they trace Olivia's path, finding a nearby patch of amber, but cut into with several human-sized chunks removed. Etta explains there are "amber gypsies", who cut and sell trapped humans on the black market. They track down Olivia's piece of amber to Edward Markham (Clark Middleton), who had been in love with Olivia since the first time he saw her.

While they are retrieving the amber, the Observers, alerted by the black market dealer, arrive. Though they safely escape with Olivia, Walter is captured and taken to a secure Observer facility, where Captain Windmark (Michael Kopsa) arrives to interrogate him. Windmark starts violently probing Walter's mind. He taunts Walter with the fact that there is no music in this future, that nothing will grow from the scorched earth. On continued probing, Windmark discovers the fragmented memories and attempts to obtain the memories by any means possible.

Olivia is freed from the amber and has a tearful reunion with Peter while meeting her grown-up daughter for the first time. As they talk, it is revealed that Peter, Olivia, and young Etta were enjoying a picnic in a park on the day of the Observers' invasion, and Etta went missing in the confusion. Subsequently, Peter and Olivia had separated; Peter going to search for Etta, who had been taken by the Observers, and Olivia joining Walter in fighting them. Etta takes them to a hidden facility where human resistance members have found the device that Olivia had been trying to locate, the Transilience Thought-Unifier Model-11, which is capable of restoring Walter's thoughts, though they believe the device to be non-functional. While there, they can track Walter's capture to a secured Observer facility. Etta uses her Fringe credentials to break into the facility and recover Walter. Afterward, Windmark connects Etta to images of a young girl from Walter's mind.

Once safe, Walter finds that the Unifier device activates to his touch, but when they try to use it, it fails to find any memories; Etta suspects that the memories were destroyed, and the plan is lost for good. A despondent Walter tries to sleep but is distracted by reflections from outside, which he traces to a makeshift sculpture made of broken CDs. In a bag nearby he finds an undamaged CD and plays it on a car's stereo; he cries as it plays Yazoo's "Only You", the first music he's heard since awaking in 2036. As he mulls emotionally, he spies a single dandelion, growing from the rubble, and cries to himself.

== Production ==
"Transilience Thought Unifier Model-11" was written by showrunner J.H. Wyman, while being directed by Smallville and House M.D. veterans Jeannot Szwarc and Miguel Sapochnik.

Filming of the episode commenced on July 18, 2012, three months after Fox renewed the series for a 13-episode fifth and final season. On July 24, 2012, production was halted for ten days due to actor John Noble's treatment for a sleeping disorder in Los Angeles. According to Noble, he "basically hit a wall" after having struggled with insomnia and sleep apnea for years. "I went to the hospital, had all the tests, and we put the strategies into place to deal with both of those issues, including the space-age mask that I wear to bed now," he commented to Entertainment Weekly. "It’s pretty unsightly." The actor added, "I couldn’t even think, mate. I was working and going: 'This is really hard.'"

Beginning from this episode, former main cast member Seth Gabel will not appear, due to his character, Lincoln Lee, being written off at the end of season four. Main cast members Lance Reddick and Blair Brown, who play Phillip Broyles and Nina Sharp respectively, did not appear in this episode and were not credited among the main cast. However, they were still listed in the episode's press release and will appear in later episodes.

== Reception ==
=== Ratings ===
"Transilience Thought Unifier Model-11" first aired in the United States on September 28, 2012. An estimated 3.2 million viewers watched the episode. It earned a ratings share of 1.1 among adults aged 18 to 49, a tie with the series premiere of the CBS show Made in Jersey. The episode was up slightly from the previous season finale, but less than Fringe's fourth season premiere rating of 1.5.

=== Reviews ===
Noel Murray of The A.V. Club gave the episode an A−, noting that while the first half of the episode had much exposition, once Olivia was recovered, the emotional connection between all the main characters and the closing moments significantly improved the episode. Zap2It's Carina Adly MacKenzie believed that with the season premiere, "Fringe completely reinvented itself," citing as evidence the lack of pressure to attract new viewers and instead the desire to please longtime fans. She called Haig a "revelation" and noted her resemblance to Torv, who Adly MacKenzie asserted was "per usual, heartbreakingly perfect." The Zap2It reviewer also found Walter's torture "tough to watch, but we can't tear our eyes away from John Noble's award-worthy performance." Writing for Entertainment Weekly, Jeff Jensen criticized Peter and Olivia's break-up backstory, believing it was not compatible with their known timeline and also because "it felt to me like Fringe was making more out of the matter than it should have, trying too hard to make some emotional drama, to give Anna Torv and Joshua Jackson something to play." Jensen concluded his review by noting the series' departure from the old episode formula of "imbu[ing] the inhuman with as much emotional resonance as their human character" in favor of "a swift-moving serialized thriller," and hoped the change "has the weight and power that we've come to expect."

Ramsey Isler of IGN was more critical of the episode and rated it 7.7 out of 10. Due to the season's shortened length, he said he was a "tiny bit concerned that this season premiere wasn't as powerful as I hoped." Isler added that while the episode "does a good job of filling in the informational gaps... there's still something missing. There's still no link between where we were for 4 seasons, and where we are now." He was unsure about Henrietta's addition, writing that because she was "thrust into the mix and viewers were just expected to accept her as is," she did not yet feel a part of the series. Isler did however praise the final sequence with Walter, writing that it "is a great scene; artfully directed and made even more special by the fact that Fringe rarely uses pop music to set the mood. This scene is simple but impressive enough to stand out as the best part of this episode and set the tone for the rest of the season. There's still hope for this story and this world, and as usual Fringe viewers will have to be patient to see that hope spring forth."
