= The Human Kind =

- Fringe episode
- Episode no.: Season 5 Episode 8
- Directed by: Dennis Smith
- Written by: Alison Schapker
- Production code: 3X7508
- Original air date: December 7, 2012

Guest appearances
- Michael Kopsa as Captain Windmark; Jill Scott as Simone; Shaun Smyth as Anil; Kett Turton as Briggs

Episode chronology
← Previous "Five-Twenty-Ten"	Next → "Black Blotter"
- Fringe season 5

"The Human Kind" is the eighth episode of the fifth season of the Fox science-fiction/drama television series Fringe, and the show's 95th episode overall.

The episode was written by Alison Schapker and directed by Dennis Smith.

== Plot ==
Olivia (Anna Torv) is still worried about the effects of the Observer implant on Peter (Joshua Jackson), and succeeds in getting another one from their ally Anil (Shaun Smyth) for Walter to study. Peter is still trying to track down Captain Windmark (Michael Kopsa) to avenge killing his and Olivia's daughter Etta, using the precognitive abilities of the implant. He flees Etta's apartment just before Windmark and his associate arrive, and heads to New York City to put his plan into motion.

Walter frees another video tape, this one directing him to the city of Fitchburg, 46 miles northwest of Boston. The tape instructs them to recover an electromagnet. Olivia, after giving the implant to Walter (John Noble), goes off alone to recover it, anxious about Peter's whereabouts. As Olivia travels, Walter and Astrid (Jasika Nicole) discover that the implant can transform the human brain into one of advanced intelligence but at the cost of losing all emotions if left in too long, and let Olivia know this.

At a scrap auto yard in Fitchburg, Olivia meets Simone (Jill Scott), who has been waiting for her arrival. Simone explains that a man matching Walter's description had asked her mother shortly after the Observers' purge to set aside the electromagnet and a truck to transport it, and she in turn kept to her mother's promise. While they wait for one of Simone's crew to get diesel fuel for the truck, she explains to Olivia that she has a mysterious sense of the future, which Olivia dismisses given her own past experiences with Fringe events. Nevertheless, Simone implies that it is a gift and notes that Olivia still carries the bullet that Etta had on her necklace.

Peter tries to set up a trap for Windmark in New York, but instead is cornered by him and his associate. Peter and Windmark fight, during which Windmark claims that despite Peter's precognitive abilities, everything has been going as Windmark planned, all aimed towards this moment. He also provides Peter a mental image of what Etta's last thoughts were before her death - that of her parents before the arrival of the Observers. When Windmark's associate appears and tries to subdue Peter, Peter is able to turn the tide, kill the associate, and escape. He returns to Walter's lab to take care of his wounds, where Walter tries to implore him to stop, as Peter is his emotional basis. Peter refuses to listen and then returns to New York to make another attempt on Windmark's life.

When the fuel is delivered, Olivia leaves alone with the truck. However, along the way she is captured by humans who know she is wanted by the Observers. They lock her in a building to await the Observers' arrival. She is able to set a trap using loose trash and the bullet necklace, kills the men, and escapes with the truck and magnet. She arranges with Anil to store the magnet and truck until needed, and learns of Peter's current state from Walter. She finds Peter waiting to kill Windmark, but coaxes him out of it by explaining that Etta remains within them and their memories, showing him the bullet necklace. After verifying that his plan to kill Windmark is on track, Peter pauses for a moment, and then voluntarily removes the implant. He then falls into Olivia's embrace.

== Production ==
"The Human Kind" was written by co-executive producer Alison Schapker and directed by The Practice veteran Dennis Smith.

== Reception ==
=== Ratings ===
"The Human Kind" first aired in the United States on December 7, 2012 on Fox. An estimated 2.7 million viewers watched the episode, and earned a ratings share of 0.9 among adults aged 18 to 49, to rank third in its timeslot. The episode matched the previous episode in overall viewership.

=== Reviews ===
IGN's Ramsey Isler gave it a positive review, saying its strengths were seeing Olivia back in the action and thought the action scenes are "hard-hitting and fun". Although he felt the conclusion of the "Peter-as-Observer" arc did not satisfy as much. Noel Murray of The A.V. Club gave it a strong review, saying it had a strong mix of science fiction elements and character emotion. He also noted another reason of the episode's success, is because "that each individual plot point and character beat that leads up to the big tearjerker finish is well-honed." He ultimately awarded the episode an "A−" grade.
