= Alison Schapker =

American television writer and producer

- Other name: Ali Schapker
- Occupations: Writer, producer
- Years active: 2001–present

Alison Schapker is an American television writer and producer.

She is well known for her work on the ABC espionage series Alias, the FOX science-fiction series Fringe and the Netflix science-fiction series Altered Carbon.

== Career ==
She was a staff writer on the hit ABC series Alias and wrote several of its episodes along with her writing partner, Monica Owusu-Breen. She has also worked on the series: Charmed, Lost, Brothers & Sisters and Fringe.

The Lost writing staff, including Schapker, were nominated for the Writers Guild of America (WGA) Award for Best Dramatic Series at the February 2007 ceremony for their work on the second and third seasons.

=== Alias ===
In 2003, Schapker joined the espionage-action series Alias in its third season as an executive story editor and writer. At the beginning of season four, she was promoted to producer, and by the final season, she had been named supervising producer. During her three-season span, Schapker co-wrote twelve episodes total. The installments are as follows:

- "A Missing Link" (03.04) (co-written by executive story editor Monica Owusu-Breen)
- "After Si" (03.13) (co-written by Breen)
- "Unveiled" (03.18) (co-written by Breen)
- "Blood Ties" (03.20) (co-written by Breen and co-producer J. R. Orci)
- "Détente" (04.07) (co-written by producer Breen)
- "The Index" (04.10) (co-written by Orci)
- "The Orphan" (04.12) (co-written by Breen)
- "Search and Rescue" (04.21) (co-written by Breen)
- "Prophet Five" (05.01) (co-written by supervising producer Breen)
- "Bob" (05.08) (co-written by Breen)
- "30 Seconds" (05.13) (co-written by Breen)
- "Reprisal" (05.16) (co-written by Breen)

=== Brothers & Sisters ===
In 2006, Schapker was brought on to develop the first season of the ABC drama Brothers & Sisters as a writer and supervising producer. She then went on to become co-executive producer at the start of season two, and then held the position of executive producer throughout seasons three and four. At the conclusion of the fourth season, Schapker left the show. Episodes she co-wrote are as follows:

- "Sexual Politics" (01.12) (co-written with supervising producer Monica Owusu-Breen)
- "The Other Walker" (01.16) (co-written with Breen)
- "Bad News" (01.20) (co-written with Breen)
- "Home Front" (02.01) (co-written with co-executive producer Breen)
- "Two Places" (02.06) (co-written with Breen)
- "Holy Matrimony" (02.09) (co-written with Mark B. Perry and Breen)
- "Prior Commitments" (02.16) (co-written with Breen and co-executive producer Greg Berlanti)
- "Mexico" (03.24) (co-written with executive producer Breen)
- "The Science Fair" (04.12) (co-written with Breen)
- "Time After Time, Part Two" (04.19) (co-written with Breen)

=== Lost ===
In Fall 2006, Schapker joined the third season crew of ABC's Lost, as a writer and supervising producer. She left the series in January 2007. She co-wrote one episode while working on the show, with supervising producer Monica Owusu-Breen, "The Cost of Living".

=== Fringe ===
After her departure from Brothers & Sisters in Spring 2010, Schapker was hired as a writer and co-executive producer on the FOX science fiction/horror series Fringe, going into its third season. In its fifth season, Schapker retains her third season credits. Episodes she has contributed to include:

- "The Plateau" (3.03) (co-written with co-executive producer Monica Owusu-Breen)
- "Marionette" (3.09) (co-written with Breen)
- "Bloodline" (3.18) (co-written with Breen)
- "The Last Sam Weiss" (3.21) (co-written with Breen)
- "One Night in October" (4.02) (co-written with Breen)
- "Enemy of My Enemy" (4.09) (co-written by Breen)
- "A Better Human Being" (4.13) (Schapker and Breen co-wrote a teleplay based on a story by executive story editors Glen Whitman and Robert Chiappetta)
- "The Bullet That Saved the World" (5.04)
- "The Human Kind" (5.08)
- "Liberty" (5.12)

=== Almost Human ===
From 2013 to 2014, she worked on the FOX series Almost Human. Serving as a co-executive producer and writer until its cancellation.

=== The Flash ===
In summer 2014, Schapker joined the DC Comics produced CW series The Flash, as a writer and consulting producer. Her first episode to contribute to was the series' third installment, "Things You Can't Outrun", which she co-wrote with Grainne Godfree. The episode featured the introduction of Ronnie Raymond. She next co-wrote the seventh installment, "Power Outage", again with Godfree. Schapker and Brooke Eikmeier co-scripted the series' 11th episode, "The Sound and the Fury". It introduces infamous rogue member Pied Piper. She and Eikmeier went on to co-write the series' 20th installment, "The Trap".

=== Scandal ===
From 2015-2017, Schapker was the consulting producer and co-executive producer on the TV show Scandal for 19 of the episodes.

=== Altered Carbon ===
In July 2018, it was announced that Schapker will be the co-showrunner and one of the executive producers of the second season of the Netflix science-fiction series, Altered Carbon. On May 23, 2019, it was announced that Schapker will be the primary showrunner for the series, replacing Laeta Kalogridis who is still credited as an executive producer.

=== Westworld ===
In 2022, Schapker was the executive producer for all 8 episodes of Season 4 of Westworld, the show's final season before being canceled by HBO.

=== Dune: Prophecy ===
In 2024, Schapker was the showrunner on the first season of Dune: Prophecy.
