= Five-Twenty-Ten =

- Fringe episode
- Episode no.: Season 5 Episode 7
- Directed by: Eagle Egilsson
- Written by: Graham Roland
- Production code: 3X7507
- Original air date: November 16, 2012

Guest appearances
- Michael Kopsa as Captain Windmark; Shaun Smyth as Anil; Blair Brown as Nina Sharp; Gabe Khouth as Dr. Darryl Hastings

Episode chronology
← Previous "Through the Looking Glass and What Walter Found There"	Next → "The Human Kind"
- Fringe season 5

"Five-Twenty-Ten" is the seventh episode of the fifth season of the American Fox science-fiction/drama television series Fringe, and the show's 94th episode overall. The episode premiered in the United States on November 16, 2012.

It was written by Graham Roland and directed by Eagle Egilsson.

== Plot ==
Peter (Joshua Jackson), upgraded by an implanted Observers' device, comes to understand the precognitive abilities that the devices give their owners, though also experiences side-effects like insomnia. He works with Anil (Shaun Smyth) of the human resistance to try to replace one of their briefcases with an identical one containing a bomb. Their first attempt doesn't work because Peter failed to account for all the variables, but their second attempt is a success; later, when this Observer meets with others, the bomb that contains a bio-agent gruesomely kills them (later revealed as the same one used in the show's pilot episode).

Meanwhile, Walter (John Noble) retrieves another tape from the ambered part of the lab. The video instructs them to obtain two of the Observers' "beacons" (as seen in "The Arrival"), which help to fix a point in space and time. The video discloses two stored at Kelvin Industries (where Walter and former partner William Bell worked previously); entry to the storage area would require Bell's hand print, which explains why Walter had cut off William's hand after they had been released from the amber (as seen in "Letters of Transit").

Walter, Olivia (Anna Torv), and Astrid (Jasika Nicole) go to the facility. The entrances are blocked by rubble; as traditional means to remove the rubble would be difficult to acquire, the three decide to elicit help from Nina Sharp (Blair Brown). After a tearful reunion, Nina supplies them with an Observer device that sublimates rubble quickly, though she warns that its effect will quickly attract Observer forces to the area. As her aide instructs Olivia and Astrid on the device, she has a heartfelt discussion with Walter. Walter believes that the pieces of brain re-implanted by Etta is causing him to revert to the ruthless man he had been before, and asks Nina if she can see that man in him now, but Nina denies it. He tells her that having Peter to keep him grounded, he will not revert. Nina expresses how she tried to save Bell when he was on the path to megalomania. She loved him, but her love wasn't enough to save him in the end. Walter coldly asserts that Bell never loved anyone except himself, especially never Nina, and that she should have known better. She is stunned by this hurtful remark, and tells Walter that the good man she knows would never be so cruel and offensive, but that old Walter would have and she can see that man in him now. Meanwhile, Olivia expresses concern that she had once lost Peter before, after the initial Observer invasion, and fears losing him again.

As Peter rejoins them, remaining coy about his activities, the device successfully clears the rubble. Inside, they access Bell's laboratory, and Walter discovers that Bell stole his record collection, including a David Bowie album, which he takes back. While searching, they find a combination safe. Walter believes he knows the combination William used for everything (as mentioned in "Jacksonville"), but struggles to remember it, while Olivia insists time is short. Instead, Peter informs Walter he has plenty of time and Walter is able recall the combination - five, twenty, ten (the title of the episode); but on opening the safe, there are no beacons, only a strange device and to Walter's surprise, a photo of Nina. Believing the effort was all for naught, they're about to leave when Peter uses the device to bring the two beacons to the surface. Peter confidently exits the building despite Olivia's insistence that the Observers could be waiting for them. Peter, however, proves to be correct; he instructs the others return to the lab while he deals with another matter.

Walter returns to Nina, apologizing for his earlier behavior, he shows Nina the retrieved photo, revealing Bell did indeed love Nina; they regret it wasn't enough to save him. He asks her to consider helping him again remove the pieces of brain, so as to revert to his kinder self. Olivia returns to Etta's safe-house to find Peter there, in front of several boards filled with dates, times, and photos of Observers. He emotionlessly explains that he implanted the Observer's device in his head, used it to switch the briefcases to kill several Observers, and has plans to do the same for Captain Windmark, in order to avenge Etta. He demonstrates his new abilities by predicting Olivia's sentences perfectly. Worried, she leaves him to plan, while he discovers that he is starting to lose his hair. Walter, alone with the assembled components from the tape, contemplates to himself listening to David Bowie's "The Man Who Sold the World" from the recovered album.

== Production ==
"Five-Twenty-Ten" was written by supervising producer Graham Roland and directed by Nikita veteran Eagle Egilsson.

Actress Blair Brown made a special guest appearance during the episode, after being a series regular since the pilot.

== Reception ==
=== Ratings ===
"Five-Twenty-Ten" first aired in the United States on November 16, 2012 on Fox. An estimated 2.7 million viewers watched the episode, and earned a ratings share of 0.9 among adults aged 18 to 49, to rank fourth in its timeslot. The episode increased in overall viewership from the previous episode.

=== Reviews ===
Noel Murray of The A.V. Club gave it a mixed review. He felt the episode's biggest fault was that it was too redundant, reminding the audience of previous events. But, Murray very much enjoyed Peter's mission to sabotage the Observers, calling it "both fascinating and tense". He awarded the episode a "B−" grade. IGN's Ramsey Isler gave it a very positive review, saying the episode had great plot points and revelations, and very much enjoyed Peter's new powers and the visual effects featured in the episode. He rated the episode 9.1 out of 10.
