= Astrid Farnsworth =

Fictional character in the television series Fringe

- Fringe character
- First appearance: "Pilot" (episode 1.01)
- Last appearance: "An Enemy of Fate" (episode 5.13)
- Created by: J. J. Abrams; Alex Kurtzman; Roberto Orci
- Portrayed by: Jasika Nicole

In-universe information
- Occupation: FBI agent (field agent in rebooted timeline); Fringe agent Walter Bishop's lab assistant
- Family: Stephen Farnsworth (father; deceased in alternate universe); Mrs. Farnsworth (mother; deceased in both universes)

Astrid Farnsworth is a fictional character from the science fiction television series Fringe, which aired on the Fox Broadcasting Company in the United States from 2008 to 2013. The character was created by series' co-creator J. J. Abrams, and is portrayed by actress Jasika Nicole. Astrid is one of the series' protagonists, and was introduced as a junior FBI agent, doing research work for Olivia Dunham on her cases and became involved in a multi-agency task force of the U.S. Department of Homeland Security called the Fringe Division, dealing with supernatural events that are linked to experimental occurrences. She works alongside Walter Bishop for the entirety of the series.

Astrid's role gradually increases throughout the series. In the first three seasons, she acts as Walter's lab assistant but also takes personal care of him. A common gag in the series is Walter erroneously calling Astrid a series of different names similar to her real name. In the fourth season, due to the alternate timeline, Astrid is now a field agent, and also takes on a larger role, particularly the episode "Making Angels." Following a plot line in the second season, viewers are introduced to Astrid's doppelgänger from the parallel universe, an autistic computer and statistics specialist within the Fringe division. Nicole's performance as both versions of the character were praised.

== Arc ==
Astrid graduated from Haverford College with a B.A. in music and linguistics and a minor in computer science, having taken computers apart since she was six years old. She speaks five languages. In the pilot episode, she is first introduced as Olivia's assistant whom she brings in to help work with Walter in the lab, although her main function as a character acted as being someone to whom Walter Bishop explains things. In "The Same Old Story", Astrid contributes to the investigation by recognizing the Sargent Bridge that was the last thing one of Christopher Penrose's victims saw before she died. In "The Ghost Network", Astrid translates the Latin that the adversaries are using to communicate with each other into English for the rest of the investigative team. At the end of the episode, she takes Roy McComb away to have him sign some release forms. In "The Arrival", she is sedated against her will by Bishop so that he can abscond with the beacon and protect it from being stolen. He later attempts to sincerely apologize to her for his actions, although it takes some time for her to forgive him.

In the fourth season's alternate timeline, Astrid acts as a field agent, based on the effects of Peter ceasing to exist as an adult from the events of "The Day We Died", to ensure both universes work together. In "Making Angels", she is visited by her counterpart, and screams when seeing her, as she had never met her. Her counterpart speaks in a stilted and nearly hysterical manner, which makes it difficult for Astrid to understand her. Alternate Astrid reveals her father died and explains to Astrid that her autism prevented her from properly expressing her grief to anyone but herself, so she crossed over to speak with Astrid. Astrid attempts to counsel her double and befriends her while they work on a case. Her alternate eventually questions her about the relationship she shares with her own father, revealing the alternate's father-daughter relationship was strained because she was not normal. Astrid attempts to ease her grief by telling her that her own father is distant and also has a hard time expressing his feelings, but that she knows he loves her in his own way. Her counterpart leaves seemingly reassured, and Astrid returns home to a loving and doting father, revealing that she lied to her double to make her feel better. In "Brave New World", Astrid demonstrates adept combat skills by defending Walter and taking out several of William Bell's henchmen as they try to locate him, before she is shot in the stomach. Upon recovering in the hospital, she bonds with Walter.

In the fifth season, Astrid, along with Olivia, Peter and Walter are freed from amber after 21 years due to the Observer takeover and are now part of a resistance to remove them from the current timeline. After they recover Walter's old videotapes on the instructions of defeating them, they discover from the Observer named September, a distant ally of theirs, that they must take Michael, an Observer-like child who is part of the plan, to the future by convincing a scientist from Norway that removing human emotions for intelligence is unnecessary, as the child, Michael, would be an example of this. Ultimately, the plan is made to remove the Observers from existence. In "An Enemy of Fate", Astrid and Walter bond as he decides he must make the sacrifice to account for his mistakes. Walter tells Astrid she has a beautiful name, and she tries to comfort him by saying they will be back in the lab when the timeline is reset as usual. In the final scene, Astrid watches in tears as she sees Walter for the last time as he crosses through the wormhole with the child anomaly, Michael, thus creating a time paradox and ceasing to exist in the final timeline.

== Development ==
Nicole's performance of the alternate Astrid Farnsworth, who is autistic, is based on her real-life sister.

== Reception ==
Jasika Nicole's increased role in the fourth season was praised. In particular, the episode "Making Angels" was considered a long overdue highlight which explored her character, her parallel universe's character struggling over the death of her father among other things. Noel Murray of The A.V. Club gave Nicole particular praise for her portrayal as the alternate Astrid – dubbed "Austrid" – her mannerisms and how realistically the character was portrayed. However, he was "mildly dismayed" that the storyline concluded with the alternate Astrid wondering if her father loved her, as experiencing love was a common trope in stories with autistic characters. He wondered how some of the events mentioned fit into the larger story arc, but found that the episode "offers its own refutation for those who get frustrated trying to figure out what's what." SFX reviewer Richard Edwards was positive toward the character-driven developments of Astrid and Walter.

Writing for the Los Angeles Times, Andrew Hanson felt Astrid's story was "enthralling". Jeff Jensen of Entertainment Weekly enjoyed the impact that the other Astrid made on the prime universe characters. Den of Geek highlighting the use of Astrid and Jasika Nicole's performance as "note-perfect".
