= The Boy Must Live =

- Fringe episode
- Episode no.: Season 5 Episode 11
- Directed by: Paul Holahan
- Written by: Graham Roland
- Production code: 3X7511
- Original air date: January 11, 2013

Guest appearances
- Michael Cerveris as September/Donald; James Kidnie as The Commander; Michael Kopsa as Captain Windmark

Episode chronology
← Previous "Anomaly XB-6783746"	Next → "Liberty"
- Fringe season 5

"The Boy Must Live" is the eleventh episode of the fifth season of the Fox science-fiction/drama television series Fringe, and the show's 98th episode overall.

The episode was written by Graham Roland and directed by Paul Holahan.

== Plot ==
Walter (John Noble) is recovering from visions that the child Observer Michael gave him by touch, including one which revealed that "Donald," the man who had helped Walter in the past with the plan to defeat the Observers, is really September (Michael Cerveris). Realizing that the visions implored his sub-conscious, Walter decides to use the sensory deprivation tank to explore the visions further. With Peter's (Joshua Jackson) help, Walter is able to review the vision of September as Donald, and locates the experience as having occurred in an apartment in Brooklyn, New York. The Fringe team travels there with Michael, during which Walter reveals to Peter that he remembers things from the original time line, including the relationship he and Peter had before Peter entered the Machine. Walter helps identify the correct apartment, and they find it occupied by September, who has not seen Walter for 20-some years.

September explains that after helping Fringe division in the past, the Observers had stripped him of his Observer implant and performed a "biological reversion" to make him human. He and Walter had spent time together following this, taking the name Donald from Donald O'Connor from Singin' in the Rain. September further explains that in 2167, an experiment in developing human genes and sacrificing human emotion for intelligence, would eventually give birth to the emotionless Observers. The Observers developed asexual procreation techniques; in the case of Michael, he was born from September's genes but came out as an anomaly having both emotions and great intelligence. Michael normally would have been destroyed, but September decided to hide him in the past. September now suggests that by sending Michael forward in time to 2167, September would hope they would be able to prevent the experiment from being performed, wiping out the Observers from existence. Should this happen, time would possibly be reset from the point of the Observer's first interference with the past; Olivia (Anna Torv) takes this as a chance for them to see Etta again. Walter identifies that he was given the hologram of the plans for the device from Etta (as seen in "Letters of Transit") that would be able to send Michael forward in time, which will be constructed from all of the components collected by following the tapes. The group, with September, leave to recover an item in a nearby storage locker that is another component of the device.

Captain Windmark (Michael Kopsa) travels to his future of 2609 where he meets with other Observers, warning them that the child Observer has been located in their relative past. He learns of the child's relationship to September and of September's past transactions in helping Fringe division. Windmark explains to his superior of the interference of the Fringe team and requests permission to go back to a point in time where he could prevent this, but is refused, and told that his current operations are on their planned path. On his return, he learns of September's location, and with other agents, travels there, finding the apartment empty; a bomb rigged by September goes off but Windmark and his agents escape in time. Loyalist agents help to identify the Fringe team leaving and roadblocks are put in place.

At the storage facility, September finds the device and gives it to Walter. Walter confides in September that he worries Michael's visions imply Walter may die from the plan, and realizes that September's warning, "the boy must live", from 1985 (as seen in "Peter") was directed toward Michael and not Peter. September reminds Walter of the time he had received a drawn white tulip as a sign of redemption (as seen in "White Tulip"), and that he had recovered that letter for the future, as part of a notebook he had collected on the Fringe team; however, while he still has the envelope, the location of the letter itself is unknown, but September says Walter will find his redemption when he finds the letter. The team prepares to leave but Donald opts to stay behind. When they discover the roadblocks, they split up and make their way to the monorail station, which is heavily patrolled by Loyalist guards. Just as the train is about to leave, Michael steps off before Olivia can stop him, and he is taken away by guards to Windmark.

== Production ==
"The Boy Must Live" was written by supervising producer Graham Roland, marking his third writing credit of the season. Roland wrote a total of thirteen episodes over the entire series run. It was directed by Paul Holahan, who previously directed season two's "Snakehead" and season four's "Novation".

In the show, September shows Walter a notebook of collected information and curios that he has obtained over his time as an Observer. An encyclopedia guide, September's Notebook — The Bishop Paradox, written by Tara Bennett and Paul Terry who had previously written the Lost Encyclopedia for Lost, has been announced - appearing similar to the prop used within the show - for sale in March 2013.

== Cultural references ==
The traditional folk song "Greensleeves" is played by September using a small music box; one lyrical variation on this melody is "What Child Is This?", as noted by The A.V. Club's Noel Murray, reflecting on the theme of the episode.

== Reception ==
=== Ratings ===
"The Boy Must Live" first aired in the United States on January 11, 2013 on Fox. An estimated 2.44 million viewers watched the episode, and earned a ratings share of 0.8 among adults aged 18 to 49. The episode dropped in viewership from the previous episode, and became the least-viewed episode of the series.

=== Reviews ===
IGN's Ramsey Isler gave the episode a good review, but called it "far from perfect". Isler very much enjoyed the full return of Michael Cerveris as September/Donald, as well as getting answers to old mysteries such as the Observer kid from "Inner Child", but felt the answer was too clichéd. He also felt "the story lacks the energy level you might expect from a near-finale." He ultimately gave the episode a score of 7.2 out of 10. Noel Murray of The A.V. Club gave it a similar review, giving it a "B" grade. He called it "a very talky episode, and doesn't really balance its exposition-dump with quite enough action." He also said the episode "suggests that Fringe is going to push all-in with a 'power of love' resolution", but commented that, "it's hardly a radical departure for Fringe to consider technology in the context of humanity" and "it's been the whole dang point of the show: what makes us human, and whether technology or turns of circumstance can change the essence of who we are."
