= Jenni Blong =

American actress

- Other names: Jeni Blong, Jenny Blong
- Occupation: Actress
- Years active: 1990–present
- Spouse(s): John Livingston (brother of Ron Livingston, married as of October 2007)

Jenni Blong, sometimes credited as Jeni Blong or Jenny Blong, is an actress who has worked in American film, television, and theater. She has guest starred in a variety of television series, including Big Love, True Blood, Lost, The Booth at the End, and Fringe. She has also had small roles in the films Cry-Baby, 200 Cigarettes, S1m0ne, and Finding Amanda.

== Career ==
=== Theater ===
In 1998, Blong appeared as Honey in New Century Theatre's production of Who's Afraid of Virginia Woolf?. The Daily Hampshire Gazette praised the actress, writing that "although her portrayal is occasionally too mannered, over all, [she] does well portraying Honey as a fragile simp with a dirty secret." Also in 1998, Blong starred as Ophelia in The Circle Hamlet, an interpretation of Shakespeare's Hamlet. It was the first production by new theater company Public Domain.

=== Television and film ===
Blong had a role in the 1990 film Cry-Baby, co-starring Johnny Depp.

Beginning in 1999, Blong has done guest starring, single appearances in a number of American television series, including NYPD Blue, The Guardian, The District, Cold Case, 24, ER, and Ghost Whisperer. Blong received a major role in the HBO drama series Big Love as Evie, for which she appeared in five episodes. Over a four year period, starting in 2008, Blong played Michelle Stackhouse in another HBO series, True Blood. She also appeared in a 2010 episode of the television series Lost.

In the 2010 episode "Peter" of the science fiction series Fringe, Blong guest starred as Dr. Carla Warren, the tragic lab assistant of Walter Bishop (John Noble). She returned in the 2012 episode, "Black Blotter", as a hallucination of Walter's. Den of Geek called her performance "striking" and "undoubtedly sexy, but cold in a decidedly powerful way,"

Since 2011 Blong has portrayed waitress Doris in the first and second seasons of the science fiction drama series The Booth at the End. The Huffington Post was pleased that she returned for the second season, writing that she played the role "promisingly." Series creator Christopher Kubasik believed that Blong "has one of the hardest jobs in that show because basically her little scenes are these little quick quirky blackout sessions with almost no substance of clarity about what’s going on underneath. Everything is implied and everything that’s implied is only suggestion. It’s that vague. And she rocked the house every time and I will be grateful forever for her."

== Filmography ==
Year	Film/Television series	Role	Notes
1990	Cry-Baby	Inga	Film
1998	The Census Taker	Brenda	Short
1999	200 Cigarettes	Cheryl's Friend	Film
1999	Angel	Young Woman	Television series Guest star, episode: "In the Dark"
2000	NYPD Blue	Julianne Maurice	Television series Guest star, episode: "Stressed for Success"
2000	Strong Medicine	Tina	Television series Guest star, episode: "Second Look"
2000	Bad Dog	Giselle	Short
2002	Recipe for Disaster	Bonnie	TV film
2002	The Guardian	Susan Muter	Television series Guest star, episode: "Causality"
2002	S1m0ne	Jane	Film
2002	For the People	Stacey	Television series
2003	The District	Tanya Dunsmore	Television series Guest star, episode: "Back in the Saddle"
2003	The Agency	William Yun's Fiancee	Television series Guest star, episode: "Our Man in Washington"
2003	Cold Case	Nicole	Television series Guest star, episode: "Our Boy Is Back"
2003	Coyote Waits (2004 TV Show) Skinwalkers: The Navajo Mysteries, S1:E2	Ava Walker	Television movie
2004	24	Susan Cole	Television series Guest star, episodes: "Day 3: 7:00 a.m.-8:00 a.m." and "Day 3: 6:00 a.m.-7:00 a.m."
2004	Century City	Anni	Television series Guest star, episode: "Without a Tracer"
2004	Six Feet Under	Pregnant Woman in Elevator	Television series Guest star, episode: "Untitled"
2007	Music Within	Shelly	Film
2007	Eyes	Barbara Steele	Television series Guest star, episode: "Whistleblower"
2007–2011	Big Love	Evie	Television series Five episodes
2008	Finding Amanda	Paula	Film
2008–2012	True Blood	Michelle Stackhouse	Television series Six episodes
2009	ER	Elaine Griswold	Television series Guest star, episode: "T-Minus-6"
2009	Labor Pains	Pregnant Soccer Mom #1	Film
2009	Ghost Whisperer	Linda Miller	Television series Guest star, episode: "Lost in the Shadows"
2009	Lie to Me	Mrs. Jackson	Television series Guest star, episode: "Tractor Man"
2010	Lost	Lindsey	Television series Guest star, episode: "What Kate Does"
2010	Justified	Molly Tucker	Television series Guest star, episode: "The Hammer"
2010–2012	Fringe	Dr. Carla Warren	Television series Three episodes
2011–2012	The Booth at the End	Doris	Television series Nine episodes
2013	Lost Time	Melissa	Film
