= The Recordist =

- Fringe episode
- Episode no.: Season 5 Episode 3
- Directed by: Jeff T. Thomas
- Written by: Graham Roland
- Production code: 3X7503
- Original air date: October 12, 2012

Guest appearances
- Connor Beardmore as River Massey; Georgina Haig as Henrietta "Etta" Bishop; Michael Kopsa as Captain Windmark; Paul McGillion as Edwin Massey; Shaun Smyth as Anil

Episode chronology
← Previous "In Absentia"	Next → "The Bullet That Saved the World"
- Fringe season 5

"The Recordist" is the third episode of the fifth and final season of the American Fox science fiction/drama television series Fringe, and the show's 90th episode overall. The episode aired in the United States on October 12, 2012.

It was written by Graham Roland and directed by Jeff T. Thomas.

== Plot ==
Walter (John Noble) and Astrid (Jasika Nicole) use the makeshift laser to recover another tape from the ambered part of the lab. The contents point to a location in northwest Pennsylvania, though the instructions for what to do there are garbled. While Astrid stays behind to try to improve the tape's playback, Walter, Peter (Joshua Jackson), Olivia (Anna Torv), and Etta (Georgina Haig) travel to the designated location. There, they find a small camp of human outcasts, all displaying splotches of bark-like material over their bodies. They are introduced to Edwin (Paul McGillion), the camp's leader, who explains that their condition is due to some unknown agent within the area. Those in the group consider themselves to be recorders of history ever since the takeover by the Observers in order to prevent history from being rewritten by the Observers. They maintain a large number of data cubes containing whatever knowledge they can recover, including much about Fringe division. Edwin is unable to find information about Walter's previous visit to the site, but Astrid is able to fix the playback enough to know that Walter must find a mine in the area, which Edwin identifies as an abandoned gold mine.

In the mine, they find a shaft to a lower level; hanging from a rope is a corpse showing extreme signs of the bark infection, which Walter believes is due to something in the mine and evacuates everyone. In examining the body, Walter determines that the condition is caused by the Observers' modification of the Earth's atmosphere, the effects being diluted due to the remote location; the atmosphere in the mine accelerated the process, calcifying the body. Edwin discovers that, sometime in the past, the Observers took away a man, identified only as "Donald," who had retrieved red-colored rocks from the mine with the intention of delivering them to a "scientist from Boston." Astrid later confirms that the rocks are a unique and necessary energy source for Walter's plan. Walter begins to prepare a protective suit to keep the effects of rapid calcification from affecting whoever wears it, allowing them to recover more rock samples. While working on the suit, Peter and Olivia discuss the events shortly after the Observers' arrival, with Olivia revealing that seeing all the "missing persons" posters while they were looking for Etta had made her realize that her work with Fringe division in fighting the Observers was more important than getting Etta back.

Meanwhile, human Loyalists discover evidence of the Fringe team, and report it to the Observers, who set off to capture the team; one of the Loyalists is actually a mole, and contacts the underground to warn Etta of their approach. With time short, the only way to get the right materials for the suit is to barter with another nearby refugee camp, a step Edwin is reluctant to take; he would rather see the Fringe team leave instead. However, Edwin's son River (Connor Beardmore), who idolizes the Fringe team, accuses his father of never helping and runs off. Edwin realizes his mistake, and makes contact with the other camp, then later has a heart-to-heart with River about no longer just being a recorder of history but becoming part of it. Edwin gives Peter and Olivia directions to the other camp and bartering goods, but when they arrive, they find the spot empty, and Peter realizes it was a deception. Meanwhile, at camp, Edwin goes to the mine alone to recover the rocks; by the time Walter and Etta discover this, Edwin has been able to bring enough of the rocks out of the lower level, while his body succumbed to the calcification at the bottom of the shaft.

As the Fringe team escape with the mineral and return to the lab, abandoning their van to deceive the Loyalist forces, River takes over for Edwin as the recorder, writing a eulogy for his father.

== Production ==
"The Recordist" was written by supervising producer Graham Roland and directed by CSI: NY veteran Jeff T. Thomas.

Production Mistake: 2 minutes, 30 seconds into the episode, Walter (via videotape) states a DMS coordinate of 49 degrees 20 minutes 2 seconds North. When asked to play back the tape, Olivia recites the coordinate as 41 degrees 20 minutes 2 seconds North. Olivia is supposed to have near perfect recall and mis-hearing (or mis-remembering) this could make the difference between an area in Canada and an area in Northern Pennsylvania.

== Reception ==
=== Ratings ===
"The Recordist" first aired in the United States on October 12, 2012 on Fox. An estimated 2.64 million viewers watched the episode, and earned a ratings share of 1.0 among adults aged 18 to 49, to rank fourth in its timeslot. The episode saw a decrease in viewership from the previous episode.

=== Reviews ===
Noel Murray of The A.V. Club awarded the episode a "B" grade, saying it was not as strong as the first two episodes of the season due to its more straight-forward plot but thought it had a strong emotional storyline. IGN's Ramsey Isler also thought the episode's storyline was lacking, and that it could have been more exciting, but felt the supporting cast was strong and that it told a good emotional story.
