= Letters of Transit =

- Fringe episode
- Episode no.: Season 4 Episode 19
- Directed by: Joe Chappelle
- Written by: Akiva Goldsman; J. H. Wyman; Jeff Pinkner
- Production code: 3X7019
- Original air date: April 20, 2012

Guest appearances
- Henry Ian Cusick as Simon Foster; Georgina Haig as Henrietta "Etta" Bishop; Ben Cotton as Impound Clerk; Michael Kopsa as Captain Windmark; Bradley Stryker as Rick

Episode chronology
← Previous "The Consultant"	Next → "Worlds Apart"
- Fringe season 4

"Letters of Transit" is the nineteenth episode of the fourth season of the Fox science-fiction drama television series, Fringe, and the series' 84th episode overall. It is set in the future, where the Observers have taken control of human society. In 2036, two FBI agents fight to free their world of the Observers by finding the amber-encased bodies of the original Fringe team. The episode's premise is subsequently built upon as the key setting of the show's fifth and final season.

The episode was co-written by showrunners J.H. Wyman and Jeff Pinkner, and consulting producer Akiva Goldsman. Executive producer Joe Chappelle served as director. While some critics wondered how the episode related to the overall series, actor John Noble has explained that "Letters of Transit" established the template for the fifth season. It featured guest appearances by actress Georgina Haig and Lost veteran Henry Ian Cusick.

The episode first aired on April 20, 2012, in the United States, and was watched by an estimated 3.03 million viewers. Television critics praised the riskiness of the episode premise and the actors' performances while also expressing doubt about its place during the season. The episode was nominated for the 2013 Hugo Award for Best Dramatic Presentation (Short Form).

== Plot ==
On-screen text describes how, in 2015, the Observers, no longer content with observing history, took over human society. They killed many in an event called "The Purge", and transformed the remaining into a totalitarian culture; though members of the Fringe division attempted to fight the takeover, they were easily defeated, and the remaining Fringe division were allowed to remain to police the human "Natives". The Observers are aided by the ability to read most human minds, able to sense motives before they can be acted on.

In 2036, two Fringe Agents, Simon Foster (Henry Ian Cusick) and Etta (Georgina Haig), recover the body of Walter Bishop (John Noble), Walter having purposefully encased himself and his team in amber shortly after the Observer takeover. Though they are able to release him from the amber, they find that he has suffered memory damage and lacks the mental capacity to build a strange device of his own design. Simon and Etta talk to Nina Sharp (Blair Brown), learning that Walter had William Bell remove a piece of his brain some time in the past, which she postulates could be used to heal Walter's brain now. However, the piece is still in storage in the old Massive Dynamic facility on the main island of New York City, tightly controlled by Observers who can read their thoughts, making its recovery difficult. They are able to make it to the vault in Massive Dynamic, in part due to the inability of the Observers to read Etta's mind, and successfully restore Walter's memories. They are, however, unaware that they have alerted Fringe division—still led by Agent Broyles (Lance Reddick)—and the Observers to their presence; a coordinated team, instructed to shoot on sight, is dispatched.

A more coherent Walter explains that, according to the Observer known as September, the Observers made the Earth uninhabitable by 2609, and so traveled back in time to take over the planet themselves. As forces corner the three, Walter sets up an antimatter device to wipe out the Massive Dynamic building and their pursuers. Walter is able to lead Simon and Etta to where Peter Bishop (Joshua Jackson), Astrid Farnsworth (Jasika Nicole), and William Bell have been encased in amber. They are able to free Astrid, but as Fringe forces approach they find the equipment to free the others has malfunctioned. Simon sacrifices himself to the amber in order to push Peter free, while Walter severs Bell's hand for an unknown purpose. They escape as Broyles and his team arrive; though he does find a piece of licorice, a telltale sign of Walter's presence. As the group travels away from the city, Walter ominously reminds Astrid of what Bell did to Olivia (Anna Torv). Peter then comes to recognize Etta as his daughter, Henrietta Bishop, wearing a fired bullet as a necklace.

== Production ==
"Letters of Transit" was co-written by consulting producer Akiva Goldsman and executive producers/co-showrunners Jeff Pinkner and J.H. Wyman. Although it was previously reported Goldsman would be directing, executive producer Joe Chappelle ultimately directed the installment. The Observers are prominently featured in the episode, a mythos that has been visible since the pilot. Previously a mysterious background presence, according to Noble, they have now become "incredibly centrally important" to the series' storyline. "Letters of Transit" was written and shot before the series' renewal for a fifth season, but it was always envisioned as a genesis of the season. During this time, Wyman confirmed that a majority of the fifth season would be set in 2036, following the events of this episode, a time period depicting the Observers as oppressors rather than as passive witnesses.

"The door to the fifth season is opened in Episode 19, if you watch that, you’ll have an understanding of where they want to take the series."

— Actor Joshua Jackson on season five.

Leading up to its broadcast, journalists noted that the nineteenth episode of each season of Fringe has generally been its "craziest hour", and anticipated that "Letters of Transit" would be similarly strange. The Fox network promoted the episode with a series of four teaser videos, each containing a clue to a fifth video revealing the special opening credits for this episode. The episode contained a new opening credit sequence that helped set the tone, with "fringe" terms including community, joy, imagination, and free will.

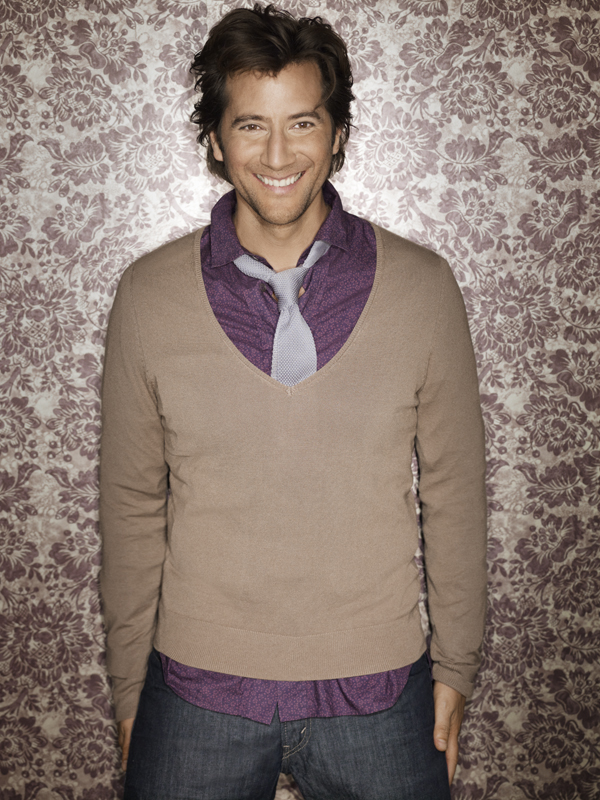
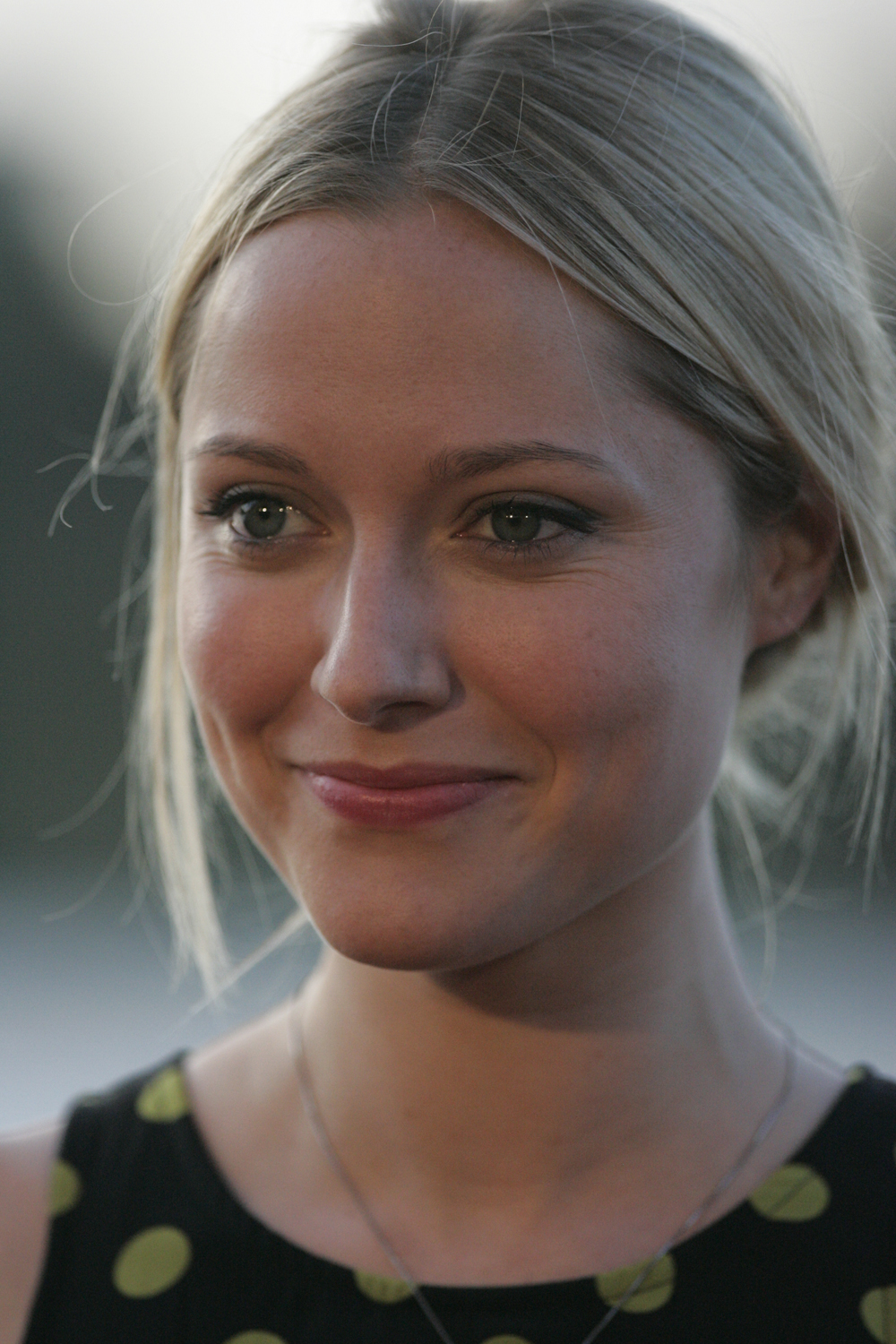
Actors Henry Ian Cusick and Georgina Haig guest starred in "Letters of Transit".

Actor Henry Ian Cusick and actress Georgina Haig guest starred in the episode as a pair of Federal agents. Cusick had worked with co-creator J. J. Abrams and executive producer Pinkner on the ABC series Lost. Cusick stated that most of his scenes were filmed with Haig and John Noble (Walter Bishop), and that the story leaves a possibility for the return of their characters in the future. Noble found it unusual to film an episode that did not involve the lead actors. He explained, "That was Walter with two really big, important guest stars, Henry Ian Cusick and Georgina Haig. It felt, to me, like it was a really strong episode. The two guest actors did a fantastic job, which is not easy to do, to step into an established company. It is out of the box and is somewhere else completely. I think that the fans will love it. Some fans of this type of material will like it anyway because Henry Ian Cusick was such a big star in Lost, but also, this new girl is just full of wonderful energy, too."

According to Noble, "Letters of Transit" features his ninth version of Walter Bishop at that point in the series. He remarked, "It’s a lot of fun as an actor because it keeps me trying to refine and to finish small parts [of Walter]." In a June 2012 interview with Entertainment Weekly, Noble called "Letters of Transit" one of his favorites of the series, explaining that he "thought that was really a beautiful looking episode, beautifully told."

== Cultural references ==
Given guest star Henry Ian Cusick's prominence in Lost, "Letters of Transit" refers to both "The Purge" and "natives", two key elements of that show. The episode also contains references to The Prisoner, where Walter exclaims "I am not a number! I am a free man!" The episode also references Star Wars when Walter states "these are not the droids you’re looking for" and "Move along". Jeff Jensen of Entertainment Weekly believed these helped set the tone of the episode: "Fringe in 2036 was The Village writ global and under Imperial rule." Matt Roush of TV Guide noted that the episode title, "Letters of Transit", alludes to a key element of the film Casablanca. The episode opens with scrolling text that has been compared to the start of the film Blade Runner.

== Reception ==
=== Ratings ===
"Letters of Transit" first aired in the United States on April 20, 2012. An estimated 3.03 million viewers watched the episode. It earned a 1.0 ratings share among adults 18–49, a 10 percent increase from the series low of the previous week. Fringe finished third in its timeslot behind NBC's Grimm and ABC's Primetime: What Would You Do?.

=== Reviews ===
"At this point, with the end of the series a virtual certainty either this year or next, and the ratings indicating that there's nothing left but hardcore fans, I suppose the producers didn't have much to lose by taking a chance. Even though the gamble didn't completely work for me, I respect the producers for giving it a shot, so it gets bonus points for that."

— IGN writer Ramsey Isler

IGN's Ramsey Isler gave the episode a mixed review, noting that "its concept is intriguing, bold, and extremely risky. I'm just not sure if it works. It's such a drastic change of scenery and tone it's hard to say whether this is genius or madness." Isler observed that he would have "absolutely loved" the episode if he had been "given appropriate context through a suitable setup ... But the approach we got feels an awful lot like a gimmick, and this show does not need to gamble with gimmicks at this point." Isler did find positive elements of the episode however, and rated it 8 out of 10, an indication of a "great" episode. He praised Walter's return "to a much more confident, focused man who's a bit scary in his determination and resolve," as well as the events that followed. Isler concluded that "the core ideas are really good, but the way the new concepts were introduced seems haphazard, and a huge gamble that could turn off all but the most hardcore viewers."

Like Isler, Entertainment Weekly columnist Ken Tucker enjoyed Walter's transition "from happy, babbling, 'I love LSD!' licorice-licking Walter to a Walter who yelled at the others when escaping", calling it "one of the night's great pleasures." Tucker's Entertainment Weekly colleague Jeff Jensen commented that he was able to "roll" with some of the less plausible plot details (such as a still existing Massive Dynamic) out of praise for guest stars Cusick and Haig, believing they "worked well in this world." Jensen also reserved attention for Noble's scenes, calling them variously "frisky and poignant", "hilarious", and "touching." Lastly, Jensen was happy to find more details about the Observers, but wondered at the lack of the parallel universe's mention. MTV's Alex Zalben was more critical. He wondered how the episode fit into the rest of the season, and wrote "It’s a curious step, and could likely drive even more viewers away from a show that can’t afford to lose them." While disliking the "clunky, explainy" dialogue, Zalben still commented that, "for a die hard FRINGE fan like myself, this episode was crack. Huge emotion, crazy science, and epic set pieces. The end of the episode had me dying to watch the next one, even if it isn’t a direct continuation. That’s good television right there."

Jeff Jensen of Entertainment Weekly named "Letters of Transit" the seventeenth best episode of the series, stating "What at first seemed to be one of Fringe's nutty number 19s turned out to be the episode that helped earn the series a fifth and final year. Of course, some may now question the merits of ringing out the series with a season-long story set entirely in this future dystopia ruled by oppressive Observers. But the single episode that introduced this premise was a cool jolt that opened a new front of Fringe mythology and gave us a character that would have a lasting impact, Etta." The episode was nominated for the 2013 Hugo Award for Best Dramatic Presentation (Short Form).

== Olivia Dunham ==
Of the 100 episodes in the five seasons, this is the only one where Olivia Dunham does not appear.
