= Tommy Gormley =

Scottish film director and producer

- Born: Thomas Matthew Gormley; 3 May 1968 (age 58); Glasgow, Scotland
- Education: University of Strathclyde (attended)
- Occupations: Director, producer
- Years active: 1989–present
- Known for: Star Wars: The Force Awakens, Star Trek (2009 film)
- Spouse: Sarah Purser (m. 1995)
- Children: 2
- Father: Charles Gormley

Tommy Gormley is a Scottish film director and producer. He is known for his work on the genres of action, drama and science fiction. Gormley has produced or served as assistant director on films such as Star Trek and Star Wars: The Force Awakens.

He produced or co-produced a number of TV series, including Fringe. Gormley won a British Academy of Film and Television Arts award for outstanding contribution to craft at the 2014 British Academy Scotland Awards.

== Early life ==
Thomas Matthew Gormley was born on 3 May 1968 in Glasgow, Scotland, the son of Charles Gormley, a Scottish film maker. He attended two schools, St Joseph's primary and St Columba of Iona. He enrolled in the University of Strathclyde.

Gormley credits his father Charles Gormley for inspiring him to get into the film industry.

== Career ==
=== Summary ===
Tommy Gormley has been the director of Fringe. And he also featured prominently as the position of assistant director in Star Wars: The Force Awakens, Star Trek Into Darkness, John Carter, Mission: Impossible – Ghost Protocol, Super 8, The Phantom of the Opera and 2012. He is to be an assistant director for Wonder Woman.

== Filmography ==
=== Films ===
Year	Film	Producer	Assistant Director	Director	Notes
1989	Wild Flowers		Yes		Third assistant director
1990	Lorna Doone		Yes		Third assistant director
1991	The Black Velvet Gown		Yes		Third assistant director
1991	The Black Candle				Second assistant director
1993	Bad Behaviour		Yes		Second assistant director
1993	Raining Stones		Yes		First assistant director
1993	Screen One		Yes		First assistant director
2012	Fringe			Yes	First assistant director
2013	Star Trek Into Darkness		Yes		First assistant director
2015	Mission: Impossible – Rogue Nation		Yes		First assistant director
2015	Star Wars: The Force Awakens				Co-Producer, first assistant director
2017	Wonder Woman	Yes	Yes		First assistant director
2018	The Cloverfield Paradox				Second unit director
2018	Mission: Impossible – Fallout		Yes		First assistant director
2019	Star Wars: The Rise of Skywalker				Executive producer; First assistant director
2020	Wonder Woman 1984				First assistant director: additional photography Also Unit Production Manager
2023	Mission: Impossible – Dead Reckoning				Executive producer, first assistant director
2024	Knuckles				Co-executive producer, first assistant director
2024	Sonic the Hedgehog 3				Executive producer
2025	Mission: Impossible – The Final Reckoning				Executive producer, first assistant director
2026	The Great Beyond	Yes			
