= Jasika Nicole =

American actress and illustrator

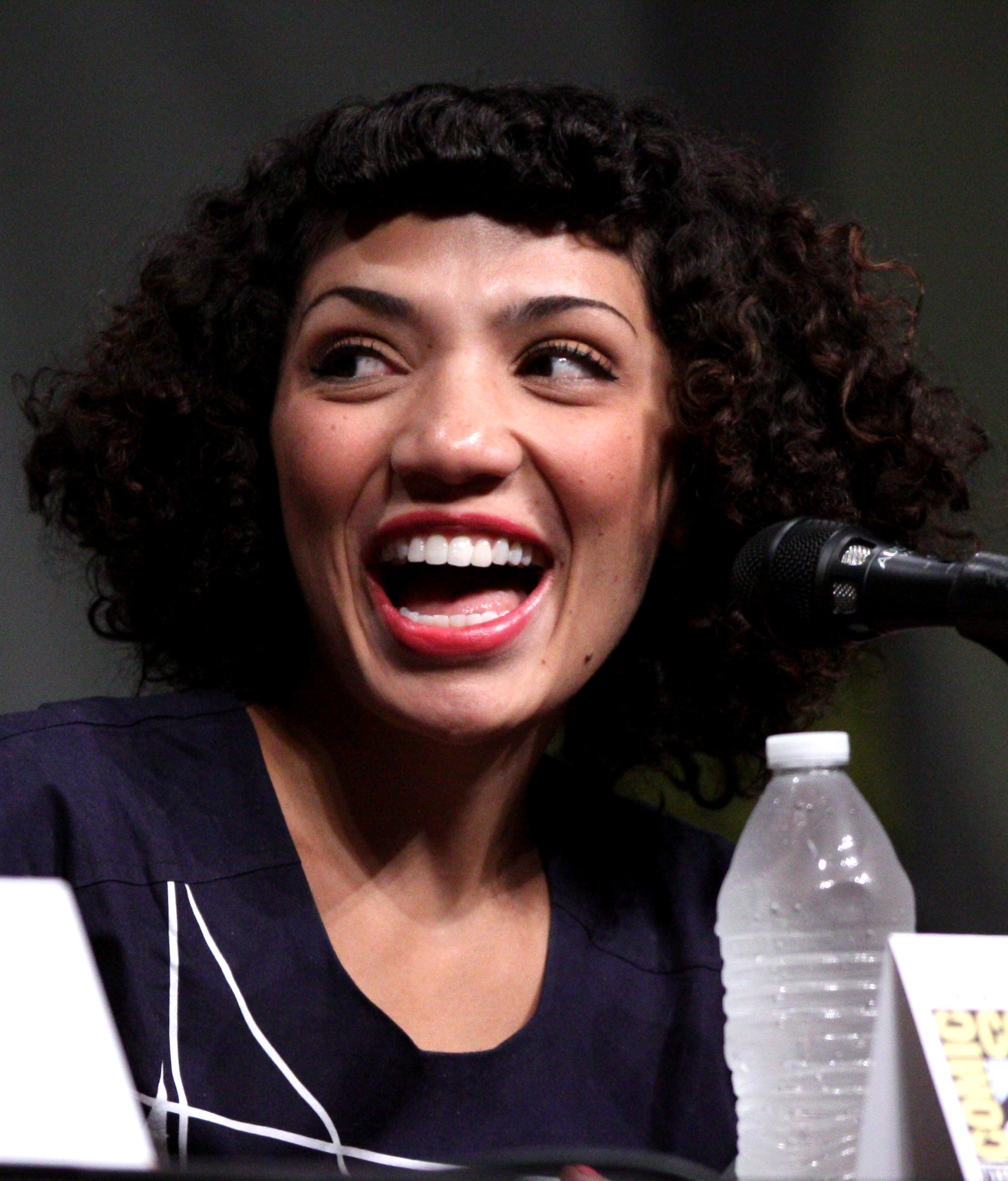
- Jasika Nicole at the Calgary Expo in April 2012
- Education: Catawba College
- Occupation: Actress
- Years active: 2005–present
- Website: www.jasikanicole.com

Jasika Nicole is an American actress and illustrator. She is known for her role as Agent Astrid Farnsworth on the Fox series Fringe. She has guest-starred in Scandal as Kim Muñoz. She starred as Carly Lever, the head of pathology, in the ABC medical drama The Good Doctor.

== Career ==
Nicole studied theatre, dance, voice and studio art at Catawba College in Salisbury, North Carolina.

In 2017, she voiced a femme "brown-skinned energetic creative" named Reina, for the Amazon Video animated series Danger & Eggs, who likes to build with her hands, is empowered by the world around her, and is the best friend of one of the protagonists.

She is currently the voice of Dana Cardinal on the podcast Welcome to Night Vale. She also voiced Keisha, the protagonist and narrator on Alice Isn't Dead, a podcast by Night Vale co-writer Joseph Fink.

== Personal life ==
Nicole is biracial, and has said that while growing up, there were very few TV characters with whom she could identify. Nicole has publicly declared she is gay. She was featured in the 2010 OUT 100 list in Out, and was photographed alongside Bruno Tonioli, Armistead Maupin, and Bill Silva for the issue.

Nicole designs and makes all of her own clothes, including shoes, pants, jackets, and undergarments.

== Filmography ==
=== Film ===
Year	Title	Role	Notes
2006	Take the Lead	Egypt	
2007	Get Faamous	Alicia	
2010	She's Out of My League	Wendy	
2015	Suicide Kale	Billie Steinberg	
2016	A New York Christmas	Jasmine Taylor	
2017	Secondhand Love	Mia	
2024	Identiteaze	Michelle	
2025	There Is No Antimemetics Division	Marion Wheeler	Short film

=== Television ===
Year	Title	Role	Notes
2005	Law & Order: Criminal Intent	Gisella	Episode: "Scared Crazy"
2007	The Mastersons of Manhattan	Penny	Television film
2008	The Return of Jezebel James	Dora	2 episodes
2008–2013	Fringe	Astrid Farnsworth	Main cast
2013–2016	Scandal	Kim Muñoz	7 episodes
2015	Key & Peele	Girlfriend	Episode: "Hollywood Sequel Doctor"
2015	Major Crimes	Dolly Bowen	Episode: "Thick as Thieves"
2015–2016	Disengaged	Jess	2 episodes; web series
2016	Send Me: An Original Web Series	Woman / Lila	4 episodes; web series
2017	Hell's Kitchen	Herself	Episode: "Fusion/Confusion"
2017	Adventure Time	Frieda	Voice, 2 episodes
2017	Underground	Georgia	7 episodes
2017	Justice League Action	Vixen	Voice, 2 episodes
2017	Danger & Eggs	Reina	3 episodes
2017–2020	The Good Doctor	Dr. Carly Lever	Recurring role (seasons 1–2), 6 episodes Main role (season 3), 15 episodes
2019	Station 19	Mila	Episode: "The Dark Night"
2020	Trash Truck	Usher	Episode: "Movie Theatre"
2021	Punky Brewster	Lauren	6 episodes
2023	Fantasy Island	Andi Nevinson	Episode: "Tara and Jessica's High School Reunion / Cat Lady"
2025	All's Fair	Dr. Testa	Episode: "Everybody Dance Now"

=== Other media ===
Year	Title	Role	Medium	Notes
2005	Law & Order: Criminal Intent	Gisella	Video game	
2013–present	Welcome to Night Vale	Dana Cardinal	Podcast	Recurring, 13 episodes
2016–Present	Alice Isn't Dead	Keisha	Podcast	Main role
2017	Agents of Mayhem	Gremlin	Video game	
2018	The Bright Sessions	Myra	Podcast	Bonus episode
2019	Alt-Frequencies	Kaya	Video game	
2026	There Is No Antimemetics Division	Marion Wheeler	Short Film on Youtube	
