= Fringe season 3 =

Fringe
- Season 3
- Region 1 DVD cover
- No. of episodes: 22

Release
- Original network: Fox
- Original release: September 23, 2010 – May 6, 2011

Season chronology
- ← Previous; Season 2 Next → Season 4

The third season of the American science fiction television series Fringe began airing on the Fox network on September 23, 2010, and concluded on May 6, 2011. Twenty-two episodes long, the season was produced by Bad Robot Productions in association with Warner Bros. Television, and its showrunners were Jeff Pinkner and J. H. Wyman. Lead actors Anna Torv, John Noble, and Joshua Jackson reprised their roles as FBI agent Olivia Dunham and the father-son duo Walter and Peter Bishop. Previous series regulars Lance Reddick, Jasika Nicole, and Blair Brown also returned, along with recurring guest stars Kirk Acevedo, Seth Gabel, and Ryan McDonald.

Building off the finale from the previous season, Fringe's third season dealt with a war between the prime and parallel universes. During the first part of the season, odd-numbered episodes mostly took place in the parallel universe and have a red title sequence, while even-numbered episodes mostly took place in the prime universe and have the original blue title sequence. In episode eight, "Entrada", the title sequence is a mixture of blue and red to signify the universal focus of the episode. In the rest of the season, however, the episodes focus on the prime universe with brief shifts to the parallel universe.

Wyman and Pinkner saw Fringe as two shows, where they could provide a detailed mythology that was equally compelling in both universes. Eager to explore "what-if" moments, historical idiosyncrasies and other differences were inserted to help disambiguate the two worlds. Much of the season was designed around a doomsday device, as they believed its mysteriousness was "a great story engine for us." The nineteenth episode, "Lysergic Acid Diethylamide", contained long sequences of animation in order to accommodate guest actor Leonard Nimoy's retirement from acting. While the writers had attempted to continue the idea of the "mythalone" for both casual and devoted fans, Fringe mythology became more visible in the last episodes of the season. Equating the final three episodes to a chapter in a novel, the writers "linked [them] in one continuous story arc."

The third season was positively received by television critics, and it earned 77 out of 100 on the aggregate review website Metacritic, indicating critical reception as "generally favorable." Reviewers reacted well to the exploration of the parallel universe, and the performances of Torv and Noble, who each played differing versions of their original characters, were lauded. Fringe ended its third season with an average of 5.83 million viewers per episode, placing 99th for the network television season. The New York Times called the series "the best major-network show that no one is watching." Despite its low ratings, Fox renewed the series for a fourth season on March 24, 2011.

== Season summary ==
Following Peter's rescue from the parallel universe, the prime universe Fringe team comes to learn of the Wave Sink Device, the machine that Walternate was attempting to use to destroy the prime universe. They are unaware that Fauxlivia has replaced Olivia, and she works to help the Fringe Division to identify the components hidden across the globe for a similar Wave Form Device in the prime universe. She also gets romantically close to Peter.

Olivia is held in Walternate's laboratories in the parallel universe, and given drugs and conditioning to make her believe she is Fauxlivia, and subsequently a willing test subject for Walternate's tests of the powers of Cortexiphan. Olivia slowly breaks this conditioning, and on one trial, is able to cross over to the prime universe to relay a warning to Peter about Fauxlivia. Her identity exposed, Fauxlivia is extracted back to the parallel universe by Walternate's shapeshifters, while Olivia gets help from the other Broyles to cross back to the prime universe. Olivia is distraught after her return, knowing about Peter's relationship with Fauxlivia. However, after some time, the two reconcile and admit they have feelings for each other.

In the prime universe, the Fringe team learn more of the Wave Sink Device from Sam Weiss, understanding it was created by a long-advanced race known as the First People, with the power to destroy or create universes, but is only powered by Peter's biology. The two devices in both universes are quantumly entangled, allowing one to alter the other universe. Walter surmises that Walternate wants to engage the device to destroy the prime universe in hopes of healing the parallel universe damaged by his crossing in 1985. In the parallel universe, Walternate discovers Fauxlivia is pregnant with Peter's child and discreetly accelerates the pregnancy, as to obtain a sample of the child's blood to activate the Device. The effects on the prime universe are numerous but the parallel universe shows no sign of healing. Walter directs teams to move the prime universe Device to Liberty Island, the same location where the parallel device is located in the parallel universe, so as to minimize the affected areas, and then instructs Peter to use the prime device to counteract the parallel version. Instead, when Peter enters the device, he witnesses a future where the parallel universe was destroyed and the prime universe is on the verge of the same collapse. Peter finds that Walter would set a plan in motion to send The Device back into the far distant past via a wormhole (creating the First People myth), and having it trigger this memory when Peter uses it. After this experience, Peter uses the device to link the two together, fusing the two rooms from the prime and parallel universes into a bridge, allowing the two sides to meet one another. However, shortly after this Peter disappears to the apparent obliviousness of both Fringe teams; the Observers, looking on note that September was correct; they do not remember him. September simply states, "How could they? He never existed. He served his purpose."

== Episodes ==
No. overall	No. in season	Title	Directed by	Written by	Original release date	Prod. code	US viewers (millions)
44	1	"Olivia"	Joe Chappelle	J. H. Wyman & Jeff Pinkner	September 23, 2010	3X6101	5.83
In the parallel universe, Olivia manages to escape "Walternate"'s clutches and takes taxi driver Henry (Andre Royo) hostage to get around New York. Throughout Olivia's attempted escape, it is revealed that the experiment was an attempt to replace her memories with those of her alternate counterpart. Olivia remembers a safe house and decides to go there. It turns out to be the home of her counterpart's mother, Marilyn, (Amy Madigan); Olivia's real mother died years ago. Marilyn convinces Olivia that she suffered a mental breakdown as the treatment takes full effect. Now that the experiment has succeeded, she "returns" to Fringe Division. Meanwhile in the prime universe, Walter and Peter prepare to move on with their lives, with neither seeming to suspect that the Olivia with them is in fact her alternate counterpart in disguise.
45	2	"The Box"	Jeffrey Hunt	Josh Singer & Graham Roland	September 30, 2010	3X6102	5.24
In the prime universe, Thomas Jerome Newton sends men to recover a box buried in the basement of a residence, which is part of Walternate's doomsday device. However, when the men open the box, everyone in the house except a deaf man in the group dies. Walter discovers they were killed by ultrasonic sound waves, putting those in the vicinity into a trance before the box fatally "cooks" their brain. Walter and Nina attend the reading of the last will and testament of William Bell. Walter receives a note urging him "Don't be afraid to cross the line" along with a key to a safety deposit box. In the safety deposit box, Walter finds certificate of stock of Massive Dynamic, making him the sole shareholder. At the end of the episode, Peter tinkers with the disarmed box while Fauxlivia communicates with the parallel universe, saying "Peter is engaged" and receiving instructions to work on Walter.
46	3	"The Plateau"	Brad Anderson	Alison Schapker & Monica Owusu-Breen	October 7, 2010	3X6103	5.19
Back in the parallel universe, Olivia, Charlie, and Lincoln find after multiple accidents that the cause is Milo Stanfield (Michael Eklund), a man who suffered from low-functioning autism, but since underwent treatment with nootropic drugs, developing an incredible ability to calculate cause and effect to set off chain reactions that he uses to precipitate statistically impossible deaths. As Walternate perfects an experiment to determine how Olivia crosses universes, a Peter hallucination appears and informs her that she is not "from this world" and kisses her to remind her of who she is, leaving her anxious and worried.
47	4	"Do Shapeshifters Dream of Electric Sheep?"	Ken Fink	David Wilcox & Matthew Pitts	October 14, 2010	3X6104	5.22
In the prime universe, U.S. senator James Van Horn (Gerard Plunkett) is hospitalised following a car accident. After Newton arrives and shoots him in the face, Broyles discovers Van Horn was in fact a shapeshifter who collected data on Fringe Division. Walter discovers that Van Horn is still alive to some degree and has another "brain" in his back. Later, Fauxlivia and Peter capture Newton following a car chase. Knowing it may blow her cover, Fauxlivia visits him and gives him a suicide pill that causes him to bleed out mercury. In the end, Fauxlivia invites Peter to her home and sleeps with him in an attempt to draw his attention away from his growing suspicion that something is not right with her.
48	5	"Amber 31422"	David Straiton	Josh Singer & Ethan Gross	November 4, 2010	3X6105	4.80
In the parallel universe, a twin frees his brother from amber. Walternate reveals that those who are trapped in amber aren't dead, but in suspended animation and those who are released will compromise its structural integrity. However, if someone was to reveal this, it could be damaging, so the Fringe Department is tasked to capture those responsible. Throughout the episode, it is revealed that one of the twins is a serial bank robber, and when the innocent brother was ambered, he posed as him. In the end, the bank robbing twin gets ambered. Meanwhile, Walternate experiments on Olivia by taking her to a sensory deprivation tank. Olivia succeeds in traversing universes temporarily. In the end, a hallucination of Peter convinces her who she really is.
49	6	"6955 kHz"	Joe Chappelle	Robert Chiappetta & Glen Whitman	November 11, 2010	3X6106	4.82
In the prime universe, Walter is dismayed to learn that Peter is continuing to study the blueprints from the doomsday device. Meanwhile, fifteen people suffer retrograde amnesia after listening to number stations. The team discovers that there is a hidden signal buried in the radio transmission, leading them to a strange cube-like device which is assumed to be the cause; the device is revealed to be from the parallel universe, and the shapeshifter controlling them is using them to wipe the memories should the listeners solve the numbers in the station. Walter and Astrid solve the numbers; they are a series of coordinates throughout the world. When they arrive at a location in New Jersey, the team discover the coordinates lead to parts of the doomsday device. In the parallel universe, Olivia attempts to arrange another test, but a hallucination of Peter tells her she has to return home.
50	7	"The Abducted"	Chuck Russell	David Wilcox & Graham Roland	November 18, 2010	3X6107	4.85
In the parallel universe, Olivia has to deal with a serial kidnapper known as the "Candyman", who kidnaps children then releases them a few days later but with severe health problems after him having drained the hormones from their pituitary glands, which he uses to maintain his youth. With the help of Broyles' son, who was a victim, Olivia ultimately finds a kidnapped child and kills the Candyman, while Broyles kills a former physician-turned-priest who is in league with the Candyman, after the priest returns to kill Broyles' son. Broyles later discovers that Olivia has recovered her identity, but lets her go after realizing Walternate intends to kill her. Olivia enlists the help of cab driver Henry again to get her to Liberty Island where she breaks into the facility. Olivia is able to return to her universe, but is later pulled back by Walternate. However, she returned long enough to convince a cleaning lady to warn Peter she is trapped in the parallel universe.
51	8	"Entrada"	Brad Anderson	Jeff Pinkner & J. H. Wyman	December 2, 2010	3X6108	5.13
Realising she has been exposed, Fauxlivia drugs Peter and escapes. The next morning, the team find the typewriter (a "quantum entanglement" device) used to contact the parallel universe in a typewriter store. Peter discovers the location where Fauxlivia is going to return to her universe. The team arrive at the station and Fauxlivia is arrested. Meanwhile in the parallel universe, doctors prepare to kill Olivia and use her to help Fauxlivia return. Broyles manages to break her out. The two go to Walternate's old lab in Harvard. She immerses herself in the isolation chamber in time before Broyles is arrested. Olivia successfully crosses over back to the Prime universe, while Fauxlivia returns to hers, leaving behind the mutilated body of "Alternate-Broyles" to make up for her mass. While Peter and Olivia reunite at a hospital, the typewriter store owner trades a man a piece of the doomsday device in exchange for the restoration of his paralyzed legs.
52	9	"Marionette"	Joe Chappelle	Monica Owusu-Breen & Alison Schapker	December 9, 2010	3X6109	4.74
The Fringe team tracks down cases of people having had donated organs removed. They come to learn the organs all belong to the same person, Amanda, a young ballerina that died by suicide. They identify the culprit, Roland Barrett, a man that met Amanda at a suicide counseling clinic and became enraptured with her. Having reassembled her body from the corpse and donated organs, Barrett is able to bring her back to life but, when he looks at her, realizes that it isn't really Amanda he brought back. The resurrected girl later dies again. Meanwhile, Olivia attempts to adjust to life back in her world, and finds it emotionally difficult to cope with how Fauxlivia invaded Olivia's life, particularly her relationship with Peter. She breaks down at the end of the episode, blaming Peter for it. As Walter and Peter later go out for a milkshake, the Observer is seen watching them, and he reports on his phone that "He is still alive".
53	10	"The Firefly"	Charles Beeson	J. H. Wyman & Jeff Pinkner	January 21, 2011	3X6110	4.87
A series of events leads Walter to befriending musical icon Roscoe Joyce (Christopher Lloyd), keyboardist of Walter's favorite band, Violet Sedan Chair. Walter learns through the Observer September that bringing Peter from the parallel universe ultimately, through a long chain of events, led to the end of the band due to the death of Joyce's son. The Fringe team is unaware that September has engineered events in the present to test Walter's resolve to let go of Peter when the time is right.
54	11	"Reciprocity"	Jeannot Szwarc	Josh Singer	January 28, 2011	3X6111	4.53
The Fringe team and Massive Dynamic have assembled the buried components of the doomsday device, speculated to be an artifact of the "First People", a lost civilization that supposedly existed until the "mother of all mass extinctions". The device reacts to Peter's presence, but they are unable to identify what triggered this. When several shapeshifters are assassinated, Fringe and Massive Dynamic attempt to locate a mole from the parallel universe using Fauxlivia's computer files to identify the shapeshifters. Walter happens across the same files in Peter's room, and finds that Peter has been the assassin. Though Peter claims he killed the shapeshifters as he refuses to remain reactive to the events, Walter fears that the device has "weaponized" him for some purpose.
55	12	"Concentrate and Ask Again"	Dennis Smith	Graham Roland & Matthew Pitts	February 4, 2011	3X6112	4.26
A biological attack leaves a man dead, with no bones in his body. Fearing the start of a larger incident, the Fringe team track one culprit but he is hit by a car and falls into a coma. Walter suggests using Simon, an undocumented Cortexiphan patient with uncontrollable telepathic abilities, to read his mind to identify other targets. Olivia is able to coax Simon to help when he discovers he cannot read her mind as a fellow Cortexiphan patient. Simon helps to track down and stop two other ex-enlisted men who were part of "Project Jellyfish", which involved being exposed to a biological agent that would disintegrate skeletons; though the men were immune, their children were stillborn due to the agent. The men are seeking revenge. After completing the case, Simon gives Olivia a note revealing Peter's thoughts are still with Fauxlivia. Meanwhile, Nina Sharp has discovered that Sam Weiss is the author of several books of the First People. Sam tells Nina that Peter's disposition towards Olivia or Fauxlivia will determine which universe will survive when the machine is activated.
56	13	"Immortality"	Brad Anderson	David Wilcox & Ethan Gross	February 11, 2011	3X6113	3.74
In the parallel universe, the Fringe team investigates the deaths of two people, killed by the apparently extinct "skelter beetle". With Fauxlivia's boyfriend Frank's help, they track the cases to Dr. Silva who had been trying to develop a cure for the avian flu prior to the extinction of the sheep, the only known hosts for the skelter beetles. Fauxlivia is caught by Dr. Silva when she and Lincoln locate him, and believes Dr. Silva has selected her for the final host to gestate the queen beetle sustaining the species. When the rest of the Fringe team arrives, Dr. Silva reveals he was the final host, and dies after extracting the queen. Frank finds that Fauxlivia was exhibiting early pains due to being pregnant, but realizes it cannot be his child, and leaves her. Walternate, knowing that Peter is the father, provides Fauxlivia with his full support, believing that this is another way for Peter to voluntarily return to the parallel universe.
57	14	"6B"	Thomas Yatsko	Glen Whitman & Robert Chiappetta	February 18, 2011	3X6114	4.02
Strange physical behavior, including the deaths of six partygoers, in an apartment building leads Walter to believe that the same damage to the fabric of space-time occurring in the parallel universe is occurring in the prime one, and with Massive Dynamic's help, prepare a means to encase the building and surrounding area in the amber-like substance they had previously encountered. Olivia discovers that a widow, Alice, has an emotional quantum entanglement with the doppelganger of her deceased husband, Derek, that is keeping a crack between the universes open. With Olivia and Peter's help, Alice is able to recognize that the man she is seeing is not her husband, severing the ties between them and closing the crack just before a singularity developed. Olivia and Peter finally work through their relationship and spend the night together, while Walter worries that he was moments away from performing the same actions that Walternate had to do in the parallel universe to save it.
58	15	"Subject 13"	Frederick E. O. Toye	Jeff Pinkner & J. H. Wyman & Akiva Goldsman	February 25, 2011	3X6115	4.02
Following from the second-season episode "Peter", this episode returns six months later to 1986 to recount events after Peter's abduction. Elizabeth, worried that Peter will kill himself trying to return to what he believes is his home, takes him to Jacksonville, where Walter is conducting Cortexiphan trials on children. Walter finds young Olivia has been able to cross to the parallel universe, believed to be a result of fear of her abusive stepfather, and sees it as a way to return Peter. When one of Walter's tests causes Olivia to set the room ablaze by pyrokinesis, she runs away. Peter finds and meets her, and gives her confidence to trust Walter and face the fears of her stepfather. Olivia tearfully returns to Walter's office, giving him her sketchbook that shows her pictures of the parallel universe, her stepfather, and her and Peter together, but she soon finds that she inadvertently crossed to the parallel universe again. Walter warns off Olivia's stepfather, while Peter returns with Elizabeth to Reiden Lake and comes to call her "mom", a lie that eventually leads to her suicide. In the parallel universe, Walternate, having previously lost his resolve, gains new confidence, knowing through Olivia's sketchbook that Peter is in the prime universe.
59	16	"Os"	Brad Anderson	Josh Singer & Graham Roland	March 11, 2011	3X6116	3.64
The Fringe team investigates a case of thieves stealing rare metals that appear to float from the ground. Walter identifies traces of the elements osmium and lutetium in their blood, the alloy inexplicably creating a material lighter than air. They discover the culprit, Dr. Crick, an aerospace engineer who discovered the alloy and sought to try to detoxify it as a means to allow his paraplegic son to walk again. Walter realizes the strange properties of the alloy are due to further weakening of the prime universe as a result of his crossing in 1985, and determines that he must seek advice from William Bell. Believing that Bell had prepared to be returned through the use of "soul magnets", he strikes the bell that Bell bequeathed to Nina Sharp in his will. Simultaneously, as Peter is showing Olivia the five data disks he collected from the dead shapeshifters, Olivia is possessed by the spirit of Bell.
60	17	"Stowaway"	Charles Beeson	Story by : J. H. Wyman & Jeff Pinkner & Akiva Goldsman; Teleplay by : Danielle Dispaltro	March 18, 2011	3X6117	3.80
Bell, in possession of Olivia's body, promises that no harm will come to her and he will leave it after finding a suitable host. The Fringe team tracks down an apparently immortal woman, Dana with the help of an FBI agent, Lincoln Lee. Walter and Bell believe the immortality may be due to Dana having been struck by lightning twice before. They find that Dana is attempting to connect to the souls of suicidal people, hoping that she can die with them and "stow away" with their soul to heaven to rejoin those of her family that were killed in a burglary attempt. They are able to prevent Dana from using a bomb set to destroy a commuter train. Instead, when she leaves the train with the bomb, the bomb explodes and she finally dies. As Bell discusses the potential theological implications with Peter, a church bell ringing nearby brings about Olivia's personality temporarily, and Bell realizes his possession of her body may be more difficult than he thought.
61	18	"Bloodline"	Dennis Smith	Alison Schapker & Monica Owusu-Breen	March 25, 2011	3X6118	3.84
In the parallel universe, Fauxlivia is kidnapped and given a procedure to accelerate the birth of her child. As the Fringe division searches for her captors, Lincoln and Charlie learn that Fauxlivia and Olivia of the prime universe had recently temporarily swapped places, and become distrustful of Walternate. Ultimately, Fauxlivia escapes, and the Fringe division finds her in time to safely give birth to her son. It is revealed the process was all initiated by Walternate, who obtains a sample of the child's blood after Fauxlivia is brought back safely.
62	19	"Lysergic Acid Diethylamide"	Joe Chappelle	Story by : Jeff Pinkner & J. H. Wyman & Akiva Goldsman; Teleplay by : J. H. Wyman & Jeff Pinkner	April 15, 2011	3X6119	3.65
Realizing that Olivia's soul is in danger of being lost due to her possession by William Bell, the team battles frantically to extract Bell's consciousness from Olivia's body. Peter and Walter enter into her mind, with their interactions will Bell being featured in animation. Peter is eventually able to extract him, though Bell's consciousness is unable to be saved.
63	20	"6:02 AM EST"	Jeannot Szwarc	David Wilcox & Josh Singer & Graham Roland	April 22, 2011	3X6120	3.33
In the parallel universe, Walternate activates his doomsday machine, triggering devastation in the prime universe. Nina finally tells Olivia that Sam Weiss is the one that wrote The First People but she discovers he has disappeared. Sam is seen performing experiments that show the prime universe is being torn apart. Peter realizes he has no choice but to enter the machine and try and break the circuit. However, the machine rejects him and knocks him unconscious. Sam finds Olivia at the hospital with Peter and asks her to trust him. Meanwhile, Fauxlivia resolves to save both worlds by trying to bring Peter back to convince the Secretary to stop the machine. She is prevented from entering the prime universe and imprisoned.
64	21	"The Last Sam Weiss"	Thomas Yatsko	Monica Owusu-Breen & Alison Schapker	April 29, 2011	3X6121	3.52
Following the continuing disintegration of the prime universe, the Fringe team races to prevent the destruction of their world. Olivia recruits Sam for help while Peter recovers from touching the doomsday machine in the previous episode. Peter is eventually able to reinsert himself into the machine and wakes up fifteen years in the future.
65	22	"The Day We Died"	Joe Chappelle	Story by : Akiva Goldsman & J. H. Wyman & Jeff Pinkner; Teleplay by : Jeff Pinkner & J. H. Wyman	May 6, 2011	3X6122	3.29
Peter, who has entered the prime version of the machine with Olivia's help, experiences a vision of the future where the parallel universe has been destroyed and the same threatens the prime one. He opts instead to merge the two machine rooms, creating a bridge where inhabitants of both universes can solve their dilemma, before disappearing and being forgotten by both Walters and Olivias.

== Production ==
=== Crew ===
Fringe is produced by Bad Robot Productions in association with Warner Bros. Television. Co-creator J. J. Abrams continued to work as executive producer along with fellow co-creators Alex Kurtzman and Roberto Orci, who returned as consulting producers. Bryan Burk and Joe Chappelle also returned as executive producers, while Akiva Goldsman worked as consulting producer. Executive producers Jeff Pinkner and J. H. Wyman continued in their role as showrunners for the third season, which involved overseeing every episode and sometimes directly contributing episode scripts. As with every season, they laid out the third season's storyline a year in advance.

=== Writing and filming ===
The season finale of the second season introduced the parallel universe to viewers. Fringe's producers debated over how much of this universe to depict in the third season, but ultimately decided that showing the doppelgangers would "fit more into our own character's lives and show different aspects of their personalities". As a result, Fringe began its third season by alternating between episodes, with each depicting one universe. The Fox network was initially resistant to this design, as executives were "really concerned that if the episodes didn't have ['over here'] Walter or Peter in them, it wouldn't feel like our show anymore." Jeff Pinkner and J.H. Wyman explained that the series had to constantly evolve, "otherwise we'll get bored, the cast will get bored, the audience will get bored"; after the first several episodes of the season, Fox agreed it was a positive change.

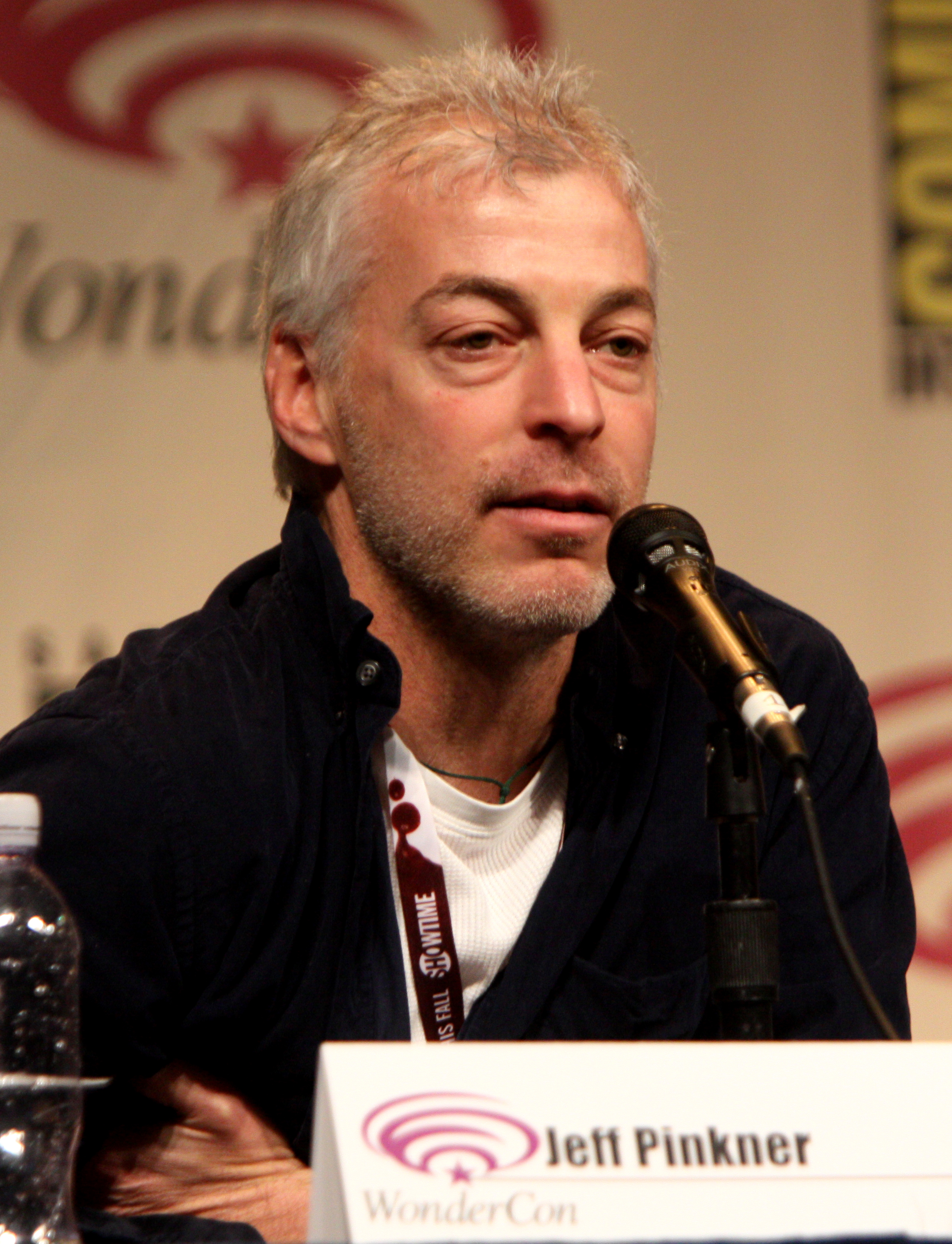
As explained by showrunner Jeff Pinkner, the third season was about Walter "truly coming to terms" with the consequences of stealing Peter, and realizing that he may have to sacrifice him, a decision that culminated in the season finale.

The producers saw the season as "two shows"; Wyman noted, "It's on us to make the mythology over there just as compelling as the mythology here, so we will enjoy both of them. We have our characters going back and forth, there or here, but there's a whole set of nice characters that you'll become very interested in very quickly. It's interesting because it gives you that gearshift." Wyman later added that parallel universe plot device "really allowed us to explore the characters deeper via their doppelgängers, to illuminate characters we already know. It's been a real gas for all of us involved in making the show." Historical idiosyncrasies were inserted into the parallel universe, such as a still-living John F. Kennedy, the non-existence of the FBI, and the Back to the Future franchise starring Eric Stoltz rather than Michael J. Fox. The writers loved creating an entire new world, and asked themselves what life would have been like in its most mundane forms, such as within daily routines. Pinkner thought it allowed them to create and explore many "what-if" moments, such as if the September 11 attacks had occurred against the White House instead of the Twin Towers, or if the Statue of Liberty still possessed its shiny copper sheen. "Entrada", the eighth episode, was the first of the season to divide its time between both universes.

Many of the episodes involved the discovery and construction of a doomsday device, which Pinkner believed to be "a good thing to design a season around" because its mysteriousness was "a great story engine for us." While the writers tried to maintain the concept of the "mythalone," a storyline that was attractive to both casual and devoted Fringe fans, the series became more invested in its mythology towards the end of the third season. "Lysergic Acid Diethylamide", the season's nineteenth episode, was the first of the series to contain sequences of animation. While previous guest actor Leonard Nimoy had retired, the writers still had storylines involving his character, William Bell. They were able to record his voice, and consequently worked with Zoic Studios to develop the episode. This unorthodox storytelling device was consistent with the nineteenth episodes of other seasons, including "Brown Betty" and "Letters of Transit".

The final three episodes of the season were "linked in one continuous story arc," and meant to seem like "you're turning the last page of a chapter in a novel. And usually in a good novel, the last pages [of a chapter] compels you forward with a new understanding of what the subject matter is and you get deeper and you can't wait to turn that page." The crew wrote the finale before the season was officially renewed, but deigned to leave it unchanged once discovering that a fourth season had been approved. Pinkner explained that "we wrote the episode, perhaps foolishly, assuming that we would be on for Season 4. We never for one second entertained that it would be the end of the series. So therefore, we didn't have to change a word!" The finale was designed to establish the groundwork by "open[ing] a new chapter" for the new season, which included Peter having never existed. Its futuristic storyline was meant to "inform the present of the show with some thematic elements," establishing to viewers that "our world is going to break down."

Different title sequences were inputted to help disambiguate the two universes, as well as establish other versions of their world. Blue and red represented the prime and parallel universes, respectively while "Entrada" featured a mixture of blue and red in its title sequence. An episode set in 1985 began with a retro title sequence, and the finale's version of the title sequence was silver-gray and black. Each opening credit sequence contained specific words that were meant to serve as "signposts" for both current and future episodes, such as the finale sequences' use of "thought extraction" and "dual maternity". Like the previous season, the third season was filmed in Vancouver. Because of its heritage buildings and antique storefronts, many of the scenes set in the alternate universe were shot in New Westminster, an area outside Vancouver. Filming of the live action parts of "Lysergic Acid Diethylamide" were shot along west Hastings Street. Executive producer Joe Chappelle returned to direct five episodes, while producer Brad Anderson was responsible for directing four. Other new and returning directors included Thomas Yatsko, Jeffrey Hunt, Kenneth Fink, David Straiton, Frederick E. O. Toye, Chuck Russell, and Charles Beeson; they each directed one episode. In addition, Dennis Smith and Jeannot Szwarc each directed two episodes.

== Cast ==
=== Main cast ===
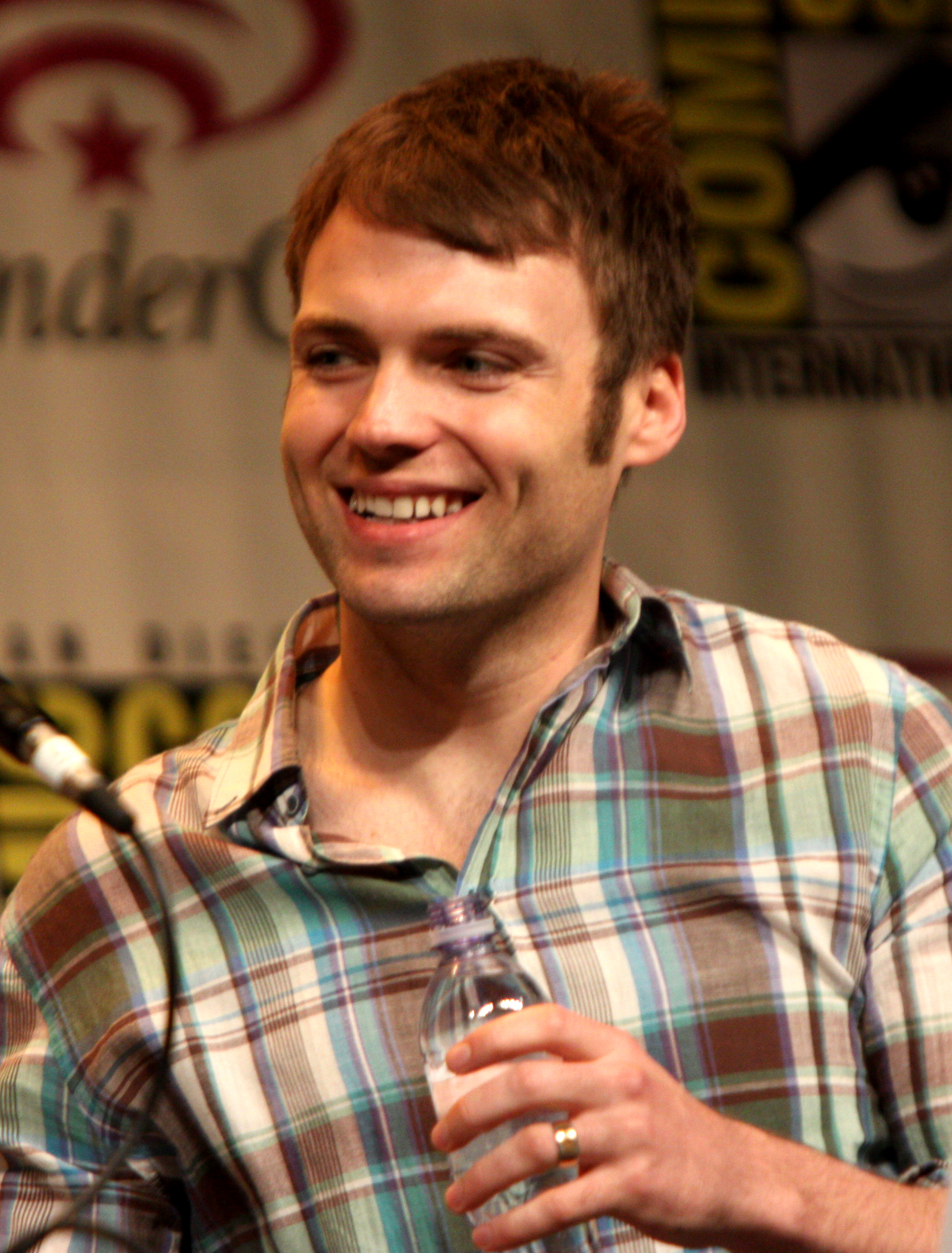
Seth Gabel played two versions of his character, Agent Lincoln Lee.

Most of the series' main cast returned for the third season. Anna Torv portrayed two versions of Olivia Dunham, each from their own universe, while Joshua Jackson returned as her love interest, Peter Bishop, and John Noble played Peter's father, Dr. Walter Bishop. Lance Reddick starred as FBI agent Phillip Broyles, and Jasika Nicole played junior FBI agent/Walter's lab assistant Astrid Farnsworth. Lastly, Blair Brown returned as Massive Dynamic executive Nina Sharp.

=== Recurring cast ===
Michael Cerveris depicted September/The Observer in every episode of the season, while Eugene Lipinski played another Observer, December, for two episodes. Seth Gabel and Kirk Acevedo returned as parallel universe Fringe agents Lincoln Lee (10 episodes) and Charlie Francis (6 episodes), respectively. The parallel universe also featured Andre Royo as Henry Higgins, Amy Madigan as Marilyn Dunham, and Philip Winchester as Frank Stanton, all for three episodes. Ryan McDonald played two versions of Brandon Fayette for twelve episodes, and Orla Brady guest starred as Elizabeth Bishop for one episode. Sebastian Roché returned from the second season to play one of the season's antagonists Thomas Jerome Newton for two episodes, along with Gerard Plunkett as Senator Van Horn. Kevin Corrigan depicted Samuel Weiss for three episodes, Karen Holness played Diane Broyles for two, Clark Middleton played Edward Markham and J. R. Bourne played Agent Edwards, each for one episode.

The season featured single episodes with special guest appearances by Christopher Lloyd as Roscoe Joyce, Jorge Garcia as Massive Dynamic security guard Kevin, Paula Malcomson as Dana Gray, Emily Meade as Ella Dunham, Brad Dourif as Moreau, and Leonard Nimoy as William Bell.

== Reception ==
=== Ratings and broadcast ===
Fringe's second season ended with an average of 6.252 million viewers per episode and a 2.3 ratings share for adults 18–49, causing the series to finish in 79th place out of all the season's network television shows. Despite its middling ratings, Fringe received a full third season renewal on March 6, 2010.

At the beginning of the 2010–11 United States network television schedule, Fringe remained in its Thursday timeslot for the first nine episodes of the third season, where it faced tough competition from the high-rated Grey's Anatomy and CSI: Crime Scene Investigation. The season premiere aired on September 23, 2010, to 5.83 million viewers in the United States, earning a 2.1 rating for viewers 18–49. This was thirty percent down from the previous season's premiere, "A New Day in the Old Town". On its initial broadcast on November 4, the fifth episode hit a then-season low of 1.8/5 in the adult demographic. Fox moved Fringe to a new Friday night timeslot on January 21, 2011, where it typically broadcast opposite Supernatural, Dateline NBC, and CSI: NY. Because of the night's "death slot" status, this move made television critics and fans nervous that Fringe was near cancellation. For the first few episodes in its new timeslot, its ratings remained consistent with previous Thursday episodes, but soon began to drop.

There were some positive aspects of the third season's ratings however. Among adults aged 18 to 49, Fringe placed first in its Friday timeslot. Total viewers, as well as the ratings share for adults and teenagers, surpassed Fox's average for that same timeslot. Furthermore, the average household income of Fringe's adult viewers was higher than the total U.S. adult population average, and its adult viewers also had a higher index of having four or more years of college. Despite its low ratings, Fringe was officially renewed for a fourth season on March 24, 2011 to the surprise of observers – six days before the renewal, Fringe had reached a new series ratings low. The renewal came in the wake of campaigns conducted by Fringe actors, fans of the series, and television critics. Kevin Reilly, Fox's entertainment president, commented that "the series' ingenious producers, amazingly talented cast and crew, as well as some of the most passionate and loyal fans on the planet, made this fourth-season pickup possible."

Fringe ended its third season with an average of 5.83 million viewers per episode, finishing in 99th place for the American network television season. Time shifted viewing played a significant part in Fringe's third season ratings. According to a report released by Nielsen Company, Fringe was the only network television series among the top ten of most time-shifted shows of 2011. The report continued that time shifting increased the series' overall audience by eighty percent.

=== Reviews ===
On Rotten Tomatoes, the season has an approval rating of 100% with an average score of 7.2 out of 10 based on 13 reviews. The website's critical consensus reads, "With more mysteries to uncover and mind-bending plot devices, season three of Fringe further cements the show's status as one of the best science fictions shows on television." Aggregate review site Metacritic gave the third season 76 out of 100 based on six critical reviews, indicating the critical reception was "generally favorable". Critic Josh Wigler, writing for Comic Book Resources, lauded the season's first two episodes, explaining "For the third season of the critically acclaimed Fox series, executive producers and co-showrunners Jeff Pinkner and J.H. Wyman have responded to their audience's demands by creating a new kind of episode: the mythalone, designed to propel the story and characters forward while still keeping the show accessible to new viewers on a weekly basis... it's nothing short of amazing that the new mythalone approach to Fringe works wonders, if only in the first two episodes of the new season."

After watching the first three episodes, Aaron Riccio of Slant Magazine also praised the new season, writing "The plots have generally been the "fringe" of Fringe; the meat has been in the characters' developing feelings for one another. Now the two are not only on equal footing, but they're both firing on full cylinders... Afraid, perhaps, to toy with viewers the way that Lost did, Fringe keeps the action moving, rapidly unspooling its mysteries, and that decision proves to be a wise one. Rather than waiting for a future payoff, Fringe is cashing in with every episode, showing us the escalating war between worlds—and with likeable characters and compelling cases to boot. Ironically, it's by branching out in two different directions that the show has become, more than ever, the centerpiece of a hypercompetitive Thursday night lineup."

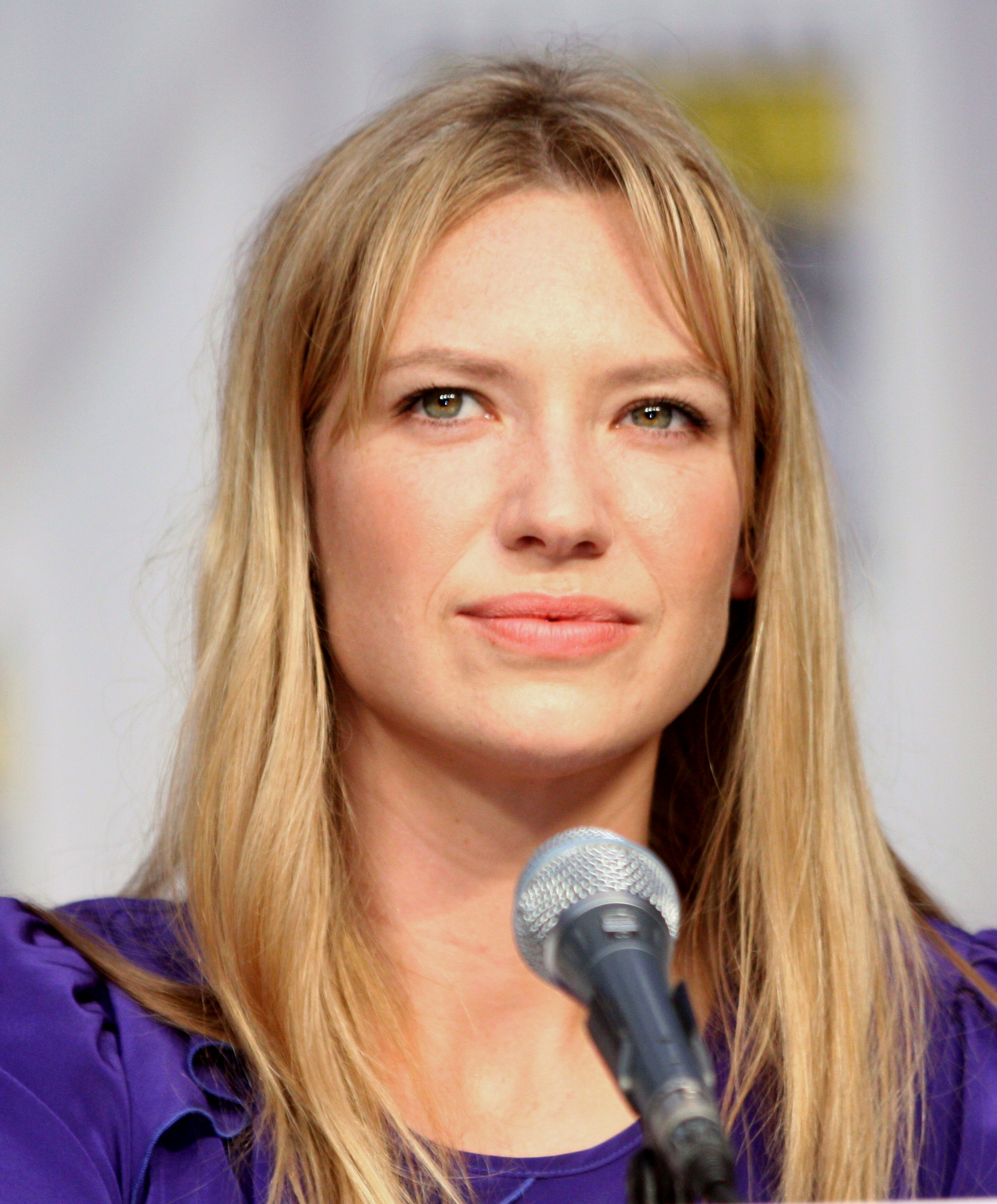
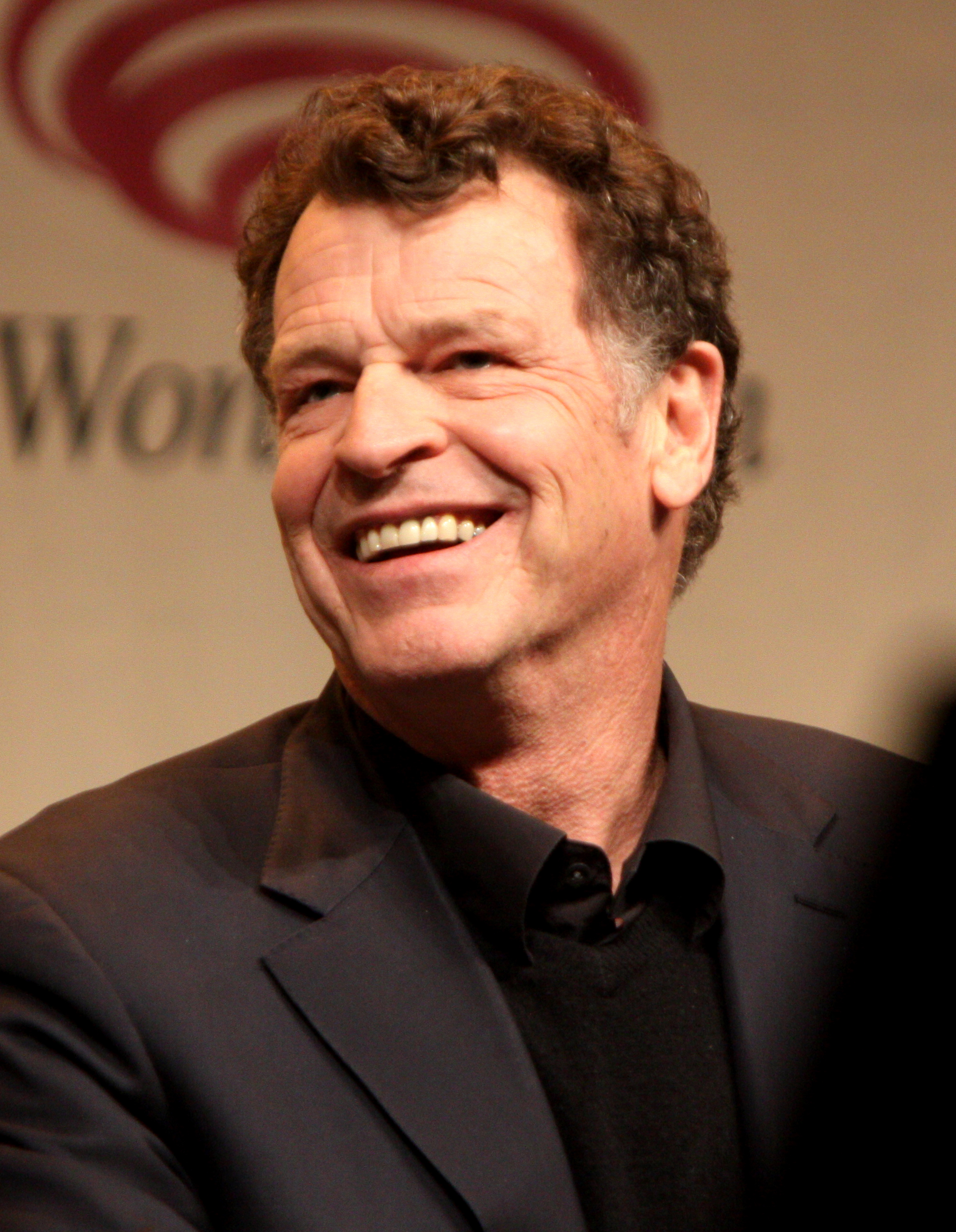
During a season in which they each played at least two versions of their characters, Anna Torv (left) and John Noble were selected for praise.

In December 2010, the New York Times wrote Fringe "has kept its plates spinning entertainingly well into its third season" and called it "the best major-network show that no one is watching". Because of its "ultra-daring" and "bold" storylines, IGN gave Fringe their award for "Best Sci-Fi Series" in 2010. They noted, "With stellar performances, sci-fi intrigue and a newly introduced Doomsday machine in play that almost guarantees the two worlds will face off Thunderdome-style, this series just keeps getting better and better." For 2011, Fringe's third season helped the show place sixth on Digital Spy's top 25 television shows of the year, which described the season as "exemplary". Similarly, The A.V. Club named Fringe the sixteenth best television series of 2011, in particular highlighting "Lysergic Acid Diethylamide" and "The Firefly".

As the third season involved doppelgangers of known characters, specific actors were selected for praise from critics. Lead actress Anna Torv was lauded from multiple quarters for portraying two Olivias, one from each universe. Critics were more divided about her performance as William Bell (Leonard Nimoy), with some praising it and others remaining undecided or critical. John Noble's performances as Walter Bishop and his doppelganger "Walternate" received positive recognition from critics, with one noting he was "astonishing me with every performance." Specific episodes that were isolated for praise among critics included "Entrada", "Subject 13", and "The Day We Died". "Lysergic Acid Diethylamide" was lauded for its risky premise.

In her 2011 book Into the Looking Glass: Exploring the Worlds of Fringe, author Sarah Clarke Stuart noted that the third season's "apocalyptic nature was fitting for an audience in the midst of such seemingly world-ending economic turmoil in 2010–2011." To Clarke Stuart, Walter's remark in the episode "6B" that the world is tearing apart reflected "the sentiments of American viewers who were facing job loss and displacement at an unprecedented level."

=== Awards and nominations ===
For the 1st Critics' Choice Television Awards, it was nominated for Best Drama Series and Anna Torv was nominated for Best Actress in Drama Series. John Noble won for Best Supporting Actor in Drama Series. At Entertainment Weekly's annual viewer-voted EWwy awards, Fringe won for Best Drama, while Torv won for Best Actress in a Drama. Fringe won accolades at the 37th Saturn Awards for Best Network Television Series, Best Actress in Television for Torv, and Best Supporting Actor in Television for Noble.

== Home video releases ==
The third season of Fringe was released on Blu-ray and DVD in region 1 on September 6, 2011, in region 2 on September 26, 2011 and in region 4 on October 26, 2011. The sets includes all 22 episodes of season three on a 4-disc Blu-ray set and a 6-disc DVD presented in anamorphic widescreen. Special features include two commentary tracks—"The Plateau" with Monica Owusu-Breen, Jeff Pinkner and Timothy Good, and "Lysergic Acid Diethylamide" with Jay Worth, Luyen Vu, and Tanya Swerling. Behind-the-scenes featurettes include "Duality of Worlds", a four-part featurette, exploring The Other You, Visualizing an Alternate World, A Machine of Destiny and The Psychology of Duality. Other featurettes include "Animating the 'Lysergic Acid Diethylamide' Episode", "Constructing an Extrasensory Soundscape" and "Experience 'Os' (Episode 316) in Selectable Maximum Episode Mode with Pop-Up Experience-Enhancing Commentaries and Featurettes. Also included are a gag reel and trailers. Exclusive to the Blu-ray release is a featurette titled "Glimmer to the Other Side".
