= Bloodline (Fringe) =

- Fringe episode
- Fauxlivia's pregnancy is accelerated.
- Episode no.: Season 3 Episode 18
- Directed by: Dennis Smith
- Written by: Alison Schapker; Monica Owusu-Breen
- Production code: 3X6118
- Original air date: March 25, 2011

Guest appearances
- Seth Gabel as Lincoln Lee; Kirk Acevedo as Charlie Francis; Ryan McDonald as Brandon; Andre Royo as Henry Higgins; Amy Madigan as Marilyn Dunham; Kendall Cross as Nurse Joyce; Françoise Yip as Dr. Rosa Oporto; Michael Cerveris as September the Observer

Episode chronology
| ← Previous "Stowaway" | Next → "Lysergic Acid Diethylamide" |
- Fringe season 3

"Bloodline" is the eighteenth episode of the third season of the American science fiction drama television series Fringe, and the 61st episode overall. The storyline follows the pregnant Olivia Dunham of the parallel universe ("Fauxlivia") as she experiences a kidnapping and acceleration of her pregnancy; meanwhile, her fellow Fringe agents Lincoln Lee and Charlie Francis attempt to locate her.

The episode's script was written by co-executive producers Alison Schapker and Monica Owusu-Breen, while Dennis Smith directed. "Bloodline" featured the return of guest actors Seth Gabel, Kirk Acevedo, Ryan McDonald, Andre Royo, and Amy Madigan. The Fox network released a "movie-style trailer" in the days leading up to the episode's broadcast as a special promotion.

It first aired in the United States on March 25, 2011, to an estimated 3.9 million viewers. Broadcasting in the wake of a fourth season renewal, the episode's 1.5/5 ratings share was a fifteen percent increase from the previous week. "Bloodline" received mixed to positive reviews from critics, with several commentators characterizing the kidnapping mystery as predictable while also praising the depth of the parallel universe and its characters. Lead actress Anna Torv submitted the episode for consideration at the 63rd Primetime Emmy Awards, but failed to receive a nomination.

== Plot ==
In the parallel universe, Fauxlivia (Anna Torv) is returned home by her mother Marilyn (Amy Madigan) after undergoing a pre-natal test to see if she has viral propagated eclampsia, a virus that killed her sister and sister's baby during childbirth. She believes she is being followed, and contacts Lincoln Lee (Seth Gabel) at the Fringe division, who sends over a security detail. By the time they arrive, Fauxlivia has been kidnapped; though they try to follow a secret tracker each agent carries, her abductors have extracted it to throw Fringe off their tracks. Walternate (John Noble) and Lincoln believe the abduction to be an inside job due to this. Astrid Farnsworth (Jasika Nicole) identifies a vehicle that has passed by Fauxlivia's home at a high frequency, that being the taxi that belongs to Henry (Andre Royo). Lincoln and Charlie (Kirk Acevedo) track down Henry, who explains he has been keeping an eye on Fauxlivia, surprised to have seen her return and seeming like a different person than his previous encounters with her; Henry is unaware that he had actually helped the prime universe's Olivia to escape ("Olivia" and "The Abducted"). Lincoln, suspicious of these events, forces Walternate to admit that Fauxlivia was switched with Olivia, and that the child Fauxlivia carries is his grandchild. Meanwhile, Marilyn learns that Fauxlivia's test for the virus is positive and warns Charlie that Fauxlivia will die if she has the child.

During the Fringe team's search, Fauxlivia finds herself being put under a treatment to accelerate her pregnancy, bringing her child near term. She is able to escape from her captors and contact Fringe division to identify her location, but struggles from labor pains as the child is about to be born. Henry drives Lincoln to her location, and they are able to help Fauxlivia to deliver her child, a son, before medical help arrives. Fauxlivia and her child recover under tight security ordered by Walternate, fearing for their safety. The doctors determine the accelerated pregnancy outpaced the virus, thus allowing both Fauxlivia and her child to survive.

In the epilogue, as September (Michael Cerveris), an Observer, watches, a blood sample from the child is drawn discreetly by one of Fauxlivia's captors posing as an orderly, who transfers it to Brandon (Ryan McDonald), who is revealed to have developed the accelerated pregnancy procedure under Walternate's orders. Meanwhile, Lincoln and Charlie become somewhat distrustful of Walternate after learning what he hid from them. They consider that Colonel Broyles (Lance Reddick) disappeared around the same time that Fauxlivia returned, and wonder what else Walternate is hiding from them.

== Production ==
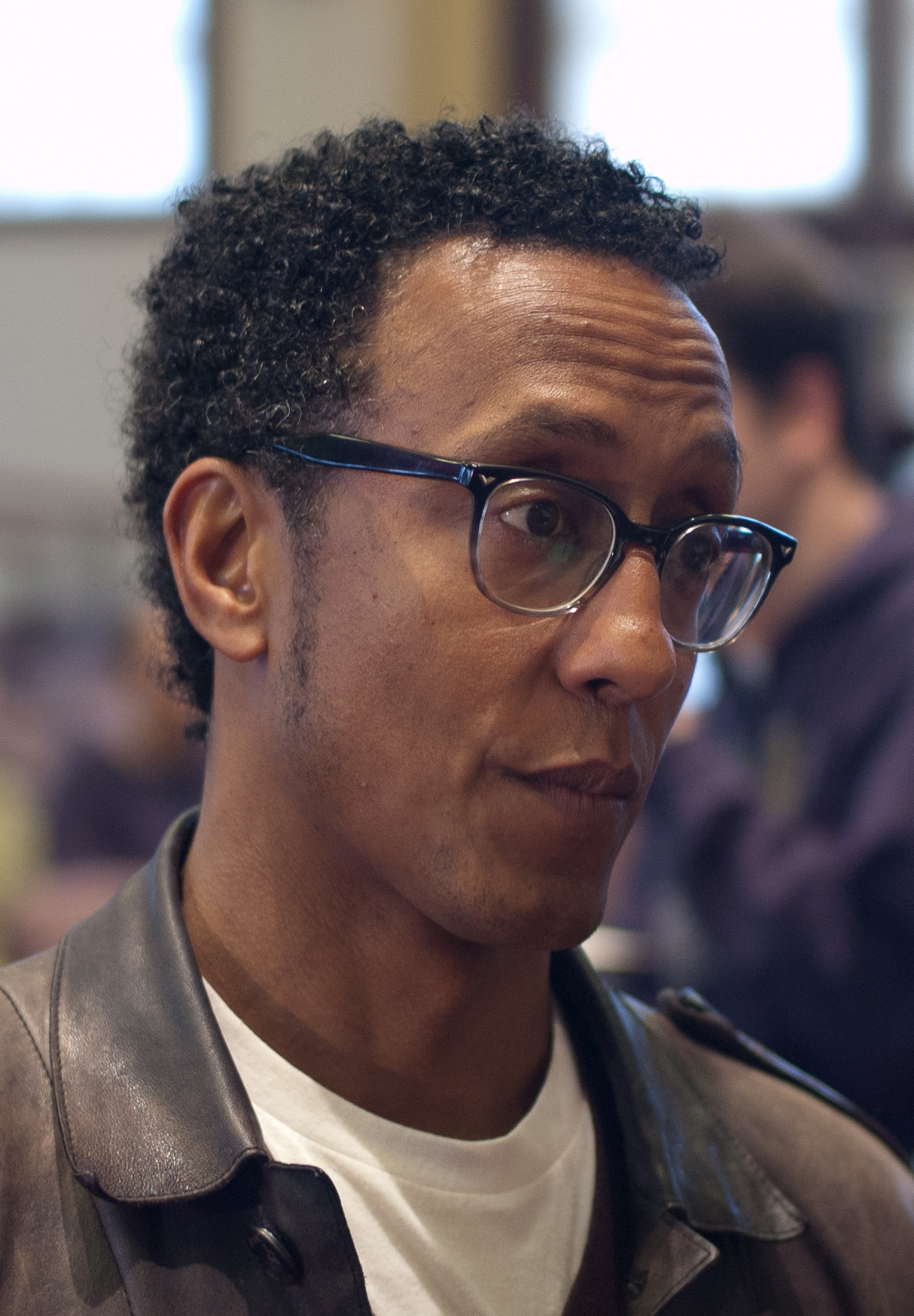
Andre Royo returned as Henry, a cab driver from the parallel universe.

"Bloodline" was co-written by co-executive producers Monica Owusu-Breen and Alison Schapker, while The Practice veteran, Dennis Smith, directed the installment. Editor Timothy A. Good has called "Bloodline" the second of two parts – the first half was the season's third episode "The Plateau", which Owusu-Breen and Schapker also co-wrote. Executive producers Jeff Pinkner and J.H. Wyman had planned Fauxlivia's pregnancy since they conceived her character, but noted that "this isn’t going to be a normal pregnancy that you see, either. And the pregnancy is [going to evolve] in a Fringe way that you don’t comprehend yet. It's not going to be your traditional love triangle, 'I'm pregnant and having a baby' story. It’s going to be Fringe-ified."

In late January 2011, TVLine's Michael Ausiello reported actor Andre Royo was returning for one episode later in the third season. Royo made his third guest appearance of the season in "Bloodline", as cab driver Henry Higgins from the parallel universe. It is his final credit on the series to date. Amy Madigan, who plays Olivia's mother Marilyn, also returned in a guest appearance. Previous guest stars Seth Gabel, Kirk Acevedo, Ryan McDonald, and Michael Cerveris returned as Lincoln Lee, Charlie Francis, Brandon Fayette, and September the Observer, respectively. The episode also featured one-time guest actors Kendall Cross as Nurse Joyce and Françoise Yip as Dr. Rosa Oporto.

Leading up to the episode's broadcast, Fox released a "movie-style trailer" as a promotion, something they had previously done with "Entrada" and "Marionette", two episodes from earlier in the season. The video recapped the Peter/Olivia/Fauxlivia love triangle from Fauxlivia's perspective and then previewed scenes in "Bloodline". As with other Fringe episodes, Fox released a science lesson plan in collaboration with Science Olympiad for grade school children, focusing on the science seen in "Bloodline", with the intention of having "students learn about gestation and how it is different from species to species."

== Cultural references ==
Accelerated growth of yet-unborn children was a major plot element of "The Same Old Story", the second episode of the first season. While eclampsia is a real medical condition that can interfere with childbirth, the "viral-propagated eclampsia" presented in this episode is fictional. When Henry is located by the Fringe division, he is seen reading an Opus the Peahen comic, the parallel universe's counterpart to the Opus comic strip drawn by Berkeley Breathed. Also within the parallel universe, the movie Taxi Driver is shown to have been directed by Francis Ford Coppola rather than Martin Scorsese (though Robert De Niro was still able to improvise the "You talkin' to me?" scene), while the television series The West Wing is shown to be entering its twelfth season.

== Reception ==
=== Ratings ===
"Bloodline" aired the day after Fringe's fourth season renewal was announced by Fox Entertainment, which came in the wake of various actors communicating directly with fans to watch the series. Actor Lance Reddick noted of the renewal, "I know so often fans think that they need us... but I would be digging ditches or something else if it wasn't for you. So — thank you. Really." SFScope columnist Sarah Stegall was surprised but delighted by the network's decision, stating "That any network, let alone Fox, had the patience and the faith to renew this show is, for me, little short of a miracle. It was a week, it seems, for wonders."

"Bloodline" first aired in the United States on March 25, 2011. It was watched by an estimated 3.9 million viewers, earning a 1.5/5 ratings share among the 18–49 demographic, up from the previous episode's 1.3–1.4 rating. This was a 15 percent increase. Fringe helped Fox place in second for the night among adult viewers behind NBC, but the network fell into third place among total viewers behind NBC and ABC.

=== Reviews ===
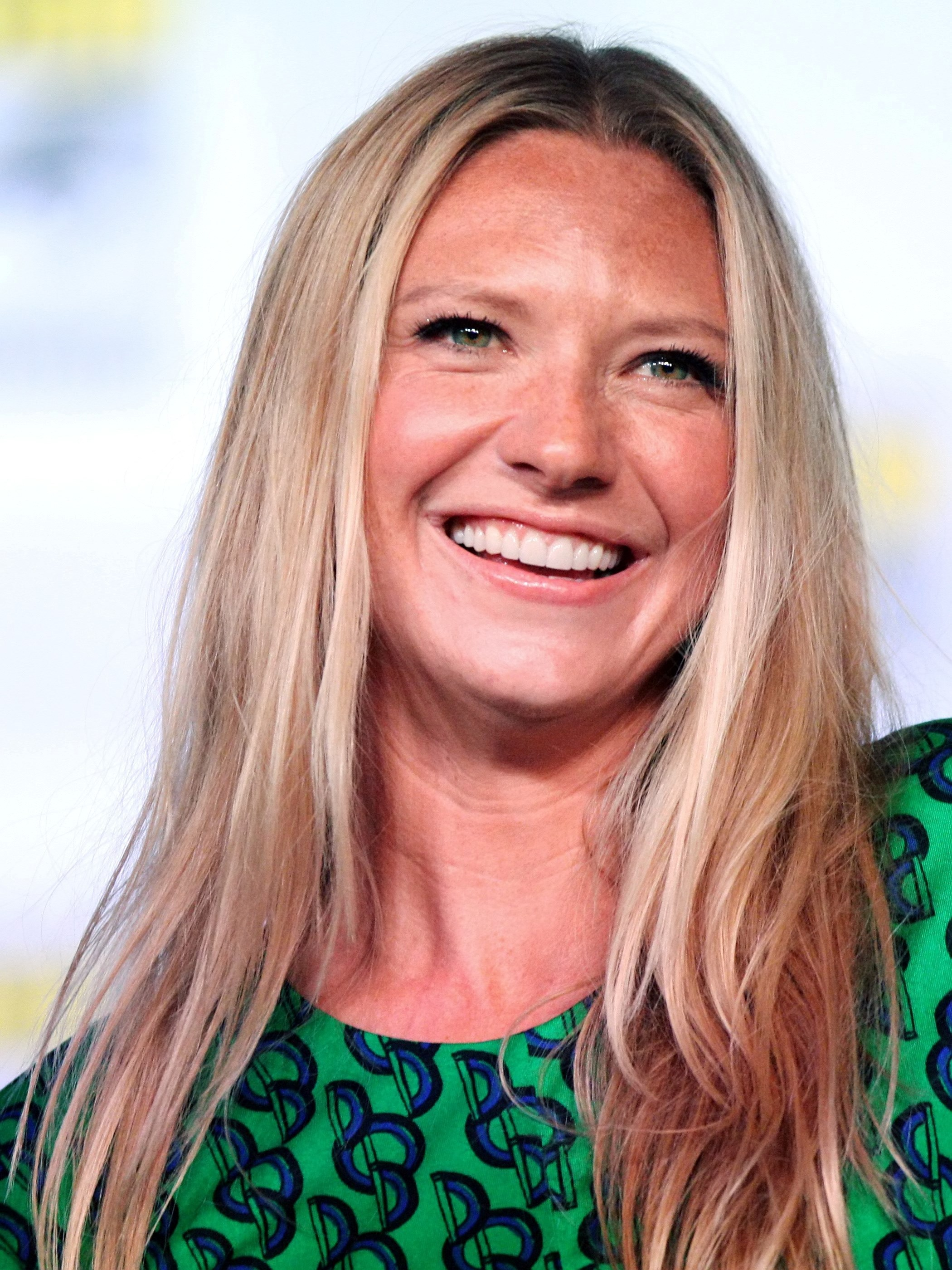
Anna Torv's performance in "Bloodline" was a particular source of praise from critics. She submitted the episode for consideration at the 63rd Primetime Emmy Awards in 2011.

"Bloodline" has received generally mixed to positive reviews from television critics. Sarah Stegall enjoyed it, commenting that "This was one of the more quietly brilliant episodes of Fringe to date. Reaching all the way back to the first season for its genesis, it was still firmly rooted in the most up-to-date events, tied together several characters in a cabal of resistance, paved the way for major drama down the way, and gave us some emotional highlights we cannot expect to see from Our Side characters." Entertainment Weekly staff writer Ken Tucker called the episode "a beautifully modulated hour, written by Alison Schapker and Monica Owusu-Breen, that took care to establish the anxiety felt by Altivia and her mother, Marilyn (Amy Madigan) about the pregnancy."

On a slightly less positive note, Noel Murray of The A.V. Club graded the episode with a B+. He remarked that it "starts out intense and crazy" but "becomes fairly predictable in its second half," as he correctly predicted Walternate's involvement in the abduction. Murray concluded, "Ultimately, 'Bloodline' is more of a plot-mover than most episodes of Fringe. There’s no additional case to solve, and no profound theme to explore. If anything, it’s like the writers decided to inject a serum into the belly of show and accelerate the story, to get Fauxlivia’s baby out and to get on to the next phase." IGN's Ramsey Isler also didn't find the birth storyline all that shocking "since the number of people that had the power and knowledge to do this kind of thing was low." Rating the episode 7.5/10, Isler added that "the story could have used a bit more misdirection and a red herring or two to really keep us guessing, but that's a minor critique. Overall, Walternate's Machiavellian role in this story works, and the most important takeaway from this story is that it moved the overarching plot forward in one huge leap. Instead of waiting nine 'story' months for Fauxlivia's baby to pop out, we've already got the kid ready to fit into whatever plot twist the show runners have planned."

Some television critics have praised the parallel universe's characterization, with one noting that the "writers have made us care about the other side of this war, forced us to see the opposite numbers of our heroes as real and human and sympathetic; it's a brilliant move." The alternate performances of the actors in particular have been highlighted, especially those of Torv and Noble, but also those of Gabel, Acevedo, and Nicole.

=== Awards and nominations ===
Anna Torv submitted "Bloodline", along with the season three episodes "Olivia", "Entrada", Marionette", and "The Day We Died", for consideration in the Outstanding Lead Actress in a Drama Series category at the 63rd Primetime Emmy Awards. She failed to receive a nomination.
