= Olivia (Fringe episode) =

- Fringe episode
- Olivia (Torv) realizes she cannot return home to the prime universe, as the building they used for traveling has become filled with impassable amber.
- Episode no.: Season 3 Episode 1
- Directed by: Joe Chappelle
- Written by: J. H. Wyman; Jeff Pinkner
- Production code: 3X6101
- Original air date: September 23, 2010

Guest appearances
- Kirk Acevedo as Charlie Francis; Seth Gabel as Lincoln Lee; Ryan McDonald as Brandon; Philip Winchester as Frank Stanton; Andre Royo as Henry Higgins; Amy Madigan as Marilyn Dunham; Gerard Plunkett as Senator Van Horn; Gabrielle Rose as Dr. Anderson

Episode chronology
← Previous "Over There (Part 2)"	Next → "The Box"
- Fringe season 3

"Olivia" is the first episode of the third season of the American science fiction television series Fringe. The episode was co-written by J. H. Wyman and Jeff Pinkner, and was directed by Joe Chappelle. The third season spent its time alternating between the prime and parallel universes, and "Olivia" was placed in the latter. This is indicated in the introduction of the episode, with the same red screen used in the last season's finale, "Over There". "Olivia" follows the cliffhanger left by the second season, in which Olivia Dunham is trapped in the parallel universe. The episode explores the consequences of Olivia's abduction by Walternate, and her attempt to go back to the prime universe.

Though Fox was initially worried about an entire episode set in the other universe, they soon came to appreciate the storyline. The episode included the first appearances of guest actors Andre Royo and Amy Madigan, who would both appear in several later episodes. It first aired in the United States on Fox on September 23, 2010, receiving almost all positive reviews due to the combination of emotional storylines, suspense, action, and humor. Many thought it was a good indicator of what the rest of the season had to offer, while others appreciated the numerous popular culture references that set the two universes apart.

== Plot ==
In the previous episode "Over There", Olivia (Anna Torv) and Walter (John Noble) used Olivia's ability to cross from the prime universe into the parallel one, where Walter's son, Peter (Joshua Jackson), was being kept. After dealing with their respective counterparts from the parallel universe, "Fauxlivia" (Torv) and Walternate (Noble), Olivia and Walter were able to successfully free Peter. As they prepared to return to the prime universe, Walternate ordered Fauxlivia to take Olivia's place, returning with Walter and Peter, both unaware of the swap.

Olivia is captured by Walternate's forces, imprisoned in the government facility on Liberty Island and put through both physical and psychological treatments by Walternate to make her believe that she is really the Fauxlivia of the parallel universe. Olivia manages to escape the facility and make it to "Manhatan" (in the Other Side parallel universe, the island is spelled with only one "T"). She coerces a taxi driver named Henry (Andre Royo) to drive her to the Opera House where she believes she can return home, by threatening to harm his family, but by the time she arrives, an "Amber protocol" has been issued, sealing the building in "amber", a substance that the Other Side Fringe Division deploys to envelop time fractures. She directs Henry to the address for Massive Dynamic, but finds the facility does not exist in this universe. As Henry goes to a gas station to fill his taxi, Olivia cries to herself in the station's bathroom.

Meanwhile, the Fringe division is falsely told that their Olivia has escaped. Agent Lincoln Lee (Seth Gabel), still needing hyperbaric treatment to regrow his skin after being burned, and Agent Charlie Francis (Kirk Acevedo) follow a tracking device on Henry's taxi. When they arrive at the station, Olivia orders Henry to drive away, and manages to fire at a small valve on a gas tank, allowing the explosion to cover their trail. Walternate, watching the altercation on monitors, notes Olivia has gained the marksmanship ability that the alternate Olivia possesses, and begins to think the serum is working. Brandon (Ryan McDonald) theorizes in a later conversation that the rush of adrenaline effectively enhanced the potency of his chemical agents to brainwash Olivia.

Henry removes the tracker from his taxi, having become sympathetic towards Olivia. Olivia gives him an address to a "safe house" in a suburban area, and, once there, thanks him and allows him to go. However, Henry remains parked on a nearby street. In the home, Olivia discovers her mother Marilyn (Amy Madigan), who, in the prime universe, had died when Olivia was a teenager. Olivia, seeing her mother and the memories of her mother, cries into her arms, as she is awash in Fauxlivia's memories. By the time Charlie arrives, Olivia fully believes she is Fauxlivia, and after saying goodbye to her mother, returns willingly with Charlie to Fringe headquarters. Henry, after watching Charlie's car pull away, drives off on his own.

The episode closes in the prime universe, where Peter explains the events of his time in the parallel universe to disinterested government agents. Meanwhile, Fauxlivia engages in idle chatter with Walter, nearly slipping and revealing her identity to him due to her lack of knowledge of the prime universe's popular culture. When Peter leaves, he kisses Fauxlivia and the three leave to get dinner.

== Production ==
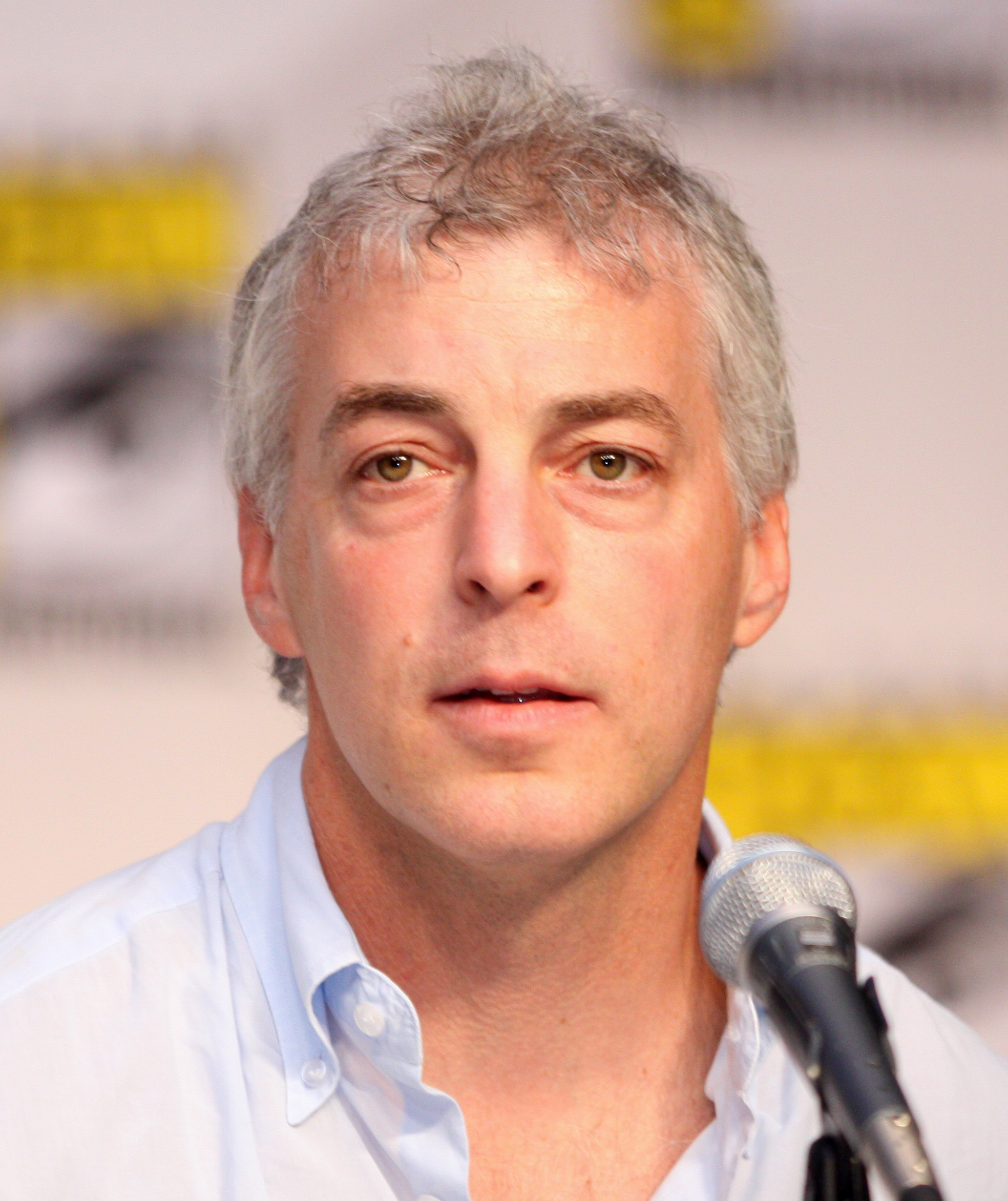
Executive producer Jeff Pinkner co-wrote the episode.

"Olivia" was co-written by co-showrunners J. H. Wyman and Jeff Pinkner, and was directed by co-executive producer Joe Chappelle. The producers revealed the episode title on June 30, 2010. After they began their search in mid-June for a fifty- to sixty-year-old actress to play Olivia's mother, Entertainment Weekly reported on July 2 that Amy Madigan had been cast as Marilyn Dunham for roughly four episodes, beginning with the season premiere. The character was described as "lovely and together" and deeply devoted to her daughter. Further reporting a week later revealed that The Wire actor Andre Royo had been cast for the season premiere as Henry Higgins, "a soulful taxi driver who is unexpectedly forced into a tense situation with Olivia". Henry Higgins is also the name of a character in My Fair Lady. Even before "Olivia" aired, Royo's guest appearance was extended to appear in a second episode. Guest actor Seth Gabel returned as the recurring character Lincoln Lee, and required four to five hours of make-up in order to play a recovering burn victim.

Jeff Pinkner and J. H. Wyman decided to alternate the episodes between the prime and parallel universes because they "thought that the best way to really thoroughly tell these stories was to dive into them wholeheartedly... [in order to fully explore] the journey that our heroine is on and then come back over here because [Altlivia] is embedded in our team, we have point of view characters in both universes and it seemed to us the perfect opportunity to really explore in a really thorough fulsome way the alternate universe". Wyman elaborated that he felt fans "would really appreciate a mythology in two places", and showing both universes "just presented itself in such a natural organic way to evolution in our storytelling". Fox however was initially worried about the premise's sustainability, and that an episode without Peter or Walter "wouldn't feel like our show anymore," to which Pinkner responded that "not unlike a show like Lost, Fringe has to constantly evolve, to move and grow and go forward, otherwise we'll get bored, the cast will get bored, the audience will get bored". After the first three episodes, both Fox and Warner Bros. became more favorable to the storyline.

"There are two levels for us: There's the narrative of having the two Olivias on their respective sides, and then there's the emotional story. We found there was so much power in the emotional story of, yeah, we're able to do something nobody else has done — literally have a character destroyed by a relationship with herself — and we just realized this is a lot of stuff we could use throughout the season. It spawned so many great stories for us emotionally that it became a huge part of the strategy."

— Executive producer J. H. Wyman on the third season's storyline of two Olivias.

When discussing the many differences between the prime and parallel universes in an interview, Pinkner explained that "one of the big themes of the show is how small choices that you make define you as a person and can change your life in large ways down the line". Pinkner and the rest of the Fringe production team loved the opportunity to build an entire new world, and asked themselves what life would have been like in its most mundane forms, such as within daily routines. Pinkner thought it allowed them to create and explore many "what-if" moments, such as if the September 11 attacks had occurred against the White House instead of the Twin Towers, or if the Statue of Liberty still possessed its shiny copper sheen. Pinkner elaborated in another interview that when the "perfectionist" crew were writing and constructing the parallel universe, they spent a lot of time on a high "level of attention and detail" that had all of the different departments and actors weighing in. Pinkner thought that because the parallel universe is effectively breaking down with "World War II"-like conditions, these "sort of tough times forge more noble, stronger people". To better differentiate the two universes, the producers changed the color of the opening credit sequences by making the parallel universe red and the prime universe blue. As with the opening credits in "Peter", the episodes featuring the parallel universe displayed certain fringe science words in that world, including wormholes, speciation, pandemics, and telepathy.

== Cultural references ==
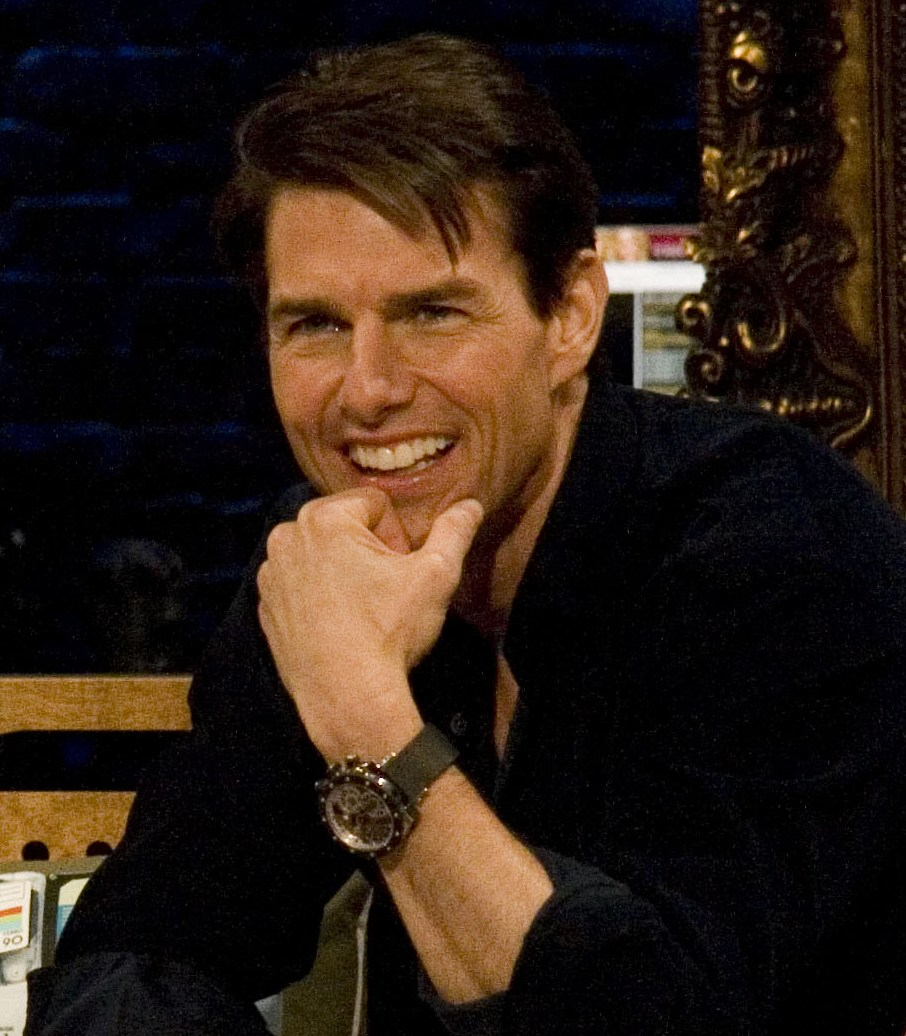
Actor Tom Cruise was mentioned in the episode for being a television actor, rather than a movie star.

Many differences between the two universes were related to popular culture. A photograph of Fauxlivia wearing a gold medal in marksmanship is shown, proving that unlike the prime universe, the parallel universe has that particular event in their Olympic Games. The radio in Henry's taxi can be heard mentioning former president John F. Kennedy is stepping down from his role as ambassador, proving that he was not assassinated. On that same taxi, Dogs is depicted to be a musical in the parallel universe New York City, instead of Cats. Their mail is delivered by the "U.S. Mail Service" with a different logo, instead of the United States Postal Service, and there are apparently daily flights to the moon.

Actor Tom Cruise is mentioned for "kick[ing] ass" on television, implying that he is not a movie star in the parallel universe. When Olivia reminds him she knows his identification information, Henry mentions a "Jedi mind trick", a reference to Star Wars, which is one popular culture similarity the two universes seem to share. When searching for the headquarters of Massive Dynamic, Olivia instead finds a site entitled "Martin Luther King/Eldridge Cleaver Memorial Park", which implies that King was also not assassinated, but instead developed a close relationship with Black Panther militant and Soul on Ice author Cleaver. The park sign also reads "We Have a Dream", which is a slight deviation from King's "I Have a Dream" speech, and suggests that he and Cleaver wrote it together.

As Olivia enters the park, she is passed by a man riding a penny-farthing bicycle. As these have not been shown elsewhere, it does not seem likely that they are a common means of transportation in the alternate universe, but rather that this is a reference to The Prisoner, in which similar mind-games were used against an agent being held prisoner.

In the prime universe, Fauxlivia tells Walter that she has not seen shoes like his Wallabees (a line of shoes from C&J Clark) "in a while," and asks if he is "bringing them back." Walter responds by asking her, "Where did they go?" indicating that they were also found in the alternate universe until some recent time (within Olivia's lifetime), but are no longer found there.

== Reception ==
As with other Fringe episodes, Fox released a science lesson plan for grade school children focusing on the science seen in "Olivia", with the intention of having "students learn about the types of hormones and how they are used to regulate various functions in an organism."

=== Ratings ===
"Olivia" premiered to 5.83 million viewers in the United States, with a 2.1 rating for viewers 18–49. Fringe was down thirty percent from the previous season's premiere, "A New Day in the Old Town". Time shifted viewing gave the premiere a 44% increase, as its 18–49 rating rose to 3.1. Out of all the network shows, this was the largest gain of the week. Time shifted viewing also increased the total number of viewers to 7.837 million. Fringe faced tough competition during its timeslot from the high-rated Grey's Anatomy and CSI: Crime Scene Investigation.

=== Reviews ===
The episode received critical acclaim. Ken Tucker from Entertainment Weekly expected a big event in the vein of the second-season premiere, and was pleasantly surprised to find something different: "a beautifully emotional hour with suspense, humor, and kissing... [that was] superb and surprising". Josh Wigler of MTV wrote that Fringe "proved once again that it's one of the most innovative, entertaining genre shows currently airing on television," and he couldn't wait for next week's episode. Jason Hughes of TV Squad enjoyed the episode, and praised how "the show's creators have come up with a crazy, but fun, way of" showing both universes every other episode.

"...Fringe picked up right where it left us last season and I’ll say it's better than ever. If you’ve been missing out, and want something to plug your genre fix, you must start watching Fringe. The first episode does a fantastic job of bringing new viewers up to speed, while still pushing everything that's good about the show, and providing a gangbusters, edge of your seat episode, to boot."

— UGO Networks critic Alex Zalben

Brooklynne Kelly Peters from Blast Magazine praised Anna Torv's acting, because she "brings a sensitivity to Olivia's character that is heart-wrenching but so well integrated into her character that action scenes seem totally natural for her". The standout for her however, was John Noble's performance, as he played "lovable and brilliant" Walter and "chillingly conniving" Walternate, both of which makes him "an even more unforgettable character" as the audience sees what Walter could have been. The A.V. Club's Noel Murray graded the episode with an A−, writing that "the third season of Fringe opened tonight with one of the strongest, boldest episodes in the whole run of the series". Murray especially praised the "well-written, acted and photographed" taxi scenes between Olivia and Henry. The Los Angeles Times' Andrew Hanson particularly enjoyed the nine-minute opening, writing that he loved the episode because of three reasons: Olivia "kicked butt" and stayed a step ahead of Walternate, her struggles with identity, and all of the careful details put into the parallel universe.

After watching the first several episodes of season three, Aaron Riccio of Slant Magazine gave the show 3.5/4 stars, and praised it for making a "huge, game-changing step forward". He continued that "Hard science meets soft comedy, and the results are consistently surprising and rarely disappointing. The solid mythology and high stakes keep the series moving as forward as quickly as FlashForward and The Event, but the dual tones of the two worlds offer considerably more breadth in the stories it tells... ["Olivia" was] captivating television". Robert Bianco from USA Today praised Torv, Noble, and Jackson's performances. He however disliked the new plotline of two Olivias, explaining "It's hard to fault the execution of the first two episodes, which skillfully set up Fringe's two competing universes and two misplaced Olivias... Yet well-done isn't the same as welcome. I'm not giving up on the show, which was one of last year's best. But I don't want to spend weeks watching our Olivia suffer and their Olivia make Walter and Peter suffer. You have to give writers leeway to take you where they want to go — but at a certain point, commercial entertainment has to be entertaining, or there's no reason to watch".

=== Awards and nomination ===
Anna Torv submitted "Olivia", along with the season three episodes "Entrada", "Marionette", and Bloodline" for consideration in the Outstanding Lead Actress in a Drama Series category at the 63rd Primetime Emmy Awards. She failed to receive a nomination.
