= Marionette (Fringe) =

- Fringe episode
- In one of the episode's memorable scenes, Roland controls Amanda's corpse like a marionette through a system of ropes and pulleys
- Episode no.: Season 3 Episode 9
- Directed by: Joe Chappelle
- Written by: Monica Owusu-Breen; Alison Schapker
- Production code: 3X6109
- Original air date: December 9, 2010

Guest appearances
- Michael Cerveris as the Observer; Mark Ivanir as Roland David Barrett; Barbara Tyson as Mrs. Walsh; Michael Bean as Grant Russo; Anja Savcic as Amanda Walsh; Genevieve Buechner as Tabatha; Elizabeth McLaughlin as Dr. Alexandra Ross

Episode chronology
← Previous "Entrada"	Next → "The Firefly"
- Fringe season 3

"Marionette" is the ninth episode of the third season of the American television series Fringe. The episode was co-written by Monica Owusu-Breen and Alison Schapker, and directed by Joe Chappelle. It followed a series of organ recipients being tracked down and having their donated organs removed, all in a scientist's attempt to resurrect his deceased love interest, whose organs were donated to the victims. Meanwhile, Olivia (Anna Torv) copes with the consequences of being back in the prime universe.

The episode first aired on December 9, 2010, in the United States to an estimated 4.74 million viewers. "Marionette" was the series' winter finale, as well as the last episode to air on Thursdays in the US. It received generally positive reviews. Many critics praised Torv's portrayal of Olivia after her recent trauma, as well as the aftereffects of Fauxlivia's deception, as realistic and well-acted.

== Plot ==
Olivia (Anna Torv) has recovered from her ordeal of being trapped in the parallel universe and has rejoined the Fringe team, while others on the team, particularly Peter (Joshua Jackson), struggle with the idea that the parallel universe's Olivia, Fauxlivia, had successfully pretended to be Olivia. Throughout the episode, Olivia is shown to be struggling emotionally with knowing that Fauxlivia has lived in her apartment and has slept with Peter.

The team is called to the home of a man whose heart was removed through a makeshift operation. They learn that not only did someone call for emergency help shortly after the heart's removal, but the man was found alive by the emergency response team well after his heart was removed, though he eventually died by the time Fringe arrived. Walter (John Noble) and Peter recognize scars on the blood vessels leading to the heart, identifying the victim as one that received a heart transplant. During the autopsy at the lab, Walter concludes that a serum was used to prolong the victim's life well after the heart's removal, a chemical based on his own past research into life restoration.

A second victim is found, this time a man whose eyes have been removed by forced surgery. Again, they discover the eyes were obtained from organ donation, and they find a connection to a woman called Amanda (Anja Savcic), a ballerina who had committed suicide. They also note the care that the culprit performed the work, and speculate that the person they are looking for is showing some compassion for his victims, calling for emergency help and using the serum to hope that they are given the proper care in time. They find that Amanda's alleged cremated remains are bogus, and that her body had been stolen before it could be cremated. They start to trace connections to Amanda, finding she was in a depression counseling support group. Though there are several possible suspects, Olivia's intuition leads her to a man named Roland David Barrett (Mark Ivanir), who was noted to have become enamored with Amanda at the meetings. At Roland's home, he has recovered the corpse and surgically replaced the organs in her body. Using a makeshift set of ropes and pulleys, Roland engages Amanda's body in a marionette act to make her perform like a ballerina, promising her he will bring her back to life.

As the Fringe division sets out to Roland's home, Roland injects Amanda's body with more of the serum, and she is brought back to life. By the time Fringe arrives, Roland gives himself up willingly, and they find Amanda dead again. Roland explains that though she was alive, when he looked into her eyes, he realized she wasn't the same person and thus terminated the process. As Roland and Amanda's body are taken away, Olivia breaks down in front of Peter; she questions that if Roland could tell that Amanda wasn't the same person by looking at her eyes, why couldn't Peter do the same with Fauxlivia? Peter is unable to answer her, and a distressed Olivia leaves on her own. As Walter takes Peter to get a milkshake, the two are identified by an Observer, who reports on his phone that "he is still alive".

== Production ==
"It’s true, 'Entrada' could be construed as a good season-ender, but that was on a physical level. You can anticipate the emotion of what’s going to happen in the return, but the complexities of the end of 'Marionette,' of really that coming to a head, we felt that was a really great story to leave people with: 'Oh, boy, what’s gonna happen now?!'"

— Executive producer J.H. Wyman

The episode was co-written by co-executive producers Alison Schapker and Monica Owusu-Breen, while being directed by executive producer Joe Chappelle. When asked why they chose "Marionette" and not the previous episode "Entrada" as the mid-season finale, co-showrunners Jeff Pinkner and J. H. Wyman stated they were more interested in consequences, such as the repercussions of having both Olivias back in their own worlds. Pinkner explained, "We're always more interested in the 'And then what?' After 'Entrada,' what are the consequences of what we witnessed for the first eight episodes? We very much wanted to play that before the break."

Pinkner and Wyman summarized the episode in an interview, "The headline here is 'Picking up the pieces.' Olivia's had this real Rip Van Winkle experience; while she was away, life went on without her. Now she's back and she's going to find out what happened while she was gone. It's going to shatter her". In a conference call interview, Pinkner and Wyman further described the episode as "pretty fantastic" because "it's one of our most cinematic episodes". "Marionette" ended the episode arc begun in the season premiere, where one episode would take place entirely in one universe and then the following episode would alternate to the other; now Fringe would take place entirely in the prime universe, something that Pinkner deemed "less predictable" for viewers.

The episode featured onetime guest appearances by Mark Ivanir as the puppeteer Roland David Barrett, Anja Savcic as the dead ballerina Amanda Walsh, Barbara Tyson as her mother Mrs. Walsh, Michael Bean as Grant Russo, Genevieve Buechner as Tabatha, and Elizabeth McLaughlin as Dr. Alexandra Ross. Actor John Noble believed Barrett to be "very gifted." Recurring guest star Michael Cerveris also appeared as the Observer.

Noble tweeted live during the episode as part of a special promotion. A week after "Marionette" aired, Fox came out with a promotional video meant to reassure Fringe fans that the show's move to Friday did not automatically mean it was on the road to being canceled. The new video featured the message "You May Think Friday Is Dead… But We're Gonna Reanimate It," a reference to the resurrection plot in "Marionette". As with other Fringe episodes, Fox released a science lesson plan in collaboration with Science Olympiad for grade school children, focusing on the science seen in "Marionette", with the intention of having "students learn about 3-dimensional protein models and how their use allows scientists to predict biological behavior."

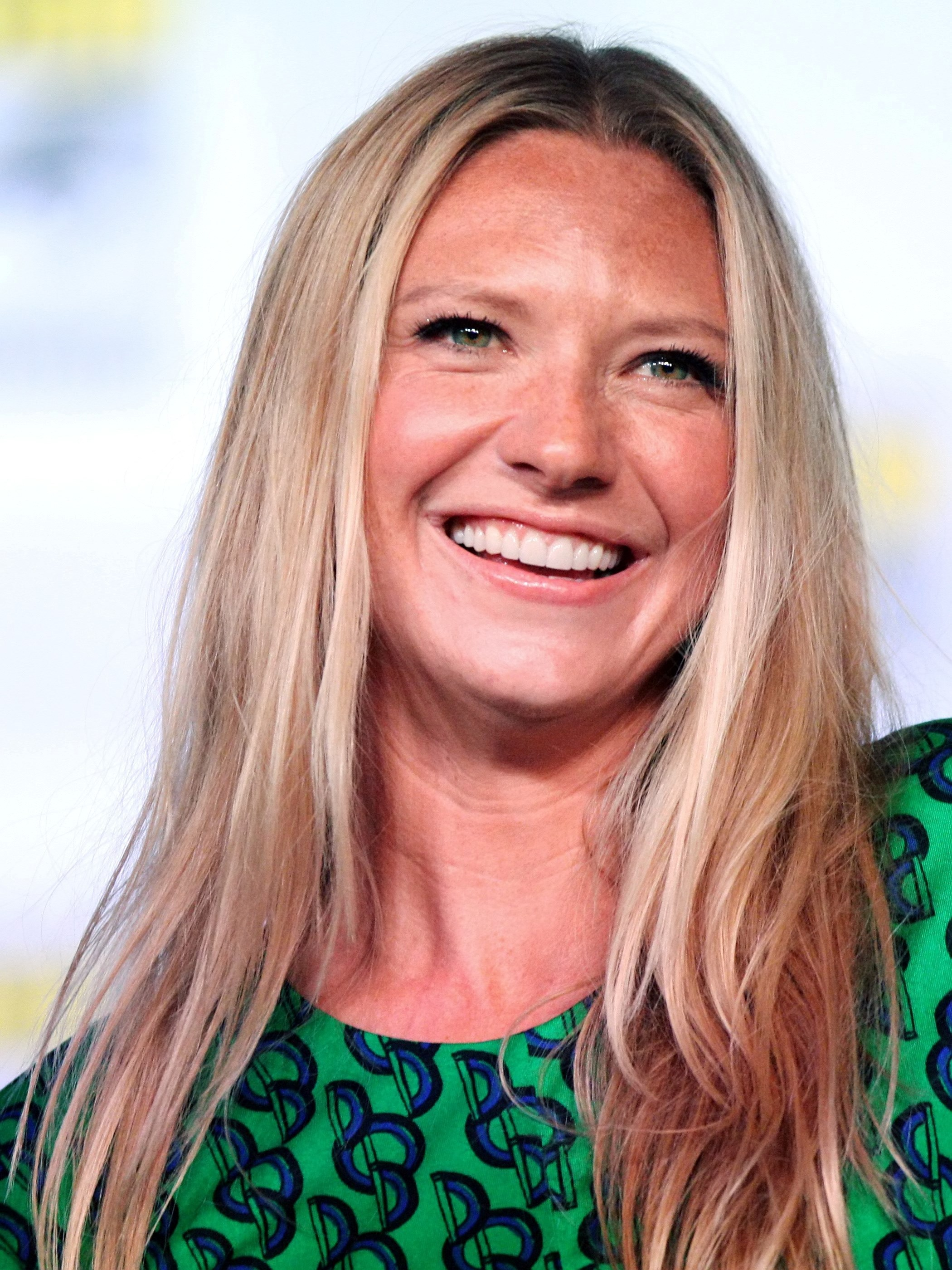
Anna Torv said that of all her time on the series, she was most proud of two scenes in "Marionette".

Lead actress Anna Torv later cited two scenes in "Marionette" of which she was most proud of during her time on Fringe. The first was Olivia's discovery that Peter was sleeping with Fauxlivia and her reaction— going through all of her clothes in disgust; the second related to her comment to Peter that she couldn't "believe that you didn't know it was me." Torv explained,

The reason I love those scenes is because it's really easy to be great in your own bedroom [rehearsing], but when you get on set you have so many different obstacles. The scene with Peter and me outside was done at like 1:30 in the morning, in the middle of town, so we had piles of drunk people screaming up and down the street, and massive fire engines and trucks coming through... We're doing this quiet scene where I have to cry and we're on the clock, but that's what TV teaches you – to just go with it very quickly.

== Reception ==
=== Ratings ===
"Marionette" first aired on December 9, 2010, in the United States on the Fox network. It was watched by an estimated 4.74 million viewers, with a 2.8/4 rating among all households and a 1.7/5 ratings for viewers 18–49. Time shifted viewing increased the episode's ratings by 53 percent among adults, resulting in a rise from 1.7 to 2.6. This was the largest increase of the week in time-shifting viewers. It was Fringe's winter finale, with the next episode airing January 21, 2011. "Marionette" was the last episode to air in its Thursday timeslot, as the series moved to Fridays in the US.

=== Reviews ===
The episode received critical acclaim. Ken Tucker from Entertainment Weekly wrote that despite the "burden" placed on "Marionette" because of its timing, "by now, the series is so sure of its tone, its surging story-telling power, that it more than met its challenges". Tucker believed the show had become "exhilaratingly fearless" by pulling in the many references from literature, movies and other sources, and also thought that Olivia's reaction to the Peter-Fauxlivia relationship "felt right". The A.V. Club's Noel Murray gave the episode an A, explaining that he felt the episode was "very strong" and "was especially impressed with how Fringe handled the Olivia/Peter relationship". Television Without Pity graded the episode a B. Andrew Hanson from the Los Angeles Times called the episode "the perfect epilogue to that first chapter," explaining:

"I’ve always wanted to see more of what happens after the ending of a big action movie. Sure, we’ve defeated the evil alien mothership and saved mankind, but all our cities are blown up. Or we’ve fallen in love while escaping the malfunctioning homicidal robots, but whose side are we spending Christmas with? It isn’t often that you get to see how people move on from these huge events, but “Marionette” gives us just that. Bundled with a retelling of the quintessential horror/sci fi story".

Like Ken Tucker, Hanson also loved how Olivia coped with someone posing as herself, saying that it made her seem like an "honest, real woman". Despite not typically liking "monster-of-the-week" episodes, James Poniewozik of Time Magazine thought it "did quite a good job using the case to tell the story of the tension between Peter and Olivia, and the emotional aftermath of returning to a life someone else has borrowed". Rhea Dee of Pinkraygun.com almost entirely focused on Olivia's reactions to being back in the prime universe. Dee praised the realistic tone, writing that normally in other shows she was used to the female character being "annoying" after trauma, but "not once in this episode did I feel like Olivia’s emotions were irrational".

The staff of Open Salon enjoyed the episode, writing "While I enjoyed the last eight weeks of alternate universe hijinks, this week's episode reminded me of what I had been missing from the earlier seasons... It's nice to know we'll be back with our good old regular Earth-1 team for the foreseeable future. Overall, this week was really well done - very effectively creepy, well directed and plotted with just the right about of gore to make you jump". Jeff Jensen of Entertainment Weekly named "Marionette" the eleventh best episode of the series, calling it "a strong, disturbing outing that was part of Fringe's mid-series peak, in which the show found its best storytelling voice by crafting strange, emotionally resonant case-of-the-week plots that thematically paralleled the ongoing character arcs in ways that felt organic, not contrived." In a similar 2013 list, Den of Geek ranked the episode as the third best of the entire series.

=== Awards and nominations ===
Anna Torv submitted "Marionette", along with the season three episodes "Olivia", "Entrada", and Bloodline" for consideration in the Outstanding Lead Actress in a Drama Series category at the 63rd Primetime Emmy Awards. She failed to receive a nomination.
