= Entrada (Fringe) =

- Fringe episode
- Episode no.: Season 3 Episode 8
- Directed by: Brad Anderson
- Written by: J. H. Wyman; Jeff Pinkner
- Production code: 3X6108
- Original air date: December 2, 2010

Guest appearances
- John Cassini as the Librarian; Seth Gabel as Lincoln Lee; Ryan McDonald as Brandon Fayette; Stefan Arngrim as the Store Owner; Primo Allon as Bartender; Karen Holness as Diane Broyles

Episode chronology
← Previous "The Abducted"	Next → "Marionette"
- Fringe season 3

"Entrada" is the eighth episode of the third season of the American science fiction drama television series Fringe, and the 51st episode overall. The first part of the third season spent much of its time alternating between the prime and parallel universes, and "Entrada" was the first episode of the season to have time evenly divided between both. In the episode, both Olivia and her doppelganger "Fauxlivia" attempt to journey back to their respective universes. John Cassini, Seth Gabel, Ryan McDonald, Stefan Arngrim, and Karen Holness guest starred.

Showrunners J. H. Wyman and Jeff Pinkner wrote the episode as the "culmination of a lot of things that [they] had been working on for quite a while." Calling it one of their favorite episodes, they believed it was a good entry point for new viewers to the series. Frequent Fringe collaborator Brad Anderson returned to direct the episode. "Entrada" first aired on December 2, 2010, in the United States to an estimated 5.13 million viewers. It has been selected for "best episode" lists by various television critics. Both Anna Torv and John Noble submitted the episode for consideration at the 63rd Primetime Emmy Awards, but both failed to garner a nomination.

== Plot ==
At the end of the previous episode, Olivia Dunham (Anna Torv) was able to cross over back to her universe long enough to warn Peter Bishop (Joshua Jackson) she is trapped in the parallel universe. After receiving the message, Peter tests the Olivia from the other dimension, "Fauxlivia", by telling her the Greek phrase Na einai kalytero anthropo apo ton patera tou (roughly, "May he be a better person than his father", which Olivia told Peter in "A New Day in the Old Town"). When Fauxlivia fails to recognize the phrase, Peter confirms his suspicions. Realizing she has been exposed, Fauxlivia forces Peter to inject himself with a paralyzing agent. She then goes to a typewriter store in the Bronx to contact the parallel universe to request an extraction.

After Peter recovers, the Fringe team starts a search for Fauxlivia. Walter Bishop (John Noble) is distressed that he has no idea how to find Fauxlivia and no idea how to bring Olivia back. However, Astrid Farnsworth (Jasika Nicole) discovers Fauxlivia brought Walter malasadas from a bakery in the Bronx. Peter, Walter, Farnsworth and Phillip Broyles (Lance Reddick) search the nearby area, Peter finds the typewriter store and the team finds the typewriter used to contact the other universe (a "quantum entanglement" device). There, the team realizes that Fauxlivia is going to a train station in Newark for a 4:00 PM pick-up.

Meanwhile, in the parallel universe, "Walternate" (Noble) plans on using Olivia's body in order for her alternate self to return home, as it would require a person of Olivia's mass to complete the transfer. However, Walternate arranges for Olivia's brain to be removed for further study on how to traverse universes safely. Before she is to start the operation, Olivia receives a visit from Colonel Broyles (the alternate universe's counterpart to her FBI supervisor), who is still grateful to Olivia for helping his son. Olivia convinces him that her universe is not at war with theirs; the troubles started not from any hostile action, but only as an accidental side-effect of Walter's initial crossing to save Peter. Broyles later talks with his wife and then returns to Liberty Island to save Olivia. Together, the two reach the immersion tank that Olivia used earlier, but find it empty. As a back-up plan, the two travel to Walternate's long abandoned lab at Harvard to use the sensory deprivation tank. Broyles reveals there is a GPS tracker in him, but manages to buy Olivia enough time to successfully return to her universe.

As this transpires, Fauxlivia meets with a shapeshifter at the station to inject her with resonating rods. By that time, Broyles and Peter arrive at the station. To ensure her escape, Fauxlivia holds a hostage. However, Peter realizes the hostage is the shapeshifter when the hostage is unable to state the name of "her" nearby daughter. Peter shoots the shapeshifter in the head, killing it, and Fauxlivia is arrested. Later, the team learns that their own Olivia has returned. However, Fauxlivia still manages to escape back to her universe, leaving behind the mutilated body of the alternate counterpart of Broyles to make up for her mass. While Peter and Olivia reunite at a hospital, the typewriter store owner trades a piece of the doomsday device in exchange for the restoration of his paralyzed legs.

== Production ==
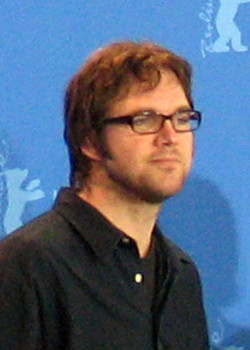
Filmmaker Brad Anderson returned to direct the episode.

"Entrada" was written by executive producers Jeff Pinkner and J. H. Wyman. Filmmaker and frequent Fringe collaborator Brad Anderson returned to direct the episode, shooting it in September 2010 on New Westminster's Front Street in Vancouver and in a train station. The special effects crew used a prosthetic body resembling actor Lance Reddick, minus a certain amount of mass equal to Anna Torv; they did research to find out how much a human leg typically weighs, finding the number to be around 20 percent of a body's mass.

The third season spent much of its time alternating between the prime and parallel universes, and "Entrada" was the first episode of the season to have time divided between both. This was reflected in the opening credits, which were red and blue in a season that had previously differentiated each universe with one exclusive color.

Pinkner and Wyman revealed in a conference call interview that the episode was the "culmination of a lot of things that [they] had been working on for quite a while". Though they loved all of their episodes, the two stated that "Entrada" was a particular favorite of theirs, with Pinker elaborating that "if the only episode of Fringe you ever tune into watch is this one, sure, it's going to take you five minutes to catch up, but you will feel what's going on, and you will understand the relationships ... [It's] a great entry point". The producers considered making "Entrada" the mid-season finale, but instead selected "Marionette", the following week's episode.

The episode featured appearances by recurring guest stars Karen Holness as Phillip Broyles' wife Diane, John Cassini as the Store Owner, and Ryan McDonald as scientist Brandon Fayette. Seth Gabel also returned to guest star as Lincoln Lee, an agent from the parallel universe.

In a departure from previous Fringe trailers, Fox created and premiered a "grandiose movie-style" trailer at Entertainment Weekly's website to celebrate the airing of "Entrada". Pinkner explained that the trailer idea did not come from his production team, but rather was produced by a Fox division called Special Ops, who came up with the idea in order to platform Fringe to the audience in a way they had not seen before. As with other Fringe episodes, Fox released a science lesson plan in collaboration with Science Olympiad for grade school children, focusing on the science seen in "Entrada", with the intention of having "students learn about scientific intuition and how it can facilitate the scientific method of collecting data through experimentation and observation in order to formulate and test a hypothesis".

== Reception ==
=== Ratings ===
The original broadcast of "Entrada" occurred on December 2, 2010, in the United States. According to Nielsen ratings, it was watched by an estimated 5.13 million viewers, earning a 3.2/5 share among all households and a 1.8/5 share among viewers aged 18–49. This latter demographic was down five percent from the previous episode that aired on November 18. Entertainment Weekly writer Lynette Rice remarked of the low ratings, "If this genre series were on AMC (or featured zombies), the media world would be calling it a monster hit. Sadly, the threshold for success is far different on broadcast TV, so Fringe will always be viewed as a niche performer with a small but rabid fan base."

Seven days after its broadcast on time shifted viewings, "Entrada" was seen by an additional 1.7 million, pushing the total viewership up to 6.87 million with a 2.6 rating among those 18–49.

=== Critical reception ===
The episode received critical acclaim. James Poniewozik of Time magazine wrote, "While it may not have been the high point that the emotional "Peter" from earlier this year was, "Entrada" was a pretty excellent action-focused episode, in which the dimensional swap between Fauxlivia and Realivia came to a head. In the process, it demonstrated that Fringe's writers have made a compelling world out of Over There in a relative few episodes—and it was another example of what a strong series Fringe has become since its committed fully to its clash-of-the-universes storyline ... All in all, a satisfying hour and a good demonstration of how Fringe—one of the most improved shows of the past season or so—has grown into one of TV's most entertaining dramas".

I hesitate to brand any single episode of a complicated series as Best Episode Ever, but this week comes darned close. In a season marked by outstanding writing, this hour of Fringe brilliantly resolved several ongoing storylines, while at the same time bringing to the fore some long-simmering conflicts which will enrich the next half-season. All while keeping the pace and the emotional tension at a rolling boil. For me, television just does not get better than this kind of science fiction, balancing the gee-whiz Big Idea with the small and intimate moments between characters that make them real and vital.

— SFScope reviewer Sarah Stegall

Ken Tucker from Entertainment Weekly noted that the episode "closed a Fringe chapter in bringing Olivia back, while opening up all sorts of fresh new possibilities for the future. Both Olivias are changed women with new amounts of information about their opposing universes, and thus will be able to influence their Walters in how to proceed henceforth. The series can resume plot threads that have been given scant attention in recent weeks, such as Walter's takeover of Massive Dynamic, and what I'm hoping will be an increased presence by Nina Sharp, whose role in the interuniverse machinations is ripe for exploration".

Writing for SFScope, Sarah Stegall praised Reddick's performance as both Colonel Broyles, and Torv's "tour-de-force" performance as Olivia and her doppelganger. She also noted how strong of a show Fringe has evolved into, lauding the producers' decision to focus on the show's "strongest and most innovative plot": the parallel universe. Stegall expressed hope that Fauxlivia's experiences in the prime universe would lead her to challenge Walternate's more militant actions to destroy it. Stegall further recognized the episode's editing, as "a complicated story like this one could have been endlessly confusing, with multiple versions of the same character, two extremely similar universes, and plot points reaching back to the first season. Yet the writing and direction kept it all sorted out, without resorting to voice-overs, flashbacks, or other lame expository devices. This is classy, tight writing, and my hat's off to the entire team". Television Without Pity graded the episode an A+. Noel Murray at The A.V. Club gave it an A- highlighting Torv's performance.

It topped several "best episode of 2010" lists, including Den of Geek, Give Me My Remote, and TV.com. Jeff Jensen of Entertainment Weekly named "Entrada" the fifth best episode of the series, calling it "the sensational climax to season 3's sensational Olivia/Fauxlivia parallel universe interplay, which seemed to bring out the best in both the writers of Fringe as well as its actors, especially Anna Torv, who rocked the tricky material and created a convincingly distinct and unique doppelganger iteration of Olivia. She deserved an Emmy nomination for her work this season. Oh, well."

== Cultural references ==
In the parallel universe, Penn Station in Newark, New Jersey, is called "Springsteen Station", likely indicating that prime universe native son Bruce Springsteen also exists "over there".

=== Awards and nominations ===
Anna Torv submitted "Entrada", along with the season three episodes "Olivia", "Marionette", and "Bloodline" for consideration in the "Outstanding Lead Actress in a Drama Series" category at the 63rd Primetime Emmy Awards. She failed to receive a nomination. John Noble also submitted "Entrada", along with episodes "The Firefly" and "The Day We Died", for consideration in the "Outstanding Supporting Actor in a Drama Series category", but did not receive a nomination.
