= Amber 31422 =

- Fringe episode
- Episode no.: Season 3 Episode 5
- Directed by: David Straiton
- Written by: Josh Singer; Ethan Gross
- Production code: 3X6105
- Original air date: November 4, 2010

Guest appearances
- Kirk Acevedo as Charlie Francis; Seth Gabel as Lincoln Lee; Shawn Ashmore as Joshua Rose; Aaron Ashmore as Matthew Rose; Holly Dignard as Danielle Rose; Amy Madigan as Marilyn Dunham; Ryan McDonald as Brandon; Nathan Bell as Rose's son

Episode chronology
| ← Previous "Do Shapeshifters Dream of Electric Sheep?" | Next → "6955 kHz" |
- Fringe season 3

"Amber 31422" is the fifth episode of the third season of the American science fiction drama television series Fringe. It first aired on November 4, 2010 in the United States. The third season spent its time alternating between the prime and parallel universes, and "Amber 31422" was set in the latter. Olivia, still trapped in the Other Side and brainwashed, investigates the Rose brothers, who are able to do the seemingly impossible: escape from an amber-like substance used to contain fringe events.

The episode was written by Josh Singer and Ethan Gross, and directed by David Straiton. An estimated 4.97 million viewers watched "Amber 31422", which up to that point were the lowest ratings of the season. Critics were generally positive, and many praised the cast's performances as well as the Rose brothers' storyline.

== Plot ==
Olivia is still trapped in the parallel universe, under Walternate's (a doppelgänger of Walter Bishop) conditioning to believe she is her doppelgänger from Over There and part of its Fringe team. Throughout the episode, she willingly participates in Walternate's tests in a sensory-deprivation tank located on Liberty Island to stimulate her Cortexiphan abilities. One test is successful, as she temporarily finds herself in a gift shop on Liberty Island in the prime universe. Meanwhile, hallucinations of FBI consultant and colleague Peter continue to bother Olivia.

The Fringe team is alerted to an incident at a quarantine site, where the amber encasing the site has been cut into and a body has been removed. They identify the missing body as Joshua Rose, a former bank robber. Joshua had previously caught Fringe Division's attention as he used a molecular destabilization device to break into banks, triggering quarantine-level events. Colonel Broyles is privately cautioned by Walternate that those trapped in amber are still alive, a fact he does not want to be made public for fear of an outcry. Broyles relays this to his team, requesting they find Rose and bring him in as quickly as possible.

At Joshua's apartment, they discover he has a twin brother Matthew and equipment used for a negative matter ring. Their investigation is cut short as they are forced to evacuate from a rigged bomb which destroys the apartment as they flee. Lee and Francis were unable to hear the bomb, but Olivia could, possibly indicating that she retains the enhanced hearing demonstrated in "Night of Desirable Objects." They travel to Matthew's home in the suburbs, meeting the brother, his wife, and their children. Matthew professes to no knowledge of the location of his brother. Olivia is suspicious of Matthew's behavior but does not explore further. Olivia's suspicion is shown to be correct as Matthew is revealed to have been the one trapped in the amber, having tried to come warn his brother about the quarantine. Joshua, having posed as Matthew for the last few years, was the one that freed him and spoke to Fringe. The brothers switch places again when Olivia requests a more detailed identity check from Matthew, which he passes successfully.

Believing Joshua will attempt another break-in but will avoid putting innocents in danger, Olivia has Fringe Division statistician Astrid identify three remotely located banks and decides to investigate them. Olivia finds the bank that Joshua has targeted and discovers his device in a subway tunnel, but he knocks her out before she can investigate further. As he energizes the molecular destabilizer, Fringe Division detects the event and converges on the bank. Matthew eventually finds Joshua, again trying to warn him off, but quickly realizes Joshua has purposely entered the bank to be trapped in the amber. Joshua believes this to be the only way to force the Fringe team to end their investigation. Matthew escapes the quarantine while Fringe agents Charlie and Lincoln rescue Olivia in time before the amber sets in. Olivia returns to Matthew the next day and confirms the case is closed, but not before collecting a skin sample that, should she ever need it, conclusively proves that it was Matthew in the amber before.

As the episode ends, Olivia's hallucination of Peter points out to her that there is a way to tell if she is from the prime universe: by confirming her memories of her niece Ella, who did not survive birth in the parallel universe. During Olivia's final test in the tank, she is again able to cross over to the gift shop in the prime universe. She is able to recall Ella's phone number and calls her, but is brought back to the parallel universe shortly after Ella answers. As she is removed from the tank, she lies, telling Walternate the test did not work.

== Production ==
Co-executive producer Josh Singer and story editor Ethan Gross co-wrote the episode, while David Straiton served as the director. The third season spent its time alternating between the prime and parallel universes, and "Amber 31422" was set in the latter.

"Amber 31422" was the first project guest actors and brothers Shawn Ashmore and Aaron Ashmore had worked on together in fifteen years. Shawn said in an interview that "it’s usually because the stuff that came along is kind of hokey, but I think the quality of Fringe is really high and the episode is done well and our characters are intelligent. We’re going to have some fun." Holly Dignard guest starred as Danielle Rose, while recurring guest actors Amy Madigan and Ryan McDonald returned as Marilyn Dunham and Brandon Fayette, respectively. Seth Gabel and former series regular Kirk Acevedo reprised their characters Lincoln Lee and Charlie Francis, Fringe Division agents from the Other Side.

The episode was scheduled to air three weeks after the previous episode, as the Major League Baseball playoffs were underway until November 11 at the latest, though the lack of a sixth and seventh game at the World Series allowed the episode to air a week earlier, on November 4. As with other Fringe episodes, Fox released a science lesson plan in collaboration with Science Olympiad for grade school children, focusing on the science seen in "Amber 31422", with the intention of having "students learn about the process of fossilization and identification of species from incomplete information."

== Cultural references ==
In the parallel universe, Lincoln Lee mentions that it was Cary Grant, and not Humphrey Bogart, who starred in The Maltese Falcon. After Olivia arrives late to a crime scene, Lincoln chides her for driving on the "Nixon Parkway," a reference to former president Richard Nixon. The tank Walternate uses to submerge Olivia has been noted by some critics to closely resemble a similar device in the 1980 science fiction film Altered States, which also starred Fringe actress Blair Brown. Walternate tells Broyles he first began the amber protocol on October 17, 1989, which was the same day as the 1989 Loma Prieta earthquake in our side's San Francisco Bay region.

== Reception ==
=== Ratings ===
"Amber 31422" was watched by an estimated 4.97 million viewers in the United States. The episode had a season low rating of 1.8/5 among viewers 18–49, which was down 10% from the previous episode that aired on October 14. Between Fringe and its lead-in show Bones, Fox finished in third place for the night. The Fringe episode's low ratings have been attributed by critics to the unexpected end to the 2010 World Series, which caused Fringe to air a week earlier than expected. Den of Geek columnist Billy Grifter attributed the low ratings to the parallel universe focus, commenting "if you weren't a fan beforehand, you'll not be able to follow what's going on now. For those of us that did step onto the Fringe elevator early, it's a great ride, but I can see that it's a difficult proposition to attract new viewers." Time shifted viewing increased the episode's ratings by 44 percent among adults, resulting in a rise from 1.8 to 2.6.

=== Reviews ===
"Walter Bishop (our Walter) invented Cortexiphan as a biological means to open the doors between universes; Walternate developed Amber 31422 to close those doors. Olivia came over to the Red universe to save Peter Bishop; now an avatar of him in her mind may be her salvation... I love the depth and sophistication of this kind of character development, which works itself so seamlessly into the plot and the underlying arc. A plot device from the first season now emerges as a major player in the Red universe stories; a passing moment of trivia between Nina and Olivia now takes on enormous significance in the snow globe. This level of characterization, attention to detail over three seasons, and depth of plotting makes Fringe a classic, a show which is hitting its stride."

— SFScope reviewer Sarah Stegall

The episode received mostly positive reviews from television critics. Noel Murray of The A.V. Club graded the episode with a B−, explaining that "after four solid weeks of good-to-great episodes, Fringe delivered its first semi-dud of season three" because the case-of-the-week was "dull" and "twistless", and the dialogue was "too flat and too earnest". Despite this, Murray thought the episode was "essential viewing" for Fringe fans due to certain revelations, such as how people are actually alive in the amber, and also because it moved the plot closer to an Olivia-Altlivia confrontation. Conversely, the Los Angeles Times' Andrew Hanson thought it was a good episode, writing "This is what I love about Fringe. Not only do they have the cool science, they also have the moral questions that go along". Ken Tucker from Entertainment Weekly thought the episode was "enthralling," and he enjoyed the brothers' "nice emotional story," and praised Anna Torv's acting. TV Squad reviewer Jason Hughes enjoyed the parallel universe, and in particular the character of Lincoln Lee, believing he was "too rich a character to just abandon" once the series stopped alternating between universes.

Fearnet's Alyse Wax wrote, "I definitely think that this was the best "over there" episode they have had so far. They had an actual case, rather than still setting up who these doppelgangers are." HitFix writer Ryan McGee thought the initial twist over the brothers' identities "was fun", though it "grew old quickly". He praised the series for not "dragging out" Olivia discovering her true identity, explaining "While episodes set Over There are delicious fun, having Olivia unaware for a long stretch would have strained credibility and perhaps damaged audience opinion of her character’s integrity." Writing for Den of Geek, Billy Grifter commented, "I have three words for the latest Fringe episode, and they're all 'brilliant'. Season three has moved gracefully, like a big cat stalking its prey, from the outset, playing a flipside game where we cleverly alternate between our universe and an alternate one where Olivia is currently resident." Grifter praised the Ashmore brothers' acting as well as their characters' storylines, calling their switch "a nice twist that's cleverly played".
