= Michael Bean =

Canadian actor

- Born: Vancouver, British Columbia, Canada
- Occupations: Actor, author, owner of Biz Studio, acting coach
- Years active: 2002–present
- Website: michaelbean.ca

Michael Bean is a Canadian actor, author, acting coach, and the founder of Biz Studio. He is known for his work on the films Case 39 (2009), The Imaginarium of Doctor Parnassus (2009), The Day the Earth Stood Still and Jennifer's Body (2009), and for guest spots on the television series Arrow, Pretty Little Liars, Supernatural and Smallville.

== Early life ==
Bean has been acting since elementary school, as a fine arts school was built two blocks from his house when he was in the fourth grade. He graduated from the Langley Fine Arts School in 1995.

== Career ==
Bean is an actor, author, acting school owner, and acting coach. He has appeared in a diverse range of roles in television and film since his acting career began in 2006. He has also appeared in a few theatrical productions, including: Proof, Shady Business, Bash Plays, Hard Times Hit Parade, and Theatre Sports. and is the author of "Confidence on Camera: A Handbook for Young Actors", which is used by many Vancouver talent agents as a primer for clients new to the film industry.

=== Television ===
Bean has made appearances in several television shows since 2006, appearing in a diverse range of minor roles that include: scientist (The Whispers, 2015), train station official (Intruders, 2014), lawyer (Motive, 2014), doctor (Falling Skies, 2014), secretary (Arrow, 2013), pastor (Supernatural, 2009), minister (Pretty Little Liars, 2010), grief counselor (Reaper, 2009), husband (Eureka, 2007), volunteer (The Guard, 2008), receptionist (Smallville, 2007), lab technician (The 4400, 2006), and monk (Three Moons Over Milford, 2006).

=== Film ===
Bean has been appearing in film since 2006. His film credits include: Festival (2006), Canes (2006), Breakup.com (2008), The Imaginarium of Doctor Parnassus (2009), Jennifer's Body (2009), Love Happens (2009), The Big Year (2011), and Dead Rising: Watchtower (2015).

=== Biz Studio ===
Bean founded Biz Studio—a professional screen acting school for children and teenagers—in 2002 in an effort to "prepare young actors to audition and work in BC's film and television industry by providing professional, practical, small-group on-camera training".

Located in Vancouver, British Columbia, Canada's Beatty St. studios, Biz Studio features additional instructors who are overseen by Bean, some of whom have included the late Julie Patzwald (1980 - 2012), Alison Araya, Laura Bertram, and Stephanie Halber. The instructors teach classes for three different age groupings and see many of their students go on to perform in film, television, and commercials.

One goal for Biz Studio is "to demand the highest level of performance from our students, while still encouraging their love of acting by balancing discipline with fun. We are passionate about good acting. And fun."

Alumni of Biz Studio have included Brett Kelly (Bad Santa, Unaccompanied Minors), Montana Hunter, Megan Charpentier (Frankie + Alice, Resident Evil: Retribution), Haley Hunt, and Sean Roche (The Guard).

== Filmography ==
Year	Title	Role	Other Notes
2017	Haters Back Off	Gallery Owner	TV series
2015	Impastor	Jonathan Barlow	Guest
2015	The Whispers	Scientist 2	TV series
2015	Dead Rising: Watchtower	Army Surgeon	
2014	Intruders	Train Station Official	TV series
2014	Motive	Lawyer	TV series
2013	Sky Dome	Sydney Scott	TV series
2013	Mister Forgettable	Steve	Short
2013	Falling Skies	Dr. Sumner	TV series
2013	Arrow	Secretary	TV series
2011	The Big Year	Waiter	
2011	While I Breathe	Kingpin	Short
2010	Fringe	Grant Russo	TV series
2010	Hiccups	Michael Winthrop	TV series
2010	Pretty Little Liars	Minister	TV series
2009	Supernatural	Pastor	TV series
2009	Love Happens	Concierge	
2009	Jennifer's Body	Priest	
2009	Case 39	Co-Worker	
2009	The Imaginarium of Doctor Parnassus	Dancing Policeman	
2009	Reaper	Grief Counselor Dave	TV series
2008	The Guard	Volunteer	TV series
2008	Breakup.com	James	
2008	Skies Falling	Mr. Kelly	Short
2007	Eureka	Husband	TV series
2007	Painkiller Jane	Edgar Dawson	TV series
2007	Smallville	Receptionist	TV series
2006	The 4400	Lab Technician	TV series
2006	Three Moons Over Milford	Monk	TV series
2006	Canes	Jonathan	
2006	Festival	Jerry Bean	
