= Andre Royo =

American actor, producer, and writer

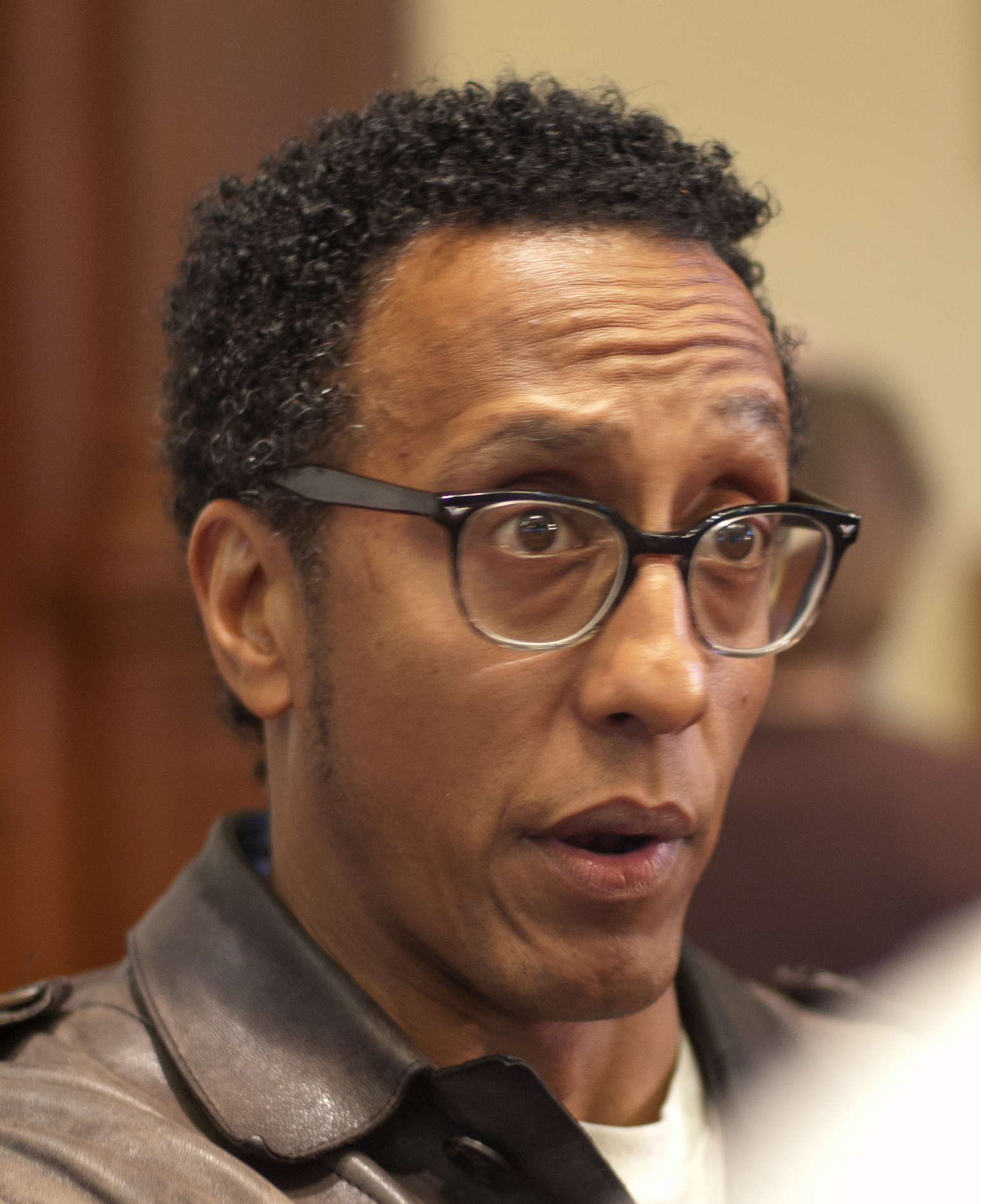
- Royo at Harvard Law School in 2010
- Born: July 18, 1968 (age 58); New York City, New York, U.S.
- Occupations: Actor; producer; writer
- Years active: 1998–present
- Height: 170 cm (5 ft 7 in)
- Spouse: Jane Choi
- Children: 1

Andre Royo (born July 18, 1968) is an American actor, producer, and writer. He is best known for his role as Reginald "Bubbles" Cousins on the HBO crime drama series The Wire, and his appearances on Fringe, Party Down, How to Make It in America, and the 2013 film The Spectacular Now. Royo also appeared as Lucious Lyon's defense attorney Thirsty Rawlings on the Fox drama series Empire.

== Personal life ==
Royo was born in the borough of the Bronx in New York City on July 18, 1968, and is of African-American and Cuban heritage. According to Royo, in auditions he had been told by some casting directors that he was "not Black enough" or "not Latino enough" for certain parts.

Royo attended Mount Saint Michael Academy in The Bronx from 1982 until 1986. Royo is married to Jane Choi and they have one daughter named Stella.

== Career ==
Royo made his acting debut in a minor role in the 1998 film L.A. Without a Map. In 1999, he made one-episode guest appearances on the television series Law & Order and Third Watch. Additionally, in the Law & Order episode 'Prince of Darkness', Royo can be seen sitting in the audience of the courtroom, directly behind the defendant. In 2000, he had a small role in John Singleton's remake of the 1971 blaxploitation film Shaft. He also appeared in the 2002 movie G, which was based on The Great Gatsby.

Royo is mostly known for his starring role on the HBO crime-drama series The Wire as the drug addict and confidential informant Reginald "Bubbles" Cousins, a regular character since the show's first season. Royo's portrayal of this character was so convincing that, during on-location filming, he was once approached by a Baltimore resident and given a small package of heroin, with the man saying to the in-character Royo: "Man, you need this more than I do." Royo has called this incident his "street Oscar."

In 2008, he made a brief appearance in Terminator: The Sarah Connor Chronicles as a soldier in a unit that was sent back in time. That same year, he was introduced as the character Stephen Canfield during the third season of the television series Heroes. In 2008, Royo also played the role of a drug addicted homeless serial killer in the Criminal Minds season 4 episode "Catching Out".

In October 2009, Royo was featured at a Harvard University panel discussion along with other actors from The Wire, Sonja Sohn and Michael K. Williams. The panel discussed the value of The Wire as a media source that at-risk youth can relate to and learn positive life lessons from. In 2010, Royo guest starred on the Starz original series Party Down. Later that year, he was a guest star in the third season premiere as well as the seventh and eighteenth episodes of the Fox television series Fringe, playing a cab driver in the parallel universe.

In 2012, Royo appeared in the NBC police drama Prime Suspect as Santana Cordero, an accused murderer killing witnesses before he was tried. He appears in the 2012 film Red Tails as Antwan "Coffee" Coleman. Royo then starred as a bully's alcoholic father in a Key & Peele sketch. In 2013, Royo portrayed geometry teacher Mr. Aster in the 2013 romantic-comedy drama film The Spectacular Now. Royo was a guest, playing Otis in the episode "Trading Faces" on Paul Scheer's action comedy series NTSF:SD:SUV:: on Cartoon Network's late-night block Adult Swim. He then was a guest voice in the Bob's Burgers episode "Nude Beach" playing himself, and then voiced an exterminator named Marcus in a 2014 episode titled "Tina and the Real Ghost". He appeared in the 2015 drama film Lila & Eve, as a character named Skaketti, alongside Jennifer Lopez and Viola Davis.

In 2015, Royo appeared in Agent Carter series portraying Spider Raymond, who ran the night club "La Martinique", but he became more notorious for being an illegal trader. He also appeared in Showtime's Happyish as Barry, mutual friend of the main characters, Thom and Lee Payne. In Amazon Prime's Hand of God, Royo portrayed San Vincente's Mayor Robert "Bobo" Boston. On Fox's Empire, he played Thirsty Rawlings, a shifty defense attorney.

In 2016, Royo won a Special Jury Award at the SXSW Film Festival for his role in Hunter Gatherer.

He appears alongside Octavia Spencer in the Apple TV+ series Truth Be Told, where he portrays an attorney.

In 2024, he appeared in Chris Stapleton's video "Think I'm in Love with You".

== Filmography ==
=== Film ===
Year	Title	Role	Notes
1998	L.A. Without a Map	Music Store Clerk	
2000	Shaft	Tattoo	
2001	Perfume	Posse Member	
2002	G	Tre	
2004	Planet Brooklyn	Junie	
2005	All the Invisible Children	Sammy	Segment: "Jesus Children of America"
2008	August	Dylan Gottschalk	
2009	21 and a Wake-Up	Dr. Jim West	
2010	Super	Hamilton	
2012	Red Tails	Antwan "Coffee" Coleman	
2012	Freelancers	Daniel Maldonado	
2012	Hellbenders	Stephen	
2012	The Collection	Wally	
2013	The Spectacular Now	Mr. Aster	
2014	Of Mind and Music	Kenny	
2014	Aftermath	Rob	
2015	Lila & Eve	Detective Skaketti	
2016	Hunter Gatherer	Ashley Douglas	
2017	Billy Boy	Mr. Adams	
2018	Beautiful Boy	Spencer	
2018	Prospect	Oruf	
2022	To Leslie	Royal	
2027	Man of Tomorrow †	TBA	Post-production

=== Television ===
Year	Title	Role	Notes
1999	Law & Order	Gil Freeman	Episode: "Hunters"
1999	Third Watch	Diop	Episode: "Anywhere But Here"
2000	Wonderland	Psychiatric patient	Episode: "Pilot"; uncredited
2002–07	Law & Order: Criminal Intent	Riley / Luther Pinkston	2 episodes
2002–08	The Wire	Reginald "Bubbles" Cousins	Main role
2003	Law & Order: Special Victims Unit	Felix Santos	Episode: "Loss"
2004	The Jury	Naadia Azhar	Episode: "Bangers"
2005	Cuts	George	3 episodes
2005	CSI: Miami	Julio Pena	Episode: "Vengeance"
2008	Terminator: The Sarah Connor Chronicles	Sumner	2 episodes
2008	Heroes	Stephen Canfield	2 episodes
2008	Criminal Minds	Armando Salinas	Episode: "Catching Out"
2009	Numbers	Tim Pynchon	Episode: "Arrow of Time"
2009	CSI: NY	Big Willie Brown	Episode: "Blacklist (Featuring Grave Digger)"
2010	Party Down	Scott	Episode: "Joel Munt's Big Deal Party"
2010	The Whole Truth	Eric Santiago	Episode: "Judicial Discretion"
2010–11	Fringe	Henry Arliss Higgins	3 episodes
2011	Memphis Beat	Ronnie	Episode: "Ten Little Memphians"
2011	How to Make It in America	Kevin	Episode: "In or Out"
2012	Prime Suspect	Santana Cordero	Episode: "Stuck in the Middle with You"
2012	Key & Peele	Bully's Dad	Episode: "Victory"
2013	Elementary	Thaddeus	Episode: "Déjà Vu All Over Again"
2013	NTSF:SD:SUV::	Otis	Episode: "Trading Faces"
2013	In Security	Lyle	6 episodes
2013–14	Bob's Burgers	Andre Royo / Marcus (voice)	2 episodes
2014–16	Kingdom	Hotel Owner	2 episodes
2014–17	Hand of God	Mayor Robert "Bobo" Boston	Main role
2015	Agent Carter	Spider Raymond	Episode: "Now is Not the End"
2015	Happyish	Barry	5 episodes
2015	Drunk History	King Oliver	Episode: "New Orleans"
2015–19	Empire	Thirsty Rawlings	Main role (seasons 4–5); recurring (seasons 2−3)
2016	Masters of Sex	Sammy Davis Jr.	Episode: "The Pleasure Protocol"
2017	Tim & Eric's Bedtime Stories	Isaiah	Episode: "Angel Man"
2020	Interrogation	Charlie Shannon	Recurring role; 5 episodes
2021	Truth Be Told	Demetrius	10 episodes
2021	With Love	Laz Zayas	Recurring role; 5 episodes
2026	The Punisher: One Last Kill	Dre	Disney+ television special
