= The Abducted =

- Fringe episode
- Episode no.: Season 3 Episode 7
- Directed by: Chuck Russell
- Written by: David Wilcox; Graham Roland
- Production code: 3X6107
- Original air date: November 18, 2010

Guest appearances
- Seth Gabel as Lincoln Lee; Kirk Acevedo as Charlie Francis; Will Rothhaar as Wyatt Toomy; John Hainsworth as Old Wyatt Toomy; Karen Holness as Diane Broyles; Curtis Harris as Christopher Broyles; David Nykl as Reverend Marcus; Michael Strusievici as Max Clayton; Andre Royo as Henry Higgins

Episode chronology
← Previous "6955 kHz"	Next → "Entrada"
- Fringe season 3

"The Abducted" is the seventh episode of the third season of the American science fiction drama television series Fringe. The third season spent much of its time alternating between the prime and parallel universes, and "The Abducted" was set in the latter. The episode followed the Fringe team's investigation of "the Candyman", a man who kidnaps children to harvest their youth-giving hormones.

The episode first aired on November 18, 2010 in the United States to an estimated 4.85 million viewers. Reviews of the episode were mixed; multiple critics lauded the final five minutes of the episode, while another praised lead actress Anna Torv and actor Lance Reddick's performances. Due to the holiday of Thanksgiving, "The Abducted" began a two-week break until the broadcast of a December 2 episode.

== Plot ==
"The Abducted" takes place in the parallel universe; Olivia (Anna Torv), having broken her conditioning that made her believe she was her doppelgänger Fauxlivia (Torv) from that universe, maintains the pretense that she is still conditioned. She meets with Henry (Andre Royo), the taxi driver who helped her out before, and asks him to help her return to Liberty Island to use the sensory deprivation tank to return herself to her universe.

A child, Max (Michael Strusievici), is kidnapped from his home. The Fringe team investigates and Broyles (Lance Reddick) immediately recognizes this as the work of "The Candyman"; though only appearing once every two years, the Candyman abducts a child and returns him some days later, but whatever the Candyman has done leaves the child physically deprived. Broyles' own son, Christopher (Curtis Harris), was one of the most recent victims, having become blind as a result of the ordeal. Christopher tells Olivia that he believes there were two people involved with his abduction, one old and one young. Combined with other information, Olivia suspects that the Candyman is draining the children of hormones from the pituitary gland, helping the Candyman stay young.

The interview leads Olivia and Broyles to Reverend Marcus (David Nykl), who gave up a career as a physician in order to establish a local church. Working through the congregation list, Olivia talks to one member, Wyatt Toomy (Will Rothhaar), a garbageman. When Olivia spots a child's toy within his apartment, Wyatt realizes he is caught and attempts to escape, but Olivia captures him. She soon finds Max in a hidden room with a not-yet-activated device on the back of his head near the pituitary gland. She frees the boy, accidentally telling him she is an FBI agent.

Believing the case completed, Olivia goes to meet with Henry, where he has gotten use of his cousin's boat. As he talks about having been trained to use it, Olivia contemplates how Wyatt knew about the chemistry to make the serum, and realizes he had a teacher as well – their true culprit, and immediately suspects Reverend Marcus. Broyles and Olivia hurry to his house to protect Christopher from Marcus; Broyles kills Marcus. Olivia accompanies Broyles and his family to the same hospital that Max is being treated. There, Max thanks Olivia personally and asks her about what the "FBI" is. Broyles, having listened to Olivia's conversation, knows that she has broken her conditioning, as the FBI had ceased to exist over a decade ago in the parallel universe. Because of her efforts to save Christopher, he lets her go.

Olivia rejoins Henry and then leaves him to swim the rest of the way in and make her way to the isolation tank. After injecting herself with the same drugs Walternate (John Noble) had used on her, she enters the tank and soon finds herself back in her own universe. She encounters a cleaning lady, and as Olivia feels herself being dragged back to the parallel universe, she gives the cleaning lady a message to pass along to Peter (Joshua Jackson). Back in the isolation tank, Walternate has had Olivia extracted from the tank and directs his agents to lock her up and sedate her.

Back in the prime universe, Peter and Fauxlivia are in bed together when Peter receives a call from the cleaning lady, who relays the message: that Olivia is trapped in the parallel universe. Peter realizes that he has been sleeping with Olivia's doppelgänger.

== Production ==
"The attitude among the characters in the alternate universe is that the people ‘over here’ are bad... They did this to us. They started this thing. They’re trying to destroy our world. As far as I’m concerned, Olivia is one of those people. She’s one of the bad people that wants to kill us and if there’s any chance she can regain her senses, she’s a threat, especially if she’s as formdiable [sic] as our Olivia. But something happens in this episode where things begin to change."

— Actor Lance Reddick

"The Abducted" was written by co-executive producer David Wilcox and executive story editor Graham Roland, and directed by filmmaker Chuck Russell. The episode featured guest appearances by Curtis Harris, David Nykl, John Hainsworth, Karen Holness, Andre Royo, Will Rothhaar, Tristin Leffler, and Michael Strusievici. Holness and Royo had previously guest starred on Fringe before as the characters Diane Broyles and Henry Higgins, respectively.

Alluding to the normally "no-nonsense" personality of his character Phillip Broyles, actor Lance Reddick noted that for once "you get to see [Broyles] smile and have fun. Not for very long, but you see it. You get to meet his ex-wife (Karen Holness) and find out why his marriage ended. You understand more about his relationship to his work and his job and the Fringe Division–how he feels about it and why he does what he does."

Reddick drew inspiration for the episode from undercover FBI agent Joe Pistone, whom he met while filming the TV series Falcone. Pistone recommended his autobiography Donnie Brasco: My Undercover Life in the Mafia, and Reddick found many parallels to it and the episode. "In the book, [Pistone] talked about how while being undercover in the Mafia, he had to separate his personal feelings from his professional and moral sense of responsibility. There were certain guys he really couldn’t stand, but there were some people he genuinely liked, even though ultimately he had to bring them down. I think Col. Broyles feels the same way about Olivia. On various occasions, she has performed heroically to earn his respect, and in tonight’s episode, that appreciation — and the angst that goes with it — reaches a new level".

As with other Fringe episodes, Fox released a science lesson plan in collaboration with Science Olympiad for grade school children, focusing on the science seen in "The Abducted", with the intention of having "students learn about vaccination and the spread of communicable diseases."

== Cultural references ==
Peter and Fauxlivia watch the 1942 romantic drama film Casablanca, and the latter incorrectly says it starred actor and later president of the United States Ronald Reagan, rather than actor Humphrey Bogart. Olivia finds a children's book her niece owns called Burlap Bear Goes To The Woods in Christopher's room. SFScope's Sarah Stegall believed that the episode antagonist's name of Toomy was a reference to popular villain Eugene Victor Tooms in the science fiction television series The X-Files. Olivia also refers to several fringe cases that were in first season episodes of Fringe, including "The Same Old Story" and "Midnight".

== Reception ==
=== Ratings ===
On its initial broadcast on November 17, 2010, "The Abducted" was watched by an estimated 4.85 million viewers in the United States, with a 3.0/5 rating among all households. It earned a 1.9/5 ratings share for viewers 18-49, helping Fox place third for the night in that demographic. Due to the Thanksgiving holiday in the US, "The Abducted" was the last episode to air until December 2, when the season's eighth episode "Entrada" aired. Time shifted viewing increased the episode's ratings by 37 percent among adults, resulting in a rise from 1.9 to 2.6.

=== Reviews ===
"This was one of the best, creepiest, most tightly written episodes of this outstanding third season... It takes a heck of a writing team to give us a story that is both touching and spine-tingling."

— SFScope writer Sarah Stegall

Entertainment Weekly writer Ken Tucker wrote, "I loved this episode for... its careful layering and expansion of the series’ key themes, and for the way it’s setting us up for a truly superb, universe-shaking episode when Fringe returns Dec. 2." The A.V. Club's Noel Murray graded the episode with a B+, explaining he enjoyed the episode more than the previous visit to the parallel universe because "the last five minutes or so of 'The Abducted' were more compelling than the case-of-the-week. But not far more. The Candy Man is just so creepy—and his crime so powerfully symbolic—that I felt better about this episode overall than I did about 'Amber."

Los Angeles Times columnist Andrew Hanson thought the whole episode was "disturbing, even for Fringe", and was pleased that the killers were shot rather than arrested due to the heinousness of their crimes. SFScope contributor Sarah Stegall believed the episode contained some of the cast's best performances, especially praising Lance Reddick's portrayal of a "very human, caring hero who has been damaged but not crippled by the tragedy that struck his family" and Anna Torv's ability to subtly play both Olivias. IGN's Phil Pirrello believed "the Broyles Factor padded a cool premise with a solid (if unremarkable) execution that lead to a great final five minutes." In January 2013, IGN ranked it the eighth best episode of the entire series, explaining that "this one holds a special place for having so many elements of what makes Fringe great... There's only one word for the way this episode handled two awesome storylines and intertwined them seamlessly: brilliant."
