= Ryan McDonald (Canadian actor) =

Canadian actor (born 1984)

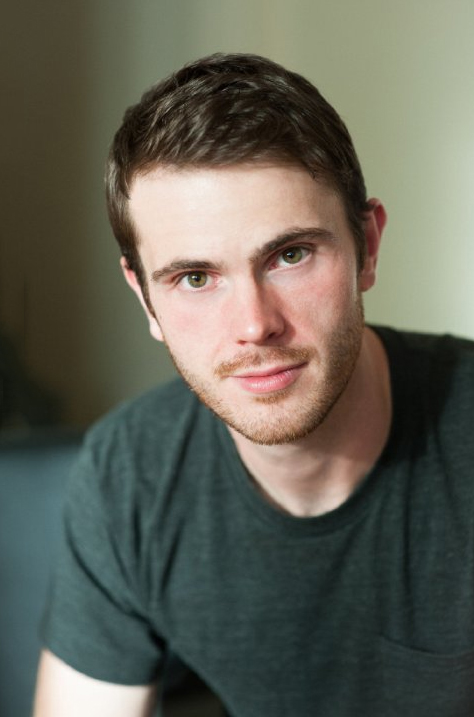
- Born: Ryan James McDonald; August 5, 1984 (age 42); New Westminster, British Columbia, Canada
- Occupation: Actor
- Years active: 2000–present

Ryan James McDonald (born August 5, 1984) is a Canadian actor. He is sometimes mistakenly credited as Ryan MacDonald. He is most noted for his performance in the film Black Conflux, for which he was a Canadian Screen Award nominee for Best Actor at the 8th Canadian Screen Awards.

== Filmography ==
=== Film ===
| Year | Title | Role | Notes | | | | | |
|---|---|---|---|---|---|---|---|---|
| 2002 | Bang Bang You're Dead | Vanderhoff | | | | | | |
| 2002 | Halloween: Resurrection | Letter Sweater Guy | | | | | | |
| 2002 | Zero Tolerance | Rod | Short film | | | | | |
| 2005 | The Ballad of Jack and Rose | Rodney | | | | | | |
| 2005 | Fierce People | Ian | | | | | | |
| 2005 | The Exorcism of Emily Rose | Student in Classroom | | | | | | |
| 2007 | Resurrecting the Champ | Kenny | | | | | | |
| 2007 | American Venus | Ty | | | | | | |
| 2007 | Battle in Seattle | Passer-by | | | | | | |
| 2008 | The Art of War II: Betrayal | Alex | Video | | | | | |
| 2008 | Run Rabbit Run | Dave | | | | | | |
| 2009 | Kick Me Down | Helper Bill | | | | | | |
| 2009 | The Private Lives of Pippa Lee | Ben Lee | | | | | | |
| 2009 | The Mechanic | Ryan | Short film | | | | | |
| 2009 | 2012 | Scotty | | | | | | |
| 2010 | Honey, I'm Home | Radio D.J. One | Short film | 2011 Good Morning Killer Jason Ripley | 2012 | Crimes of Mike Recket | Detective Lyle Eszchuk | Credited but did not appear. (Note: Having been filmed in a few scenes as one of the two investigating officers, McDonald received word that he had landed a part in Los Angeles. With his scenes reshot and his character replaced altogether (with the one played by Raphael Kepinski), McDonald does, nonetheless, receive an onscreen credit.) |
| 2018 | He's Out There | John | | | | | | |
| 2019 | Black Conflux | Dennis Smarten | | | | | | |
| 2020 | Becky | Cole | | | | | | |
| 2021 | On the Count of Three | Brian | | | | | | |
| 2023 | The King Tide | Dillon | | | | | | |
| 2025 | Thanks to the Hard Work of the Elephants | Security guard | | | | | | |

=== Television ===
| Year | Title | Role | Notes |
|---|---|---|---|
| 2000 | Christy: The Movie | Lundy Taylor | TV movie |
| 2002 | Glory Days | Sam's Schoolmate | "Grim Ferrytale" |
| 2005 | Terry | Doug Alward | TV movie |
| 2005 | Masters of Horror | Boxx | "Dance of the Dead" |
| 2009–2012 | Fringe | Brandon Fayette | Recurring role 20 episodes |
| 2010 | Freshman Father | Jake | TV movie |
| 2010 | Psych | Jack Smith | "Dual Spires" |
| 2011 | Good Morning, Killer | Jason | TV movie |
| 2017 | What Would Sal Do? | Vince | Nominated – Canadian Screen Award for Best Performance by an Actor in a Featured Supporting Role or Guest Role in a Comedic Series (2017); 8 episodes |
| 2017 | Supernatural | Pete Garfinkle | "The Memory Remains" |
| 2018 | Bad Blood | Reggie Ross | 8 episodes |
| 2018–2019 | The Magicians | Bacchus | 3 episodes |
