= Brave New World (Fringe) =

- Fringe episodes
- Episode nos.: Season 4 Episodes 21 and 22
- Directed by: Joe Chappelle
- Written by: J. H. Wyman; Jeff Pinkner; Akiva Goldsman
- Production codes: 3X7021; 3X7022
- Original air dates: May 4, 2012 (Part 1); May 11, 2012 (Part 2)

Guest appearances
- Jared Harris as David Robert Jones; Rebecca Mader as Jessica Holt; Samantha Noble as Doctor Benlo; Leonard Nimoy as Dr. William Bell; Michael Cerveris as September; Gerard Plunkett as Senator James Van Horn

Episode chronology
← Previous "Worlds Apart"	Next → "Transilience Thought Unifier Model-11"
- Fringe season 4

"Brave New World" is the two-part finale of the fourth season of the Fox science-fiction drama television series Fringe, and the series' 86th and 87th episodes overall. The episode, at the time of its writing and production, was created to be a possible series finale if the show was not renewed for a final season. As such, the episode not only resolves many of the plot lines introduced for the fourth season, but also several long-running plots throughout the show's run. In the episode, the Fringe division learns that Walter Bishop's old colleague, William Bell, has been in control of David Robert Jones' actions to collapse both universes in an attempt to create a new universe under his own control, and the Fringe team must make sacrifices to put an end to Bell's plans.

Both parts were co-written by Jeff Pinkner, J. H. Wyman, and Akiva Goldsman. Joe Chappelle served as director. Leonard Nimoy, though having previously stated his retirement from acting, reprised his role of Dr. William Bell. Rebecca Mader also guest starred as Jessica Holt, a person-of-interest to Fringe division.

== Plot ==
=== Part one ===
Several people in an office complex suddenly exhibit signs of spontaneous combustion and die; others witnessing it realize that the symptom is onset by movement and stand perfectly still as help arrives. As Fringe division investigates, they find a device planted in the building's escalator system that released nanites into those that rode it, triggering the combustion by body movement. One survivor, Jessica (Rebecca Mader), offers to be a test subject for Walter (John Noble) as he tries to discover a cure. When Jessica's body temperature starts to rapidly rise before the cure is synthesized, Olivia (Anna Torv) uses her Cortexiphan abilities to slow Jessica's system, which stops the nanites and allows Peter (Joshua Jackson) to inject the cure into her system.

The Fringe team finds that David Robert Jones (Jared Harris) had planted the device, and worry that despite the deactivation of the bridge, he is still trying to collapse both universes to create a third one. Walter studies the design of the device and recognizes that the nanites were not developed by Jones but by William Bell (Leonard Nimoy), and begins to suspect Bell is alive. Nina Sharp (Blair Brown) rejects this theory, explaining that, in the new timeline, Bell had committed suicide in a car accident in 2005 to end his suffering from lymphoma. Disbelieving Nina, Walter returns to St. Claire's Mental Institution and finds the scent of Bell in one of the log books that dated back to when Walter believed he had visited, and continues to assert this claim.

Unknown to Fringe division, Jones reports to William Bell aboard the container ship (seen in "Nothing As It Seems") that Olivia and team have created a cure for the nanites. Bell references a chess game that he has been playing for 40 years that a winning move doesn't mean winning the game. He explains that the art of chess is to be willing to sacrifice one's most valuable piece to open up opportunity. He remarks that he needs to sacrifice the bishop to win the game.

Later, a column of light suddenly appears over Beacon Hill, burning a hole through a building and into the ground. Walter identifies it as sunlight, reflected to satellites likely under Jones' control, aimed to ignite an oil reservoir deep below Boston. He directs Peter and Olivia to the most likely location Jones is controlling the satellites from. They find two antennas that must be disabled simultaneously, requiring them to split up to do so. Though they are successful in stopping the beam, Peter is attacked by Jones. Olivia utilizes her Cortexiphan abilities again, and is able to telekinetically control Peter's body, allowing him to get the upper hand, throwing Jones into one of the antennas. The electrical shock causes Jones' body, previously altered by his teleportation, to disintegrate, and he realizes too late that he was the bishop to be sacrificed before crumbling into ash.

Walter discovers evidence of Chilean almonds on one of the log sheets from St. Claire's, Bell's favorite snack. He and Astrid (Jasika Nicole) travel to the warehouse of the shipping company that imported the almonds, finding it abandoned with one man, armed with a gun, stating the company went out of business three years ago. Astrid implores Walter to leave, but he is enticed by a strange sound from the back of the warehouse, finding several shipping containers being moved about with the noises coming from them. They are discovered by henchmen and attempt to flee. Astrid is shot, and as Walter tends to her, William Bell appears, reintroducing himself to his old friend.

=== Part two ===
Olivia (Torv) and Peter (Jackson) return to Walter's (Noble) laboratory, finding both him and Astrid (Nicole) missing. As they try to discover their whereabouts, Olivia receives a call from Jessica (Mader), believing that someone is following her. They are unaware that September (Michael Cerveris) has arrived at Jessica's house, but finds himself stuck to a "stasis rune" written into the floor preventing him from moving; by the time Olivia and Peter arrive, Jessica and a section of the floor with the rune have gone missing.

Broyles (Lance Reddick) reports that Astrid has been taken to a local hospital and is faring well. She is worried for Walter's safety, warning them of Bell's (Nimoy) presence, and directing them to the warehouse. There, they find September still stuck on the piece of floor, and Jessica holding him at gunpoint. She reveals she is working for Bell, purposely endangered herself by the nanites to attract Fringe and the Observers' attention. She attempts to kill September with a gun, but September is able to catch the bullets in his hand. Jessica was aware of the Observers' reflexes, and then uses a specially designed gun that fires quicker than September can react, and the bullet strikes him in the chest. When she tries to fire again, Olivia is able to psychokinetically catch and repel the bullets back into Jessica, killing her.

Peter releases September from the rune. Olivia recognizes September's wound from the time he appeared to her at the opera house and told her that in every future he witnessed, Olivia would die (as seen in "Back to Where You've Never Been"). September reveals that, to him, this conversation has not yet happened, and departs to investigate why he would say that to Olivia.

Peter races Jessica's body back to Walter's lab, and with Nina's (Brown) help and resources from Massive Dynamic, connects her brain to equipment to briefly give her consciousness to determine Bell's location. Her answers are vague and cryptic but reveal that Bell is on a boat, and seeking a power source to collapse the two universes. Olivia goes to grip Jessica, shorting out power in the laboratory. Nina realizes that Olivia is Bell's power source; Jones' activities have been to invigorate Olivia's Cortexiphan powers to start the collapse of the two universes. Nina is able to use Olivia's electromagnetic readings to locate Bell's ship. The Fringe team sets off for Bell's boat on helicopters as initial signs of the final collapse begin to occur around the world.

Meanwhile, aboard his boat, Bell has shown Walter his vision for the new universe, using the creatures stowed aboard it to populate his ideal world. Bell reveals that he had been set on to this path by Walter after Walter had lost both Peters and desired to play God himself. Walter rejected the idea then, asking Bell to remove pieces of his brain to quell the idea, but Bell continued to follow Walter's vision, culminating in the current events.

The Fringe team approaches where Bell's freighter appears to be, but find that it has already become in sync with the other universe and only observable by Peter. Olivia is able to use her Cortexiphan abilities to cross over with Peter onto the freighter in mid-jump from the helicopter. They raid the cabin where Bell and Walter are. Peter attempts to stop Bell, but Bell asserts that the process is irreversible due to Olivia's powers. Walter then turns to Olivia and shoots her in the head with a handgun, completely disrupting the collapse. His plan ruined, Bell rings a bell and fades away as Walter hesitates to shoot him. Walter races to extract the bullet from Olivia, recognizing that the Cortexiphan should be able to regenerate the tissue and allow her to live.

Bell's freighter and biological experiments are stored away, and the US Government grants Broyles' request for a funding increase, as well as a promotion to general. Olivia makes a full recovery, though Walter suspects that her Cortexiphan powers will be stunted by the process. As she and Peter hug, she also reveals that she is pregnant with their child. Sometime later, as Walter prepares a snack in his lab, September appears before him, telling him, "We have to warn the others. They are coming," referring to hostile Observers from the future (as seen in "Letters of Transit").

== Production ==
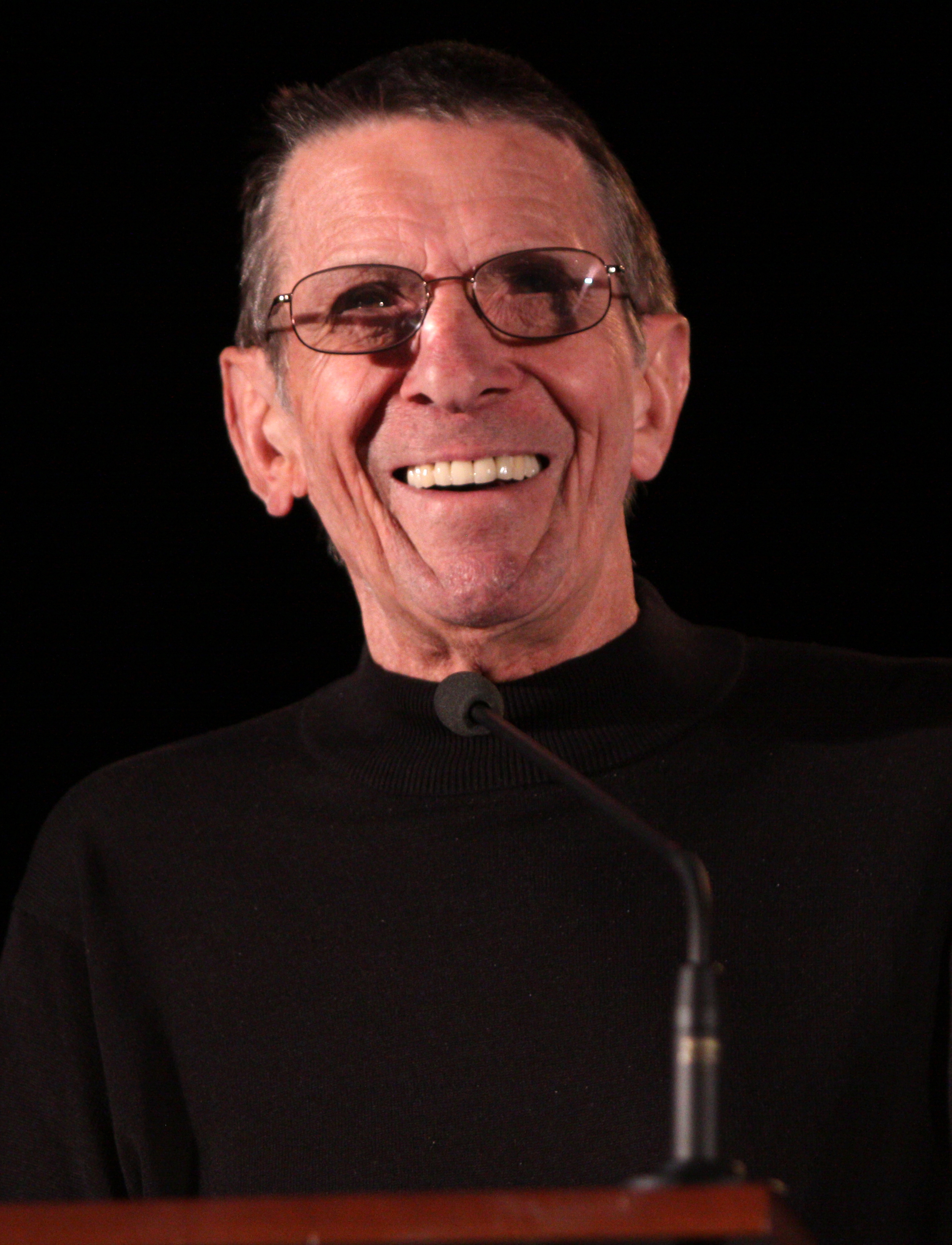
Actor Leonard Nimoy returned as Dr. William Bell in "Brave New World".

"Brave New World" was co-written by co-showrunners J.H. Wyman and Jeff Pinkner and consulting producer Akiva Goldsman. Executive producer Joe Chappelle served as director.

"Traditionally we end the seasons with chapters, and this was a gentle closing of the chapter."

— Executive producer J.H. Wyman on "Brave New World".

"Brave New World" was written and produced prior to announcement of Fringe's fifth season renewal. The executive producers Wyman and Pinkner had written the episode as "if it would potentially be the last [episode] ever," taking the opportunity to conclude some of the open plots such as the bridge to the parallel universe and killing off villain David Robert Jones. This would allow them, in the case the show was renewed, to be able to focus on the conclusion of their main narrative. If the show had not been renewed, they would have anticipated using other media, such as comic books and the Internet, to conclude their story. The finale was written to be more emotional and less about the show's mythology than to provide a happy ending for the viewers. Though rumors from cast members implied that two separate endings were shot depending on the fate of the show's renewal, the producers denied this, having edited the episode's ending to serve either to whet the viewer's appetite for the final season or to launch into other media to conclude their story.

Actor Leonard Nimoy returned for a special guest appearance in both episodes, as Dr. William Bell. Since Bell's last Fringe appearance on-screen in "Over There (Part 2)", Nimoy had announced that he was retiring from acting. He later reprised voice-over work, including voicing Bell for the Fringe episode "Lysergic Acid Diethylamide". Nimoy's return to Fringe was preceded by statements made by Nimoy that suggested he may return to acting for a brief role in Star Trek Into Darkness; further hinting at Nimoy's return as Bell was a brief shot in the Fringe episode, "Letters of Transit". Nimoy stated that he was interested in returning to play the role of Bell after learning that they had changed the character's motives to be more villainous, noting that for himself, "I could play aspects of a character that I haven't played in a long time." Furthermore, Nimoy reaffirmed his love for the show and the people behind it, calling it "a superior company. I have never worked with a better company in my entire 60-year career."

When asked if the writers were writing themselves into a "corner" due to Bell's apparent prevalence in future episodes, Wyman answered, "Once you kind of realize the extent of everything, it will probably become clear why we’re not [writing ourselves into a corner]." Concerning Nimoy's involvement with season five, Pinkner stated, "We basically erected a sign outside of Leonard's house that says, ‘Please come back to Fringe,’ and we are hoping that by Season 5 he says yes." Nimoy had not ruled out returning for the 5th season, stating that "There are certain special situations that come along that can intrigue me."

John Noble's daughter, Samantha Noble, guest starred as the administrator of St. Claire's, Dr. Benlo. Jessica Holt was played by Rebecca Mader, who is an alumna of co-creator J. J. Abrams' ABC series, Lost.

Olivia's temporary death was previously mentioned not only in "Back to Where You've Never Been", but in the third-season episode "Lysergic Acid Diethylamide". In that episode, Olivia, having her mind taken over by Bell, had observed a man wearing an X-marked shirt, dubbed "Mr. X", that she had identified would be the person that would kill her at some point in the future. Wyman explained that the shape of the X in the nanites revealed in the first part of the episode alluded to this scene, naming Bell as the person that will kill Olivia.

== Cultural references ==
The pre-credits scene between William Bell and Walter Bishop, during which Bell showed Walter his vision of the new third universe, was noted to call back to a similar conversation had between the characters of Carol Marcus and Captain Kirk regarding the artificially made Genesis planet in Star Trek II: The Wrath of Khan. Bell uses a stanza from the William Butler Yeats poem "Lake Isle of Innisfree" to describe his vision of his new world to Walter Bishop.

== Reception ==
=== Ratings ===
The first part of "Brave New World" was watched by an estimate 2.9 million viewers on its first broadcast, earning it a 0.9 in the adult demographic, slightly lower than the previous week's episode. The second part was slightly higher, with a 1.0 rating and estimated 3.2 million viewers.
