= Novation (Fringe) =

- Fringe episode
- Episode no.: Season 4 Episode 5
- Directed by: Paul Holahan
- Written by: J. R. Orci; Graham Roland
- Production code: 3X7005
- Original air date: November 4, 2011

Guest appearances
- Arye Gross as Malcolm Truss; Michelle Krusiec as Nadine Park

Episode chronology
← Previous "Subject 9"	Next → "And Those We've Left Behind"
- Fringe season 4

"Novation" is the fifth episode of the fourth season of the Fox science fiction drama television series Fringe, and the series' 70th episode overall. In the episode, the Fringe team of the alternate timeline deal with the ramifications of Peter Bishop's return.

The episode was co-written by J.R. Orci and Graham Roland, while Paul Holahan served as the director. It first aired on November 4, 2011 in the United States to an estimated 3.28 million viewers.

== Plot ==
Olivia (Anna Torv) and the others of Fringe Division attempt to determine the origin of Peter Bishop (Joshua Jackson), who purports to be Walter's (John Noble) son who had died as a young boy in the original timeline. Peter refuses to speak to anyone but Walter, yet Walter is very reluctant to accept Peter's story. Peter is held at Fringe headquarters in secure facilities.

Fringe Division is brought to investigate the violent murders of a woman and her live-in boyfriend in her home. They find that she was earlier married to Dr. Malcolm Truss (Arye Gross), a former Massive Dynamic biochemical researcher, and believe her murder was an attempt to access his aborted research on cell cloning by one of the new shapeshifters, Nadine (Michelle Krusiec) (previously seen in "Neither Here Nor There"). While at Massive Dynamic, it is revealed that Nina Sharp (Blair Brown) raised Olivia and her sister Rachel after Olivia killed her stepfather and ran away from Walter's Cortexiphan trials; Walter resents Nina for both this and for her interference that led to young Peter's death. The Fringe team is unable to locate Truss before Nadine does, and begins a manhunt to track him down. Meanwhile, Nadine has tried to convince Truss that she is a patient in need of his cloning research, and coerces him to take her to a secret laboratory to synthesize the cure. It's revealed she has a daughter, Haley.

As Fringe Division attempts to work out Truss's location, Peter, from inside his cell, uses the intercom electronics to try to convince Olivia and the others that he knows about shapeshifter technology. Under guard, Peter is able to use one of the memory discs previously recovered by the Fringe team to identify a tracking signal, leading the team to Truss's laboratory. Truss has come to discover Nadine's truth after she temporarily loses control and takes the form of his deceased wife, but under threat of death, continues to synthesize the cure.

Truss finishes the cure just as the FBI and Fringe agents surround the warehouse containing the lab. After being given the cure, Nadine attempts to fight off the agents, but appears to have dived into the water below. After recovering a body from the water, they realize that Nadine had taken the place of a fallen agent and had escaped their grasp. Nadine uses a Hermes 3000 typewriter stored in a locker at a Boston train station to type a report informing them of the success of Truss's cure; moments later, the typewriter, on its own, types out further instructions for her.

Walter, after trying to resolve his issues with Peter, returns to Fringe headquarters to inform Peter that because he had two chances to save his son and let him down both times, he will not try to help again for fear of doing more harm. Meanwhile, Olivia experiences an unexplained time fluctuation.

== Production ==
"Well, for Peter, he wants to go to his timeline. It's not a question of will these characters suddenly flip and will this world suddenly become the world he left? He's literally trying to find a way to travel back to the place he left. He's in Oz trying to get back to Kansas. Everybody just looks exactly like they did when he left Kansas. It's just they're living a much different circumstance because he was never a part of it."

— Co-showrunner Jeff Pinkner on Peter's return

The episode was co-written by consulting producer J.R. Orci and co-producer Graham Roland, while Paul Holahan marked his second directing credit for the series (his first being the second season episode "Snakehead").

"Novation" is the first episode of the season to feature Peter Bishop's (played by main cast member Joshua Jackson) return. The actor joked that his character's prior absence "gave me an extra month and half off. But I thought it was necessary. You need to give space to explore the effect Peter's choice had. Otherwise, you make last season's cliffhanger finale – which I thought was a big, ballsy thing to do – not all that important."

== Reception ==
=== Ratings ===
The Fringe episode was initially meant to air on October 28, 2011, but was delayed until November 4 due to Game 7 of the 2011 World Series. The Fox network produced a video using Fringe episode clips to mock the delay. "Novation" had 3.28 million viewers, up a tenth with adults 18-49 to a 1.3 rating from the previous episode. Among the night's three science fiction genre shows, Fringe placed second in the 18-49 demographic behind NBC's Grimm but ahead of The CW's Supernatural.

=== Reviews ===
Entertainment Weekly writer Jeff Jensen praised Noble and Jackson's performances: "The reunion of the Bishop boys was a great, well-acted scene. Walter, unable to even look at Peter; Peter, his face full of warmth and grace for his damaged father. Poignant. I am amazed by how this cast is always able to find the emotion in the material they're given, no matter how gonzo-heady [sic]." Jensen continued, "I also like how Peter represents us, the fan, in the show itself. He embodies our conflicted feelings about the new timeline; he keeps the memory of the old continuity alive." The A.V. Club's Noel Murray graded the episode with a B+; he wrote, "'Novation' isn't exactly a powerhouse; it's more explanatory and less sensational, designed to explore the immediate ramifications of Peter's inconvenient reappearance, and to set up some of what's to come. [The episode] is more sinew and bone than muscle. But it's well-structured sinew and bone, I'd say." IGN contributor Ramsey Isler rated "Novation" 8.0/10, explaining "With Joshua Jackson back in the forefront of Fringe, it feels like the show is finally whole again... suddenly the show once again has solid direction." He continued, "'Novation' is a solid episode. It may not be the game-changing, mind-exploding episode many fans were hoping for but it's entertaining nonetheless, and it moves things forward nicely."

Jensen criticized the relationship between Nadine and Malcolm as not "all that compelling." Murray wrote that "The scenes between Malcolm and Nadine are much quieter and more complex than the typical Fringe freak interactions. (They're also a little wooden, unfortunately, due to the performance of the actress playing Nadine.)" Isler was also critical of guest actress Michelle Krusiec's delivery, stating the performance was "really bland in many spots and she never really achieve a convincing femme fatale vibe." Isler had other critiques of the episode, writing "Some of the writing/direction is a little bit off too, and I saw the shapeshifter switcharoo coming a mile away. These aren't major flaws, but they do detract a tiny bit from the story."
