= J. R. Orci =

Mexican television writer and producer (born 1975)

- Born: Jorge Richard Orci; August 9, 1975 (age 50); Mexico City, Mexico
- Other name: Rick Orci
- Occupations: Writer, producer
- Years active: 2003–present
- Relatives: Roberto Orci (brother)

Jorge Richard Orci (born August 9, 1975) is a Mexican television writer and producer.

== Life and career ==
Orci was born in Mexico City to a Mexican father and a Cuban mother. His mother fled Cuba after Fidel Castro came to power. He was raised in Mexico City, Canada, Texas, and Los Angeles. He graduated from the University of Texas at Austin. Orci is the younger brother of screenwriter Roberto Orci, with whom he worked on the ABC TV series Alias as well as on the FOX science-fiction drama Fringe. He worked on the NBC drama The Blacklist.

=== Fringe ===
Orci joined the FOX science-fiction/horror series Fringe, in its first season as writer and supervising producer. He was brought on to the show by his brother Roberto Orci, who is the co-creator (along with J. J. Abrams and Alex Kurtzman). Orci also served as consulting producer and writer during the show's fourth season. Episodes he has contributed to include:

- "The Ghost Network" 01.03 (co-written by co-executive producer David H. Goodman)
- "The Equation" 01.08 (co-written by Goodman)
- "The Transformation" 01.13 (co-written by Zack Whedon)
- "Unleashed" 01.16 (co-written by Whedon)
- "The Road Not Taken" 01.19 (Orci and executive producer Jeff Pinkner co-wrote a teleplay based on a story by consulting producer Akiva Goldsman)
- "Novation" 04.05 (co-written with co-producer Graham Roland)
- "Welcome to Westfield" 04.12 (co-written by Roland)
- "Everything in Its Right Place" 04.17 (Orci and co-executive producer David Fury co-wrote a teleplay based on a story by Orci and story editor Matthew Pitts)

== Filmography ==
Year	TV Program	Credit	Notes
2001–2006	Alias	writer, co-producer	
2006	Vanished	writer, producer	
2007	Journeyman	writer, supervising producer	
2008–2012	Fringe	writer, supervising producer, consulting producer	
2010–2011	Hawaii Five-0	writer, co-executive producer	
2013–2023	The Blacklist	writer, consulting producer, co-executive producer, executive producer	
