= Matthew Pitts =

American television writer

- Other name: Matt Pitts
- Education: Saint Anselm College
- Occupation: Writer
- Years active: 2008–present

Matthew Pitts is an American television writer, best known for his involvement with J.J. Abrams.

== Career ==
Pitts began his career working as J. J. Abrams' assistant on the film Cloverfield and held the same position on Abrams' Star Trek, before transitioning into a writer.

Pitts has written a horror screenplay entitled Spring Break Zombie Cruise, about a government-created virus that infects a group of people on a Spring Break cruise. The script was shopped to studios, intended to be shot in 3-D. He wrote the script for the upcoming thriller Quicksand, starring Carolina Gaitán and Allan Hawco.

He served as a writer, executive story editor, and co-producer on the NBC adventure series Revolution. Other series he would work on include Impulse and Westworld.

=== Fringe ===
Pitts worked on the FOX science-fiction/mystery series Fringe in some capacity since the first season, beginning with being co-creator Abrams' assistant. He has since been given the opportunity to write for the show's second, third, and fourth seasons. He would go onto serve as story editor. Installments he has contributed to include:

- "Olivia. In the Lab. With the Revolver." (2.17)
- "Do Shapeshifters Dream of Electric Sheep?" (3.04) (co-written with co-executive producer David Wilcox)
- "Concentrate and Ask Again" (3.12) (co-written with executive story editor Graham Roland)
- "Wallflower" (4.07) (co-written by script coordinator Justin Doble)
- "Everything in Its Right Place" (04.17) (co-executive producer David Fury and consulting producer J.R. Orci co-wrote a teleplay based on a story by Pitts and Orci)
- "Worlds Apart" (4.20) (Pitts and DC Comics' Nicole Phillips co-wrote a teleplay based on a story by co-producer Roland)

He also wrote the Tales from the Fringe comic series.
