= Wallflower (Fringe) =

- Fringe episode
- Episode no.: Season 4 Episode 7
- Directed by: Anthony Hemingway
- Written by: Matt Pitts; Justin Doble
- Production code: 3X7007
- Original air date: November 18, 2011

Guest appearances
- Tobias Segal as Eugene Bryant; Monte Markham as Dr. Blake West; Nancy Sivak as Nurse Jaffe

Episode chronology
← Previous "And Those We've Left Behind"	Next → "Back to Where You've Never Been"
- Fringe season 4

"Wallflower" is the seventh episode of the fourth season of the Fox science-fiction drama television series Fringe, and the series' 72nd episode overall. "Wallflower" served as the show's mid-season finale, as it was the last to air in 2011; the next installment was broadcast on January 13, 2012.

The episode was co-written by Matt Pitts and Justin Doble, while being directed by Anthony Hemingway.

== Plot ==
Olivia Dunham (Anna Torv), suffering from a late-night migraine, runs across her fellow agent Lincoln Lee (Seth Gabel) at an all-night diner. Meanwhile, Peter Bishop (Joshua Jackson), having been allowed to live on his own under guard, attempts to figure out how to use the Machine to return him to his original timeline.

The Fringe team is alerted to the death of a man whose skin and hair have turned white. Walter (John Noble) determines that the pigment from the man's skin has been extracted, and identifies traces of animal DNA along with human ones. The human DNA leads back to a child who reportedly died within a week after his birth in 1989, suffering from a rare skin condition that made him suffer from exposure to any form of light. However, Fringe division learns that the baby, possibly still alive, was moved to a pharmaceutical company that was a subsidiary of Massive Dynamic. Olivia and Lincoln confront Nina Sharp (Blair Brown), who affirms that the child had not died, but instead tested on; his condition allowed the researchers to implant animal genes in his skin, allowing him to survive in light while giving him the ability to perfectly camouflage with his surroundings and an instinct for survival. Kept in the lab for years, the child, named U. Gene (short for "unknown genetic disorder") eventually escaped during a fire at the facility, and has remained undetected for years.

As other incidents and deaths occur at a condominium high-rise, Walter deduces that U. Gene (Tobias Segal) is trying to extract the pigment from his victims to make himself visible, a treatment that will likely kill him if he continues the practice. After Walter identifies that U. Gene can be seen using ultraviolet light, Fringe and FBI agents seal off the building and conduct a manhunt. Olivia discovers U. Gene first, but he takes her gun and holds her at gunpoint while he explains his desire to become visible to others once again. He refuses to heed Olivia's warning about the fatality of the treatment, and runs off, escaping in the general chaos of the search. The teams close down the hunt and discover his makeshift lab in the building's basement. From the numerous valuables in the lab, the Fringe team determines that U. Gene had been silently watching the residents, getting to know them affectionately over time. The next day, U. Gene, having completed another treatment and now visible to others, is elated when one of the residents, Julie, with whom he is infatuated, introduces herself to him. After she leaves the elevator, he succumbs to the treatment and dies. As Olivia reports U. Gene's death to Nina, she wonders if she herself, as a Cortexiphan nootropic drug trial subject, is unable to feel for others. Nina attempts unsuccessfully to allay her fears.

In the episode's conclusion, Peter buys a pair of glasses for Lincoln that Olivia will appreciate more than his current pair. Olivia offers to meet Lincoln at the late-night diner. As she is getting ready to leave for the meeting, she is gassed, and agents working for Nina Sharp give her an injection, noting that once she wakes up, she won't remember the last two hours, but she will have "one hell of a headache".

== Production ==
"Wallflower" was co-written by former script coordinator Justin Doble and story editor Matt Pitts, while Treme and The Wire veteran, Anthony Hemingway, directed.

== Cultural references ==
During a scene of the episode, the song "Me Oh My" by Bryan Ferry can be heard. Also, the Mazzy Star song "Fade into You" plays on a jukebox in the diner. Walter names his two lab mice John and Yoko, a reference to The Beatles, and he also points out that octopuses "really do make gardens".

== Reception ==
=== Ratings ===
"Wallflower" first broadcast on November 18, 2011 in the United States. An estimated 2.87 million viewers watched the episode, with a 1.1 ratings share for adults 18-49. This was similar to the previous week, as they both earned the same ratings share. The episode was the season's fall finale and last to air in 2011, as the following episode would air on January 13, 2012.

=== Reviews ===
The A.V. Club writer Noel Murray graded the episode with a B, explaining "my major beef with “Wallflower” is that too much of the episode travels in a straight line, at least in regards to the main case. There are very few complications when it comes to finding Eugene... I wish there’d been a little more dimension to Eugene as a character (so to speak), a la last week’s Raymond Green or the second episode’s John McClennan, or at least a little more excitement in the procedural elements of 'Wallflower,' because there were moments in this episode that were really beautiful and touching, and I was disappointed that they were so isolated." Writing for Entertainment Weekly, columnist Jeff Jensen was more positive towards the episode. He loved Walter's experiment with the mice and the maze, and believed the death of Eugene Bryant was "one of the most poignant moments Fringe has ever produced." As the episode was the last to air for 2011, Jensen continued that the fourth season is "starting to find its narrative and emotional groove... As much as I’ve enjoyed the season so far, these first seven episodes have felt like an elaborate opening act for a main attraction still to come."

Fearnet's Alyse Wax noted "Wallflower" was "an intriguing one-off, but that is all. I'm ready for them to get back to the crazy mythology stuff. We haven't seen the alternates in awhile [sic?]. I miss them. We did have a nice little cliffhanger that seems to allude to a return to the insanity. In this third "reality," this alternate time stream, it is beginning to feel like maybe it is an entirely new universe."
