= Back to Where You've Never Been =

- Fringe episode
- Peter Bishop and Lincoln Lee are confronted by the alternate Olivia Dunham and Lincoln Lee for crossing over.
- Episode no.: Season 4 Episode 8
- Directed by: Jeannot Szwarc
- Written by: David Fury; Graham Roland
- Production code: 3X7008
- Original air date: January 13, 2012

Guest appearances
- Orla Brady as Elizabeth Bishop; Michael Cerveris as September; Jared Harris as David Robert Jones; Daren A. Herbert as Sgt. Kane; Ryan James McDonald as Brandon Fayette

Episode chronology
← Previous "Wallflower"	Next → "Enemy of My Enemy"
- Fringe season 4

"Back to Where You've Never Been" is the eighth episode of the fourth season of the Fox science-fiction drama television series Fringe, and the series' 73rd episode overall.

David Fury and Graham Roland co-wrote the episode, while Jeannot Szwarc directed.

== Plot ==
Peter (Joshua Jackson) fails to gain the support of the prime universe's Walter (John Noble) in returning to his original timeline, so Peter schemes with Olivia (Anna Torv) and Lincoln (Seth Gabel) to travel to the parallel universe so that Peter can ask Walternate (Noble) for help. To avoid crossing over via the Machine Room, Lincoln retrieves Walter's original dimension-crossing device, which in this timeline has been acquired by Massive Dynamic. The plan is for Lincoln to pose as the parallel universe's Lincoln and bring Peter to Walternate. Peter does not learn until later that Olivia has told Lincoln to discover whether Walternate is behind the appearance of a new class of shapeshifters.

Olivia remains behind while Peter and Lincoln cross over at the Orpheum theater. Though Lincoln temporarily succeeds in posing as his doppelganger, Lincoln and Peter's real identities are soon discovered by the parallel universe's version of Lincoln (Gabel) and Olivia (Torv), having been called off a case by Walternate himself. As Lincoln and Peter are being taken back to Fringe headquarters, the driver of their van diverts from the convoy after receiving a call ordering him to murder Peter and Lincoln. Before Fauxlivia and the parallel universe's version of Lincoln arrive, Peter shoots the driver and is able to get away, leaving the prime universe's Lincoln to confront Fauxlivia and the other Lincoln. They lock up Lincoln in a closet as Fauxlivia tries to convince alternate-Lincoln that Walternate's actions are suspicious: Walternate had taken them off of a case involving these new shapeshifters, clearly a Fringe case. Fauxlivia speculates that Walternate might be behind these new shapeshifters.

Peter travels to his mother, Elizabeth's (Orla Brady), home and convinces her to take him to Walternate. There, Walternate reveals that he had already known about Peter, as he had been "spying" on the prime universe. Peter explains that the prime universe does not trust Walternate, believing him to be responsible for the new shapeshifters. Walternate calls in his lead scientist, Brandon (Ryan James McDonald), to vouch for him, but surprises Peter by shocking Brandon unconscious with a special device, revealing Brandon to be a shapeshifter. Walternate is aware that these new shapeshifters have started to infiltrate his government, and the only reliable method he has found to detect them is the tazer-device, but that this will not be effective as it is fatal to humans. He requests for Peter to return to the prime universe to gain their trust on his behalf, as he believes that Peter, as a neutral party, is the only person he can truly trust. Only then will Walternate help him return to his timeline.

Fauxlivia and Lincoln discover the location from where a phone call to one of the drivers was made, and get Broyles' (Lance Reddick) permission to investigate the source. After they depart, Broyles contacts David Robert Jones (Jared Harris), and warns him of the arrival of Fauxlivia and Lincoln; Jones is shown to have several more shapeshifters ready for deployment.

In the prime universe, Olivia wakes up at the theater to find the Observer September (Michael Cerveris) sitting in one of the theater's front rows, shot in the chest. September warns her that he has seen all possible futures, and in all of them Olivia has to die. The Observer disappears before she has a chance to help him.

== Production ==
"Back to Where You've Never Been" was co-written by co-producer Graham Roland and co-executive producer David Fury, while being directed by French director Jeannot Szwarc. The episode was shot in October 2011.

Actress Anna Torv noted that the episode was similar to the eighth installment of the third season, in that it really helped kickstart the remainder of the season. She also said that "Back to Where You've Never Been" was "a really wonderful one for" Joshua Jackson, as there was "a lot of meaty stuff for [him] to do, which is great. This season — and I know the [producers] have said it — is Peter’s season."

== Reception ==
=== Ratings ===
"Back to Where You've Never Been" was first broadcast on January 13, 2012 in the United States after a two-month hiatus. An estimated 2.87 million viewers watched the episode, and had similar ratings to the last aired episode in November 2011.

=== Reviews ===
"Back to Where You’ve Never Been" received positive reviews. Noel Murray of The A.V. Club gave it an "A-", calling it a "mostly terrific" episode that effectively advanced the season's story, though he noted some confusion in the alternate-reality setup. He praised the tension and thematic focus on identity and trust.

Andrew Hanson of the Los Angeles Times highlighted the episode's balance of emotional moments, such as Walter's reflection on his wife's suicide, with plot twists involving Walternate and shape-shifters. Hanson described the episode as "inventive, emotional, clever and fun".
