= Worlds Apart (Fringe) =

- Fringe episode
- Walter Bishop (right) and his parallel universe doppelganger "Walternate" discuss the ramifications of losing Walternate's biological and Walter's adoptive son, Peter Bishop, should they deactivate the bridge. Critics praised the technical work to create this scene using the solitary work of John Noble, playing both Walters, who also was praised for his acting during this scene.
- Episode no.: Season 4 Episode 20
- Directed by: Charles Beeson
- Story by: Graham Roland
- Teleplay by: Matt Pitts; Nicole Phillips
- Production code: 3X7020
- Original air date: April 27, 2012

Guest appearances
- David Call as Nick Lane; Pascale Hutton as Sally Clark

Episode chronology
| ← Previous "Letters of Transit" | Next → "Brave New World (Part 1)" |
- Fringe season 4

"Worlds Apart" is the twentieth episode of the fourth season of the Fox science-fiction drama television series Fringe, and the series' 85th episode overall. It was co-written by series story editor Matt Pitts and DC Comics' Nicole Phillips based on a story by co-producer Graham Roland. Charles Beeson served as director.

The series depicts members of a Federal Bureau of Investigation "Fringe Division" team based in Boston, Massachusetts as they investigate a series of unexplained, often ghastly occurrences, which are related to mysteries surrounding a parallel universe. In this episode, David Robert Jones (Jared Harris) employs former Cortexiphan subjects to create simultaneous earthquakes across the globe, leading Dr. Walter Bishop (John Noble) to hypothesize that the end of both the prime and parallel universes is imminent. The two worlds must decide whether to close the bridge that was repairing the parallel universe, or they may all face destruction.

"Worlds Apart" first aired on April 27, 2012 in the United States. The episode featured the return of David Call and Pascale Hutton, two guest actors not seen since the second season finale. It aired in the wake of the official renewal of a fifth season for the series. An estimated 3.1 million viewers watched the episode, a small increase from the previous episode. Critical reception was generally positive, as many highlighted the performances as well as the scene between the two Walters.

== Plot ==
Several earthquakes strike simultaneously across the globe, at the same time and locations in both the prime and parallel universe. The combined Fringe teams agree that David Robert Jones is behind it, the quakes the result of stresses of bringing the two universes into synchronization so that he can collapse both of them. The teams also conclude that Jones has found a means, through the previous "experiment" in Westfield, Vermont ("Welcome to Westfield"), to ride out the destruction of both universes. The idea of shutting down the bridge created by the Machine is brought up, believing that the bridge is enabling Jones' plan. However, this is considered a last resort, as destroying the bridge will affect the healing of the singularities in the parallel universe.

When a second simultaneous set of earthquakes occur, the parallel universe's version of Nick Lane (David Call) approaches Agent Lincoln Lee (Seth Gabel) of the prime universe, believing him to be the parallel universe's version of Lee. Lee feigns familiarity, learning that Nick had visions of being at the epicenter of the quake before it began. When Lee reports this to Olivia Dunham (Anna Torv) in the prime universe, she suddenly recalls her Cortexiphan trials including fellow subject Nick Lane, and with the team's help, identifies that other Cortexiphan subjects are the epicenter of these quakes, linking to their parallel universe versions to achieve synchronization.

Believing that by taking in one of the Cortexiphan subjects they can stop the effects of another quake, a willing Lane from the parallel universe travels to the prime and is hooked to Walter's (John Noble) equipment. Olivia also hooks herself up, allowing her to communicate what she sees in Lane's mind. When the prime version of Lane attempts to get into the right position, Olivia is able to identify his location, and he is captured in time. However, despite disrupting the process for Lane, earthquakes continue across the world. Walter estimates that the next set of quakes will cause both universes to collapse.

The captured Lane expresses his belief that Jones is helping the prime universe to defeat the parallel one. Olivia tries to convince him of Jones' true intentions. Eventually, Lane agrees to show the Fringe team a location where he once met with Jones. The team raids the site but finds nothing; meanwhile, Lane escapes custody using his abilities. With only hours left until the next set of quakes, as projected by a watch that Lane was wearing, plans are made to shut down the bridge before this time runs out.

Walter and Walternate (Noble) start the Machine equipment to overload, which will take several minutes, after which they can pull the power and deactivate the Machine. Lee states to Peter (Joshua Jackson) that he will be staying in the parallel universe, where he feels at home, reflecting a previous conversation Peter had with Lee about staying with Olivia in the prime universe. Walter and Walternate have a heartfelt discussion over Peter, and Walter expresses concern that if the bridge disappears, so will Peter. The other Fringe members say their goodbyes to their counterparts. Eventually, the Machine is overloaded and deactivated, and the parallel universe aspects of the room disappear; Walter is pleased to see Peter remains.

== Production ==
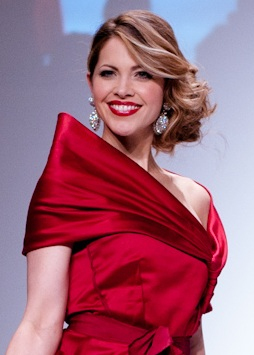
Actress Pascale Hutton reprised her role as Sally Clark from the second season finale "Over There".

Fringe story editor Matt Pitts and DC Comics' Nicole Phillips co-wrote the teleplay, based on a story by co-producer Graham Roland. English director Charles Beeson, known for his work on the science fiction television series Supernatural and Terminator: The Sarah Connor Chronicles, directed "Worlds Apart", his second episode of the season (the other being "Making Angels").

In an on-set interview with The Huffington Post, actor John Noble explained that the episode's primary storyline concerned the bridge between the two worlds. The third season finale, he explained, ended with the two universes healing themselves with the help of a "bridge". He remarked, "What happens if that bridge now begins to be used as a conduit for evil? That's the issue we're facing. What do you do? What do you do with this wonderful discovery? Do you keep it? What do you lose if you lose it? For example, if we didn't have that [link], we... wouldn't have all these wonderful characters that we've grown to love. What would happen? I think we have to face that issue. We have to face the issue of 'How long can you keep this alive, this link between interlacing the two universes?'"

"Lincoln's interest is being piqued by this other side, because there are other opportunities that exist, it's not even that there's more fish in the sea, there's more than one sea."

— Actor Seth Gabel on his character's decision to stay in the alternate universe

Guest stars David Call and Pascale Hutton reprised their characters Nick Lane and Sally Clark, respectively. Both actors had last appeared in the second season finale "Over There". Lead actress Anna Torv was pleased with their return, explaining, "A few faces from the past pop up, which is always fun."

The reappearance of Nick Lane and his storyline helped resolve an earlier plot point from "Over There," in which he was recognized by Fringe agent Lincoln Lee before dying. Noble noted that "Worlds Apart' and the rest of the fourth season brought back a number of characters from the series' "rich history", including Sally, Nick, and David Robert Jones. "This episode," he commented, "is bringing those things back together for us as we face the decision of what to do. Do we keep the worlds together? How do we keep them together without creating the monster that is happening? How do we stop this monster from happening? That's what this is all about."

== Reception ==
=== Ratings ===
"Worlds Apart" was first broadcast on the day following the announcement of the renewal of Fringe for a final shortened fifth season. The episode saw a small increase in viewership from the previous week, with an estimated 3.09 million viewers. In the adult demographic, the episode received a 1.0/3 ratings share, which means that it was seen by 1.0 percent of all 18- to 49-year-olds with television sets, and 3 percent of all 18- to 49-year-olds watching television at the time of broadcast. Fringe finished in fourth place among both total viewers and adults, behind episodes of CSI: New York, Grimm, and Primetime: What Would You Do?.

=== Reviews ===
"Worlds Apart" received generally positive reviews from television critics. Entertainment Weekly writer Jeff Jensen noted that with the closing of the bridge, "Fringe effectively pulled the plug on the creative idea that defined the best years of the show. [...] I don't think we can understate the passing of the parallel world premise." While he said he would miss the lost characters, especially Fauxlivia, the series "got the emotions [of their departure] just right." He added his hope that the characters would be revisited. In an interview, Pinckner said that they had spoken to Fox executives about closing off the bridge, to which one executive partner reportedly said, "I was so sad. I had tears in my eyes when we closed the door". The executive added that despite having initially thought the idea of doppelganger characters as a poor one, she admitted that she "was so wrong".

Jensen went on to praise Walter and Walternate's conversation as "devastatingly perfect," commenting "Just the very action of sitting, of Walternate choosing to literally to meet Walter at his lowest moment, was extraordinarily moving." Dave Bradley of SFX magazine highlighted the episode's acting as one particular positive element, praising Torv and Noble for "delivering perfect double performances." Bradley also praised the scenes between the two Walters and two Astrids, writing that the "moments of connection make the decision to split the universes apart incredibly poignant." Los Angeles Times writer Andrew Hanson also praised the Walter-Walternate scenes, explaining that after their seated conversation "you almost forget the two characters are played by the same actor. If this isn't the year that John Noble gets recognition for his performances in Fringe, it will be a crime."

The A.V. Club's Noel Murray graded the episode with an A, describing "Worlds Apart" as an "exciting, emotional episode" that "seems to resolve some of this season's storylines while setting up the upcoming two-part season finale." His favorite part of the episode was when the two teams worked together; he gave particular attention to the Walter-Walternate talk, remarking, "The last scene between the two Walters is something that I've been waiting to see for years now, and John Noble nails both sides of the conversation. It's now one of the whole series' signature moments: Walter and Walternate, side-by-side." Other critics also lauded the conversation between Walter and Walternate over Peter.

In a 2013 list, Den of Geek ranked "Worlds Apart" as the seventh best episode of the entire series, explaining that it "perhaps [is] a little rushed, but overall this is a satisfying conclusion to a number of major plot threads. Airing directly after "Letters of Transit", the closing off of a number of dangling stories and characters in this episode allowed the remaining two episodes of season four and all of season five to deal with matters closer to home, and tie up the show's most important remaining mystery, the Observers."
