= Fringe season 4 =

Fringe
- Season 4
- Region 1 DVD cover
- No. of episodes: 22

Release
- Original network: Fox
- Original release: September 23, 2011 – May 11, 2012

Season chronology
- ← Previous; Season 3 Next → Season 5

The fourth season of the American science fiction television series Fringe premiered on Fox on September 23, 2011, and concluded on May 11, 2012, consisting of 22 episodes. The series is produced by Bad Robot in association with Warner Bros. Television, and its showrunners were Jeff Pinkner and J. H. Wyman. The show was officially renewed for a fourth season on March 24, 2011. Lead actors Anna Torv, John Noble, and Joshua Jackson reprised their roles as FBI agent Olivia Dunham and the father-son duo Walter and Peter Bishop. Previous series regulars Lance Reddick, Jasika Nicole, and Blair Brown also returned. Previous recurring guest star Seth Gabel was promoted to series regular. Prominent guest star Leonard Nimoy and first season guest star Jared Harris reprised their roles in the alternate timeline storyline. Former main cast member and previous recurring guest star Kirk Acevedo, however, did not reprise his role.

The season follows the truce between the two inextricable universes through a bridge Peter created after his consciousness was driven forward fifteen years to make a different choice in activating the doomsday device, as seen in the third-season finale. The first part of the season establishes an alternate timeline through the premise of one single character's absence: Peter himself. After being erased by the Observer named September (Michael Cerveris), subtle and drastic changes occur. An amber title sequence replaces the traditional blue opening sequence, and thus the new timeline was dubbed the "Amber timeline". The differences in history without Peter are remarked upon casually in each episode.

The fourth season received generally positive reviews by television critics. Despite its low ratings, viewership was more stable than the previous season which saw a 2.5 million viewership drop from its premiere to the finale. The season premiered with 3.48 million viewers and concluded with 3.11 million viewers. Reviewers reacted well to the reintegration of Jackson's character in the alternate timeline, the return of David Robert Jones (portrayed by Harris), and the performances of Torv and Noble, who each played differing versions of their original characters. Criticisms toward the season were pacing issues in its first-half, unanswered questions regarding strong similarities in established history despite Peter's absence, and lack of answers. The series was renewed for a reduced thirteen-episode fifth and final season on April 26, 2012, of which this season's episode "Letters of Transit" serves as an introduction.

== Season summary ==
After making use of the Wave Form Device to create a bridge between the two universes, Peter's actions have led to a timeline drastically different than the Observers desire. September prevents his initial choice in the second season flashback episode "Peter". He no longer saves a seven-year-old Peter from drowning in 1985 after Walter crossed to and back from one universe to another to cure him. As such, a new timeline is formed and background history of the characters is altered forever. The bridge has created a healing effect on the parallel universe, and both Fringe teams resolve their former differences and begin to work together.

Olivia and (now more sheltered and reclusive) Walter continue to explore Fringe events, but are aware of a memory of Peter that haunts them. Due to their actions, Peter suddenly materializes in this timeline, though his identity is not initially known nor is he trusted. However, as he spends time with the Fringe team, Olivia starts to gain memories of the original timeline, and though both are initially worried about this effect, allow it to continue on, rediscovering their romance from before. During one case, a wounded September appears to Olivia, warning her that she dies in every future that he can see, before disappearing. September later appears to Peter after he activates a strange artifact, which acted like a homing beacon to September. September explains the other Observers hid this universe from him purposely, and that this timeline is Peter's true home.

As part of the change of the original timeline, David Robert Jones remains alive and is able to cross back and forth between the two universes, using an advanced army of shapeshifters, the parallel universe's version of Nina Sharp, and the parallel Broyles, whom he has blackmailed to initiate events. He gathers a large collection of the mineral amphilicite, which enables him to build devices that can merge the two universes for disastrous results. Both Fringe teams fear that a larger plan is afoot, and later, when Jones is able to trigger microquakes across the globe in both universes simultaneously, the two sides agree that Jones must be stopped before both worlds are destroyed.

Their first action is to disable the bridge created by the Wave Form Device, believing this enables the simultaneous events, but this proves ineffective. The prime universe Fringe team continues to track Jones' actions, and discover that he is in the employ of William Bell, still alive in this timeline, who seeks to destroy both universes as to create a void for a third one to be made, with Olivia's Cortexiphan abilities enabling this event to occur. In a stalemate, Walter shoots Olivia in the head with a bullet, disrupting Bell's plan, and as Bell escapes, Walter helps to extract the bullet from Olivia, her Cortexiphan healing her body.

After Olivia's recovery, she finds herself pregnant with Peter's child. Walter is approached by September and told that "they are coming", alluding to a future in 2036 where the Observers have taken over humanity.

== Cast ==
=== Main cast ===
- Anna Torv as Olivia Dunham
- Joshua Jackson as Peter Bishop
- John Noble as Dr. Walter Bishop
- Lance Reddick as Phillip Broyles
- Blair Brown as Nina Sharp
- Jasika Nicole as Astrid Farnsworth
- Seth Gabel as Lincoln Lee

=== Recurring cast ===
- Michael Cerveris as September/The Observer
- Jared Harris as David Robert Jones
- Michelle Krusiec as Nadine Park
- Eugene Lipinski as December
- Leonard Nimoy as Dr. William Bell
- Orla Brady as Elizabeth Bishop
- Rebecca Mader as Jessica Holt
- Ryan McDonald as Brandon Fayette

== Episodes ==
No. overall	No. in season	Title	Directed by	Written by	Original release date	Prod. code	US viewers (millions)
66	1	"Neither Here Nor There"	Joe Chappelle	Story by : Jeff Pinkner & J. H. Wyman & Akiva Goldsman; Teleplay by : J. H. Wyman & Jeff Pinkner	September 23, 2011	3X7001	3.48
A week passes after the Fringe divisions in both universes have begun to work together to solve the impending collapse. Olivia investigates a case where Lincoln Lee from the prime universe witnessed a man with translucent skin attacking and killing his partner Robert (guest star Joe Flanigan) while tracking a sale of illegal weapons. Lincoln insists on following Olivia and the division around to solve the case for his partner's sake and he discovers that there is more than one victim and multiple bodies have turned up undisclosed by the Fringe division. They eventually track down not one, but two killers with the same translucent skin at their hideout and kill them, but not before the killers burn their research notes and a third suspect, unobserved, gets away. Olivia decides to bring Lincoln into the loop and have him visit the hangar with the doomsday device with both teams setting up inside the facility. Lincoln meets Fauxlivia as she is being informed by Olivia about a biological device recovered from one of the killer's bodies. Olivia deduces they are a new form of shapeshifters originated from humans. Throughout the episode, Peter Bishop appears and disappears and Walter gets a fright upon seeing him although not recognizing him due to the changed timeline. The Observer is sent to "correct" the timeline by erasing Peter's presence completely but does not go through in the end, while Walter is shocked to see Peter appear again on the reflection of his TV screen at the end of the episode.
67	2	"One Night in October"	Brad Anderson	Alison Schapker & Monica Owusu-Breen	September 30, 2011	3X7002	3.05
The parallel universe Fringe division requests the prime universe's counterparts to help capture a highly intelligent serial killer, John McClellan, who has killed his victims by freezing their brain while experiencing the happier moments of their life. Fauxlivia wants Olivia to escort the prime universe's version of John, a professor in forensic psychology, to track down his movements, but without revealing the existence of the parallel universe to him. John helps to identify the killer's movements, but soon comes to realize that he is in the parallel universe, and escapes from the Fringe team. He ultimately meets with his doppelganger, and together they discover that though sharing the same life as a boy, their lives diverged due to the presence of a woman named Marjorie in the prime John's life that helped to soothe his homicidal tendencies. The parallel universe's John uses his equipment to experience the joy of Marjorie from his counterpart, but becomes distraught over his actions and kills himself. The experience traumatizes the prime universe's John, removing the memories of his experience in the parallel universe and of Marjorie. At the end of the episode, Walter starts hearing Peter's voice, begging for his help.
68	3	"Alone in the World"	Miguel Sapochnik	David Fury	October 7, 2011	3X7003	3.18
Two young bullies are found dead and in just a few hours they rot to an advanced state of decomposition. The Fringe team investigates and uncovers a fungus is behind the decay. The fungus is emotionally tied to a young boy, Aaron, who Walter bonds with while having more hallucinations of Peter. He fears he will be considered insane and put back in the mental institution if he tells anyone about them. When the Fringe team discovers the fungus can be killed using ultraviolet light, it becomes clear that due to his emotional connection with the fungus, Aaron would die too. Walter succeeds in severing the connection and the fungus is killed without Aaron being harmed. In the end, Walter finds out that Olivia has similar hallucinations of Peter and concludes that he is not insane.
69	4	"Subject 9"	Joe Chappelle	Jeff Pinkner & J. H. Wyman & Akiva Goldsman	October 14, 2011	3X7004	3.16
Olivia uncovers a dangerous force that may be connected to past experiments with the nootropic drug Cortexiphan. The investigation forces Walter to leave the lab for the first time in years and travel with Olivia to interview Cameron James, one of the Cortexiphan subjects Walter experimented on. After gaining James' help, his talent enables Peter Bishop to return to the timeline.
70	5	"Novation"	Paul Holahan	J. R. Orci & Graham Roland	November 4, 2011	3X7005	3.21
Peter Bishop has returned to the altered timeline, but no one recognizes him. Walter refuses to have anything to do with him. Meanwhile, the Fringe division deals with the threat of the translucent shapeshifters when a former Massive Dynamic scientist is taken by a shapeshifter, who forces him to create a serum that will enable them to change their form more quickly. Eventually, the shapeshifter escapes and the Fringe team is no closer than before.
71	6	"And Those We've Left Behind"	Brad Anderson	Robert Chiappetta & Glen Whitman	November 11, 2011	3X7006	3.03
All over Boston, time anomalies are occurring, looping back four years. The Fringe team traces the anomalies back to a married couple. The husband has used his wife's research to construct a machine that reverts their home to the state four years prior, before she fully suffered from rapid deterioration of Alzheimer's disease. He has been convincing her younger version to complete her research to allow him to stabilize the time bubble. With help from Walter, Peter enters the house, and he and the wife persuade the husband to shut down the machine, which is later disassembled by the FBI. The husband intends to rebuild it later, but he discovers that his wife has blacked out all the equations she had written down. In the end, Peter notes that the husband's success with the time bubble started simultaneously with his appearance in the alternate timeline.
72	7	"Wallflower"	Anthony Hemingway	Matthew Pitts & Justin Doble	November 18, 2011	3X7007	2.88
A man mysteriously dies by an invisible force. The Fringe Team traces it to an old experiment done by Massive Dynamic on a newborn baby who was born with an incurable genetic disease which allowed him to become invisible. Meanwhile, Olivia is suffering from sudden headaches, secretly revealed to be the work of Nina Sharp, who is dosing her nightly with Cortexiphan.
73	8	"Back to Where You've Never Been"	Jeannot Szwarc	David Fury & Graham Roland	January 13, 2012	3X7008	2.87
Wanting to return home, Peter gets the help of Olivia and Lincoln to travel to the alternate universe to try to find his way home, while the Fringe teams in both universes continue to deal with the threat of shapeshifters, as their origin mystery expands. Lincoln has his own purposes for crossing Over There, namely to spy on Secretary Bishop, much to Peter's concern. After nearly being shot by two Fringe agents, Peter is able to get his mother's help to see the Secretary, who is revealed not to be the cause of the shapeshifters. Meanwhile, while awaiting Lincoln and Peter's return, Olivia is visited by September, who warns her that she will die in all possible futures.
74	9	"Enemy of My Enemy"	Joe Chappelle	Monica Owusu-Breen & Alison Schapker	January 20, 2012	3X7009	3.19
The alternate Fringe team tracks the shapeshifters to a revived David Robert Jones, who survived the universe crossing with Peter's erasure from time. After they capture him, he initiates several terrorist attacks until he is released. After being released, he disappears only to appear in the prime universe to steal a rare mineral, 'Amphilicite', only to cross back to the parallel universe and disappear. In the wake of Jones' escape, the two universes agree to work together to defeat Jones and his army.
75	10	"Forced Perspective"	David Solomon	Ethan Gross	January 27, 2012	3X7010	3.33
Olivia copes with September's warning. Peter and the team track a girl who has predicted several deaths and drawn them in perfect detail. They discover that her name is Emily, and her father has been moving his family across country and changing their identities, trying to stay ahead of people he believes are trying to take Emily and experiment on her ability to see the future. He does not allow the Fringe team to help out any further, but Emily meets Olivia privately and shows her her latest picture: a pile of dead bodies. The drawing does not give enough information to guess where the deaths may occur, but Walter is able to pinpoint the location, a nearby courthouse, by hypnotizing Emily. The team races there, and the man who is about to blow up the courthouse is persuaded by Olivia to stand down. Emily's final drawing shows her own death, and she dies from an overload of electrical activity in her brain caused by her ability, with her father holding her.
76	11	"Making Angels"	Charles Beeson	Akiva Goldsman & J. H. Wyman & Jeff Pinkner	February 3, 2012	3X7011	3.20
Alternate Astrid discreetly visits her counterpart to talk about her recently deceased father. Fauxlivia is sent to escort her back. Peter and Olivia track a killer targeting people who will die a painful death to save them from suffering, using a toxin from the future. With help from Alternate Astrid, they identify their man as a TSA agent who cleared all his victims prior. He gained knowledge of their future by solving certain equations when he was a mathematics professor at MIT. Having survived a car accident that took his father and twin brother, he overheard his mother saying that God had taken the wrong son, which motivated him to act as a savior. When the Fringe team is about to arrest him, he fires a gunshot towards Olivia, purposely missing her, upon which she returns fire and kills him. The parallel versions of Astrid and Olivia return to their universe after warm goodbyes. Two Observers, including December, learn the killer found the toxin he used on Reiden Lake; it had been lost by September when he had unsuccessfully tried to save Peter. December learns that Peter has reappeared in this timeline.
77	12	"Welcome to Westfield"	David Straiton	J. R. Orci & Graham Roland	February 10, 2012	3X7012	3.05
Peter, Olivia and Walter come face to face with a Fringe event as they get trapped in Westfield, Vermont, a town that there's no escaping from and most of whose inhabitants act delusionally. Walter realizes they have been fused with their doppelgangers from the parallel universe, giving them a new set of memories. The town has been merged with its counterpart too, which makes it unstable. When it is on the point of collapsing, Walter and Peter locate an area that acts like the eye of a storm, and lead all survivors there. The rest of Westfield vanishes. The remainder of the Fringe team is able to reach the survivors and help them; Olivia learns that they found several strange devices equipped with amphilicite planted around the perimeter of Westfield and believes them to have been set by David Robert Jones. Throughout her stay in Westfield, she has remembered more and more things from the original timeline. At the end of the episode, she kisses Peter as though they are in a relationship.
78	13	"A Better Human Being"	Joe Chappelle	Story by : Glen Whitman & Robert Chiappetta; Teleplay by : Alison Schapker & Monica Owusu-Breen	February 17, 2012	3X7013	3.00
A reporter is murdered by three teenagers. The Fringe team learns that another teenager, Sean Martin, in a mental institution witnessed the murder at a long distance by hearing voices from "outside" his head. Analyzing blood from an assailant injured in the attack, Walter finds that Sean and the assailant must have a common ancestor. Olivia and Lincoln learn that Sean was conceived by in vitro fertilisation, and that the killed reporter had been looking into the process. Walter concludes that Sean is reading the thoughts of other in vitro children who are protecting themselves like animals in a hive. The doctor that performed the process, Dr. Frank, admits to the team that he modified and donated samples of his own DNA to re-introduce instinctive traits into humans, attempting to build "a better human being". As Olivia and Peter try to retrieve Dr. Frank's files, they are ambushed but manage to capture their attackers. However, a second pair of attackers kills Dr. Frank. Walter discovers that Olivia has recently been given doses of Cortexiphan. He and Lincoln confront Nina Sharp and demand an inspection of the Cortexiphan samples in Massive Dynamic's headquarters. Those samples have been replaced with food coloring, implicating Nina. Meanwhile, Olivia is abducted. She regains consciousness tied up opposite Nina, who is also tied up.
79	14	"The End of All Things"	Jeff Hunt	David Fury	February 24, 2012	3X7014	3.08
David Robert Jones holds Olivia and Nina captive, torturing Nina to activate Olivia's Cortexiphan-induced abilities. Olivia recognizes from Nina's answers to questions about their shared past that this Nina is in fact the one from the parallel universe. However, Olivia plays along, explaining to Nina that her abilities could only be activated by being near Peter. The Observer September appears in the lab, bleeding from a chest wound. With Walter's help, Peter enters the Observer's mind to learn of Olivia's location. He finds out that the Observers are scientists from one possible future of humanity. When September tried to observe the point where Peter's cure was discovered, he caused several unintended changes within the timeline, including the war between the two universes. September explains that Peter's reappearance may be a means to set things right, and insists he find a way to reunite with his original Olivia. Finally, September tells Peter to "go home". Peter wakes up in the lab, and September's body vanishes. Following September's advice, Peter returns to his home, from where he is abducted by Jones' men. He is brought to the same facility as Olivia and tied up. Olivia uses her powers to free herself and Peter, but Jones and Nina are able to escape. Peter tells Olivia that he fears he has been unintentionally imprinting his memories of "his" original Olivia onto her. Consequently, he leaves her.
80	15	"A Short Story About Love"	J. H. Wyman	J. H. Wyman & Graham Roland	March 23, 2012	3X7015	2.87
Several wives have died shortly after the passing of their respective husbands. Discovering traces of the husbands' DNA on the bodies of the wives, Walter suspects that the killer is using pheromones taken from the husbands as a perfume to get close to the wives. They identify the murderer as a former employee of a perfume company, and are able to save his last intended victim and apprehend him. As he is taken away, he admits he was trying to discover what love was, so that he could reproduce it. During the investigation, Olivia realizes that she is in love with Peter. After the conclusion of the case, she tells Nina that she will let the memories she is gaining from Peter's original timeline override her own memories, even if this means she will forget the times she spent with Nina. Simultaneous to these events, Peter has left Boston to stay away from Olivia, so as not to further erode her original memories. Walter calls him back, identifying that the Observer September has implanted something in Peter's eye during the events of the previous episode. The small disc reveals an address. Equipment found there enables Peter to bring back September, who explains that the other Observers had hidden the universe from him. In response to Peter's questions about trying to return to his own timeline, September states that Peter is actually home; he was never truly erased from time as his love for his friends and their love for him brought him back. September vanishes, and Peter and Olivia rejoin each other with a kiss.
81	16	"Nothing As It Seems"	Frederick E. O. Toye	Jeff Pinkner & Akiva Goldsman	March 30, 2012	3X7016	3.08
A passenger, Marshall Bowman, on a plane transforms into a strange beast, due to a "designer virus" with which he has been injected. Peter recognizes this as a case from his original timeline but in this timeline, Bowman never fully transformed on the plane, allowing it to land safely. However, while under investigation by the TSA, Bowman transformed and attacked the agents before dying. Meanwhile, Olivia, having accepted the replacement of her memories with those from Peter's original timeline, is determined to be unfit for field work because she can't remember her "real" past. Lincoln Lee is put in charge of the Fringe team. Peter uses his recollection of the Bowman case to lead the team to Daniel Hicks, who was to receive the designer virus before he too transformed. Hicks, now transformed, escapes. The team finds out that the Hicks creature is nocturnal and can fly. Lincoln leads the team to stop the creature along with a woman who was caring for it. The creature is killed, while the woman is unable to supply answers about where the designer virus originated from. Phillip Broyles tells Olivia that while she may be losing part of her memories, she is still an asset and is allowed back to active duty. The episode ends on a revelation of a container ship that contains a number of other transformed humans and other creatures at sea.
82	17	"Everything in Its Right Place"	David Moxness	Story by : J. R. Orci & Matthew Pitts; Teleplay by : David Fury & J. R. Orci	April 6, 2012	3X7017	3.01
Lincoln Lee, following the death of his long-time partner and the recent changes in Olivia's memories that have caused her to forget her romantic meetings with him, struggles to find his place in the Fringe team. When running an errand in the parallel universe, he offers to help Fauxlivia with a case involving the murders of several criminals. During the investigation, he meets his alternate, Captain Lincoln Lee, and recognizes the close, romantic connection between Fauxlivia and Captain Lee. The Fringe division discover shapeshifter extraction marks in the bodies of the criminals, though more advanced than the means used by the initial models. After another attack on a criminal, the team finds and captures the shapeshifter. He calls himself Canaan and was the first prototype of a new kind of shapeshifter created by David Robert Jones. Broyles secretly contacts the Nina Sharp of the parallel universe, who arranges for a sniper near the building where Canaan is being held. When the sniper attempts to kill Canaan, Fauxlivia kills the shooter while keeping Canaan safe, but Captain Lee is injured and later dies in hospital. Canaan agrees to help Fringe and takes on the appearance of the sniper, allowing him to enter Nina's secured facility. He is able to override the facility's security controls for Fringe to raid the site. Nina and several others are captured. However, Captain Lee's death shatters Fauxlivia's emotions. Agent Lee takes Canaan to the prime universe, where Walter and Peter promise to help fix him. Lee returns to help Fauxlivia recover from her loss.
83	18	"The Consultant"	Jeannot Szwarc	Christine Lavaf	April 13, 2012	3X7018	2.84
In the prime universe, three people are killed by a mysterious force. Consulting the parallel universe's Fringe division, the Fringe team learn the counterparts of the victims died in a plane crash at the same time. Walter crosses to the parallel universe and determines that the two universes normally resonate at different frequencies, but that someone synchronized the oscillation of these three people. Then a woman in the prime universe, whose parallel universe counterpart drowned when her taxi drove into a river, coughs up water and suffocates. Examining the taxi, the team find a device filled with amphilicite, a mineral used by David Robert Jones. Walter concludes that Jones is trying to sabotage both universes. Fauxlivia, Lincoln and Astrid suspect there is a mole within Fringe. Walter gives Fauxlivia the idea that it may be Broyles. She tricks Nina into revealing Broyles' complicity. Unknown to them, Broyles has agreed to collaborate with Jones in order to maintain a supply of life-giving medication for his son. Jones has recently given Broyles a device to plant within the bridge connecting both universes. The Fringe team track down Broyles, who gives himself up, having previously contacted his prime universe counterpart to arrange his surrender. Lincoln stays with Fauxlivia. Walter returns to the prime universe to study the device, recognizing it as Jones' work, and that if it had been planted, it could have collapsed both universes.
84	19	"Letters of Transit"	Joe Chappelle	Akiva Goldsman & J. H. Wyman & Jeff Pinkner	April 20, 2012	3X7019	3.03
In 2036, the Observers have taken over the Earth and established a totalitarian regime using their superior technology and their ability to read the minds of most humans. They are helped by human "Loyalists". Some members of the current Fringe team, including Etta and Simon, are part of the resistance. Walter has spent the past 21 years in amber and has recently been freed in the hope that he will be able to build a device that will allow humankind to defeat the Observers. However, his brain has been damaged and he does not remember how to build the device. Simon and Etta turn to Nina, learning that Walter had William Bell remove a piece of his brain. The team manage to retrieve it from the old Massive Dynamic facility, tightly controlled by Observers, in part due to the inability of the Observers to read Etta's mind, and restore Walter's memories. Walter explains that the Observers made the Earth uninhabitable by 2609, traveled back in time and took over the planet. He kills approaching Observers and Loyalists using an antimatter bomb, then he leads Simon and Etta to where Peter, Astrid and William Bell have been ambered. Astrid is freed. Simon sacrifices himself to the amber in order to push Peter free, while Walter severs Bell's hand for later use. Peter realizes that Etta is his daughter.
85	20	"Worlds Apart"	Charles Beeson	Story by : Graham Roland; Teleplay by : Matthew Pitts & Nicole Phillips	April 27, 2012	3X7020	3.09
Several earthquakes occur at the same time and locations in both universes. The combined Fringe teams agree that David Robert Jones is behind the quakes; he is trying to collapse the universes. The idea of shutting down the bridge is brought up, believing that the bridge is enabling Jones' plan. However, this is considered a last resort, as destroying the bridge will affect the healing of the singularities in the parallel universe. When a second set of earthquakes occurs, the parallel universe's version of Nick Lane approaches Lincoln Lee of the prime universe. This way, the Fringe teams learn that Nick had visions of being at the epicenter of the quake before it began. Olivia in the prime universe concludes that Cortexiphan subjects like Nick's counterpart are the epicenter of the quakes, linking to their parallel universe versions to achieve synchronization. With the help of Nick from the parallel universe, his prime version is captured when attempting to get into the right position. However, earthquakes still continue across the world. Walter and Walternate prepare to shut down the bridge before time runs out. Lincoln decides to stay in the parallel universe, where he feels at home. Walter and Walternate talk about Peter, Walter expressing concern that if the bridge disappears, so will Peter. The other Fringe members say their goodbyes to their counterparts. Eventually, the Machine is deactivated, and the universes are disconnected. To Walter's relief, Peter remains.
86	21	"Brave New World (Part 1)"	Joe Chappelle	J. H. Wyman & Jeff Pinkner & Akiva Goldsman	May 4, 2012	3X7021	2.73
When a fringe event causes people to spontaneously combust, Walter determines that the deadly nanites behind the combustion were created by his old business partner William Bell. The team faces off with David Robert Jones and through use of Olivia's cortexiphan powers, defeat and kill him. Walter goes looking for William Bell and finds him in a warehouse where he is collecting the designer monsters he has been creating. Astrid is shot as she and Walter try to escape.
87	22	"Brave New World (Part 2)"	Joe Chappelle	Jeff Pinkner & J. H. Wyman & Akiva Goldsman	May 11, 2012	3X7022	3.11
The Fringe team desperately attempt to prevent William Bell from destroying their universe to remake it in his own image. Bell utilizes Olivia's cortexiphan abilities to finish the process and Walter Bishop is forced to shoot and kill her to stop the destruction. As hinted in the previous episode, cortexiphan has regenerative abilities and the high content in Olivia's body allows her to heal from the deadly shot, which happens after the danger to the world has passed.

== Production ==
=== Crew ===
In May 2011, David Fury joined the series as a writer and producer, having previously worked with co-creator J. J. Abrams on Lost. His first writing credit included the season's third episode, "Alone in the World".

=== Writing ===
Peter's return will "give us an engine for the greater part of the season."

— Co-showrunner Jeff Pinkner discussing the consequences of how Peter returns

According to executive producers/showrunners Jeff Pinkner and J.H. Wyman, the fourth season would start with the idea that "Peter no longer exists", and also that the audience would "very much see the consequences of what happened in Seasons 1, 2 and 3". These consequences included changes in the past; Pinkner and Wyman noted that though Peter was the impetus for Walter to cross over starting the chain of events, in this alternate history, Walter and William likely would have found their own way to cross, leading to the same events but with some events that "may have happened differently". Specifically, they identified that instead of Walter being brought out of a mental institution by Peter, Olivia becomes the one that does this; this changes Walter's re-acclimation to the outside world, and further alters Astrid's fate, now a field agent instead of being Walter's caretaker.

The producers stated they would continue to employ the use of flashbacks episodes as they "deepened the emotions of these characters", using these as well as flash-forwards "if it suits the story and the things we are trying to get across". Pinkner and Wyman also stated that they viewed the premiere episode of the fourth season "like a new pilot" to draw in viewers who wanted to watch the show but did not know when to start. Actor John Noble later clarified that this approach can be used "to unravel some of that mythology a bit" to explain the impact of the disappearance of Peter to new viewers. Despite the apparent disappearance of his character, Joshua Jackson remained as a main cast member and his commitment to a full fourth season was confirmed. Jackson stated that Peter will be back on the show, but "will be different than he was before". This fact was played with at the 2011 San Diego Comic-Con where the Fringe cast appeared for a panel; a teaser video showed fake auditions for the open role of Peter, and included cameo appearances by Michael Emerson, Zachary Quinto, Greg Grunberg, Jorge Garcia, Danny Pudi, and Jeff Probst and concluded with Jackson himself dressed as an Observer.

=== Timeline differences ===
==== Summary ====
After September allowed Peter to drown, Elizabeth Bishop (Orla Brady) immediately committed suicide fifteen years earlier (mentioned in "The Man from the Other Side") in 1985 from the grief of losing her son twice (altered in "Back to Where You've Never Been"). Walter became mad with grief, wanting to destroy both universes to create his own idealized world acting as God ("Brave New World").

Walter still requested William Bell (Leonard Nimoy) remove pieces of his brain out of fear of who he was becoming (as seen in "Grey Matters", and mentioned in "Over There: Part 2"), but Bell took the idea on for himself anyway ("Brave New World: Part 2"). It is implied that Bell's intentions were always dubious in the original timeline, and his fate in the alternate timeline was merely incidental, hence why Junior Agent Amy Jessup (Meghan Markle) connected Fringe cases to the Bible, as Bell had been planning his own Noah's Ark. ("Night of Desirable Objects")

Olivia ran away from the Cortexiphan trials after six months according to "Subject 9", instead of connecting with Peter during the 1986 experiments to bring him home ("Subject 13"). Without opening up to Peter about her abuse, she still shot her abusive stepfather as a child ("The Cure") but finished him off in the new timeline ("One Night in October").

Walter hated Nina Sharp (Blair Brown) for the next 26 years; he blamed her for breaking the vial with the cure for Peter's disease—ultimately leading to the kidnapping and Peter's death ("Subject 9"); her subsequent guilt led her to gain guardianship of the Dunham sisters after Marilyn (Amy Madigan) died of cancer when Olivia and Rachel (Ari Graynor) were due to go into foster care ("Novation"). Following this, Olivia took on some of Nina's hobbies like horseback riding (seen in "The Cure") in her teenage years (seen in "Novation" and "Forced Perspective") while Rachel still met Greg and gave birth to Ella (Lily Pilblad), though their marriage remained intact and they had a second child named Eddie ("Nothing As It Seems"). "Brave New World: Part 2" reveals Senator Van Horn (Gerard Plunkett) was never replaced by a shapeshifter and is alive.

"Neither Here Nor There" shows that Olivia was able to release Walter from the mental institution without a living relative, instead of Peter originally ("Pilot"). However, without Peter, Walter has become reclusive and refuses to leave the laboratory. "Alone in the World" reveals monthly evaluations by the director of St. Claire's were a condition for Walter's release from the institution. The fourth season opener also reveals Walter was unable to save John Scott (Mark Valley) during the Flight 627 investigation, leaving Richard Steig (Jason Butler Harner)'s fate unknown in the rewritten timeline (as Scott killed him upon his recovery originally). Consequently, Astrid Farnsworth is a field agent to account for Walter's agoraphobia.

She had never crossed over to the parallel universe as her abilities were never enhanced or manipulated (as the initial experiments to try and send Peter home in 1986 never happened). ("Back to Where You've Never Been") Fauxlivia still took her place, as seen previously ("Over There: Part 2"), though Colonel Broyles never died as Olivia's brainwashing or Cortexiphan experiments were never conducted on her ("Entrada"). These events only occurred when Walternate became aware of her abilities from the Peter-influenced confession she made as a child ("Subject 13"), leaving the cases she solved in the parallel universe unresolved, such as predictive criminal Milo Stanfield (Michael Eklund). Another difference is Lincoln Lee (Seth Gabel)'s father is alive, after being previously being mentioned to have recently died in his first appearance ("Over There: Part 1").

Olivia was instead kidnapped by Fauxlivia in the prime universe ("One Night in October") and transported as a prison captive in the parallel universe for two weeks while Fauxlivia did espionage. ("Making Angels") "Back to Where You've Never Been" reveals Olivia is unaware of her ability to cross over (as initial experiments to try and send Peter home in 1986 never happened), also revealing she never sought treatment after her car accident from bowling alley attendant Sam Weiss (Kevin Corrigan), and as confirmed in the season five episode "Black Blotter", Olivia never met him in the alternate timeline.

"One Night in October" reveals Fauxlivia still lived with her boyfriend Frank (Philip Winchester) who had broken up with her after discovering she was pregnant with Peter's child ("Immortality"), though they later separated in the new timeline for undisclosed reasons ("The Consultant"). Meanwhile, Alternate Charlie married Mona Foster (Julie McNiven) from "Immortality" and was on honeymoon with her during the events of "One Night in October". Sally Clark (Pascale Hutton) and Nick Lane (David Call) are alive, having never crossed over to rescue Peter ("Worlds Apart"), but Lincoln was still blown up ("Everything In Its Right Place"), presumably due to a superhearing Olivia ("Night of Desirable Objects")'s absence to alert them of the bomb during Joshua Rose (Shawn Ashmore)'s apartment explosion ("Amber 31422"). Olivia also never met any Cortexiphan subjects as an adult until Cameron (Chadwick Boseman), meaning Nick was recruited by Jones earlier in the timeline than the events of "Bad Dreams".

Furthermore, without Peter, David Robert Jones (Jared Harris) successfully escaped into the parallel universe ("There's More Than One of Everything"), later appearing to cause havoc in both universes where he creates organic shapeshifters that appear human ("Back to Where You've Never Been"). Initially it is believed he crossed over to kill Bell, but it is revealed in "Brave New World: Part 1" he crossed over to impress him and become his protege.

== Reception ==
=== Critical reception ===
Fourth season promotional poster

On Rotten Tomatoes, the season has an approval rating of 100% with an average score of 7.1 out of 10 based on 12 reviews. The website's critical consensus reads, "A daring reset may baffle casual viewers, but those already enthralled by Fringe's knotty mythology will likely become even more invested."

IGN reviewer Ramsey Isler gave the fourth season a score of 7.5 out of 10, calling it "not Fringe's best." His criticisms were that he felt the first third of the season was "inconsistent", with some episodes feeling "aimless", and the absence of Joshua Jackson as Peter in the beginning of the season hurt the show. Isler was more positive of the second half of the season, labeling the episode "Enemy of My Enemy" as the turning point of the season, with the reintroduction of villain David Robert Jones (played by Jared Harris). He highlighted "The End of All Things" as the best of the season, saying it had "absolutely brilliant writing and clever plot twists". The episodes "A Short Story About Love" and "Letters of Transit" were also named standouts, with the latter episode being called "intriguing and bold". He also enjoyed the return of William Bell (Leonard Nimoy), calling it "the biggest and most welcome surprise of the season". He concluded in saying the two-part finale wrapped up "adequately", but felt the biggest strength was the setting up for the final season, with the world we saw in "Letters of Transit".

After viewing "Letters of Transit", the season's 19th episode, Entertainment Weekly columnist Ken Tucker stated, "I've said it before: One reason Fringe has a tough time attracting a big audience is that the mass audience that's dropped away doesn't realize how much heart and soul, how much well-wrought romanticism, has been poured into this series, while its cult audience is regularly grumpy that Fringe declines to turn into the sci-fi epic some seem to want it to be. I know this season's timeline switcheroo has alienated some viewers, but even when the show veers off into mythology complexities that start to give me the megrims, I keep faith that Fringe is going to bring it back to the heart of what matters."

=== Ratings ===
The season premiere was watched by an estimated 3.5 million viewers. It scored a 1.5/5 ratings share among viewers 18–49, up 25% from the previous spring's season finale. By the end of November 2011, Fringe was the network's lowest rated program.

According to a report released by Nielsen Company, Fringe was the only network television series among the top ten of most time-shifted shows of 2011. The report continued that time shifting increased the series' overall audience by eighty percent.

== Home media release ==
Fringe: The Complete Fourth Season
Set details	Special features
22 episodes; 6-disc DVD set; 4-disc Blu-ray Disc set; UltraViolet digital downloads (Blu-ray)	Beyond the Fringe comic book; "A World Without Peter" featurette; "The Observers" featurette; Peter Bishop audition tapes; Gag reel; Deleted scenes; Blu-ray exclusive featurettes: "The Scientist Roundtable" and "Fringe Decoded"
Release dates
United States; Canada	Australia
September 4, 2012	October 31, 2012
