= Everything in Its Right Place (Fringe) =

- Fringe episode
- Episode no.: Season 4 Episode 17
- Directed by: David Moxness
- Story by: J. R. Orci; Matt Pitts
- Teleplay by: David Fury; J. R. Orci
- Production code: 3X7017
- Original air date: April 6, 2012

Guest appearances
- Max Arciniega as Antonio Dawes/Canaan; Tim Guinee as Rick Pearce/Canaan; Biski Gugushe as Ted; Zahf Paroo as Bill

Episode chronology
← Previous "Nothing As It Seems"	Next → "The Consultant"
- Fringe season 4

"Everything in Its Right Place" is the seventeenth episode of the fourth season of the Fox science-fiction drama television series Fringe, and the series' 82nd episode overall.

It was co-written by J.R. Orci, David Fury, and Matt Pitts. David Moxness served as director.

== Plot ==
Agent Lincoln Lee (Seth Gabel), following both the death of his long-time partner by a shapeshifter, and the recent changes in Olivia Dunham's (Anna Torv) memories that have made her forget her romantic meetings with him, struggles to find his place in the Fringe division. With the main Fringe team preparing to take Gene, Walter Bishop's (John Noble) cow, for "grazing day", Agent Lee offers to take case dockets through the dimensional bridge to the parallel universe to allow Astrid Farnsworth (Jasika Nicole) time to spend with her father. Once through, however, Olivia's doppelganger, Fauxlivia (Torv), states that the dockets will have to wait as there is a new Fringe case on their side; Agent Lee offers to help.

They arrive at a parking garage, where the night before, a woman had been attacked by a man, but an unknown figure arrived and attacked the man, killing him before disappearing. The deceased man is recognized as a petty criminal, his profile fitting nearly two dozen other criminals that have gone missing in the last month, but this is the first time a body, horribly disfigured, had been left behind. The Fringe team suspects some type of vigilante justice. During the investigation of the scene, Agent Lee meets his doppelganger, Captain Lincoln Lee (Gabel) of Fringe division, finding him to be more outgoing and brash compared to his own mild-mannerisms. Agent Lee also recognizes the close, romantic connection between Fauxlivia and Captain Lee. On further talks with Captain Lee, Agent Lee is surprised to find their backgrounds were exactly the same, deviating only when Captain Lee decided to become more assertive in more recent years.

As the investigation continues, Agent Lee learns of how amber was used to quarantine areas of the parallel universe to protect it from singularities, but with the introduction of the bridge through The Machine, these areas are healing themselves, allowing the amber to be removed. In one such region, two workers discover nearly two dozen bodies in various states of decay in a church, and these are quickly identified as the missing criminals. The Fringe division discover telltale signs of shapeshifter extraction marks, though more advanced than the means used by the initial models created by Walternate (Walter's doppelganger). Fringe division hears of another attack on a criminal; Colonel Broyles (Lance Reddick) initially denies Agent Lee's suggestion of a manhunt but eventually relents when both Captain Lee and Fauxlivia agree. The team finds and captures the shapeshifter. They learn he calls himself Canaan, and was the first prototype of the new type of shapeshifter created by David Robert Jones, though ultimately cast aside. Canaan struggles with an identity crisis, feeling alone and rejected, having been promised by Jones to be fixed, but refuses to divulge any information on Jones' location or plans.

Unknown to the rest of Fringe, Broyles contacts the Nina Sharp (Blair Brown) of the parallel universe, who arranges for a sniper near the building where Canaan is being held. As the Fringe team prepares to escort Canaan to headquarters, the sniper attempts to kill him. Fauxlivia is able to kill the shooter while keeping Canaan safe, but Captain Lee has taken a bullet and is rushed to a hospital. Once secured, Agent Lee implores Canaan to help Fringe, noting how his life is not safe even from Jones. Canaan agrees, and takes on the appearance of the sniper, allowing him to enter the secured facility that Nina had hidden herself in. Believing that Canaan is the sniper, Nina lets down her guard, allowing Canaan to override the facility's security controls for Fringe to raid the site. Nina and several others are captured, and Agent Lee finds that the equipment in the facility can allow them to track down all the other shapeshifters in the area. As they are clearing out the building, they come to learn that Captain Lee's wound was fatal and he has died, devastating Fauxlivia.

Agent Lee takes Canaan across the bridge back to the prime universe, where Walter and Peter Bishop (Joshua Jackson) promise to help study and fix him. Lee then returns to help the emotionally distraught Fauxlivia to recover from her loss and to sort through the data collected from Nina's facility.

== Production ==
Consulting producer J.R. Orci and co-executive producer David Fury co-wrote the episode's teleplay, based on a story by Orci and story editor Matt Pitts. Fringe cinematographer David Moxness directed the installment.

== Cultural references ==
The episode takes its title from the song "Everything in Its Right Place" by English rock band Radiohead. When Lincoln Lee of the main universe references Batman in the context of the vigilante attacks in the alternate universe, his double and the alternate Olivia are confused. He goes on to explain the concept—a billionaire playboy dressing up in a cape to fight crime—and the alternate Fringe agents conclude that their equivalent is a character called M.a.n.t.i.s. This is in direct conflict with the comic covers seen in "Over There", one of which depicts Batman himself and another of which depicts the Batman symbol. Differences in comics between universes were also referenced in "Subject 13", in which young Peter cites that the Red Lantern is not supposed to be green; this reference is in agreement with the comic covers, one of which depicts Hal Jordan and Oliver Queen using the names Red Lantern and Red Arrow, respectively.

== Reception ==
=== Ratings ===
"Everything in Its Right Place" was first broadcast on April 6, 2012, in the United States on Fox. An estimated 3.01 million viewers watched the episode, marking a slight decrease in viewership from the previous episode.

=== Reviews ===
Cory Barker of TV.com named "Everything in Its Right Place" the 9th best of the series, saying, "this episode was interested in those incremental distinctions in personality—only here, Lincoln was the focus. I have my issues with Season 4 overall, but the development of Lincoln, in all versions, often paid great dividends for the show."
