= Nothing As It Seems (Fringe) =

- Fringe episode
- Episode no.: Season 4 Episode 16
- Directed by: Frederick E. O. Toye
- Written by: Jeff Pinkner; Akiva Goldsman
- Production code: 3X7016
- Original air date: March 30, 2012

Guest appearances
- Neal Huff as Marshall Bowman; Gina Holden as Kate Hicks; Clark Middleton as Edward Markham; Gabrielle Rose as Doctor Anderson

Episode chronology
← Previous "A Short Story About Love"	Next → "Everything in Its Right Place"
- Fringe season 4

"Nothing As It Seems" is the sixteenth episode of the fourth season of the Fox science-fiction drama television series Fringe, and the series' 81st episode overall. The case of the episode is a parallel observation to the events of the first season's "The Transformation", starting identically but then diverging.

It was co-written by Jeff Pinkner and Akiva Goldsman, while Frederick E. O. Toye directed.

== Plot ==
The Fringe team is alerted to a case involving a passenger, Marshall Bowman (Neal Huff), that had transformed on a plane into a strange beast, due to a "designer virus" with which he had been injected. Peter immediately recognizes this as a case from his original timeline ("The Transformation") but in this timeline, Bowman never fully transformed on the plane, allowing it to land safely. However, while under investigation by the TSA, Bowman transformed and attacked the agents before dying.

Meanwhile, Olivia Dunham (Anna Torv), having accepted the replacement of her memories with those from Peter Bishop's (Joshua Jackson) original timeline, is assessed to be unfit for field work because she can't remember her "real" past, forgetting even family details. Lincoln Lee (Seth Gabel) is put in charge of the Fringe team, though he is upset that Peter has won Olivia's heart over himself.

Peter is able to use his recollection of the Bowman case to lead them to Daniel Hicks, who was to receive the designer virus before he too transformed. Olivia joins them at Hicks' house, where Hicks, now transformed, escapes, injuring Lincoln.

However, Astrid discovers that Conrad Moreau, the bio-terrorist Peter says was responsible for Bowman and Hicks' transformations in the original timeline, died five years previously. This and the fact that Bowman didn't make the plane crash, as Peter remembers, suggest that events are playing out differently.

Walter Bishop (John Noble) worries that Lincoln may be infected by the virus, and keeps him in the lab to study him. Peter and Olivia identify a tattoo on Bowman's corpse with the help of Edward Markham (Clark Middleton), who in this timeline does not know Peter or Olivia. He is able to identify it as a cuneiform symbol of a cult that wants to create a new evolution of mankind, or "mutation by design". (And indeed the transformed Hicks is welcomed by a woman (Gina Holden) who gives him an injection and dreams of joining him in his "special" state.) Walter is able to link the group to Massive Dynamic, but Nina Sharp (Blair Brown), on searching the company's records for work in human transformation, finds the project files deleted by David Robert Jones, as he had overseen the project during his tenure with the company.

Watching Lincoln's behavior, Walter identifies that those infected with the drug use fat stored in their body as energy to fuel the transformation, while drugs carried by Bowman would be used to slow the transformation, allowing the user to survive it. Walter further identifies that the creatures are likely acquiring fat from the residue of plastic surgery clinics. Further recognizing that the Hicks creature is nocturnal and can fly, Lincoln leads the team to stop the creature along with the woman who was caring for it. The creature is killed, while the woman is unable to supply answers about where the designer virus originated from.

Phillip Broyles (Lance Reddick) admits to Olivia that while she may be losing part of her memories, she is still considered an asset and is allowed back to active duty. Walter speculates that Jones may be using these transformed humans as part of a scheme to take control of the fate of humanity. Marshall Bowman's sister, who had earlier claimed ignorance, is shown trying to motivate another man (Alessandro Juliani) to inject the transformation formula. The episode ends by revealing a container ship that contains a number of other transformed humans and other creatures at sea that are kept locked in cages in pairs.

== Production ==
"Nothing As It Seems" was co-written by consulting producer Akiva Goldsman and co-showrunner Jeff Pinkner. Former Fringe producer, Frederick E. O. Toye, returned to direct the installment.

== Cultural references ==
The opening sequence and main case of the episode were allusions to the first-season episode "The Transformation".

Peter breaks the ice with bookdealer Edward Markham by asking if he has Gene Wolfe's Lake of the Long Sun.

The song playing in Olivia's apartment while she talks to Peter is "Time Spent in Los Angeles" by Dawes.

Walter mentions that William Bell's father taught him Yiddish and later speaks a sentence in Yiddish. In real life as well, Bell's actor Leonard Nimoy grew up in a Yiddish-speaking household.

== Reception ==
=== Ratings ===
"Nothing As It Seems" received a rating of 3.1 million viewers with a 1.2 rating in the 18-49 demographic, an improvement upon the previous episode "A Short Story About Love" by 33.3%.
