= Alone in the World (Fringe) =

- Fringe episode
- Episode no.: Season 4 Episode 3
- Directed by: Miguel Sapochnik
- Written by: David Fury
- Production code: 3X7003
- Original air date: October 7, 2011

Guest appearances
- William Sadler as Dr. Bruce Sumner; Evan Bird as Aaron Sneddon; Connor Stanhope as Matthew Mitnovitz; Matteo Stefan as Brian O'Toole

Episode chronology
← Previous "One Night in October"	Next → "Subject 9"
- Fringe season 4

"Alone in the World" is the third episode of the fourth season of the Fox science fiction drama television series Fringe, and the series' 68th episode overall.

It was written by David Fury and directed by Miguel Sapochnik.

== Plot ==
Walter (John Noble) is struggling with the hallucinations of Peter (Joshua Jackson), but refuses to talk about it to the Fringe team or to his psychologist (William Sadler), fearing they will consider him insane and put him back in the mental institution.

The Fringe team is alerted to the discovery of the bodies of two teenage boys in a service tunnel; though only missing for less than a day, their bodies show signs of long-term decomposition and fungal infection. As the bodies are moved to Walter's laboratory and the nearby morgue, the team discovers evidence of a third boy, Aaron (Evan Bird), who may have been present at the time the other two were infected, and he is taken to Walter's lab. Walter, while examining Aaron, finds that the boy lives with his neighbors, his father having died and his mother being away on business travel in Europe. Aaron, however, appears unaffected by the fungus. Walter allows him to stay with him in the lab, bonding with him and explaining how he lost his own son Peter as well as the Peter from the parallel universe.

Walter observes that the fungus on the corpse in his lab continues to grow rapidly, but he is able to contain it just before it expels a deadly cloud of spores. The same happens to the body in the morgue, but they are unable to evacuate the facility in time, and two hospital staff are killed by the expelled fungal spores. The spores leave a network of tendrils that cover the morgue, and which continue growing towards the drains in the room. The Fringe team is able to kill the spores using ultraviolet light. They subsequently discover a much larger fungal network in the service tunnel. When they try to expose this network to ultraviolet light and high temperatures, Walter observes Aaron suffering from a high fever. Walter quickly surmises that the fungal network (which he refers to as "Gus") is actually part of a single organism that functions like a giant brain. "Gus" has been able to make a psychic link with Aaron, who had spent several days previously in the service tunnel, and if the organism is killed, Aaron will likely die. The Fringe team finds that the organism is growing rapidly, spreading out over several city blocks and to public places, and give Walter limited time to find a solution before they will be forced to kill the organism regardless of Aaron's health.

Walter races to find non-invasive ways to break the link between Aaron and the organism, ultimately concluding with reluctance that lobotomy may be the only answer. However, with the organism having breached a subway station, Broyles (Lance Reddick) orders its immediate destruction. As Olivia (Anna Torv) and Lincoln (Seth Gabel) prepare to destroy the fungus network by injecting a toxin (provided by Massive Dynamic) into its heart, Walter finds that Aaron has become emotional, fearing that there is no one that cares for him. Realizing that Aaron's emotions are feeding the organism, Walter comforts the boy. Aaron becomes tranquil at Walter's display of affection, and the organism starts to die out. The Fringe team is able to destroy the remaining organism without harming Aaron. Walter gives Aaron one of Peter's old toys as Aaron is taken off to a hospital.

In the epilogue, Walter determines that the only way to stop seeing visions of Peter is to perform his own lobotomy. Olivia arrives in the lab in time to prevent Walter from seriously hurting himself and learns that he has been seeing an unknown man for several weeks. Olivia pulls out a sketch that she drew of a man, the same person that Walter has been seeing, and Walter realizes that he is not insane. Olivia admits she does not know who the man is, as he does not appear in the FBI database. The two agree they need to figure out his identity together.

== Production ==
"Alone in the World" was the first Fringe episode written by co-executive producer David Fury, well known as a producer/writer of Buffy the Vampire Slayer and Angel, and a writer of several episodes on the television series Lost and 24. Fury joined the series after the end of the third season, in May 2011. Miguel Sapochnik, a collaborator on House and the 2010 film Repo Men, served as the episode's director.

Some television critics speculated that Walter's nickname for the fungus, "Gus", was a reference to Gustavo "Gus" Fring, a character from the television series Breaking Bad. The following day after the broadcast, Fury posted on Twitter to address this, explaining that Gus was simply short for fungus.

Guest actor William Sadler reprised his role as Dr. Sumner, Walter's therapist from St. Clair's. Sadler last appeared in the season one episode, "The Equation".

== Cultural references and music ==
Folk singer Bob Dylan's song "Quinn the Eskimo (Mighty Quinn)", covered by Manfred Mann, plays in the background while Walter examines Aaron. Because covers of the song have been "slightly altered and reinterpreted" for years, Entertainment Weekly writer Lanford Beard noted its use "seemed [a] particularly on-point metaphor for the cult show's current season." Walter says to Aaron that "Toys are meant to be played with", a reference to the film Toy Story. He then acknowledges this by saying he saw the movie with the talking toys and that he found it quite disturbing.

== Reception ==
=== Ratings ===
"Alone in the World" was watched by 3.2 million viewers, earning a 1.3 rating for the adults 18-49 range. This was an increase of 8% from the previous episode, even with a decline in the preceding Kitchen Nightmares episode.

=== Reviews ===
"I wish there’d been a little more to the plot of 'Alone In The Dark,' and more to do with the series’ master-plot. But I can’t fault Fury and Sapochnik for the many memorable moments and images in this episode: the eerie glow of Gus’ tendrils seen through night-vision goggles; the morgue guy refusing to answer the phone, and ending up frozen and decaying over an exploded corpse; Walter dumping another exploding corpse into a container just in the nick of time; and of course Walter sitting alone in the dark with a hammer and a spike and a book on lobotomization."

— The A.V. Club reviewer Noel Murray

Andrew Hanson from the Los Angeles Times expressed uneasiness that the victims were children, and was skeptical that Olivia and Lincoln would have removed their hazmat suits when encountering the center of the fungus. IGN writer Ramsey Isler rated "Alone in the World" 7.0 out of 10; he praised John Noble's performance and the special effects, but explained "the first 90% of this episode is basically 20 minutes of material stretched out over the majority of the episode. This story could have been told in a half-hour show, with much more exciting pacing." Isler did however enjoy the final minutes of the episode, calling it "an uplifting note to a rather depressing story, and for the first time this season it leaves our characters with an explicit purpose and direction."

The A.V. Club's Noel Murray gave the episode a B−, explaining that while the writers did a "solid job", it was "a big step down from last week's magnificent 'One Night in October'". He continued, "The problem is that the way the episode plays out requires Walter to save the day by talking Aaron out of the mental/emotional clutches of Gus, which isn't exactly the most visually dynamic climax to an action-adventure show. (Plus, the “talk down” has become kind of a cliché in genre fiction...) I liked the moment between Walter and Aaron earlier in the episode where he got the kid to admit that he intentionally led the bullies to Gus, but the big final moment between the two was less affecting." Murray concluded that he was surprised little was mentioned about the parallel universes.
