= And Those We've Left Behind =

- Fringe episode
- Episode no.: Season 4 Episode 6
- Directed by: Brad Anderson
- Written by: Robert Chiappetta; Glen Whitman
- Production code: 3X7006
- Original air date: November 11, 2011

Guest appearances
- Stephen Root as Raymond Green; Romy Rosemont as Kate Green; Victoria Bidewell as Anne

Episode chronology
← Previous "Novation"	Next → "Wallflower"
- Fringe season 4

"And Those We've Left Behind" is the sixth episode of the fourth season of the Fox science-fiction drama television series Fringe, and the series' 71st episode overall. The episode dealt with the Fringe team's investigation of a series of time loop fatalities.

Robert Chiappetta and Glen Whitman co-wrote "And Those We've Left Behind", while Brad Anderson directed. Real-life husband and wife Stephen Root and Romy Rosemont guest starred as a married couple behind the time loop, one an electrical engineer and the latter a professor of theoretical physics.

The episode first aired on November 11, 2011, in the United States to an estimated 3.07 million viewers. Its 1.1 ratings share for adults 18-49 resulted in a series low. Critical reception was generally positive, as television critics in particular praised the performances of guest stars Root and Rosemont.

== Plot ==
Peter Bishop (Joshua Jackson), who has only recently appeared unexpectedly in an alternate timeline (not Walternate's), is still being held by Fringe division, whose members have yet to come to fully trust him. Walter Bishop (John Noble) still disbelieves that Peter is his son, but, under orders from Broyles (Lance Reddick), studies him as a test subject.

The sequence of time fluctuations is found to occur along a golden spiral.

Fringe learns of several cases that involve time fluctuations. Broyles, while instructing Olivia (Anna Torv) and Lincoln (Seth Gabel) to investigate, orders them to bring Peter along to examine the scenes. Broyles is concerned that Peter's reappearance may have created further tears between the prime and parallel universe leading to these events. The three find the time events are localized, returning the affected area to conditions four years ago for short periods of time before dissipating, such as a building reverting to a fire-worn state, or a train crossing on a long-disused set of tracks. Peter finds himself further jumping through time near these events. Recognizing the presence of time manipulation, the three return to Walter's lab to try to find a pattern in the event. Walter initially refuses to help with Peter's involvement, but soon postulates that the events occur along a spiral defined by the golden ratio, and believe they will find the source of the disturbance at the center of the spiral. Lincoln and other agents use an extent of the spiral to try to predict future mishaps that may be more damaging, while Olivia and Peter arrange an FBI search of the spiral's center to find the source.

One FBI agent is vaporized while approaching a suburban home, and Walter recognizes that a time bubble is surrounding the home. Isolating the extent of the time bubble, they find the home belongs to a couple, Raymond (Stephen Root) and Kate (Romy Rosemont) Green; Kate was a distinguished professor in physics at a nearby university until three years ago when she was diagnosed with early-onset Alzheimer's disease. Walter devises a portable Faraday cage that Peter offers to wear to enter the time bubble safely. Inside, he finds that Raymond, a skilled electrical engineer, used Kate's research to construct a giant machine in the basement of their house that creates a temporary time bubble. Raymond has used the machine to revert their home to the state four years prior, before Kate fully suffered from rapid deterioration of Alzheimer's, and has been convincing her younger version to complete her research to allow him to stabilize the time bubble permanently. Raymond notes that he has successfully gotten the machine to work only in the last few days.

Lincoln informs the others that they have found the next time distortion event, threatening to flood drivers in a tunnel that did not exist four years prior. The younger Kate, having only recently discovered what Raymond has done, recognizes the side effects of the time bubble, and urges Raymond to shut it down, asking Peter to guarantee that Raymond will not be prosecuted due to his lack of understanding of the effects. As Peter discusses this with the FBI, Kate reveals she has completed the proper equations, and Raymond asks her to write them out in a notebook so that he can recreate the time bubble machine in a remote location. When Peter returns with his assurances of Raymond's fate, Raymond disables the machine; the house reverts to its present-day state, with Kate reliant on a wheelchair. The time distortion in the tunnel dissipates before it can harm anyone else.

The Fringe division and the FBI remove the time bubble equipment from the house; Raymond, having kept Kate's notebook, discovers that she had blacked out all the equations, leaving a final message to him to keep on living his life and giving her his love.

Back at Fringe division, Peter notes that Raymond's success with the time bubble started simultaneously with his appearance in the alternate timeline. Broyles thanks Peter for his help, and offers to allow him to stay in the home Walter owns on campus. Peter attempts to try to explain to the Olivia of this timeline his relationship with the Olivia of his original timeline.

== Production ==
"I think to play husband and wife, it's easier to emotionally connect quickly to a big emotional place, since we're actual husband and wife. You don't have a lot of time on television to do that usually. Us knowing each other so well -- we're probably knowing where the other person is going to go emotionally, was a help."

— Guest star Stephen Root

The episode was co-written by executive story editors Glen Whitman and Robert Chiappetta, while former Fringe producer, Brad Anderson, directed.

This episode guest stars real-life husband and wife Stephen Root and Romy Rosemont portraying the roles of Raymond and Kate Green, and is the first time they have played alongside each other in a creative work. Their appearance on the show came by way of a party at Northwestern University, where Rosemont had met with executive producer Jeff Pinkner. Pinkner asked Rosemont if her husband would be interested in guest-starring on a Fringe episode; Rosemont quickly affirmed he would, but only if she was also asked to participate.

== Music and cultural references ==
When Walter leaves Olivia and Peter behind in the lab, the song "No Time" by The Guess Who is playing in his room. While Peter and Olivia theorize in the lab, Walter listens on his headphones to the song "Too Much Time on My Hands" by American rock band Styx. Walter references the Marvel Comics superhero Spider-Man when directing Astrid to find his fannypack.

While studying the time anomaly, Peter Bishop consults the fictional book Cosmology by real-world physicist Sean M. Carroll.

== Reception ==
=== Ratings ===
"And Those We've Left Behind" was first broadcast on November 11, 2011, on the Fox network in the United States. An estimated 3.07 million viewers tuned in with a 1.1 rating for adults 18–49, a series low.

=== Reviews ===
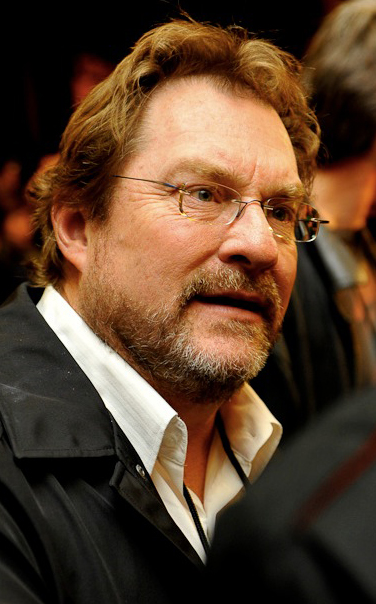
The performances of Stephen Root (pictured) and his wife Romy Rosemont were praised by critics.

The A.V. Club writer Noel Murray graded the episode with an A, calling it "an at once tense and moving episode of Fringe." Writing for Entertainment Weekly, Jeff Jensen believed the episode was "high grade Fringe, in my opinion, heartfelt and heady, a fraternal twin to the season 2 classic 'White Tulip.'" Jensen in particular highlighted the scene involving Peter's time-jumps while the Fringe team is investigating train tracks, comparing it to the experiences of main character Billy Pilgrim in the novel Slaughterhouse Five. He explained, "The storytelling, editing, and acting worked together marvelously to create a clever, clear, and funny passage. Kudos to Joshua Jackson for recognizing and nailing the wry comedy of it all."

Fearnet writer Alyse Wax also lauded "And Those We've Left Behind", explaining that "once you get past all the hardcore theoretical physics, this is a great episode. It's a pretty emotional episode but not in a sappy way." IGN's Ramsey Isler was pleased with Joshua Jackson's return, but criticized the writers for once again producing the 'mad scientist whose best intentions to save a loved one have dramatic consequences' trope.... each time the series does it we get diminishing returns." Murray, Jensen, and Hitfix reviewer Ryan McGee also noted references to the science fiction drama series Lost, including the use of the name Faraday as well as the mention of constants and the Red Sox winning the 2007 World Series. Critics praised the performances of guest stars Stephen Root and Romy Rosemont.

Jeff Jensen of Entertainment Weekly named "And Those We've Left Behind" the tenth best episode of the series, calling it "an episode worthy of one of Fringe's key inspirations, The Twilight Zone, with exceptional guest players taking center stage in a clever, wise, emotionally rich story in which an electrical engineer fought an unwinnable battle to gain more time with his beloved, Alzheimer's-affected genius wife via time travel tech. The couple was well-played by real life husband-and-wife Stephen Root and Romy Rosemont." In a similar 2013 list, Den of Geek ranked the episode as the fourth best episode of the entire series.
