= The Consultant (Fringe) =

- Fringe episode
- Episode no.: Season 4 Episode 18
- Directed by: Jeannot Szwarc
- Written by: Christine Lavaf
- Production code: 3X7018
- Original air date: April 13, 2012

Guest appearances
- Jared Harris as David Robert Jones; Curtis Harris as Christopher Broyles

Episode chronology
← Previous "Everything in Its Right Place"	Next → "Letters of Transit"
- Fringe season 4

"The Consultant" is the eighteenth episode of the fourth season of the Fox science-fiction drama television series Fringe, and the series' 83rd episode overall.

It was written by Christine Lavaf, while Jeannot Szwarc served as director.

== Plot ==
Three people in the prime universe are killed simultaneously when they are thrown into the air and into the ground by a mysterious force. In examining the bodies, the Fringe team discovers marks on the bodies consistent with seat belts. When they consult with the parallel universe's Fringe division, they learn that the doppelgangers of the three victims had died in a plane crash at the same time as the deaths in the prime universe.

Walter Bishop (John Noble) suspects that he can learn more about the victims by crossing via the Machine Room bridge to the parallel world, his first trip there (in this timeline) since abducting the young Peter Bishop (Joshua Jackson) in 1985 and causing the war between the universes. He meets up with Olivia Dunham's (Anna Torv) doppelganger, "Fauxlivia" (Torv), who is still mourning the death of her partner and friend, Captain Lincoln Lee (Seth Gabel). Agent Lincoln Lee (Gabel) of the prime universe has stayed with Fauxlivia to help her cope with her loss as well as to examine intelligence gained when they captured the parallel universe's version of Nina Sharp (Blair Brown), known to be cooperating with David Robert Jones (Jared Harris). Later, Walter speaks to Colonel Broyles (Lance Reddick) of the parallel universe's Fringe division, apologizing for the problems that his crossing caused. When asked by Broyles if he would do it again being aware of what transpired since, Walter admits that he would knowing that it would bring him his son back.

As Walter investigates the corpses and one of the hands of the victims in the prime universe, he determines that the two universes normally resonate at different frequencies, but that someone had found a way to synchronize the oscillation of these three people, the effects likely causing the plane to crash. His suspicions are confirmed when a woman in the prime universe, whose parallel universe counterpart drowned when her taxi drove into a river, is thrown across a store, coughs up water, and dies from asphyxiation. On examining the taxi, they find a briefcase containing a device filled with amphilicite, a mineral known to be part of Jones' destructive plans. Walter postulates that Jones is trying to synchronize both universes.

Fauxlivia, Lee, and Agent Astrid Farnsworth (Jasika Nicole) begin to suspect their work is being hampered by a mole within Fringe. Walter stays with Fauxlivia during the evening, the two having happily reconciled their past hatred from before when she had infiltrated the prime universe's Fringe team for nefarious purposes. Walter, in recounting the Sherlock Holmes case of "The Adventure of Silver Blaze", gives Fauxlivia the idea that Broyles may be their mole because of a conspicuous lack of evidence. She approaches Nina the next day, and tricks her into revealing Broyles' complicity with Jones' plan. Unknown to them, Broyles has been coerced by Jones into sabotaging the efforts of the Fringe division in order to maintain a supply of life-giving medication for his son, Christopher (Curtis Harris). Jones has recently given Broyles another device with orders to plant it within the bridge of the Machine Room connecting both universes.

The Fringe team track down Broyles, and are surprised when he readily gives himself up in the bridge room, having previously contacted his prime universe counterpart to arrange his surrender. Walter tells Fauxlivia to go easy on Broyles, as he was doing this to save someone he loved, just as Walter had done before. As Broyles is taken away, Lincoln offers to stay with Fauxlivia to continue to seek out Jones and his agents. Walter returns to the prime universe to study the device, recognizing it as Jones' work, and that if it had been planted, it could have collapsed both universes.

== Production ==
"The Consultant" was written by DC Comics' Fringe writer Christine Lavaf, while Smallville veteran, Jeannot Szwarc, directed the episode.

== Reception ==
=== Ratings ===
"The Consultant" first broadcast on the Fox network in the United States on April 13, 2012. An estimated 2.84 million viewers watched the episode, earning a 0.9 ratings share among adults 18 to 49. Among total viewers and the adult demographic, Fox placed fourth in its timeslot behind CBS, NBC, and ABC.
