= Subject 9 =

- Fringe episode
- Episode no.: Season 4 Episode 4
- Directed by: Joe Chappelle
- Written by: Jeff Pinkner; J. H. Wyman; Akiva Goldsman
- Production code: 3X7004
- Original air date: October 14, 2011

Guest appearances
- Chadwick Boseman as Cameron James; Elliot Mandelcorn as Dr. Janns; Brent Stait as Lt. Daniels

Episode chronology
← Previous "Alone in the World"	Next → "Novation"
- Fringe season 4

"Subject 9" is the fourth episode of the fourth season of the Fox science fiction drama television series Fringe, and the series' 69th episode overall.

It was co-written by J. H. Wyman, Akiva Goldsman, and Jeff Pinkner. Joe Chappelle directed the hour.

== Plot ==
Olivia (Anna Torv) experiences a strange disturbance in her home that creates a brief time distortion and attracts metallic objects to it before it dissipates. After explaining this to Walter (John Noble) and Astrid (Jasika Nicole), she and Astrid return to her home to examine the area, where the disturbance occurs again. Walter, observing this from his lab, surmises the effects are similar to one of his Cortexiphan children test subjects who displayed the ability for astral projection. Walter suspects the children who underwent the Cortexiphan nootropic drug trials are psychically linked, which is why Olivia is experiencing them. Walter can only recall the child subject as "Subject 9", but Olivia is able to secure records from Massive Dynamic naming Cameron James (Chadwick Boseman). While there, it is revealed to the viewer that, in this alternate timeline, the Cortexiphan trials were stopped after Olivia ran away from experiments as a child (à la Subject 13 but without Peter (Joshua Jackson) to bring her back). It is also revealed that Olivia now shares a much closer relationship with Nina Sharp (Blair Brown), who knew her growing up. Walter insists on leaving the lab for the first time in three years, joining Olivia to visit Cameron. Walter accidentally catches a glimpse of a letter from St. Claire's mental hospital in Olivia's coat; the letter is a request for Olivia's recommendation as to whether Walter should be reinstitutionalized or not.

Arriving at Cameron's apartment, they find he has changed names and will not be back until the next day. Olivia sets Walter up in a hotel room to spend the night, but he suffers from a panic attack fearing the germs and contaminants in the room. He also reveals that his wife, Elizabeth Bishop (Orla Brady), killed herself much earlier in this timeline, just after Peter died. He tells Olivia that he is glad Elizabeth can't see him like this. Olivia offers to treat Walter to a root beer float, during which Walter reveals his discovery of the letter and that he came on this journey in order to demonstrate to Olivia that he is still useful. As they talk, the disturbance appears, much larger and more destructive than before. It pursues Olivia and Walter out of the restaurant, but dissipates after being hit by a car.

After resolving the situation with the police, Olivia and Walter return to Cameron's home, catching him before he can evade capture. Cameron explains that he resents what Walter did to him, as his power makes it difficult to live a normal life. When the same disturbance appears, Cameron is able to use his power to disperse it, and Walter realizes that Cameron is not the cause of the disturbance; should more such disturbances continue to appear, they would eventually destroy the world. Walter convinces Cameron to help him to destroy the disturbance the next time it appears. They travel to a nearby power station and wait. When the disturbance does appear, Walter guides Cameron in actions that will stop it, but Olivia, recognizing a human figure within it, fires her gun, distracting Cameron long enough to cause the disturbance to disappear. As they try to figure out what to do next, Olivia receives a call from Broyles (Lance Reddick), explaining that they have come across a man who had just appeared in Reiden Lake and who knows far too many confidential details about Fringe.

After dropping off Cameron, Olivia and Walter go to the hospital where the man is being held, asking for Olivia by name. As Olivia is taken to the man, Walter discovers to his relief that Olivia has refused to allow him to be re-hospitalized. Olivia is shown to where the man is being held. The man is revealed to be Peter Bishop and he is much relieved to see Olivia. Olivia can only ask "who are you?"

== Production ==
"The episode where he does go out is to prove a point. It’s to say, ‘Look, I’m alright’ — whether he is or not, you’ll have to wait and see."

— Actor John Noble describing the episode with reporters

"Subject 9" was co-written by co-showrunners J.H. Wyman, Jeff Pinkner, and consulting producer Akiva Goldsman. Executive producer Joe Chappelle returned to serve as episode director.

Leading up to the episode's broadcast, actress Anna Torv noted that "Subject 9" is when "all of the little bits and pieces come into place – especially regarding the whole question of 'When is Peter Bishop going to make an appearance?'" She expressed appreciation that her character Olivia was able to grow closer to Walter due to Peter's absence, noting that this was her favorite part of the episode. Torv added that "Subject 9" would give viewers further insight into the differences between this Olivia and past Olivias, such as with the Cortexiphan trials and her parents.

In an interview with television reporters, actor John Noble noted that he loved the episode because of Walter's fears of venturing outside the lab conflicting with his fear of St. Claire's mental institution.

== Cultural references ==
Walter tells Olivia that his inspiration for setting up the cameras came from "the fight sequences in The Matrix", a 1999 science fiction action film. Television critics noted the title's similarity with "Subject 13", a third-season episode. Jeff Pinkner responded that "fans are free to read into whatever they want!" in relation to the two episode titles.

== Reception ==
=== Ratings ===
According to Nielsen Media Research, an estimated 3.13 million viewers watched "Subject 9" on its first American broadcast. The episode scored a 1.2 ratings share in the adults 18-49 demographic, down 8 percent compared to the previous week's episode.

=== Reviews ===
The A.V. Club columnist Noel Murray graded the episode with a B and expressed his unhappiness that "a good chunk of each episode so far has been given over to explaining what’s changed since the season three finale.... every time a season four episode has paused for one of those catch-up scenes, it’s seemed (to me anyway) like it’s been wasting time that could be better spent on monsters, or trans-dimensional warfare." Murray continued, "And yet for all the predictability and lack of action, I still really enjoyed 'Subject 9,' because it was so well-written and well-directed and well-performed." Andrew Hanson of the Los Angeles Times noted of the various timelines depicted in the series, "With any other show, this might have driven the audience crazy, but Fringe pulls it off. Mostly by going back to the history and characters and really delving into that bottomless well." Several media outlets highlighted John Noble and Chadwick Boseman's performances for praise.

Charlie Jane Anders of io9 believed that it was "the first truly great episode of Fringe season four, and one which gave me a lot of hope," explaining that "the show finally refocused back onto the elements that made it essential viewing in the past, in particular the tangled legacy of Walter Bishop. At last, we got to see Walter outside his lab once again — and the revolting, disorienting fresh air might not have been good for him, but it did wonders for our ability to appreciate him." Writing for SFX magazine, Richard Edwards expressed pleasure with Peter's return, though he thought it was "almost too easy, seemingly the result of a series of fortunate events and Olivia’s intuition rather than any grand plan... The fact that no one has any recollection of Peter – even though he remembers them – sets up the next few episodes nicely."
