= One Night in October =

- Fringe episode
- On a multiverse serial killer case, Olivia (left) bluntly reveals to her parallel universe doppelgänger (right) she killed her abusive stepfather (portrayed by Chris Bradford in "Subject 13" and "Lysergic Acid Diethylamide").
- Episode no.: Season 4 Episode 2
- Directed by: Brad Anderson
- Written by: Alison Schapker; Monica Owusu-Breen
- Production code: 3X7002
- Original air date: September 30, 2011

Guest appearances
- John Pyper-Ferguson as John McClennan; Jordyn Ashley Olson as Megan; Enid-Raye Adams as Nooren

Episode chronology
| ← Previous "Neither Here Nor There" | Next → "Alone in the World" |
- Fringe season 4

"One Night in October" is the second episode of the fourth season of the Fox science fiction drama television series Fringe, and the series' 67th episode overall. The episode was co-written by Monica Owusu-Breen and Alison Schapker, while Brad Anderson served as director.

In the episode, Olivia is informed by Broyles (Lance Reddick) that the Fringe division of the parallel universe has requested their help to locate a serial killer named John McClennan (John Pyper-Ferguson). With their own universe's John, a university professor, they try to locate the other John with his knowledge of himself while also trying to prevent him of being aware of the alternate universe itself as they cross over. The episode received acclaim from critics who highlighted the performance of Anna Torv's double duty, guest star John Pyper-Ferguson, as well as the exploration of the parallel universe and the use of love and sentimentality that leads to different lifestyle choices.

== Plot ==
Olivia Dunham (Anna Torv) is informed by Broyles (Lance Reddick) that the Fringe division of the parallel universe has requested their help to locate John McClennan (John Pyper-Ferguson), a highly intelligent serial killer who has taken more than 20 victims, drilled into their skull, and killed them by freezing their brains from the inside. The parallel Fringe division wants Olivia to bring the prime universe's version of John, a professor of forensic psychology who specializes in serial-killer profiling, to examine the last known residence of the Parallel John and try to deduce where he may be. Still cautious of the parallel Fringe's intentions, Olivia agrees to help. She meets with the Prime John, explaining their need, but without revealing the existence of the parallel universe. He offers to help, and willingly takes a tranquilizer that puts him to sleep during the transport to the parallel universe through the Machine Room bridge.

As Olivia waits with the parallel Lincoln Lee (Seth Gabel), Fauxlivia dresses as Olivia, and watches over John as he investigates the house. John becomes suspicious that many aspects of the home's owner match his own, but is able to conclude that the owner was jealous of those people who were happy. John reveals that he himself is hiding a dark secret: a need to understand why people are happy. During his abusive childhood, he experienced homicidal urges which he attempted to sate by killing small creatures; he mentions a change in his life that took him into criminal psychology but does not elaborate. When John finds a picture of his father, a farmer, he realizes something is amiss and storms out. Olivia is forced to stop him, and John soon becomes aware that he is in a parallel universe when he sees both Olivias together. They explain to him the crimes of his alternate self. Soon, another victim is taken by Parallel John. Olivia and the parallel Fringe team allow John time to recover in the bathroom before tracking this new case, but soon discover he has escaped. They conclude that John is probably headed towards the remains of his father's farm, and they set out in pursuit.

John, meanwhile, has met with his parallel self, who is preparing the latest victim in a makeshift machine that allows him to directly connect to the victim's brain and experience their happy memories but which ultimately kills the victim. The two Johns briefly struggle with the idea of their doppelgangers, but soon learn that while they shared the same youth, their paths diverged when their respective fathers discovered their cache of dead animals. In the parallel universe, John's father caught him and punished him, while in the prime universe, John ran away, stumbling and falling over. He was later rescued by a woman named Marjorie (Enid-Raye Adams), who, even after seeing the dead animals, loved and embraced him, telling him "Even when it’s the darkest, you can step into the light", a phrase he has since used to subdue his homicidal urges. The Parallel John becomes jealous of this, knocks his counterpart out, and connects him to the machine. When the Prime John awakes, Parallel John demands he tell him about Marjorie, using the machine to extract this memory from him.

Olivia and the Fringe team converge on the farmhouse but find it empty. Nearby they find the remnants of a barn and a storm cellar entrance. Entering it, they find both the kidnap victim, still alive, and the prime version of John, recovering from the trauma, while a shaken parallel version of John cowers nearby, overwhelmed with the impact that Marjorie had on John's life and regretting the murders he has committed. He commits suicide just as the Fringe team finds him. John is returned to the prime universe and taken to a hospital, the incident having caused him to forget the memories of the parallel universe as well as those of Marjorie, though he still remembers what she said to him.

Throughout the episode, Walter (John Noble) has covered up every reflective surface in his lab, trying to avoid the vision of Peter (Joshua Jackson) that he sees. In the final scene, Walter starts hearing Peter's voice telling him that he needs his help, leaving Walter even more panicked as to its source.

== Production ==
"One Night in October" was co-written by co-executive producers Alison Schapker and Monica Owusu-Breen. Former Fringe producer Brad Anderson directed the episode.

== Reception ==
=== Ratings ===
"One Night in October" was watched by 3.1 million viewers, a 1.2 ratings share, approximately 20% less than the 4th-season premiere episode, "Neither Here Nor There" from the previous week. The episode tied the series' lowest ratings for the 18-49 demographic.

=== Reviews ===
"One Night in October" received critical acclaim from television critics. The A.V. Club writer Noel Murray graded "One Night in October" with an A−, explaining that it "was a terrific hour of television, making excellent use of the resources Fringe has available to them right now, both behind the camera and in front." Andrew Hanson from the Los Angeles Times used the episode to declare Fringe the best science fiction television series currently on the air, and called "One Night in October" one of his top five favorite episodes of the series. Hanson concluded, "I cannot talk enough about how much I enjoyed this story...This is Fringe at its best, taking the out-there science fiction concepts and aligning them with a compelling human story. Seriously. Why aren’t more people watching this show?" Entertainment Weekly contributor Jeff Jensen praised Anna Torv's dual performance and called the episode premise "clever." Jensen did however express skepticism that they believed McClennan would not suspect he was in a parallel universe.

Charlie Jane Anders of io9 called it more interesting than the season premiere and enjoyed the serial killer premise. SFScope's Sarah Stegall wrote, "In what may well be the best-written episode of the entire show, Fringe brilliantly exploits its own alternate-world structure to show us the transformative power of love, a power so strong it can redeem the dark impulses that drive a fiend. And it does so with verve and heart, without sappy sentimentality. There is madness and love and tragedy and horror here, all seasoned by some fine performances and top notch writing." Many reviewers praised John Pyper-Ferguson and Anna Torv's performances, with Stegall writing that the former was "the best guest star performance" on Fringe to date. The A.V. Club staff highlighted the episode in their review of the best television shows of 2011.
