= Neither Here nor There (Fringe) =

- Fringe episode
- The new amber-tinted title sequence, featuring new terms such as 'Viral therapy', 'Philosopher's stone', and 'Existence'
- Episode no.: Season 4 Episode 1
- Directed by: Joe Chappelle
- Story by: J. H. Wyman; Jeff Pinkner; Akiva Goldsman
- Teleplay by: J. H. Wyman; Jeff Pinkner
- Production code: 3X7001
- Original air date: September 23, 2011

Guest appearances
- Michael Cerveris as September; Eugene Lipinski as December; Joe Flanigan as Robert Danzig; Michelle Krusiec as Nadine Park

Episode chronology
| ← Previous "The Day We Died" | Next → "One Night in October" |
- Fringe season 4

"Neither Here nor There" is the fourth season premiere of the Fox science fiction drama television series Fringe. The episode depicts the aftermath of the third season finale in which Peter Bishop disappears from his timeline. In the new, altered timeline, Olivia Dunham is joined by FBI agent Lincoln Lee after the latter's partner is murdered. The two work to investigate his death, which revolves around shape-shifting technology.

The episode was co-written by J.H. Wyman, Jeff Pinkner, and Akiva Goldsman. Joe Chappelle directed the installment. Wyman and Pinkner approached it as a new pilot and used the character of Lee to help introduce viewers to the series. As a result of Lee's inclusion, "Neither Here nor There" is the first episode to introduce his portrayer Seth Gabel, formerly a recurring actor, as a main cast member. Joe Flanigan guest-starred as his partner, Robert Danzig. The episode is also the first to briefly feature recurring actress Michelle Krusiec as Nadine Park.

"Neither Here nor There" was originally broadcast on September 23, 2011 on the Fox network to an estimated 3.5 million viewers. It scored a 1.5/5 ratings share among adults aged 18 to 49. Critical reception towards the episode was mixed, with several praising its special effects and Anna Torv's acting but criticizing elements of its story.

== Plot ==
At the end of "The Day We Died", Peter Bishop (Joshua Jackson) uses the Machine to create a "bridge" between the prime and parallel universe allowing the two sides to work together to resolve the instabilities in both universes; but in doing so, Peter vanishes. Because of this, Observer September (Michael Cerveris) says Peter never existed. Despite this, the Observers are aware of changes in the original timeline, with echoes of Peter appearing. December (Eugene Lipinski) charges September with assuring that the last memories of Peter are wiped out. Both universes have created a secure airlock-like system around the shared room housing the Machine within the bridge. At the start of the episode, the two Olivias (Anna Torv), still somewhat distrusting of the other, help to share relevant Fringe files between the two universes.

FBI agent Lincoln Lee (Seth Gabel) and his partner of five years, Robert Danzig (Joe Flanigan), are pursuing an arms dealer; while Lee apprehends the man, his partner is killed by a second, mysterious man with translucent skin and seemingly superhuman abilities. The skin of Danzig's body also becomes translucent after he dies. When forensics comes on the scene, Olivia and Astrid (Jasika Nicole) appear and take the agent's body without revealing their intentions. Lincoln follows Olivia to the lab, where he is introduced to the Fringe division. Despite Olivia attempting to keep Lincoln away, he continues to follow the investigation as they discover another victim killed in a similar manner. From a witness, they learn about the appearance of the killer, but are unable to identify him by name.

Olivia agrees to bring Lincoln onto the case, and shows him that there have been roughly thirty victims in the last several days, who have had no obvious connection or signs of death, other than that their hearts stopped. Lincoln reveals that Danzig suffered from Crohn's disease and was taking iron supplements, which leads Walter (John Noble) to realize that all of the victims were suffering from heavy metal poisoning, and that their killer extracted substances from their blood. Recognizing that several of the victims use commuter rail, Olivia initiates a manhunt at a nearby rail station. She and her team are then informed of the suspect's location, and after a chase, in which one of the pursuing FBI agents is killed and another shot in the leg, Olivia is able to kill the suspect, who also had translucent skin and had been experimenting on himself. Lincoln kills a second man with the same condition. As the FBI cleans up the area, a woman (Michelle Krusiec), also with translucent skin, watches from afar.

In examining the bodies, Walter discovers a bio-mechanical module similar to those they had previously seen in the shapeshifters that Walternate used. Olivia and Lincoln take the module to the Machine room. As Lincoln is stunned by the technology, Olivia gives the module to Fauxlivia, who promises to take it to Walternate to investigate.

During the episode, Walter is shown to be agoraphobic and unwilling to leave his lab after Olivia arranged his release from a mental asylum. He becomes panicked when he briefly sees images of a man, Peter, in the lab; Olivia attributes this to Walter lacking any foothold in reality. That evening, Walter is preparing for bed while September, outside, readies a device he has assembled to wipe out the remains of Peter's existence. But at the last moment September disarms the device and walks away. Later Walter sees yet another image of Peter on his television and is terrified.

== Production ==
=== Writing ===
The episode was co-written by co-showrunners J.H. Wyman and Jeff Pinkner, and consulting producer Akiva Goldsman. Executive producer Joe Chappelle directed. Pinkner and Wyman approached the episode "like a new pilot" to draw in viewers who wanted to watch the show but did not know when to start. They used Lincoln Lee as a tool to acquaint viewers with the new changes. Former guest actor Seth Gabel, who played Lee, joined the cast as a series regular for the fourth season. He believed his character allowed the audience to see Fringe Division from a new perspective. He explained, "You need a layman's perspective from time to time. The show has gotten so deep into this crazy, surreal scientific world that you need someone to enter every now and then to remind you this is not the common experience. You need someone to show you how far down the rabbit hole you’ve gone, so you don't become desensitized to it. I think Lincoln serves that for a while."

"While it is a huge risk to do these reset things inside of a show, I think our show softened the blow it a little bit in season three, by broaching the subject of alternates. I think if you were willing to go along with the alternate universe in season three, I think the new versions of these characters in season four are – I hope – less off-putting than they would have been without the preparation of the past few seasons."

— Main cast member Joshua Jackson on the risk of alienating fans with the season's timeline reboot

The showrunners had the episode center around the idea that "Peter no longer exists", and intended it to "set up the season arc from numerous characters' perspectives" to show viewers what to expect from the season. When discussing the season's arc, Fox and Warner Brothers wished to have Peter return as soon as possible, as they knew he was popular with fans. Pinkner and Wyman responded that to "really establish his absence [it] will take a little while", but knew that a longer wait would lead to audience frustration.

=== Title and casting ===
The fourth season premiere was initially called "A Sort of Homecoming", also the name of a song by rock band U2. The episode's opening credits featured a new amber-tinted sequence, which listed new fringe science terms like "Psychometry", "Gravitons", and "Existence". Pinkner said the new color of the credits "clearly [indicates] a universe without Peter in it." "Neither Here nor There" marked the first appearance of recurring guest actress Michelle Krusiec. Her casting was confirmed in July 2011. The episode also featured a one-time guest appearance by actor Joe Flanigan, who played Lee's partner Robert Danzig. Flanigan shot his scenes in July 2011.

== In popular culture ==
The scene in the diner where the Observers discuss Peter's existence featured "California Dreamin'" by vocal group The Mamas & the Papas. Other songs featured in the episode included "Rockin' Robin" by Bobby Day and "Cinderella in the Palace" by Sergei Prokofiev, the latter performed by the National Symphony Orchestra of Ukraine. Walter later quotes a line from the 1963 John le Carré novel The Spy Who Came In From The Cold.

== Reception ==
=== Ratings ===
"Neither Here nor There" originally broadcast in the United States on September 23, 2011 to an estimated 3.5 million viewers. It scored a 1.5/5 ratings share among viewers 18–49, meaning that it was seen by 1.5 percent of all 18- to 49-year-olds, and 5 percent of all 18- to 49-year-olds watching television at the time of broadcast. This ratings share was up 25 percent from the third season finale but down 21 percent from the season's premiere. Despite its low ratings, the episode was the highest-rated Friday premiere on Fox in six years. Among total viewers it came in fourth for the night but finished third among adults.

=== Reviews ===
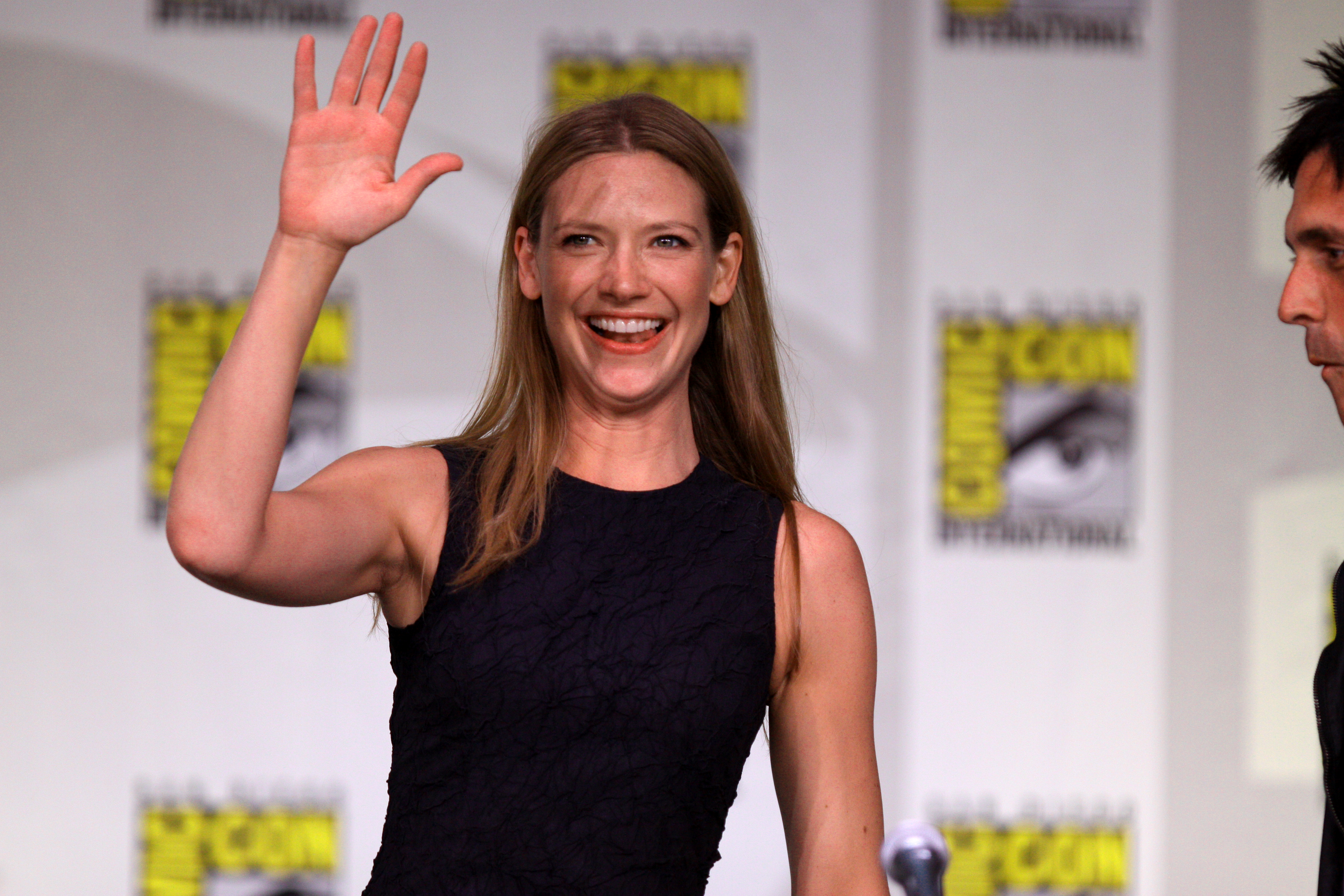
Among the main cast members, Anna Torv received the most praise from television critics.

Writing for The A.V. Club, Noel Murray gave the episode a "B", remarking that he "enjoyed the episode overall—largely because it's just such a treat to have be [sic] back in this world with these people—I'm not sure it was wholly successful in its attempt to play by the old rules." He added that after the opening exchange between Olivia and Fauxlivia, the episode "settles into a fairly typical" Fringe formula involving a "villain of the week" and a freakish event. Andrew Hanson of the Los Angeles Times praised Anna Torv's two performances and believed "the containment built around 'the Machine'" may "have been my favorite part of the episode."

Den of Geek selected the episode's special effects as a positive element, but was more critical of the episode as a whole. "As Fringe goes", the website explained, "this ended up a rather lightweight narrative, which was more about getting Lincoln established with Fringe, and providing a few new plotlines that the subsequent stories can expand on." IGN's Ramsey Isler was equally ambivalent, and gave the episode a score of 7.5 out of 10. He observed, "It isn't a bad episode. It's a good addition to the Fringe lore. It's well-written, has plenty of action, and the actors are great as usual. But it just doesn't feel like a fulfilling continuation of last season's cliffhanger, nor does it strike me as a fantastic new direction for the season."

Richard Edwards of SFX gave the episode 4 out of 5 stars, writing that it "chooses to mostly ignore exploring the implications [of Peter's disappearance] on the overall story arc in favour of a fairly run-of-the-mill (by Fringe standards, at least) case of the week. Even the potentially scintillating scenes between the alternate incarnations of the characters fail to materialise, aside from a couple of stilted encounters between the two Olivias." Edwards did however praise the premiere for its special effects, and for doing an effective job presenting the characteristics of a world without Peter, especially highlighting Lincoln's newcomer role as a lens for the audience.
