= Lincoln Lee =

Fictional character on the Fox television series Fringe

Lincoln Tyrone Lee
- Fringe character
- First appearance: "Over There, Part 1"
- Last appearance: "Liberty"
- Portrayed by: Seth Gabel

In-universe information
- Occupation: FBI Agent (prime universe); Fringe Division agent
- Family: Original Timeline: Jurist father (alternate universe; unseen and deceased); Alternate Timeline: Still-living hardware store owning father (both universes; alternate timeline for alternate universe); Deceased mother (both universes and timelines; unseen); Unnamed stepmother (alternate universe; alternate timeline)
- Spouse: Alternate universe Olivia Dunham
- Significant others: Kendra Lane (alternate universe, unseen); Alicia Vaskin (unseen)
- Children: Trevor Lee (son, seen in photo)

Lincoln Lee is a fictional character on the Fox television series Fringe (2008–2013). Lincoln first appeared in the season two finale on May 13, 2010. He is portrayed by actor Seth Gabel.

Initially, Gabel was cast for just the finale, and did not hear about his character's return until the end of the following summer. To date he has played four versions of his character, one in each universe and timeline. The actor was promoted to a full-time regular for the series' fourth season before departing at the end when his character remained in the alternate universe. Lee returned at the end of the fifth season, in the episode "Liberty".

== Arc ==
=== Parallel universe ===
In the episode "Over There", Captain Lincoln Lee is first introduced as a team leader for the parallel universe's Fringe Division. While confronting intruders from the prime universe, or the Other Side, Lee is severely burnt by firestarter Sally Clark, leaving his fate uncertain. Lee returned in the season three premiere, "Olivia", where he is recovering from his burns via his universe's advanced technology. He leads a team to find the previously incarcerated Olivia Dunham, who has escaped from Fringe Division. He is unaware that she is the Olivia from Our Side (rather than his colleague Fauxlivia, who is infiltrating the prime universe). After the death of Colonel Phillip Broyles, Lincoln is placed in charge of Fringe Division.

=== Prime universe ===
In "Stowaway", the prime universe version of Lincoln Lee is an FBI agent unaware of Fringe Division. In their first case together, he aids Olivia and Peter in an investigation of a suicidal woman incapable of dying.

=== Re-written timeline ===
In the fourth season premiere, in which the timeline has been reset due to Peter never having existed, Lincoln is unfamiliar with fringe science, and again meets Olivia for the first time. He helps her with a case regarding his dead partner, Robert and others, who were all attacked by shapeshifting human-hybrids. He eventually becomes her partner, aiding in later investigations.

After Peter reemerges in the timeline, Lincoln agrees to accompany him to the parallel universe and impersonate his doppelganger in order for Peter to gain access to Walternate. They are soon captured, but both sides agree to work together to discover who is responsible for the new shapeshifters. Lincoln begins to feel more and more disconnected with the world as Olivia is slowly reverting to the pre-written timeline version of herself, and feels the team dynamic has left him out of place. When a shapeshifter-related string of murders occurs in the parallel universe, Lincoln takes it upon himself to help out. In the process, he considers the differences in routes that he and his mirror took and finds little changed, leading to the question as to why they turned out so differently. In the end of the episode, Lincoln's parallel is killed by a sniper and he chooses to remain in the parallel universe until the case is solved. In the episode "Worlds Apart" Lincoln remains in the parallel universe even after the bridge is closed.

== Development ==
"I was nervous when they started writing the character in that direction: a very heroic action hero. That’s not something I’d ever played before, and I wasn’t sure I could really pull it off. I’d never really seen myself with a gun. Never really thought I could look cool holding a gun. As the first few episodes started to come in, I felt more confident when I realized I didn’t look like a total doofus."

— Seth Gabel on becoming an action star

Actor Seth Gabel was initially hired as a guest star for one episode, the second season finale "Over There Part 1". Describing the character as "a scientist-slash-FBI hero", Gabel first thought he was going to look like "such a doofus holding a gun"; he and the series crew contemplated "how to make me look like a scary intimidating person", and became convinced of his portrayal after seeing the finished episode. Gabel was unsure if the character would even survive the episode, much less be a recurring character. While during shooting the episode writer/director Akiva Goldsman continually dropped hints to the actor that Lincoln Lee would be more involved in the story, Gabel had to wait the entire summer before finding out he would be returning. Upon Gabel's return for the third season, he had to undergo four to five hours of make-up in order to show his character's burns.

In the season three episode "Stowaway", Gabel began playing the prime universe version of his character. The actor described this Lincoln Lee as someone in the FBI who has "no idea about Fringe Division. He's more of a desk jockey [who] eventually comes to believe there is much more than reality suggests." Gabel was upgraded to a season regular for the show's fourth season. As executive producer Jeff Pinkner explained, "We just fell in love with him, which is why we wanted to bring him back. Thus far, we’ve spent very little time with one version of him, the Lincoln Lee on their side, so I think that we’ll probably want to explore his character as well."

== Personality ==
Despite identical life events, the personalities of the two Lincolns vary significantly between universes. This is a curiosity that the Lincoln from the primary universe dwells on after he crosses over to help with a shapeshifter related case in the alternate universe.

The primary universe Lincoln is a reserved "nice guy" whose thick black glasses and neatly side parted hair underscore his mundane sense of style. While he's a capable agent, he exhibits undertones of lack of confidences in himself with respect to relationships, and feelings of inadequacy socially and professionally. These feelings are amplified in the presence of his partner in the 2nd timeline, Olivia Dunham, who he expresses romantic interest in, but with whom a romantic relationship is out of reach.

Unlike his primary universe counterpart, the Lincoln in the alternate universe is upbeat and outgoing, and from the perception of primary universe Lincoln, grandiose, "arrogant" and "narcissistic". Forgoing the suit and tie, alternate universe Lincoln gravitates towards a more "bad boy" image, which consists of T-shirts, leather jackets, and spiked hair. He does not wear glasses. Despite their differences, commonalities can occasionally be seen in the personalities of the two Lincolns. In the episode "Immortality", for example, when the Lincoln from the alternate universe is promoted to captain after the untimely death of the alternate universe Broyles, he confesses to his longtime partner, "Fauxlivia", his lack of confidence and feelings of doubt as to his abilities to fill Broyles' shoes, commenting that he "feels like he's missing something, that Broyles would see something he wouldn't"

Like the Lincoln in the primary universe, alternate universe Lincoln seems to possess a romantic interest in "his" Olivia Dunham (Fauxlivia) as well, and as in the primary universe, these feelings are not entirely reciprocated, the relationship remaining a friendship. However unlike primary universe Lincoln, alternate universe Lincoln doesn't seem to be nearly as bothered by this.

=== Relationships ===
All versions of Lincoln Lee seem to harbor romantic feelings for their respective Olivia Dunhams. While the Olivia Dunham in the primary universe 2nd timeline seems to acknowledge this and hints that she might be open to pursuing the relationship, this is short lived due to the re-emergence of the primary universe 1st timeline Olivia, who is madly in love with Peter Bishop.

== Reception ==
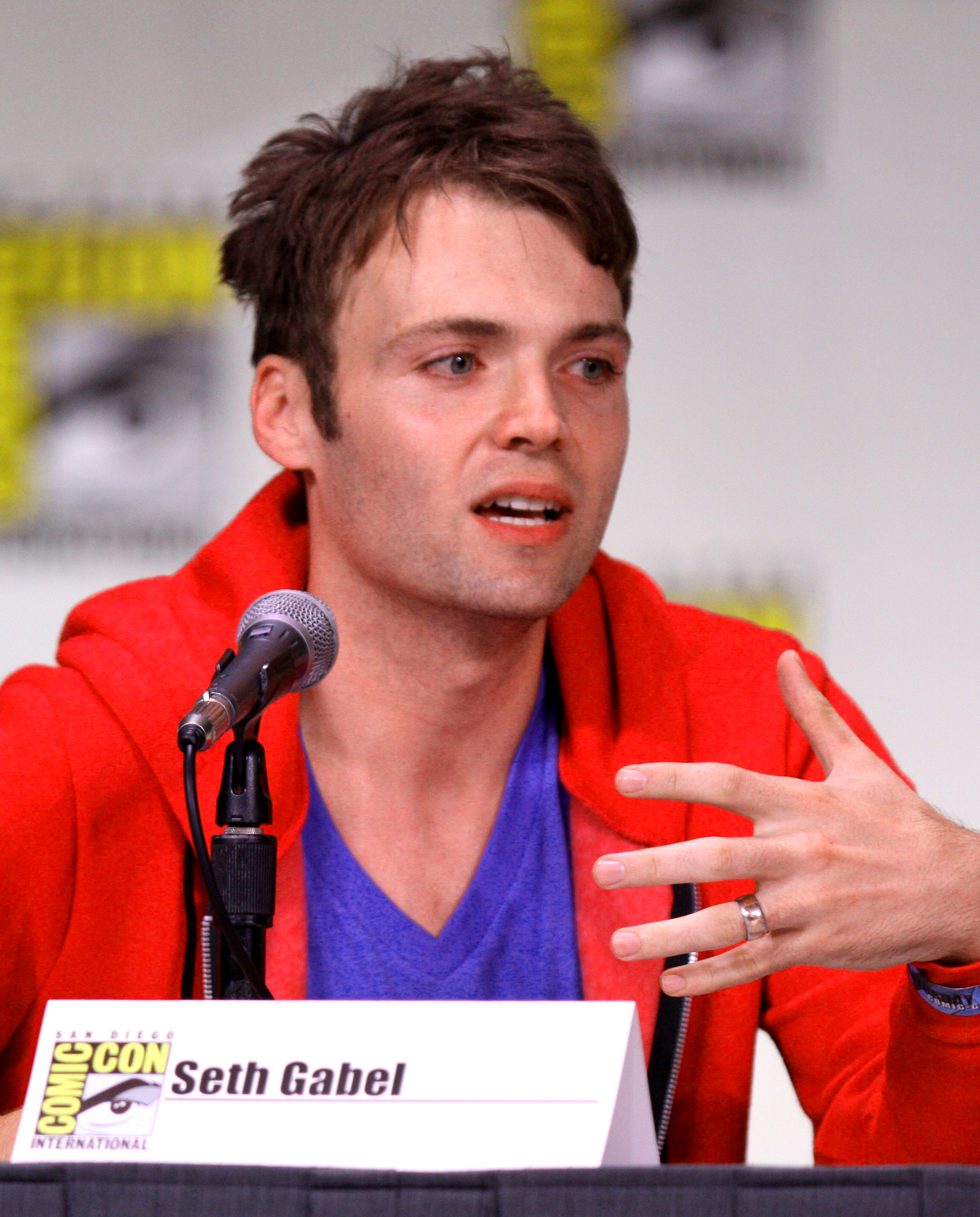
Seth Gabel has been praised for his performance as Lincoln Lee.

Gabel's character is popular among fans of the series. For Gabel's third episode appearance, Jason Hughes of AOL TV called Lincoln "too rich a character to just abandon," a reference to the perception that Lee would be appearing in one (and possibly soon-to-be-ending) universe. Comic Book Resources contributor Josh Wigler wrote that "Gabel’s Lee comes at us without any real shred of history. It’s a testament to his acting that the decreasingly scarred agent is as compelling as he is, given the fact that there are already countless other characters to keep track of and worry about. Lee is a welcome addition to the Fringe cast, and I hope to see him (and Acevedo) stick around for a while."

Numerous writers have praised the relationship between Lincoln Lee and Charlie Francis; Los Angeles Times contributor Andrew Hanson noted after the season three episode "Bloodline", "The Lincoln/Charlie relationship might be one of my favorites on the show. Those two guys seem so natural and fun together."

In the fourth season premiere – his first episode as a series regular – Jeff Jensen of Entertainment Weekly believed Gabel "made an instant, positive impression -- on us, and on the team. Maybe that Peter-shaped void won't be so hard to fill after all." In April 2012, SFX ranked the character among the twenty things they love about the series, explaining that "Fringe has a way of subtly sneaking characters under your nose until you suddenly realise you adore them. Nowhere is this more evident than with Seth Gabel’s Lincoln Lee."
