= Graham Roland =

Native American writer and producer

- Born: Ardmore, Oklahoma, U.S.
- Citizenship: Chickasaw Nation; American
- Occupations: Writer, producer
- Years active: 2008–present
- Military career
- Allegiance: United States
- Branch: United States Marine Corps
- Service years: 2000–2006
- Conflicts: Iraq War

Graham Roland is a Native American writer and producer. He is best known for creating the AMC crime thriller series Dark Winds.

== Career ==
Roland is known for his work as a writer on the FOX series Prison Break and on the final season of the ABC mystery series Lost. He also worked as a writer and co-producer on Fringe.

He served as a writer and co-producer on the FOX crime/science fiction series Almost Human until it was cancelled on April 29, 2014. In 2015, he wrote two episodes of the United States remake of The Returned and has produced all 10-episodes of the first season. He wrote the story and executive produced the Mark Wahlberg espionage action thriller Mile 22, directed by Peter Berg. He also worked on the action political thriller web television series Jack Ryan, based on characters from the fictional "Ryanverse" created by Tom Clancy. He co-created it with Carlton Cuse.

== Personal life ==
He is also an Iraq War veteran who served in the United States Marine Corps from 2000 to 2006. He is of Native American heritage. Roland is a Chickasaw Nation citizen.

== Filmography ==
Film

Year	Title	Writer	Executive Producer
2018	Mile 22	Story	Yes
2026	Jack Ryan: Ghost War	No	Yes

Television

Year	Title	Writer	Producer	Creator	Notes
2008	Prison Break	Yes	No	No	Wrote 2 episodes
2010	Lost	Yes	No	No	Wrote 3 episodes, also story editor
2010	The New Man in Charge	Yes	No	No	Epilogue of Lost
2010–13	Fringe	Yes	Yes	No	Wrote 13 episodes Also co-producer and supervising producer
2013–14	Almost Human	Yes	Co-executive	No	Wrote 2 episodes
2015	The Returned	Yes	Co-executive	No	Wrote 2 episodes
2018–23	Jack Ryan	Yes	Executive	Yes	Showrunner; wrote 9 episodes
2022–present	Dark Winds	Yes	Executive	Yes	Wrote 2 episodes
2027	Neuromancer	Yes	Executive	Yes	Showrunner; wrote 3 episodes
