= List of Fringe characters =

This article lists the major and recurring fictional characters on the science fiction television series, Fringe, created by J. J. Abrams, Alex Kurtzman, and Roberto Orci.

In the overarching storyline for the five seasons of the show, several versions of the characters are introduced. Beginning in the second season, a parallel universe is revealed; many of the characters, portrayed by the same actors, exist simultaneously in the original and parallel realities. The fourth season is set in an alternate timeline, where original and parallel universes have evolved from different outcome at a certain point in their history, resulting in two more versions of the characters.

These character profiles describe the characters as they appear in the original universe, with universe differences noted separately.

== Cast ==
List indicators
= Main cast (credited)
= Recurring cast (3+)
= Guest cast (1–2)

=== Main cast ===
| Character | Portrayed by | Appearances | | | | |
| Character | Portrayed by | Season 1 | Season 2 | Season 3 | Season 4 | Season 5 |
|---|---|---|---|---|---|---|
| Olivia Dunham | Anna Torv | Main | Main | Main | Main | Main |
| Peter Bishop | Joshua Jackson | Main | Main | Main | Main | Main |
| Phillip Broyles | Lance Reddick | Main | Main | Main | Main | Recurring |
| Charlie Francis | Kirk Acevedo | Main (Note: Kirk Acevedo is credited as a guest star in the second season finale Over There after departing the main cast earlier in the season.) | Main | Recurring | | |
| Nina Sharp | Blair Brown | Main | Main | Main | Main | Recurring |
| Astrid Farnsworth | Jasika Nicole | Main | Main | Main | Main | Main |
| John Scott | Mark Valley | Main | | | | |
| Walter Bishop | John Noble | Main | Main | Main | Main | Main |
| Lincoln Lee | Seth Gabel | | Guest | Recurring | Main | Guest |

=== Recurring cast ===
| Character | Portrayed by | Appearances | | | | |
| Character | Portrayed by | Season 1 | Season 2 | Season 3 | Season 4 | Season 5 |
|---|---|---|---|---|---|---|
| September | Michael Cerveris | Recurring | Recurring | Recurring | Recurring | Recurring |
| Rodriguez | Ash Roeca | Recurring | | | | |
| David Robert Jones | Jared Harris | Recurring | | | Recurring | |
| Mitchell Loeb | Chance Kelly | Recurring | | | | |
| Sanford Harris | Michael Gaston | Recurring | | | | |
| Rachel Dunham | Ari Graynor | Recurring | Recurring | | | |
| Ella Blake | Lily Pilblad (Note: Emily Meade portrayed a future version of the character in the third season episode The Day We Died.) | Recurring | Recurring | Guest | | |
| Store Owner | Stefan Arngrim | | Recurring | Guest | | |
| Sam Weiss | Kevin Corrigan | | Recurring | Recurring | | |
| Thomas Jerome Newton | Sebastian Roché | | Recurring | Guest | | |
| William Bell | Leonard Nimoy | Guest | Recurring | Guest | Recurring | |
| Brandon Fayette | Ryan McDonald | | Recurring | Recurring | Guest | |
| December | Eugene Lipinski | | Recurring | Guest | Recurring | Guest |
| Marilyn Dunham | Amy Madigan (Note: Ania Markiewicz portrayed a younger version of the character in the third season episode Lysergic Acid Diethylamide.) | | | Recurring | | |
| Henry Arliss Higgins | Andre Royo | | | Recurring | | |
| Frank Stanton | Philip Winchester | | Guest | Recurring | | |
| Nadine Park | Michelle Krusiec | | | | Recurring | |
| Tim | Jarod Joseph | | | Guest | Recurring | |
| Henrietta Bishop | Georgina Haig (Note: Abagayle Hardwick portrayed the character as a child.) | | | | Guest | Recurring |
| Captain Windmark | Michael Kopsa | | | | Guest | Recurring |
| Anil | Shaun Smyth | | | | | Recurring |
| Mueller | Michael Rogers | | | | | Recurring |
| Michael | Rowan Longworth (Note: Spencer List portrayed the character in the first season episode Inner Child.) | Guest | | | | Recurring |

== Primary characters ==
=== Olivia Dunham ===
Olivia Dunham (portrayed by Anna Torv as an adult and Ada Berker and Karley Scott Collins as a young girl; main: season 1–5) is a young FBI agent assigned to a multi-agency task force of the U.S. Department of Homeland Security called the "Fringe division". She is brought aboard the Fringe division after her boyfriend and fellow agent, John Scott, dies in a Fringe-related case. As the series progresses she comes to learn that, as a child, she was a test subject for Walter's Cortexiphan trials, giving her some uneven psycho-kinetic abilities including the ability to cross between the universes. Over the course of the show Olivia develops a romantic relationship with Peter.

The Other Universe version of Olivia Dunham, dubbed by the prime universe as Fauxlivia, is an agent of the alternate and more powerful Fringe division. As of the end of season 2, Fauxlivia is sent to the prime universe by Walternate, taking Olivia's place without the knowledge of the Bishops, and maintains a close relationship with Peter for unknown reasons; this ultimately puts stress on Olivia and Peter's own relationship. Eventually, she is brought back to the parallel world after completing her mission in the prime one. Fauxlivia has also been nicknamed, unofficially, Altivia, Alt-Olivia, Otherlivia, and Bolivia. In the episode "Immortality," Fauxlivia is revealed to be pregnant with Peter Bishop's child, which Walternate hopes to use to sway Peter back to the Other Universe. The alternate Olivia gives birth to a son in the episode "Bloodline". In the episode "6:02 AM EST" it is revealed that she has named the baby Henry. Walternate uses a sample of the baby's blood to activate the machine to destroy the other universe.

For several episodes, Torv also played a third role, that of Olivia possessed by the mind of William Bell, which has been dubbed "Bellivia" by reviewers. In this, she simulates Nimoy's raspy voice and mannerisms used in the portrayal of Bell.

=== Peter Bishop ===
Peter Bishop (portrayed by Joshua Jackson as an adult, and Quinn Lord, Nico Ghisi and Chandler Canterbury as young boy; main: season 1–5) is the son of mad scientist Walter Bishop, and a member of the Fringe division. In the show's second season it is revealed that Peter is actually from a parallel universe from where he had been kidnapped by Walter after this universe's version of Peter died at a young age. He is a genius with an I.Q. of 190, a college drop-out with gambling debts, and a jack-of-all-trades. In the second season two-part finale "Over There", and a major plot element of the third season, Peter is found to be the only person that can cause a reaction from an apparent doomsday device that Walternate has assembled in the parallel universe and that is currently being assembled in the prime world.

=== Walter Bishop ===
Walter Bishop (portrayed by John Noble; main: season 1–5) is a former government researcher into fringe science with a recorded I.Q. of 196. He was institutionalized after a lab accident which resulted in manslaughter charges. Having been locked up for 17 years in a mental institute prior to becoming assigned to the Fringe division, Walter often expresses wonder at modern technology, and seems to be disconnected from the world, sometimes leaving his son to decode his rantings for others. He often says things which seem so obvious that no one else wants to say (or thinks necessary) and tends to burst into song while working, as he believes it helps him think. He is also known to eat or drink while working on a body, no matter how disgusting everyone else thinks it is. He seems to derive joy from both these quirks. He is the archetypal mad scientist.

The Other Universe version of Walter Bishop, nicknamed Walternate, is the United States Secretary of Defense, and directly oversees the alternate and more powerful Fringe division. He is the main antagonist of the third season. Walternate also serves as the immediate superior to the shapeshifters, with their leader—Thomas Jerome Newton—being extremely loyal and protective of him (possibly being friends). Walternate, making arrangements through Newton and other shapeshifters, successfully traveled to the prime universe, and was later brought to see Peter for the first time since he was taken by his counterpart. Walternate convinces Peter to return home to the Other Universe, though he later goes back, though not before Walternate appears to have Olivia replaced by her own counterpart, as part of an unknown plan regarding Peter.

Alternate timeline: Original Walter appears more nervous and insecure, and doesn't leave his lab for years on end. He is still under supervision of psychiatrist Bruce Sumner, the director of St. Claire's Hospital, where he had been institutionalized. He was released from hospital under Olivia's care.

== Secondary characters ==
=== Astrid Farnsworth ===
Astrid Farnsworth (portrayed by Jasika Nicole; main: season 1–5) is an FBI Junior Agent who serves as Olivia's assistant. She is stationed in the lab with Walter, who can never remember her name (e.g. calling her "Asterix", "Aspirin", "Asteroid", "Astro", "Ostrich", "Aphid", "Esther", "Ashram", "Alex", "Afro", "Astrif", "Agnes", "Asner", etc.). In the 4th episode of season 4, "Subject 9", Walter calls out to Astrid by uttering "Claire!". Astrid, who normally brushes off these idiosyncrasies, however, this time she asked Walter: "Really?!? Claire?!? That doesn't even start with an "A"!" Though her work is mostly clerical, she has a number of skills which come in handy during their cases, such as cryptanalysis and proficiency in Latin. Despite being a main character for four years, Astrid's personal life and past were never examined in depth.

The parallel universe version of Astrid Farnsworth is an autistic savant serving as a computer and statistics specialist in the Fringe division.

Alternate timeline: The original Astrid is a field agent, examining crime scenes and collecting information with the rest of the team, which she relays back to Walter in real time via a videophone device worn on her right ear. She also continues to support Walter in the lab.

In the episode "Making Angels", the two Astrids finally meet, when alternate universe Astrid gives herself security clearance to cross over after the death of her father, to seek condolences and closure from her primary universe counterpart. It is in this same episode that we are offered a peek into the home lives of the two Astrids and why they might be so different. We learn that while both Astrids' mothers died when they were young, and they were both raised by their fathers, that alternate universe Astrid felt a sense of rejection and disapproval from her father, while the Astrid in the primary universe had a warm, loving father, whom she was close to (though she lies about this in an attempt to console her counterpart). However it is ambiguous as to whether this is a cause or effect, as alternate universe Astrid seemed to be under the impression that her father was distant due to the way she was, not that she was the way she was because he was distant, while we know nothing of how the primary universe Astrid may have been as a child.

=== Phillip Broyles ===
Phillip Broyles (portrayed by Lance Reddick; main: season 1–4; recurring: season 5) is a Homeland Security Special Agent and head of the Fringe division, which was established to investigate a series of terrorist/unexplained phenomena. While Broyles comes off as professional and by-the-book, he is surprisingly flexible when it comes to dealing with the unusual circumstances of Pattern-related cases. Little is known of Broyles' past. He has been involved in the military, citing experience as a colonel in "six wars". Broyles was once married to Diane and had children, but his obsession with a case broke up his marriage. He initially harbors resentment for Olivia as she was responsible for prosecuting his friend Sanford Harris, but comes to respect Olivia's aptitude and later defends her against Harris. He knows President Obama, who he thinks dislikes him because Broyles beat him at golf.

In the parallel universe, Colonel Broyles is in charge of the alternate Fringe division and answers directly to Secretary Bishop. He is still married to Diane, and lives together with her and their two children, Christopher—who suffers both physical and psychological trauma following being kidnapped—and a daughter. In the third-season episode "Entrada", Colonel Broyles sacrifices himself to give time for Olivia to escape the parallel universe. His body is later mutilated and sent to the Prime Universe as a substitution of mass so that Fauxlivia may return home. Agent Broyles later examines his body and closes his eyes out of respect. Olivia makes it clear that she intends to find a solution to the conflict between the two universes without one being destroyed, as she promised Colonel Broyles she would.

Alternate timeline: Still alive, Colonel Broyles is in charge of Fringe Division. A now-living David Robert Jones has, however, tempted him into an alliance. This is later revealed to be because his son is dying, and David Robert Jones is providing medicine to save him in return for Broyles' cooperation. He is instructed to insert a device into the bridge between universes but instead turns himself in to prime-universe Broyles.

In season 5, Broyles is "The Dove" for the resistance feeding intel to the underground. He is exposed as The Dove and interrogated; but he is saved by Peter and Olivia in the series finale.

=== Nina Sharp ===
Nina Sharp (portrayed by Blair Brown; main: season 1–4; recurring: season 5) is the executive director of Massive Dynamic, and has run the business since William Bell's departure to the parallel world. Nina has had long personal ties with Walter and romantic interactions with William. One of her forearms is a highly advanced prosthetic arm. Nina lost her arm while trying to prevent Walter from crossing over to the parallel universe in 1985. The cover story she uses to explain the prosthetic replacement of her arm is that she lost it to cancer. Nina is often cryptic and cautious of interacting with the Fringe members; though she will provide Massive Dynamic's services when necessary, she does not always reveal the full truth of the situation. Nina is able to communicate to William; in the season 1 finale, she arranged for Olivia to be taken to the parallel universe to meet him, while in the season 2 finale, she alerted William to the plan to rescue Peter. After Bell's death, Walter is left in control of Massive Dynamic, but chooses to leave the majority of the control day-to-day workings of the company with Nina. She later becomes his confidant during his despair at having possibly caused the universe to unravel.

Alternate timeline: Nina's backstory is altered. She adopted Olivia, and her sister Rachel, after their mother died and Olivia killed their stepfather, and consequently she and Olivia share a much closer relationship. The Nina from the parallel universe is seen to be conspiring with a revived David Robert Jones.

In season 5 and the future of 2036, Nina Sharp is the director of Ministry of Science and appeared to cooperate with the Observers. But in secret she was allied with the resistance and helped the Fringe team. In "Anomaly XB-6783746", her allegiance was exposed and she was caught by Captain Windmark. To protect the plan, she killed herself.

=== John Scott ===
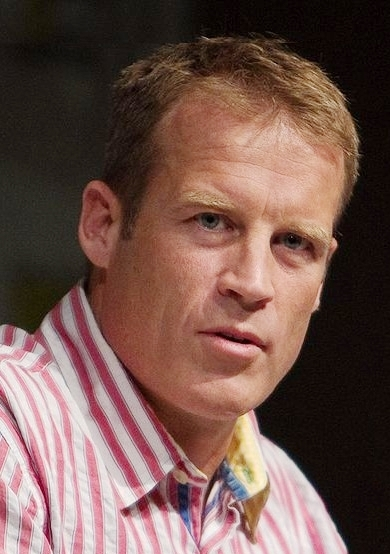
Mark Valley plays John Scott

John Scott (portrayed by Mark Valley; main: season 1) is an FBI Special Agent who, in the pilot episode, is Olivia's partner and lover. During an investigation of a flesh-dissolving toxin, John is exposed to the toxin after the lab producing it explodes with him nearby. He is placed in a medically induced coma, and during this time Walter devises a procedure to link his mind to Olivia's in order to gain information about the suspect who caused the explosion. With that information, they locate the suspect, from whom they gain the necessary understanding of the chemical to cure John. Shortly thereafter, it is discovered that John himself financed the creation of the toxin. This connection ties him to "the Pattern", the incidents investigated by the Fringe Division, making him a suspected terrorist. A subsequent high-speed chase results in John's death, leaving Olivia to question not only John's true loyalty, but also his love for her.

Following his death, John's corpse is secretly delivered to Massive Dynamic, to serve as an information gathering source.

As a result of their mental link, part of John's consciousness is transferred to Olivia, allowing her to communicate with him through hallucinations and dreams. Her mind begins integrating and purging his consciousness, resulting in her mistaking his memories for her own. He also continually tells her that he loves her "always", and intends to prove it to her. While following his "ghost" she discovers a hideout of his where he seemed to be conducting an independent investigation into the "pattern". She also finds an engagement ring with the word "always" written inside, suggesting John was intending to propose to her, which she takes as a personal keepsake.

Before his consciousness disappears completely, Olivia learns that John was working undercover for the NSA, infiltrating ZFT, by now known to be the organization responsible behind "the Pattern", and that whatever relationship the two of them had was real. Admitting her love for him, Olivia says her goodbyes to John before he fades away forever. Olivia later tells Broyles that even though John is still considered a traitor by the FBI, she knows in her heart that he was a hero.

In the alternate timeline created by Peter Bishop's erasure, many of the events of John's life remain the same. He is still the partner of Olivia and still affected by the toxin. However, while Olivia is able to get Walter out his mental hospital to help him, John dies before a cure can be found. His death profoundly affects Olivia, leaving her even more isolated and cold than in the previous timeline. It is also suggested that the toxin which killed him may have been a disastrous attempt by ZFT to create human shape-shifters, although this is unconfirmed.

=== Charlie Francis ===
Charles "Charlie" Francis (portrayed by Kirk Acevedo; main: season 1–2; recurring: season 3) is an FBI Special Agent, who holds the position of a supervisor. He is close friends with John Scott and Olivia. Olivia often comes to him with requests for manpower and other resources. Charlie is later promoted to Second-In-Command of the Fringe division, making him the immediate subordinate of Broyles. In the season premiere of season 2, Charlie is killed by a shapeshifter who takes his place and burns his body in a hospital furnace. The shapeshifter maintains his identity for some time until it learns the location of Newton, after which Olivia is forced to kill it. Charlie's death weighs heavily on Olivia's conscience. She later receives a post-mortem message from him in the form of a series of seemingly random letters that arrange to form the first sentence Charlie ever told her. "You're gonna be fine."

After original Charlie is killed in 2.01 and the shapeshifter is killed in 2.04, Charlie appears frequently in a special episode that airs between 2.10 and 2.11, a seeming continuity error that can be explained out-of-universe, as the episode was originally filmed with season 1 but was not released until January mid-season 2.

The parallel universe version of Charlie Francis is alive and an agent of the alternate and more powerful Fringe division. The alternative Charlie ("alt-Charlie") shares many of the same traits as the prime version, although he is slightly more crass and has a small scar beneath his left eye. He also suffers from a parasite infestation in his body, a fate averted by the prime universe's Charlie in the first-season episode "Unleashed".

=== Lincoln Lee ===
Captain Lincoln Lee (portrayed by Seth Gabel; main: season 4; recurring: season 2–3, 5) is a team leader within the parallel universe Fringe division, working with Fauxlivia and Alt-Charlie.

Agent Lee was originally introduced in the first part of the season two finale, when the Fringe division of the prime universe goes to "the other side" to get Peter back. The showdown between the two Fringe divisions leaves Lee with third degree burns covering 90% of his body. Thanks to the advanced nanotechnology known in the other dimension, Lee does not stay away from duty for long, and after a three months medical treatment he is completely recovered.

Lee is a capable agent and a devoted friend to his fellow Fringe division agents, risking his health by prematurely leaving his nano-regeneration chamber to help them. Lee seems to care deeply for Fauxlivia and even attempted kissing her before learning she had a boyfriend. He seems to be very bad at keeping secrets, as he immediately tells Fauxlivia that her fiancé intends to propose to her after having been told in confidence. He is in charge of the Fringe division after the death of the alternate Colonel Broyles. At first he seems to doubt himself, saying that he "feels like he's missing something, that Broyles would see something he wouldn't" ("Immortality") but he gains more confidence after apprehending the culprit.

The alternate timeline Lincoln Lee of the prime universe is an FBI Special Agent, and is distinguished by his use of eyeglasses and generally more clean cut appearance than his parallel universe counterpart. In the episode "Everything in Its Right Place", the prime and parallel versions of Lincoln Lee both grew up in Teaneck, New Jersey until their moms died and then their dads moved them to Philadelphia, both fathers started an Ace Hardware, they both attended Hamilton High School, both had Mr. Glasberg as their 10th grade science teacher, they both graduated with a 3.85 GPA and both slacked off in their senior years to work at their dads' stores, and they both didn't go to prom because they both had just broken up with Alicia Dvoskin. Despite identical life experiences, at some point their lives bifurcated in opposite directions with the prime Lincoln Lee lacking confidence and the parallel Lincoln Lee being quite confident. The parallel Lincoln Lee theorized that it was because he made a conscious choice to become that confident man. He's from Hartford, Connecticut. Agent Broyles originally introduces him to the Fringe Division in order to consult on the case of a seemingly immortal woman, to which he had been assigned after her family was gruesomely murdered. He is at first confused by the bizarre antics of the agents and the seemingly impossible situations they investigate, but he seems to quickly take it in stride, becoming enthusiastic about the work and offering them his help whenever they need it. This version of Agent Lee has also developed some romantic feelings towards Olivia, but does not fully act upon them due to the complications caused by the return of Peter. His alternate universe counterpart is killed in a shootout during Season 4, and prime universe Agent Lee stays in the alternate universe both to investigate David Robert Jones and because he feels less of a third wheel than with prime Olivia and Peter. Later, in Season 5, Agent Lee is shown to be married to Fauxlivia as they run Fringe division in the Other Universe.

Seth Gabel was upgraded to the main cast with the start of Season 4. However, he did not return as a main cast member in season 5.

== Recurring characters ==
=== Ella Blake ===
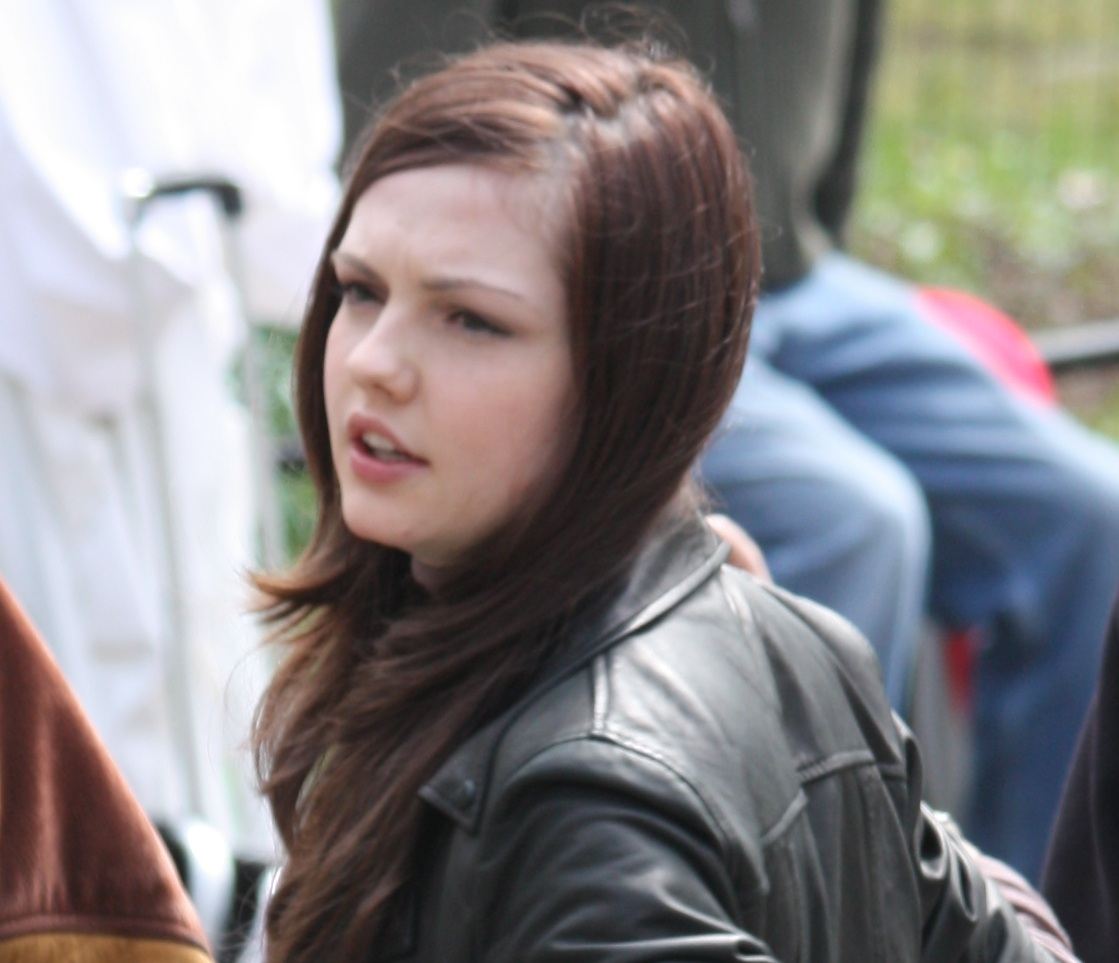
Emily Meade portrayed Future Ella, known as Ella Dunham

Ella Blake (later Dunham in a possible 2026 reality) is the young niece of Olivia Dunham. The role was primarily played by child actress Lily Pilblad. A futuristic 22-year-old version of the character was portrayed by actress Emily Meade in the third season finale, "The Day We Died". She appears in the first three seasons, and is only mentioned briefly in the fourth season.

In her original form, Ella and her mother Rachel, Olivia's sister come to visit and stay in Olivia's Boston apartment after the breakdown of Rachel's marriage. During her stay, she plays on a laptop computer while her mother Rachel is busy in the kitchen. She downloads a program that intends to liquify her brain, but is saved after Olivia and Peter race to the apartment and thwart the murder attempt. She enjoys the friendship that Peter offers her. Rachel considers moving Ella into a local school in Boston where a boy named Graham goes to.

The Observers later watch Ella and Olivia enjoy time on a rollercoaster ride together. December states how hard things are going to be for her, without it being clear whether this is Ella or Olivia. In "Brown Betty", she goes with Olivia to the Harvard Lab, where Astrid and Walter babysit her. Walter tells her a fairy tale while he is high on his own concoction of drugs, which he titled "Brown Betty". She insists on a happy ending as opposed to his unhappy one. In "Over There", Olivia gives her a necklace that had belonged to Olivia's mother. Ella shares the gifting with Rachel, raising concern about Olivia's return.

The season three episode "Amber 31422" states Ella and her mother moved back to Chicago off-screen. Olivia reminds herself of this through Peter's hallucination. During her sensory-deprivation experimentations, she manages to reach the prime universe to contact Ella on her seventh birthday (suggesting she is born in 2003). Ella is heard expressing excitement over Olivia not forgetting her birthday. This allows Olivia to become lucid to her life in the prime universe after being brainwashed.

In the future of May 2026, Ella was promoted and became an agent of Fringe Division as the prime universe was dying. Her aunt Olivia became her guardian, following the implied demise of her parents. Her aunt is murdered however by her father-in-law, Walternate. At Olivia's viking funeral, Ella accepts the flag for her family. Her aunt's death leaves Ella cynical, as Walter attempts to get her to recollect her experiences as a young child in the lab. Soon after, Peter explains she was one of the First People who sent the Vacuum back in time to cause a paradox that prevents the destruction of their world and save Olivia's life.

In the fourth season's new timeline, it is revealed she has a younger brother, Eddie. Her parents were also never separated in this new reality. This was addressed as a cause for concern during Olivia's psych evaluation after regaining her memories from the previous timeline.

=== Henrietta "Etta" Bishop ===
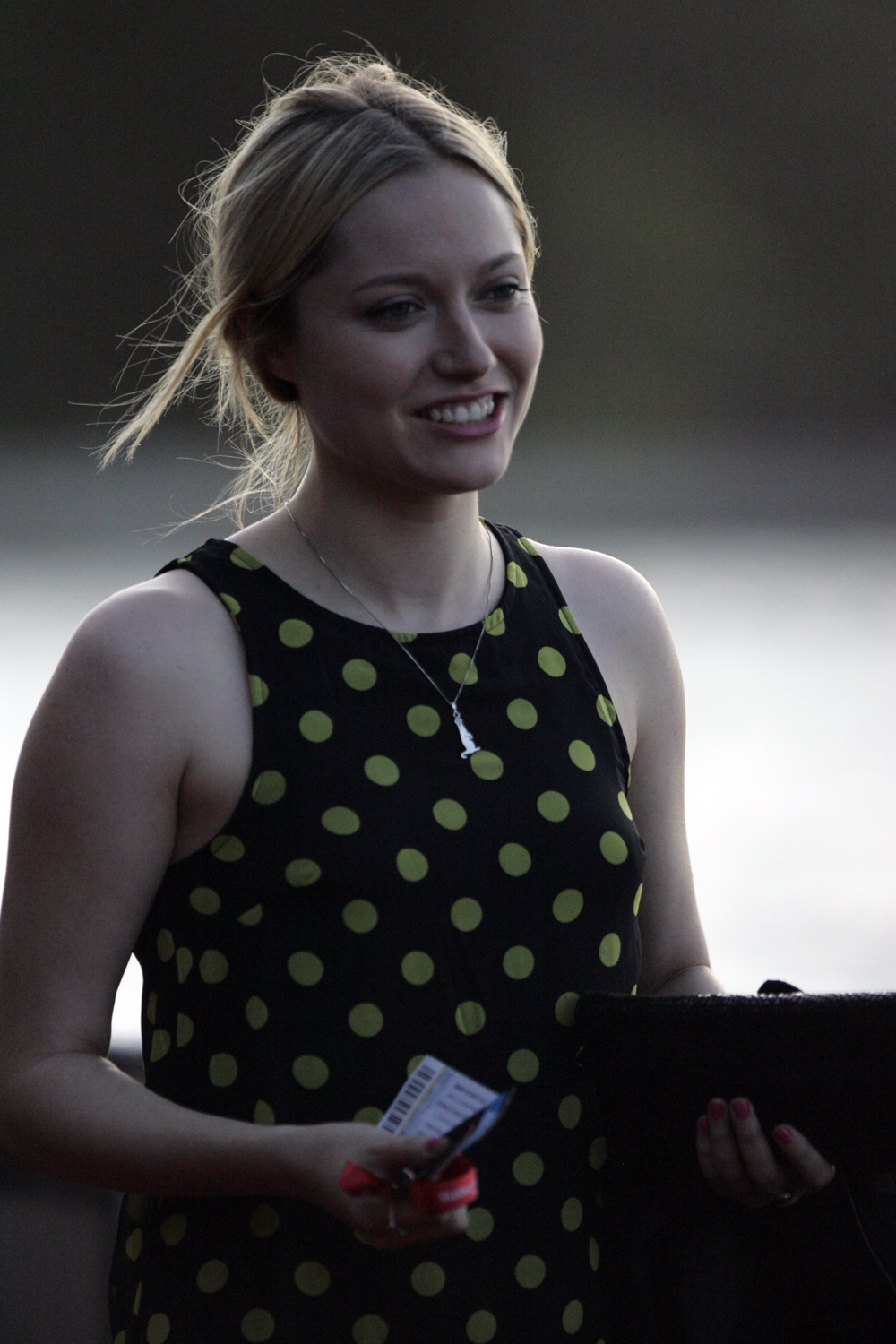
Georgina Haig portrayed Etta Bishop

Henrietta "Etta" Bishop (portrayed by Georgina Haig) is a government agent in the year 2036, and is the daughter of Peter Bishop and Olivia Dunham.

Bishop first appeared in the fourth season installment "Letters of Transit". She is a part of a small resistance group opposing world control by hostile Observers from the 2600s who traveled back in time to take over in 2015. Bishop is convinced the original Fringe team survived the seize and are still alive. She, and her partner Simon Foster (Henry Ian Cusick), eventually locate the team (except for Olivia Dunham) frozen in amber and free them. Peter Bishop comes to the emotional realization that Henrietta is his daughter. In "The Bullet That Saved the World", Etta is killed by Captain Windmark, but she is saved by the season 5 finale of resetting the time line.

=== Mitchell Loeb ===
Mitchell Loeb (portrayed by Chance Kelly) is an FBI agent, and a member of the bio-terrorist organization ZFT, as led by David Robert Jones.

Loeb originally appears as a loyal FBI agent attacked by a lethal parasite that threatens to slowly kill him. Walter is eventually able to kill the parasite, thanks to the information given by bio-terrorist David Robert Jones. However, it is soon shown that Loeb and his wife are in fact secretly working for Jones.

Putting together Walter's untested teleportation device, stolen from several individual safe-deposit boxes, and using a mathematical equation and a device that allows him to temporarily disrupt the particles in a solid object and pass through them, Loeb is eventually able to teleport Jones out of the prison, freeing him.

With Jones out of the prison, Loeb—still working for the FBI—abducts Olivia on behalf of Jones. Olivia is however able to escape, but begins suspecting that Loeb was the one who kidnapped her. While paying a visit to Loeb's home, looking for anything to support her suspicions, Olivia gets into a gunfight with Loeb's wife Samantha, killing her. When Loeb eventually learns about his wife's death, he confesses his involvement with Jones, and is incarcerated.

=== Sanford Harris ===
Sanford Harris (portrayed by Michael Gaston) was originally a high-ranking officer of the United States Marine Corps. He is a close friend of Phillip Broyles. One evening he got drunk and sexually assaulted three female Marine privates; a crime for which he was exposed and prosecuted by Olivia, resulting in several years of imprisonment. The conviction was later overturned, but Harris' career was ruined. Harris then joined the Department of Homeland Security, rising in rank to become a high-level consultant for the Pentagon. He is called in to audit the procedures of the Fringe Division, and puts a clear emphasis on Olivia's actions. As his position makes him her superior officer, Olivia does her best to humor him. Harris is eventually exposed as a ZFT operative during an investigation of two pyrokinetic women. Olivia tracks Harris during his abduction of the second woman and is locked in a room with her. With her out-of-control powers, it was expected that Olivia would be vaporized when the woman exploded; Olivia instead helps her focus her powers on Harris, who is quickly incinerated.

=== William Bell ===
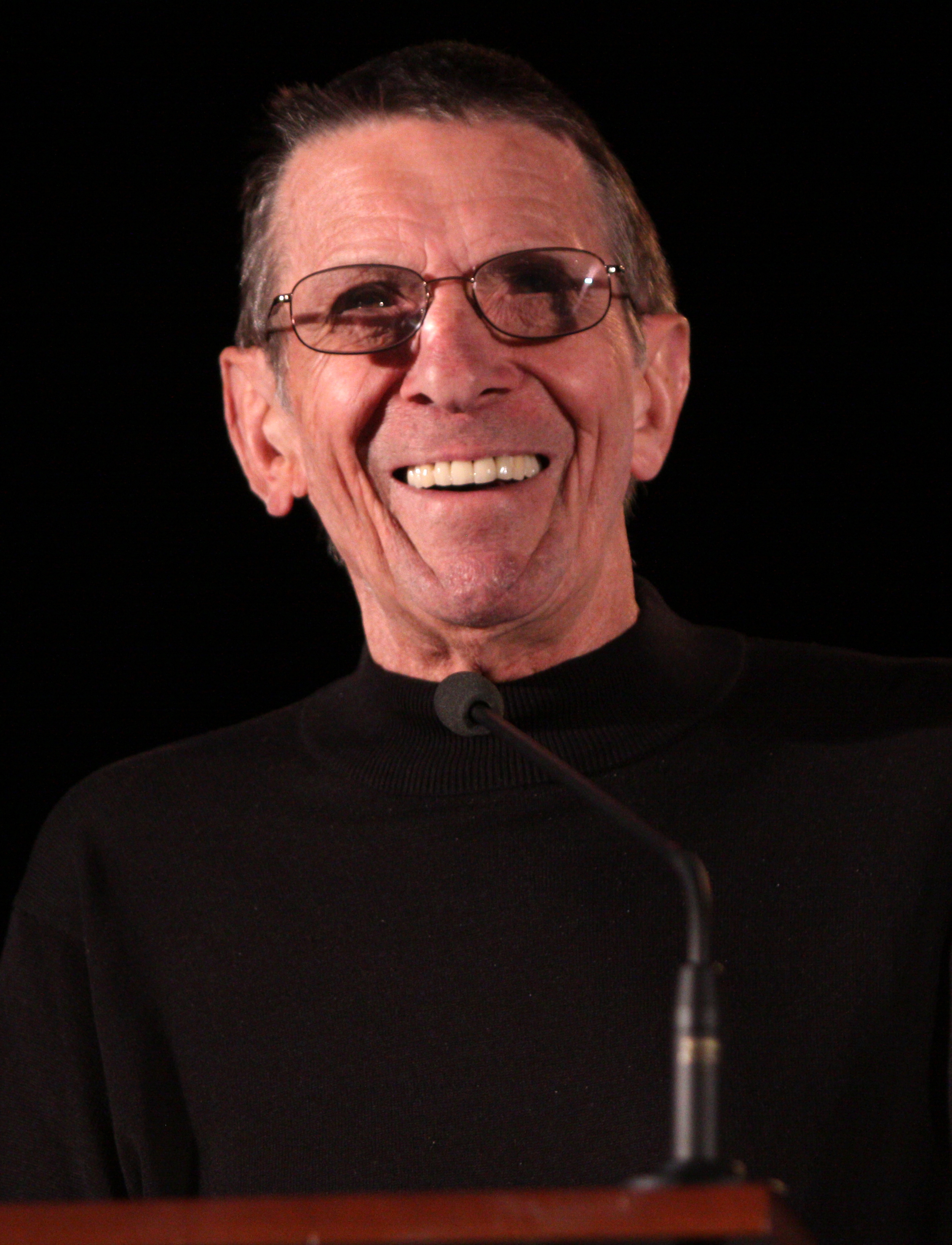
Leonard Nimoy plays William Bell

William Bell (portrayed by Leonard Nimoy) is the founder of Massive Dynamic and the former lab partner and friend of Walter. William is mentioned throughout season one, showing several ties with Walter's past and the study of the parallel dimension, including participating in the Cortexiphan trials. Sometime after Walter brought Peter from the parallel universe, William convinced Walter to allow him to remove pieces of Walter's brain and implant them in other patients to keep the knowledge of dimensional travel safe; this process led to Walter's mental instability and institutionalization. The two parted ways, William going on to form Massive Dynamic.

Sometime after founding Massive Dynamic, William finds a means to travel to the parallel dimension, and sets up an office in the still-standing World Trade Center. Though he travels back and forth several times, William finds his body has become unstable and remains in the parallel dimension, still communicating with Nina whom he left in charge of Massive Dynamic.

During the first season, Walter discovers that William wrote the ZFT manifesto, which is the base for the ZFT members' actions (to prepare for war against the parallel dimension, by doing experiments of all sorts of weapons – chemical, biological, or even human).

In his first screen appearance, William brings Olivia across in the season 1 finale to warn her about the oncoming storm between universes and the identity of the shapeshifter Newton. In the second-season finale, he helps Walter and Olivia to evade capture in the parallel universe, and then assists Walter in preparing equipment for them to return to the prime universe; William and Walter reestablish their friendship when William reminds Walter why he had removed the brain pieces. When Olivia returns with Peter, Bell is unable to cross over again, as his atoms would split apart and no trace of him would remain in either universe. Because of this, he sacrifices himself to provide the means for Walter, Peter, and Olivia (in actuality, the alternative Olivia) to return to the prime universe. With William now dead in both universes, Walter discovers at the start of Season 3 that William left the whole of Massive Dynamic to him in his will.

As explained by William at the end of Season 2, the alternative version of William was killed as a young man in a car accident; as a result, Massive Dynamic in the parallel dimension was never formed, instead there is only Bishop Dynamic.

In season three, Walter remembers that William had an idea of developing "soul magnets", devices that would channel the energy from a dead body into another entity. Walter figures that William must have created a soul magnet for himself and figures that the trigger is the frequency created by the bell William left for Nina. Walter rings it and William's consciousness appears in Olivia. "Bellivia" explains that he put the soul magnets in Olivia's tea when they first met in the other universe. Broyles gives William 48 hours to find a new viable host for him and get out of Olivia's body, but William takes his time as he knows that no harm is coming to Olivia. However, not too long after, Olivia regains control of her body briefly, confused and in a trance before William takes back over. William then explains that there is something more complicated than he expected.

Walter and Peter journey into Olivia's consciousness and find William in order to recover Olivia before she is "lost". After Walter and Peter "die" within her mind, William aids Olivia in escaping until she is able to confront her own fears, enabling her to take back control of her body. William tells Olivia to pass on the message "I knew the dog wouldn't hunt" to Walter. He then departs from Olivia's consciousness. As Olivia wakes up, Astrid and Walter realise that William's plan to transfer his own consciousness into a computer has failed. Olivia relays William's message to Walter, who explains that the message was a phrase William would use in earlier experiments when he knew that they would not be successful, and that his reason for suggesting it was because "William hates goodbyes".

In the fourth season, it is noted by Nina and Walter that Bell is dead, having, in the new timeline, committed suicide in a car accident in 2005 to end his suffering from lymphoma. Disbelieving Nina, Walter returns to St. Claire's Mental Institution and finds the scent of Bell in one of the log books that dated back to when Walter believed he had visited, and continues to assert this claim. After sending David Robert Jones to his demise, he kidnaps Walter, who has deduced that he is alive, and takes him onto his container ship to sail to his new universe. After Peter and Olivia rescue Walter, Bell rings his ship's bell and disappears. Broyles later notes that he was never found.

William returns in the future, trapped in amber with the Fringe team in 2036. Walter cuts off his hand and tells Astrid to not tell anyone, until in Five-Twenty-Ten, he used it to unlock a storage facility and retrieve part of the plan.

=== Brandon Fayette ===
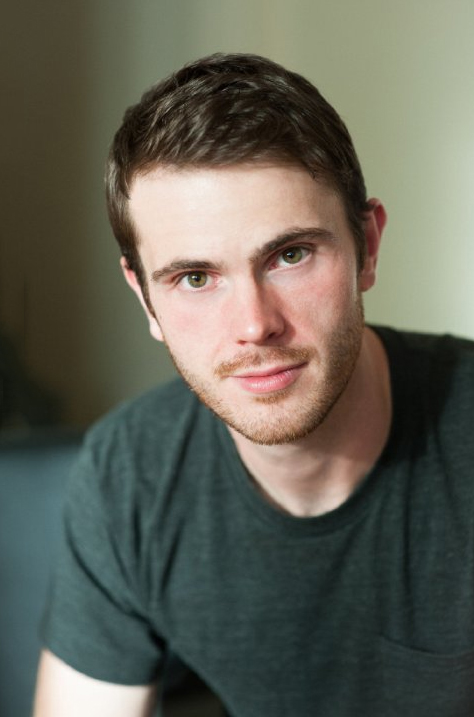
Ryan McDonald plays Brandon Fayette

Brandon Fayette (portrayed by Ryan McDonald) is the leading scientist at Massive Dynamic, offering assistance to the Fringe team on multiple occasions.

The Other Universe version of Brandon is the chief scientist of the Fringe division, often answering directly to Secretary Bishop, and responsible for the assimilation of Olivia into Fauxlivia. Walternate deduced that he became a shapeshifter and killed him.

=== David Robert Jones ===
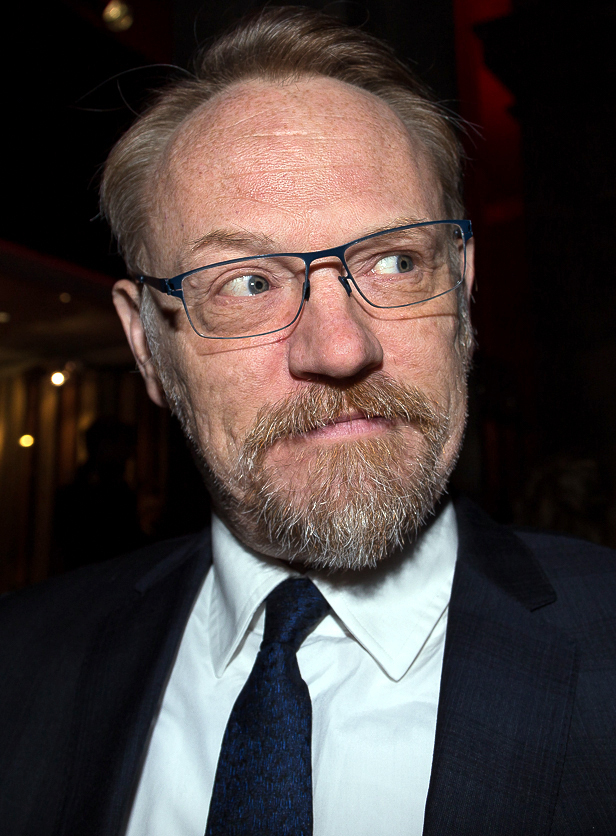
Jared Harris played David Robert Jones

David Robert Jones (portrayed by Jared Harris) is a biochemist and former employee of William Bell and Massive Dynamic, a connection that wasn't revealed until the season one finale. Over the course of the first season, he is also proven to be the leader of ZFT, the organization responsible for most incidents investigated by the Fringe Division during season one.

First appearing in the series while incarcerated in a German prison in the episode "In Which We Meet Mr. Jones", Jones soon becomes the main antagonist of season 1. He is first shown whilst being contacted by Olivia, who is trying to find the antidote for a parasite in Agent Loeb's body. Jones agrees to help her, but only in exchange for the opportunity to ask an associate one question. The response is a coded message picked up by Loeb, who is secretly working for Jones.

Receiving Jones' message, Loeb is soon able to proceed in creating a teleportation device once designed by Walter Bishop, and successfully teleports Jones out of prison, freeing him.

In "Ability" Jones turns himself over to the FBI, in exchange for Walter's help with the life-threatening side-effects of his teleportation. He then presents Olivia with a test: to prevent a biological bomb from detonating by turning off a series of lights only using her mind. Eventually, Olivia is able to do this, thanks to Walter's and Bell's Cortexiphan experiments conducted on her when she was a child. Jones then disappears again, leaving only a cryptic message: "You Passed".

In the Season 1 finale, Jones' former relationship to William Bell is revealed, as is his goal of trying to escape to the parallel universe to confront Bell, who Jones believes never saw his true potential. Everything done by Jones since his introduction in the series has been either to get in contact with Bell, or to prove himself worthy of Bell's approval.

He finally succeeds in opening a portal to the parallel universe, where Bell is located. However, the portal is dangerously unstable, threatening to cause severe harm to both universes. Peter is able to close the portal in time for it not to result in any real disaster. Jones, being only halfway through the portal, is cut in half and dies immediately.

In the Season 4 episode "Back to Where You've Never Been", David Robert Jones returns as a character in the alternate timeline created by Peter Bishop's deletion at the end of Season 3. With Peter's removal, Jones appears to have survived the portal crossing and is present in the alternate universe. He is revealed to be behind the "Human Shapeshifters" that are plaguing both universes and the alternate Broyles and Brandon appear to be under his control. At the end of season 4, he is electrocuted, causing him to disintegrate as an added effect of his earlier use of the teleportation device.

David Robert Jones is the birth name of David Bowie, who played a character named Thomas Jerome Newton in The Man Who Fell to Earth.

=== September (The Observer) ===
September (portrayed by Michael Cerveris), often referred to as The Observer, is a mysterious figure seen at the scene of many Pattern-related events. Like other Observers that have appeared on the show, September is only seen wearing a plain black suit and black fedora, and is pale, bald, and lacks eyebrows. They exhibit several strange mannerisms such as awkward phrasing when talking, a preference for extremely flavored, like spicy or salty foods due to an extremely dulled sense of taste, and the ability to appear or disappear when one looks away. They also use an alien written language with which they maintain copious documentation in small notebooks. Though the Fringe division is aware of the Observers, their intent is not yet known, though believed to be related to the Machine and the conflict between the two universes. They possess uniquely advanced technology, and appear to be temporally aware of time, including the ability to travel in time and between the two universes; the Fringe division finds evidence of Observers at several historical events but looking the same as they do in the present. Like September, the other Observers appear to be named after months, including "August" and "December". The episode "Inner Child" introduces the Fringe division to a child that appears to possess many Observer-like qualities.

In the episode "Peter", September is a catalyst in Walter's abduction of Peter from the parallel universe; September arrived wanting to see the creation of the cure by Walternate that would have saved Peter, but instead distracted Walternate from witnessing a critical test result. When September saw Walter watching through the window-like device, he informed his fellow Observers that he could correct the situation; later, after Walter returned with young Peter to the prime universe and fell through the frozen lake's ice, September rescued them from the freezing water and told Walter, "The child must live".

September and the other Observers have since monitored Walter and Peter. In the second season's finale, September is responsible for alerting the Fringe division to the dangers of Peter being taken back by Walternate to the parallel universe, ultimately leading to their rescue attempt. In the third-season episode "The Firefly", September conducts a convoluted experiment to test Walter's resolve to give up Peter for the greater good when the time comes.

In the third-season finale, episode "The Day We Died", a gathering of ten Observers appeared on Liberty Island to watch and comment on the disappearance of Peter Bishop from existence.

Later, he is ordered by his superior to ensure that Peter's status as nonexistent continues, and constructs a device to erase all lingering memories of Peter from Walter. However, at the last moment, he disobeys his orders and deactivates the device, allowing brief apparitions of Peter to appear to Walter and Olivia.

In "Novation" Peter mysteriously appears in the new timeline. After being taken into custody by the Fringe Division, he learns that the point of divergence in the timeline is that September never saved him from drowning in Reiden Lake when Walter brought him over from the alternate universe. He also learns that, in the new timeline, the Fringe Division is unaware of the existence of the Observers.

September later appears to Olivia while she waits for Peter and Lincoln to return from the alternate universe. Mysteriously wounded from a gunshot to the chest, he warns Olivia that he has seen all of the possible timelines, and the result is always the same: Olivia has to die. He then disappears before Olivia can call an ambulance to help him.

He resurfaces several episodes later in "The End of All Things", during Peter and Walter's search for the kidnapped Olivia, where he appears in Walter's lab, and is dying from the gunshot wound. In an attempt to discover the location of Olivia, Peter enters September's mind using the same method Olivia used to enter John's in the pilot. September has no information on Olivia, but does tell Peter that the Observers come from the future to observe their beginnings, and explains that he has interfered in the past. It is explained that this was an attempt to correct the timeline after accidentally preventing Walternate from discovering the cure to save Peter, thus beginning a chain of events that led to the war between the two universes. He also cryptically says, "they are coming". Before Peter can ask who, September tells Peter to "go home" and yanks him out of his mind. In the real world, September disappears from the lab, having been taken by the others.

In the next episode it is revealed that he planted a message in the form of a black dot in Peter's eye which contains an address in New York. Peter goes to the address to discover Observer technology in an apartment and a cylinder like the one in "The Arrival" which teleports a fully healed September to the apartment. Peter begs September to send him back to the original timeline but September assures him that this is where he is meant to be before teleporting away.

In the 5th season episodes "Anomaly XB-6783746" and "The Boy Must Live", it is revealed that after the events of the fourth season, the Observers removed September's observer technology and conducted "biological reversion" experiments on him, causing him to transform into a human. As a human, he assumed the name Donald O'Connor.

An Observer (either September or a different unnamed Observer) appeared in every episode of Fringe, albeit sometimes only as a brief cameo. As a tie-in with the show, actors playing Observers appeared in the audience of other FOX network shows, including American Idol and the 2009 Major League Baseball All-Star Game.

In creating the Observers, the producers had some idea of how they would be introduced into the show, starting as a background character and only becoming a significant figure by the midpoint of the first season. Though they had some idea of the Observers' role, they gave Cerveris much leeway to develop the character in the manner he wanted, from choosing the outfit he would wear to his language mannerisms. Cerveris further is credited with creating the written Observer language during his scenes in "The Arrival", which the production team later extrapolated into a complete language for the show.

=== Shapeshifters ===
Shapeshifters are androids from the parallel universe, possessing superhuman strength and damage thresholds, and acting as soldiers in the war between the universes. They are able to take the form of any person by using a device that plugs into the roof of their mouth and the mouth of the target. This process occurs after the shapeshifter has killed the target prior to the transformation; without the device, the shapeshifter is locked in its current form. Shapeshifters also may be programmed as sleeper agents, unaware of their unusual nature until they are activated. The primary characteristic differentiates a human and a shapeshifter is the large quantity of mercury in their blood, and the presence of a metallic data disc at the base of their spine. William Bell believes the shapeshifters were designed this way to withstand travel between the universes.

The first shapeshifter witnessed by the Fringe division is one that follows Olivia after her meeting with William from the parallel world in the second-season premiere, "A New Day in the Old Town". He eventually kills Charlie and takes his place, using his position to find the location of Newton before he is identified by Olivia and killed. Several other shapeshifters have been shown in the series, including one that aids in the parallel universe's Olivia's escape from the prime universe.

Peter Bishop later takes it upon himself to kill all of the remaining shapeshifters in the Prime Universe, after he is able to decode their sleeper identities from the files on Fauxlivia's computer. He successfully kills all of the ones identified, but it remains to be seen if he eliminated all of them.

=== Thomas Jerome Newton ===
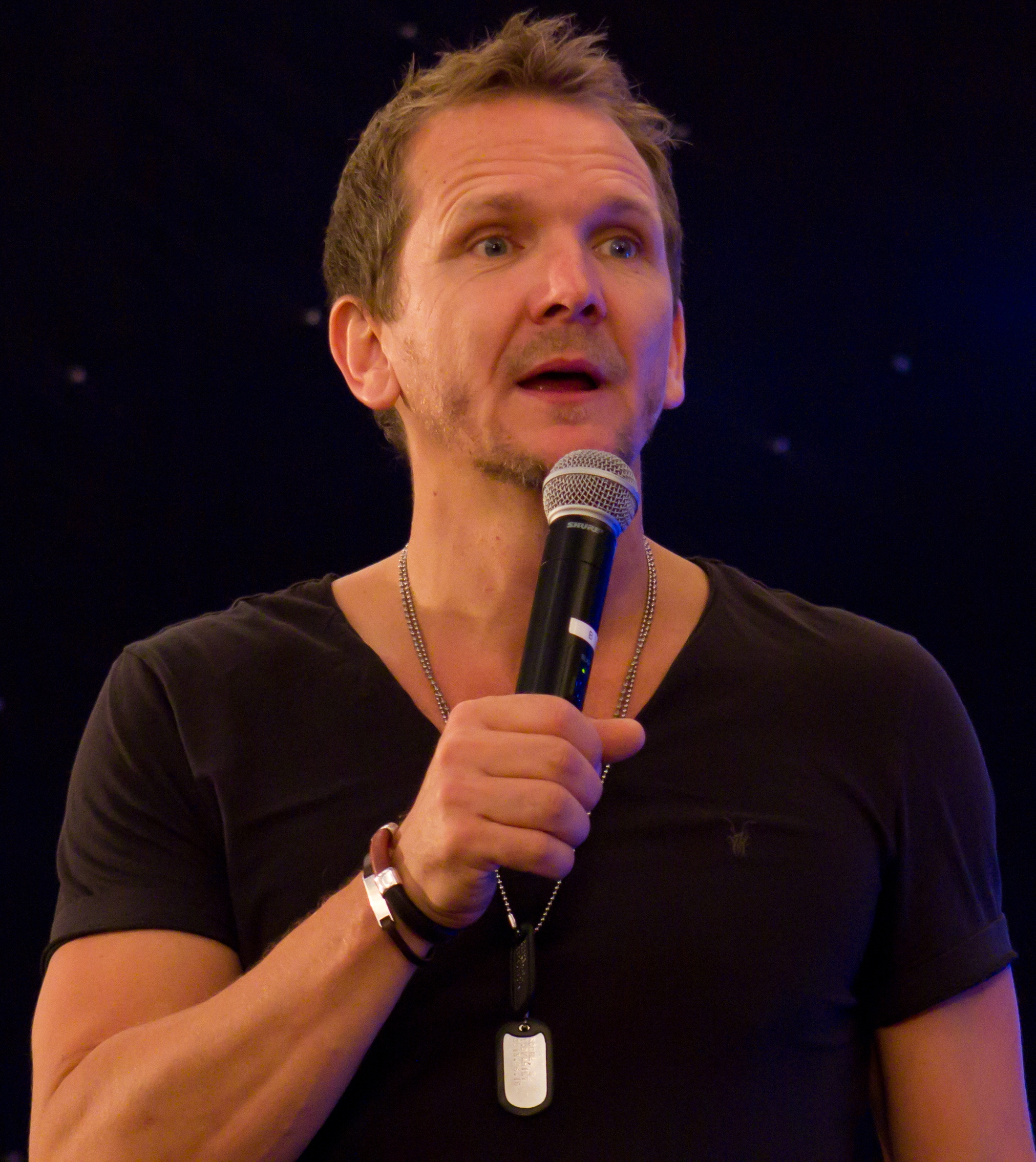
Sebastian Roché played Thomas Jerome Newton

Thomas Jerome Newton (portrayed by Sebastian Roché) is a leader among the shapeshifters and the main antagonist of Season 2.

When Olivia is transported to the parallel universe, she meets William Bell, who warns her that the shapeshifters active in her universe are looking for Newton, since his resurrection will make it possible for the shapeshifters to re-open the gateway between their universes. Olivia is returned to her universe, but does not remember the details of her meeting with Bell in time to stop the shapeshifters from succeeding in recovering Newton's cryogenically frozen head, and revive Newton.

Headed by Newton, the shapeshifters start tracking down and extracting pieces of brain tissue from three separate mental patients. Knowing that the three pieces were once taken from Walter's brain and when reinserted, they will cause Walter to remember how to open the gateway between the universes. Newton is then able to complete his first mission; He synchronizes the brain tissues, kidnaps Walter, reinserts them into Walter's brain, and then interrogates the scientist, gathering the information he needs.

Newton later re-surfaces, experimenting in opening portals to the parallel universe. Eventually he is able to successfully bring the shapeshifters' superior—simply referred to as "Mr. Secretary"—over to our universe. When Peter goes AWOL from Fringe Division upon learning of his real origin, he finds himself tracked by Newton and other shapeshifters. As Newton is finally able to corner Peter in his hotel room, he introduces him to his superior: the parallel universe United States Secretary of Defense, and likewise Peter's real father, the alternate Walter Bishop.

As alternate Walter successfully replaces Olivia with her parallel universe version, tension between Newton and Fauxlivia rises. When US Senator Van Horn is severely injured and revealed to be a shapeshifter, Newton orders him killed. In "Do Shapeshifters Dream of Electric Sheep?" Newton is finally caught by the FBI, but, by means of the alternate Olivia, he commits suicide before the Fringe division is able to get any information from him.

Thomas Jerome Newton is the name of David Bowie's character in The Man Who Fell to Earth; Bowie's own birth name was David Robert Jones.

=== Sam Weiss ===
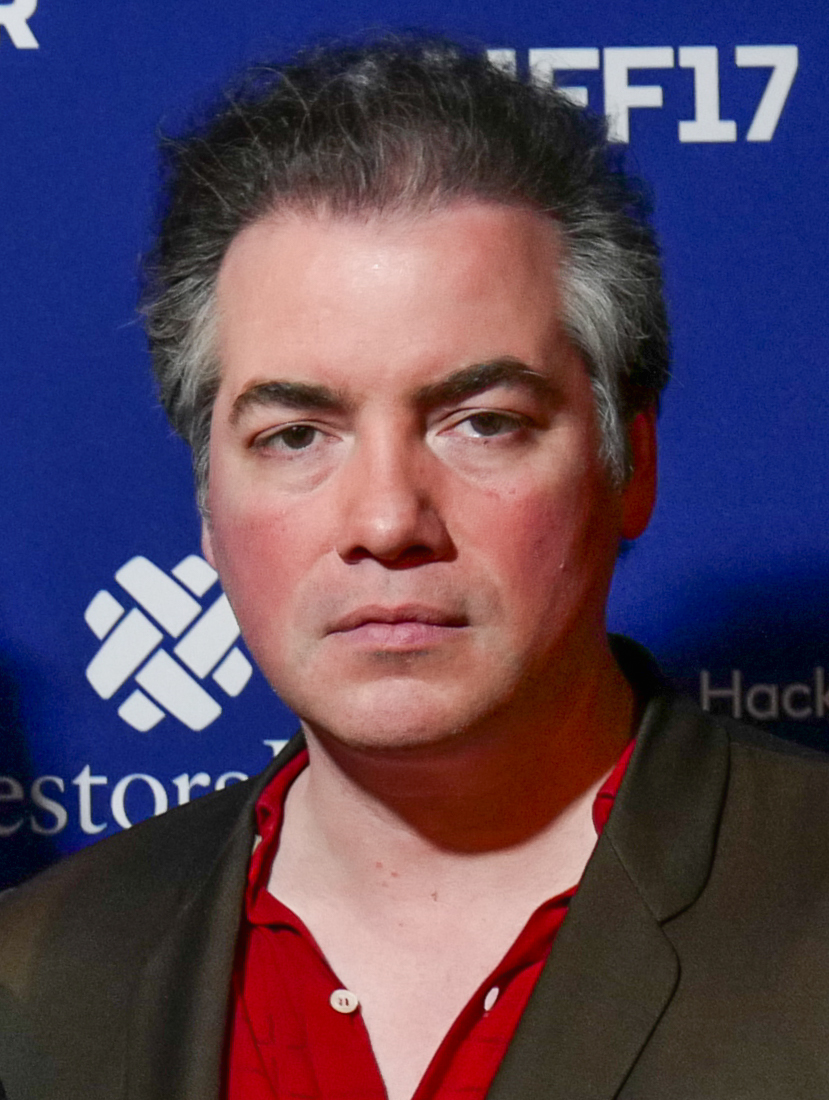
Kevin Corrigan played Sam Weiss

Sam Weiss (portrayed by Kevin Corrigan) is a friend of Nina Sharp who operates at a bowling alley, and helped her with her physical therapy process after she lost her arm. After Olivia's first visit to the parallel universe, he helps Olivia regain her ability to walk, partially through showing her how to bowl. He begins to establish a friendship with her, and Olivia pays him another visit after learning the truth about Peter's origin. It is later discovered that Sam Weiss and his antecedents seem to possess knowledge about the First People and the operation of the doomsday machine. The author of the English language First People book is shown to have been one "Seamus Wiles", published in the 1800s.

He also has other branches of mysterious knowledge, such as being able to predict that a series of seemingly random letters Olivia picks out will contain a message that would help her get over the death of Charlie. In the episode "The Last Sam Weiss", Sam explains that the name "Sam Weiss" has been handed down from several of his previous ancestors, the earliest having had found the bulk of the evidence on the First People, and that his line has been searching for more ever since. He is not mentioned after the episode "The Last Sam Weiss" until the ninth episode of the final season, when Olivia and Peter discover his body in a van, deducing that in this timeline, he died after the invasion protecting a signal tower, killing two observers and a loyalist in the process.

=== Elizabeth Bishop ===
Elizabeth Bishop (portrayed by Orla Brady) is Walter's wife in both universes. After Walter took the alternate Peter from the other universe, Elizabeth stayed at home with him, trying to convince Peter that she was his real mother. After running away from home, Peter finally comes to accept this Elizabeth as his mother, which later led to her suicide in 2000. The alternate version of Elizabeth is alive and well. When Peter returns to his home universe in "Over There", she is amazed to see him and bonds with him.

In the corrected timeline of season four, Elizabeth in the prime universe committed suicide shortly after losing her own Peter, and Walter failed to save the other Peter. Meanwhile her parallel universe counterpart continued to stay living, and also remained married to Walternate, who appeared to be estranged from her in the previous timeline. Peter ventures to her home in an attempt to have her convince Secretary Bishop to help him return to his timeline. She recognizes him for who he is, and agrees to take him to Secretary Bishop. In the following episode, she uses the Bridge to visit Walter in his Harvard lab. They have a lengthy conversation in which she forgives him for taking her son, and that Peter is not a punishment or a curse on him, as Walter had believed.

=== "Michael" / Anomaly XB-6783746 ===
"Michael" is a child Observer (portrayed by Spencer List and later by Rowan Longworth), first introduced in the first-season episode "Inner Child" and later re-introduced in the fifth season. The name "Michael" is given to him by adoptive parents who protect him in the 2036 future, as shown in the episode "Black Blotter", while later Captain Windmark cites him as Anomaly XB-6783746 in the episode of the same name.

Michael, like other Observers, is pale and bald; however, he does not possess the implant used by other Observers to further boost their intelligence while suppressing their emotions (and allowing them to time-shift). He is mute, but is able to communicate via writing, symbolic gestures, or by touching others and implanting thoughts into them. He has an empathic connection with others, particularly Olivia, and in "Inner Child," is able to help her stop a serial murderer. At the end of that episode, he is taken into adoptive care; as he is driven off, he sees September watch the vehicle drive away.

In the fifth and final season, Michael is revealed to be part of the plan by Walter and September to stop the Observers. Sometime after the Purge by the Observers, Walter hides Michael in a pocket dimension with the help of September (now stripped of his powers and known as Donald) ("Through the Looking Glass and What Walter Found There"). After Walter and the rest of Fringe Amber themselves, Donald returns to the pocket universe to extract Michael, then sheltering him with former Resistance fighters who escape detection by isolating themselves on a remote island. In 2036, Fringe is able to track Michael down, after discovering that he's missing from the pocket universe.

Michael is revealed to be September's progeny, created from September's genetic material sometime in the early 27th century. September purposely stopped the growth process, leaving Michael a child possessing both a powerful Observer-intellects and human emotion, creating an anomaly in danger of being destroyed by the Observers. September takes Michael to the past to hide him from the Observers. Much of September's machinations with Fringe in the first four seasons were to prepare Walter to use Michael for their plan to defeat the unemotional Observers ("The Boy Must Live"). In 2036, September, who has been made human by the Observers and has given himself the name of Donald O'Connor (after the actor in the movie "Singin' In The Rain") reveals his plan to take Michael to 2167, the year that human genetic experiments replacing all emotion with pure logic, will be performed. These experiments will ultimately lead to the creation of the Observers. Donald's plan is to convince the scientists of 2167 not to proceed with these experiments, by showing them that it is possible for humans to contain both logic and emotion and be peaceful, like Michael.

== Minor characters ==
- August (portrayed by Peter Woodward) is an Observer. He was killed after going rogue against his fellow Observers in the season two episode "August".
- Diane Broyles (portrayed by Karen Holness) is Phillip Broyles' (ex-)wife, and the mother of his two children—a son named Christopher and a daughter. While in our universe, Diane has left Phillip because of his obsession with his work, in the parallel universe, the Broyles were still happily married until the alternate Phillip was killed.
- Canaan A prototype shapeshifter created by David Robert Jones and abandoned when he turned out flawed. Unlike the current shapeshifters he must periodically absorb DNA to survive making him a form of DNA vampire. Helped the Fringe division track down Jones's base and was taken over to the prime universe to be examined by Walter to undo the damage Jones caused.
- Sally Clark (portrayed by Pascale Hutton) was one of the children that Walter and William Bell treated with Cortexiphan. She had the ability to create and control fire. Clark helped the Fringe team retrieve Peter from the parallel universe, but died after incinerating herself and the surrounding area.
- December (portrayed by Eugene Lipinski) is an Observer. December is one of the original 12 observers who came to the Fringe team's era to observe and report back to The Observers in the future. December appears to be the de facto leader of the 12 Observers. As September becomes more and more involved in helping and assisting Walter, Peter, Olivia, and Astrid, December strongly voices his opinions against it. In 2036, September (now called Donald O'Connor) goes to Apartment #513 to meet December. September asks December to help him find a final piece of a machine to reset time so that Observers never invade. December travels to 2609 to retrieve the piece. Olivia and Astrid arrive at his apartment to attain it, but December is found dead, hanged from the ceiling by the loyalists.
- Marilyn Dunham (portrayed by Amy Madigan and Ania Markiewicz) is Olivia's mother. While dead for many years in our universe, she is alive and well in the parallel universe, maintaining a close relationship with Fauxlivia.
- Rachel Dunham (portrayed by Ari Graynor) is Olivia's younger sister. She is the mother of Ella and resides with Olivia in a temporary living arrangement during season one, because of marriage difficulties. She seems to share a mutual attraction and several mutual interests with Peter Bishop which noticeably concerns her sister. However, following her moving out of Olivia's apartment in season two, nothing further develops between them. As of season three, Rachel has reconciled with her husband Greg, and lives with him in Chicago. The parallel universe version of Rachel died in child-birth along with her daughter. It is assumed that Alternate Rachel and Fauxlivia had a close bond.
- James Heath (portrayed by Omar Metwally) was one of the children that Walter and William Bell treated with Cortexiphan. The experiments left him with the ability to exchange energy with other Cortexiphan subjects. His ability allowed him to help the Fringe Division to open a portal to the parallel universe at the end of season two. However, the energy needed for doing so drained him, leading to his death.
- Henry Higgins (portrayed by Andre Royo) is a New York taxi driver in the parallel universe, becoming an ally in Olivia's struggle to get back to her original universe.
- Amy Jessup (portrayed by Meghan Markle) is an FBI agent with the New York Field Office introduced in the first episode of Season 2. She quickly becomes interested in and involved with Fringe Division. She seems more open to the existence of extraordinary phenomena than most other outsiders to the group, though it is suggested at the end of the episode that this may come from a religious standpoint.
- Rebecca Kibner (portrayed by Tegan Moss as a teenager, and Theresa Russell as an adult) is a former test subject of Walter's. When still a teenager she willingly subjected herself to hallucinogenics. During these experiments she got in contact with parallel dimension; and thus it was through Rebecca that Walter first learned about the parallel universe and some of its characteristics. Most notably she gained the ability to recognize shapeshifters. She apparently grew very fond of Walter, even sharing a kiss with him when they are reunited decades later.
- Nick Lane (portrayed by David Call) was one of the children that Walter and William Bell treated with Cortexiphan. He was partnered with Olivia during his time being treated, and had the ability to make people around him share his emotions. After learning to control his power, he helped Olivia and Walter cross over to the other universe to save Peter. He was shot and killed by Lincoln Lee, who seemed to know the alternate Nick.
- Johan Lennox (portrayed by Kenneth Tigar) is the warden of Wissenschaft Prison, the German correctional facility from where David Robert Jones escaped.
- Samantha Loeb (portrayed by Trini Alvarado) is Mitchell Loeb's wife and partner in crime. She is killed in a gunfight with Olivia.
- Edward Markham (portrayed by Clark Middleton) is a dealer of used books, and an old acquaintance of Peter's.
- Smith (portrayed by Roger R. Cross) acts as the right-hand man to the Shapeshifter and then to Thomas Jerome Newton. He is eventually shot dead by Olivia.
- Frank Stanton (portrayed by Philip Winchester) is a virologist and Fauxlivia's ex-fiancé.
- The Store Owner (portrayed by Stefan Arngrim) is the manager of the small Bronx typewriter shop. One of the store's back rooms hides one sole typewriter, through which parallel universe agents and shapeshifters communicate with their own dimension. Years prior to Olivia joining the Fringe division, the owner had been promised to have his injured legs healed in exchange for letting the alternate agents use his store. After Fauxlivia returns to the alternate universe, an alternate agent known as "the Librarian" finally injects the store owner with a fluid, effectively healing him.
- Senator James Van Horn (portrayed by Gerard Plunkett) oversees the Fringe team's work on behalf of Washington. When in a car accident, he is discovered to be a shapeshifter, and to have been so since before Olivia joined the team. It's discovered that he has been supplying "the other side" with information about the team all along. Attempts to reactivate his memories, in order to get more information on the over-all plan of the shapeshifters and the alternate Walter, fails.
- Carla Warren (portrayed by Jenni Blong) was Walter's lab assistant. She died in a fire, which resulted in Walter being sent to a mental hospital. She returned as one of Walter's hallucinations in Black Blotter.
