= 6:02 AM EST =

- Fringe episode
- The Fringe team survey the continued disintegration of their world at the hands of the Other Side.
- Episode no.: Season 3 Episode 20
- Directed by: Jeannot Szwarc
- Written by: David Wilcox; Josh Singer; Graham Roland
- Production code: 3X6120
- Original air date: April 22, 2011

Guest appearances
- Kevin Corrigan as Sam Weiss; Ryan McDonald as Brandon Fayette; Seth Gabel as Lincoln Lee; Matt Ellis as Richie

Episode chronology
← Previous "Lysergic Acid Diethylamide"	Next → "The Last Sam Weiss"
- Fringe season 3

"6:02 AM EST" is the 20th episode of the third season of the American science fiction drama television series Fringe, and the 63rd episode overall. The narrative follows the activation of the doomsday device by the parallel universe, and the subsequent devastating consequences experienced by our world.

David Wilcox, Josh Singer, and Graham Roland co-wrote the episode, while Jeannot Szwarc directed it. Guest star Kevin Corrigan returned as the mysterious Sam Weiss. Actor John Noble and executive producer Jeff Pinkner have referred to "6:02 AM EST" as the start of an "epic trilogy", as it and the following two episodes would be "linked in one continuous story arc".

The episode received generally positive reviews; many critics noted its purpose was meant to set the stage for the season finale.

== Plot ==
In the parallel universe, Walternate has been able to use the blood sample from Fauxlivia's child to create a serum made up of half of Peter Bishop's DNA. He uses this serum to activate his doomsday machine at 6:02 am. In the prime universe, this results in a series of unusual events, including the formation of a vortex that wipes out a long swath of land in rural New York state, including a herd of sheep and two of their shepherds. The Fringe division learns that their version of the machine activated at 6:02 am on its own, and Walter suspects the two machines are tied by quantum entanglement, with their version of the machine destroying their world to stabilize the parallel one. Unknown to the prime universe, Walternate's experiment has not affected the stability of their world.

In the prime universe, Nina Sharp helps to set up Massive Dynamic's resources to track these occurrences, preparing to deploy limited supplies of the amber substance to contain them if needed. Nina advises Olivia to find Sam Weiss, a man that William Bell had trusted and instructed Nina to also listen to. However, Sam has disappeared and cannot be found. Walter and Peter, along with Massive Dynamic staff, debate how to disable the machine, but Peter realizes that he himself is the only option. Walter comes to recognize that the Observer's efforts from earlier ("The Firefly") were to prepare him to lose Peter. After preparing himself, Peter goes to touch the machine, but is sent flying by an electrical spark, wounding him and knocking him unconscious. At the hospital chapel, Walter tries to find repentance from God for his actions, while Olivia arrives after hearing the news. She steps outside to observe the sunset when Sam Weiss runs up to her and demands to be taken to the machine to stop what is already happening.

In the parallel universe, Walternate's machine has been detected by the Fringe division and Fauxlivia and her team go to investigate. When Walternate tells them to stand down, Fauxilivia asks him about her recent mission to the prime universe and the part that she recovered. Walternate admits to her that the machine has been activated, having sacrificed his own son Peter to allow Fauxlivia's son to live. Fauxlivia becomes distressed at Walternate's actions, and later returns to Liberty Island to obtain the devices to allow her to cross to the prime universe, but is caught before she can use them. Walternate locks her away, seeing her as a traitor to his cause.

== Production ==
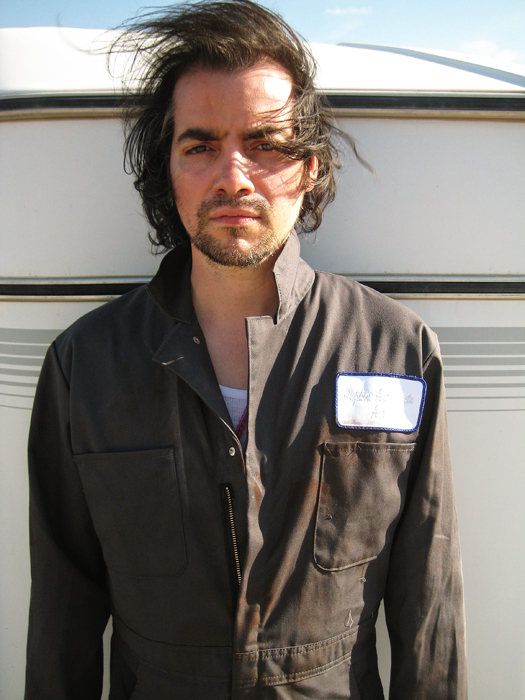
"6:02 AM EST" featured the return of Sam Weiss (played by actor Kevin Corrigan).

"6:02 AM EST" was written by co-executive producers David Wilcox and Josh Singer, and executive story editor Graham Roland; filmmaker Jeannot Szwarc directed it.

Though the season 3 finale was scheduled to be just an hour long, executive producer Jeff Pinkner confirmed that the last three episodes would be "linked in one continuous story arc". This was a reflection of Pinkner and fellow executive producer J.H. Wyman's intent to have the last three episodes of every season seem like "you're turning the last page of a chapter in a novel. And usually in a good novel, the last pages [of a chapter] compels you forward with a new understanding of what the subject matter is and you get deeper and you can't wait to turn that page." Some media outlets have referred to the episodes as a "three-part third-season finale".

During a conference call with journalists, actor John Noble called "6:02 AM EST" and the next two episodes of the third season an "epic trilogy". He elaborated "All year we've been heading toward the fact that there seems to be an inevitable conflict between the two universes. And we've gotten to know the people on both sides now, so we now bring it to a conclusion starting with '6:02.' By the next episode we start to deal with the issue because our earth starts to deteriorate. Events start to happen here which indicate that our world is degrading. And so everyone has to move into another gear and say, 'Okay, this problem is not going to go away. It's now affecting our side. We do have a machine which we believe can assist in the resolution of this problem.' And so the episode basically deals with the lead-up in the first part of that trilogy, leading up to the use of that machine." In the same interview, Noble called the episode's title very critical to the series, stating "That time frame plays through the three episodes. Very important to remember as we get to the finale, that time frame."

In March 2011, TVLine's Michael Ausiello exclusively confirmed that previous guest actor Kevin Corrigan would be returning for the twentieth and twenty-first episodes of the season. Corrigan last appeared in the season's twelfth episode "Concentrate and Ask Again"; his role in "6:02 AM EST" and the following week's episode "The Last Sam Weiss" marked his sixth and seventh appearances on Fringe, respectively.

As with other Fringe episodes, Fox released a science lesson plan in collaboration with Science Olympiad for grade school children, focusing on the science seen in "6:02 AM EST", with the intention of having "students learn about weather forecasting."

== Reception ==
=== Ratings ===
On its initial broadcast in the United States, the episode was watched by an estimated 3.51 million viewers, with a 1.2/4 ratings share for those aged 18–49. It was seen by 14 percent fewer viewers than the previous week, though several other series airing that night were also down in viewers. The 1.2 ratings share resulted in a series low for Fringe.

=== Reviews ===
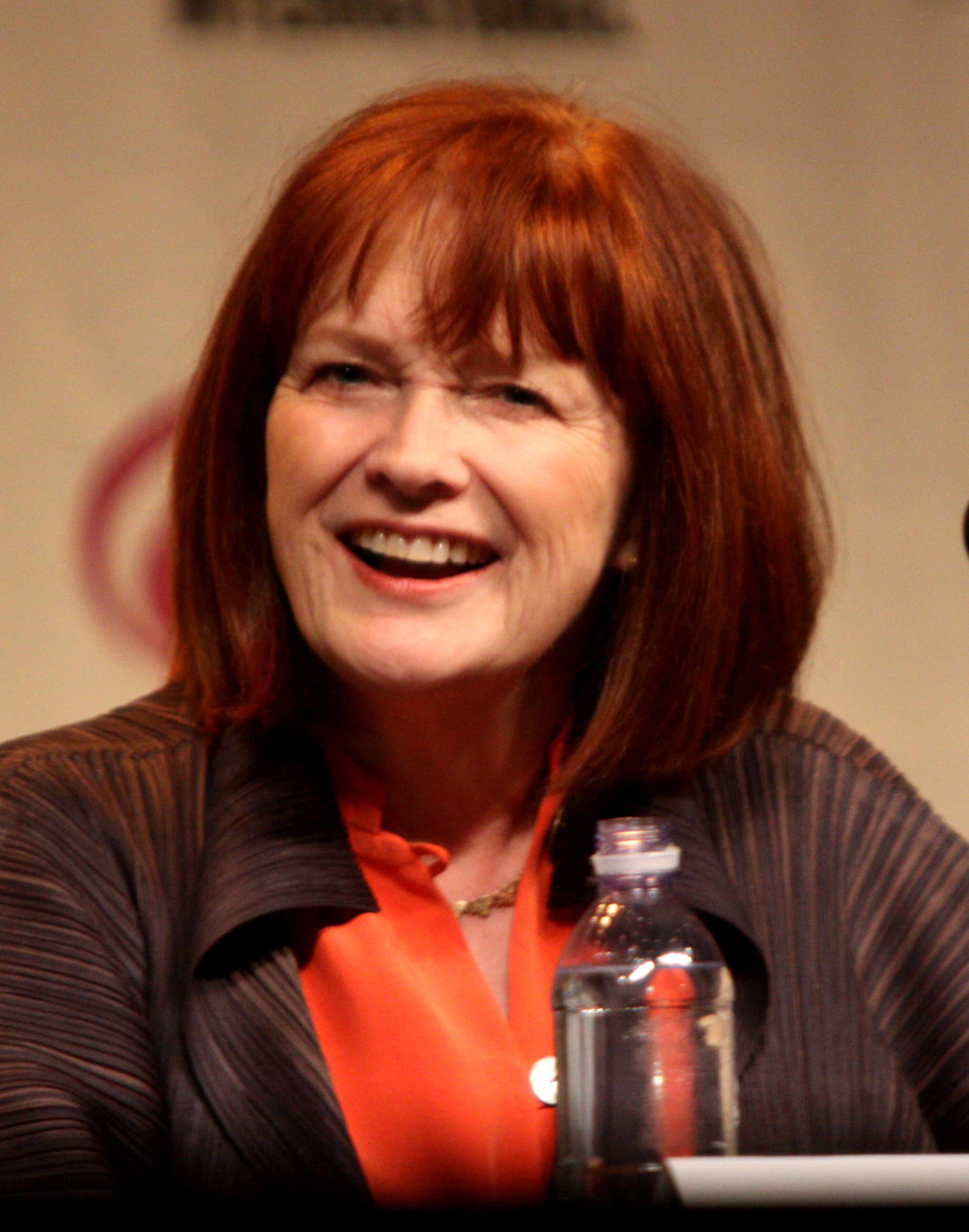
Blair Brown received positive recognition for her performance.

The A.V. Club's Noel Murray graded the episode with an A−, explaining that though he did not want to give a full review until the season finale aired, he was "enjoying how Fringe's third season is wrapping up", such as "the cross-cutting between Earth-1 and Earth-2, and the sense of imminent doom." Murray continued that he "especially liked... that in the midst of all this end-times rush, it pauses periodically to check in with the various characters in short one-on-one scenes, strengthening our sense of what these relationships mean. (It's something that Fringe has gotten good at in the past year-and-a-half, and something I wouldn't have predicted for the show back in season one.)" Writing for the Los Angeles Times, critic Andrew Hanson noted Fringe is preparing for the finale, calling "6:02 AM EST" a "movement episode [that] give[s] an opportunity to get everyone into place for the big climax" in a vein similar to the television series Lost. Hanson enjoyed the two "sleights of hand", explaining he was surprised by Fauxlivia's universe-crossing device failing and what happened to Peter after touching the machine.

IGN's Ramsey Isler rated the episode 7.5/10, writing "This week's episode wasn't an edge-of-your seat masterpiece, but it scores high marks for character development and putting the pieces in place for a great season finale." Like Hanson, Isler loved the outcome of Peter and the machine, calling it a "nice plot twist"; he also praised Blair Brown as "one of the many under-appreciated elements of the series." Writing for Mania.com, critic Kurt Anthony Krug acknowledged the episode "had a tough act to follow" after the previous week's episode, but stated "it's still pretty good". Sarah Stegall from SFScope was happy to see Peter "taking a more active role" with the machine plotline, but disliked the episode's religious elements, believing that Walter's scene in the church "felt forced". Stegall concluded her review noting "This episode felt like the first part of a chess game, as the pieces are arranged on the board. The big move is coming up, the endgame that will decide who wins and who loses".
