= Lysergic Acid Diethylamide (Fringe) =

- Fringe episode
- Peter (left) and Walter marvel at the animated world inside Olivia's mind while talking to William Bell (right)
- Episode no.: Season 3 Episode 19
- Directed by: Joe Chappelle
- Story by: Jeff Pinkner; J. H. Wyman; Akiva Goldsman
- Teleplay by: J. H. Wyman; Jeff Pinkner
- Production code: 3X6119
- Original air date: April 15, 2011

Guest appearances
- Chris Bradford as Olivia's stepfather; Ulrich Thomsen as Zeppelin Man / Mr. X; Leonard Nimoy as William Bell; Ryan McDonald as Brandon Fayette

Episode chronology
← Previous "Bloodline"	Next → "6:02 AM EST"
- Fringe season 3

"Lysergic Acid Diethylamide" is the 19th episode of the third season of the American science fiction drama television series Fringe, and the 62nd episode overall. The narrative followed the Fringe team's attempts to extract William Bell from Olivia's brain by entering her mind with the help of LSD.

The episode's teleplay was co-written by J. H. Wyman and Jeff Pinkner, while Wyman and Pinkner co-wrote the story with Akiva Goldsman. Joe Chappelle served as director. It marked the return of previous guest actor Leonard Nimoy, who had announced his retirement the previous year. Production of the animated portions was completed by Zoic Studios in an eight-week effort, the largest amount of work hours required to produce a Fringe episode.

The episode first aired on April 15, 2011 in the United States on the Fox network. An estimated 3.6 million viewers tuned in, helping the episode earn a 1.4 ratings share for those 18–49, tying a series low. Critical reception was generally positive, as multiple reviewers praised the creativity of the writers.

== Plot ==
The mind of William Bell (Leonard Nimoy) still possesses Olivia's (Anna Torv) body after several failed attempts to extract it to recently deceased corpses. Walter (John Noble) and William believe that they have less than a day before Olivia's mind will be lost. They realize that Olivia is unaware that she has been possessed by William's mind, and instead has likely locked her ego away, making it difficult to contact her by normal means. Walter comes up with a plan: he and Peter (Joshua Jackson) will enter Olivia's mind with the aid of LSD to locate her ego and help it to regain dominance in her mind, while Walter hopes to download William's mind into a computer.

Inside Olivia's mind, Walter and Peter find they stand out as invaders, and the people that populate her mind, including a vision of her step-father (Chris Bradford), seek to stop them. Walter sees someone sending a Morse code signal from William Bell's office in one of the World Trade Center buildings. After evading a crowd and a trap set by a false vision of Nina Sharp (Blair Brown), they arrive at Bell's office, where they find William waiting for them as an animated cartoon.

The three are unable to find clues to Olivia's ego, something that William thought would be present if Olivia was looking to be found. Peter realizes that when Olivia is scared, she retreats to somewhere safe, and suggests they search her mind's version of Jacksonville, her childhood home. As they travel by zeppelin, William tries to encourage Walter that he no longer needs Bell's guidance. They are soon attacked by a man (Ulrich Thomsen) wearing an X-marked T-shirt, who tears open the side of the zeppelin; Walter is pulled out by the rush of air and falls to his death—waking him back in the real world.

William and Peter safely land in Jacksonville, and Peter directs them to find the home among the military housing where Olivia stayed at as a child, marked by a red-painted door by her birth-father. Once there, Peter finds the adult Olivia waiting for him, but realizes by her eyes that this is not her. A younger Olivia reveals herself as Olivia's true ego; assured of Peter's identity, she willingly goes with him and Bell. However, they are attacked by the image of her stepfather and several military personnel. Peter sacrifices himself to protect her, waking back up in the real world. Olivia is able to stand up against her past fears and stops their advance. William explains that she will be able to return to possession of her body as Walter, in the real world, attempts to extract William's mind.

Olivia wakes back up to the real world, free of William's mind. Walter find that his effort to store William's mind has failed, and takes time to consider William's last message he gave to Olivia: "I knew the dog wouldn't hunt". Later, Peter visits Olivia to rekindle their relationship when he notices a drawing of the same man in the X T-shirt he saw in her mind. Olivia cannot name the man, but nonchalantly refers to him as the person who is going to kill her.

== Production ==
The episode's teleplay was co-written by co-showrunners Jeff Pinkner and J. H. Wyman, while Pinkner, Wyman, and consulting producer Akiva Goldsman co-wrote the story. Executive producer Joe Chappelle served as director.

"Lysergic Acid Diethylamide" features the return of guest actor Leonard Nimoy to television, as he had previously announced his intention to retire from acting. Nimoy stated that when the writers approached him about the role, he jokingly commented on having experience playing characters returning from the dead—referring to the death of Spock in the Star Trek movies— but expressed interest because of his appreciation of the show and its writing in general. Nimoy has stated that if the writers wanted to use him in future episodes, he would be happy to continue to help.

=== Filming ===
The cast found out a couple of weeks before filming the episode that parts would be in animation. The animated portions were produced with Zoic Studios. Over an eight-week period, the studio defined the primary Fringe characters into their animated counterparts, and used footage of the actors and fight scene choreography to provide motion for the characters. The animators used a stand-in for Nimoy so that he did not have to fly to Vancouver from Los Angeles. The studio aimed to achieve a mixed look between stylized and authenticity to allow them to focus on animating the characters' emotions. The work also include recreating some of the settings already established from Fringe, such as Bell's office. Other parts of Olivia's dreamscape were handpainted scenes, projected onto 3D plates and used within the animation software. Andrew Orloff, Zoic's creative director commented, "This project was one of the most intensive and rewarding we have worked on in Zoic's history. It was an incredible undertaking, from the amazing writers at Fringe to the animation production that is both steeped in tradition and groundbreaking." The episode ultimately contained sixteen minutes of animation; executive producer Jeff Pinkner noted that the amount of man hours placed into the episode was "by far" the longest the series has had to date. The writers have cited Sgt. Pepper's Lonely Hearts Club Band and Waltz with Bashir as influences for the episode.

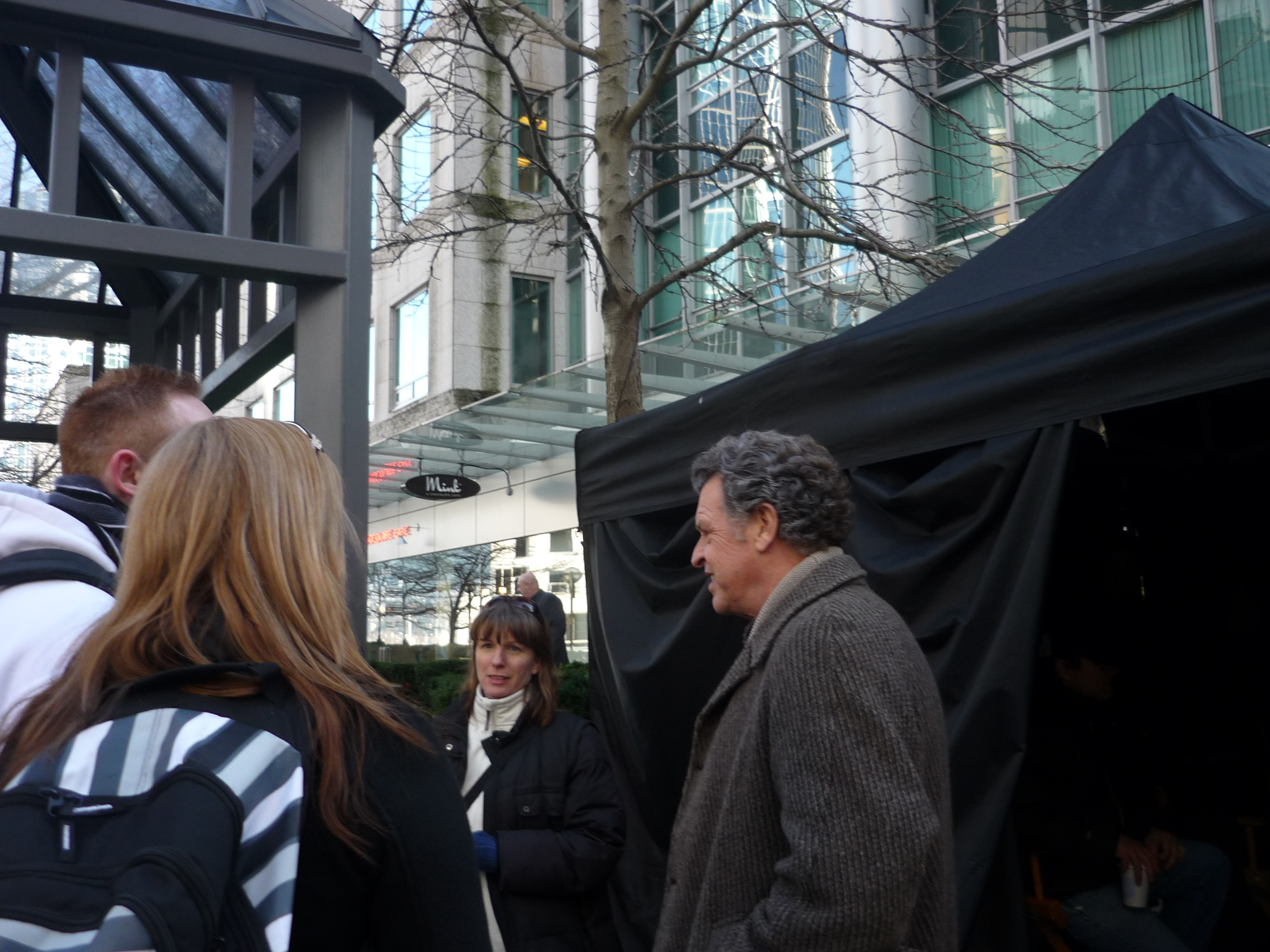
John Noble on location during the filming of "Lysergic Acid Diethylamide" on February 20, 2011

John Noble talked about the episode in an interview with The A.V. Club, "This is part of the risk-taking that our creators will go for. It hadn't been done before. We wanted to find a solution to a plot problem. And we still had Leonard Nimoy's presence there, even though he [William Bell] was dead. So they came up with the bizarre idea of putting his presence into Anna Torv, which is outrageous. Outrageous, and yet we did it, and had a lot of fun doing it. Then we had to get him out of it. Because Leonard's officially retired, so we did the animation to use his voice."

"Lysergic Acid Diethylamide" concluded Anna Torv's "Bellivia" arc. Pinkner defended the storyline against some critical fans, "We understand that some people were frustrated, just like some people were frustrated with the idea of Bolivia having a baby. But there are things that we feel are entertaining to us, and that allow us to explore themes that... we can't otherwise access. And we think that if it's entertaining, and it allows Anna a chance to stretch, and it gives Walter Bishop his old partner back for an episode so we can see what they were like together... those are also perfectly valid reasons for doing those episodes." Wyman added, "Yeah, it was important. I mean, you know, for people that say it was just a diversion, well, there was something really important involved in that Walter/William relationship. That was part of Walter's self-actualization, that moment when William Bell says, 'Look, you have to be on your own. You have to walk the path that you believe in. You gain some humility where there once was hubris, and it's really important that you depend on yourself.' Part of our plan has always been to get Walter to embrace his flaws and uniqueness as strengths, rather than thinking of them inhibiting his performance as a scientist and as a character. We were really anxious to get that across, and the best person to do that for us was William Bell, because Walter depended so much on William in so many different ways. So that story came around at a time where we really needed to have it." Because the season finale did not resolve the plotline of Olivia and the man from the blimp, Pinkner commented in a post-finale interview that "It's definitely still in play. Without being too spoilery, there are things you think you have time to explore in any given season, but don't. But yes, we are very interested in that moment and the implications of that."

The live action parts of "Lysergic Acid Diethylamide" were shot along west Hastings Street in Vancouver during the latter part of February 2011.

=== Marketing ===
A fourth season of Fringe was announced on March 25, 2011. To celebrate this, Fox began a promotion the day "Lysergic Acid Diethylamide" aired, lasting four weeks until the season finale. Fans of the series were given the opportunity to win unique replicas of certain Fringe props at Fox's website or at the Facebook account for Fringe.

As with other Fringe episodes, Fox released a science lesson plan in collaboration with Science Olympiad for grade school children, focusing on the science seen in "Lysergic Acid Diethylamide", with the intention of having "students learn about wind power and turbine design."

== Cultural references ==
Astrid downloads the 1972 version of the PBS children's show ZOOM for Walter on his tablet.

== Reception ==
=== Ratings ===
"Lysergic Acid Diethylamide" was watched by 3.6 million viewers on initial broadcast, with a 1.4 rating in the target 18–49 age demographic, tying its previous season low. The episode lost 100,000 viewers between the first half and the second. SFScope Fringe reviewer Sarah Stegall noted that the episode's ratings were not surprising, considering the series had just returned from a three-week break. Time shifted viewing led to an increase of 69 percent in the all-important 18–49 demographic, a 2.2 rating share. This was the largest percent increase of the week.

=== Reviews ===
"In a season already marked by surprise twists and innovative storylines, the 19th episode stands head and shoulders above all others. Bold and daring, funny and shocking, it challenges audiences to follow a complicated plot through visual changes like turning the show into a cartoon for half the episode, showing us a tripped-out Broyles blowing bubbles, and offering us references to genre movies like Inception. I have no doubt that audience reaction to such an atypical and peculiar episode will be both loud and divided; this will be one that fans either love or hate. Myself, I come down on the love side. Big time."

— SFScope reviewer Sarah Stegall

Writing for the Los Angeles Times, Andrew Hanson questioned whether the writers had been using drugs lately because of the surge of drug-related episodes; though he loved it, he acknowledged that the episode was one "you are either going to love or hate", explaining that it "got a little crazy using Olivia's mind as a setting, [but] it stays grounded through the emotional current running underneath... you have to give Fringe credit for taking a risky, bold move." SFScope writer Sarah Stegall called the episode "brilliant, risky, fascinating, and dangerous. It's not a tack this show can afford to take very often, but I like it when it does."

The A.V. Club's Noel Murray graded the episode with an A−, admitting that despite its faults, he "enjoyed the hell out of" it. He loved it for several reasons: he is a big fan of Anna Torv's Bellivia performance and its plotline, the drugs incorporated into the plot, its Inception-like qualities, the animation, and Bell's final goodbye. IGN reviewer Ramsey Isler rated the episode 8.0/10, calling it "one of the most memorable Fringe episodes to date." Like Murray, Isler also noted the similarities to Inception as well as to the film Yellow Submarine (1968) and the science fiction novel A Scanner Darkly (1977). However, Isler did remark that "Lysergic Acid Diethylamide" "end[ed] a string of episodes that didn't really have much point", though it was a "beautiful episode that doesn't really do much for the mythology of the series... it sure was a blast to watch."

TV Guide ranked "Lysergic Acid Diethylamide" the 24th best television episode of the year, while The A.V. Club staff highlighted the episode in their review of the best television shows of 2011. Jeff Jensen of Entertainment Weekly named "Lysergic Acid Diethylamide" the fourteenth best episode of the series, explaining "Another nutty number 19, another loony LSD trip, another chance for Fringe to get innovative: With William Bell occupying Olivia's body and Olivia's mind hidden away within her dense and tumultuous subconscious, Walter and Peter dropped acid and download into Olivia's brain to rescue her. Among many memorable bits: The lengthy animated sequence (Belly, why are you a cartoon?), buttoned-up Broyles loopy reaction to LSD exposure, and the mysterious Max X (now believed to be a riff on Bell), the Zeppelin saboteur who Olivia predicted would one day kill her."

=== Awards and nominations ===
"Lysergic Acid Diethylamide" was nominated for Best Episode at the 2011 Portal Awards, given annually by Airlock Alpha. It lost to the Game of Thrones episode "Winter Is Coming".
