= The Last Sam Weiss =

- Fringe episode
- Peter Bishop looks at the future One World Trade Center
- Episode no.: Season 3 Episode 21
- Directed by: Thomas Yatsko
- Written by: Monica Owusu-Breen; Alison Schapker
- Production code: 3X6121
- Original air date: April 29, 2011

Guest appearances
- Kevin Corrigan as Sam Weiss; Ryan McDonald as Brandon Fayette; Roger Haskett as Dr. Harris; Kathryn Kirkpatrick as Nurse Sheila; Karin Konoval as Dr. Christine Albright; Michael Ryan as Gary; Carri Toivanen as Kara; Keenan Tracey as Nate

Episode chronology
← Previous "6:02 AM EST"	Next → "The Day We Died"
- Fringe season 3

"The Last Sam Weiss" is the penultimate episode of the third season of the Fox science fiction television series Fringe, and the 64th episode overall. The storyline follows the continuing disintegration of the prime universe, as the Fringe team races to prevent the destruction of their world. FBI agent Olivia Dunham recruits Sam Weiss for help while Peter recovers from touching the doomsday machine in the previous episode.

Executive producers Monica Owusu-Breen and Alison Schapker co-wrote the episode, and cinematographer Thomas Yatsko directed. "The Last Sam Weiss" is meant to be the middle of an "epic trilogy," as the season finale aired the following week. Guest actors Kevin Corrigan and Ryan McDonald returned as Weiss and Brandon Fayette, respectively.

On its initial broadcast on April 29, 2011 in the United States, an estimated 3.49 million viewers tuned in. More viewers in America time shifted the episode than watched it live, leading to a 67 percent increase in the 18–49 demographic. This was the highest increase on any network for that week. While the episode received generally positive reviews, television critics were divided about the ending, with some comparing it to the television series Lost.

== Plot ==
In the prime universe, the doomsday machine creates numerous static lightning storms along the eastern seaboard. As Walter and Astrid see to Peter's recovery after his failed attempt to enter the machine, Olivia takes Sam Weiss to the machine. Weiss states that the machine is not meant to be a doomsday device and that the strange effects are a byproduct of the machine's "frustration" due to its believing that Peter is already inside the machine. Weiss suggests finding a proverbial "crowbar" that can be used to break the shield protecting the device to give Peter enough time to enter it. As Olivia travels with Weiss to collect a box and the key containing this crowbar, Weiss explains that he descends from a long unbroken line of men named Sam Weiss whose forebear found the incomplete collection of information on the First People and the device, and have sought to try to find the rest. Upon collecting both the box and key, they open it to find a parchment, revealing that Olivia herself is the crowbar.

Meanwhile, Walter and Astrid determine that most of the effects of the device are occurring in the areas between western Massachusetts and Liberty Island—the locations of the doomsday machines in the prime and parallel universes respectively—aligned like iron filings around the ends of a magnet. Walter convinces Broyles to move the device to Liberty Island to reduce the area affected by the strange events. During this time, Peter wakes with confused memories and leaves the hospital, traveling to a location in New York City and buying a silver dollar coin from a pawn shop.

Olivia and Weiss bring the parchment to Walter, who recognizes that Olivia's telekinetic powers must be used to turn off the machine in the parallel universe. To prepare Olivia, they use the quantum entangled Selectric typewriter that the shapeshifters had used to contact the parallel universe. Olivia struggles unsuccessfully with trying to activate the typewriter, even with Walter's support. Peter is soon discovered in New York, about the same time that the machine has been moved into position. Walter and Olivia rejoin him, finding him confused and believing himself to be in the parallel universe. Peter eventually comes to his senses, with Walter believing his confusion to be a temporary result of the head trauma. Astrid calls the trio from the lab, revealing that the typewriter is typing out "Be a better man than your father", a phrase that Olivia and Peter have talked about before, thus giving them hope that Olivia will be able to disengage the parallel universe's device. After she does so, Peter takes a moment to recall the events of his life, including his experiences with Walter and Olivia, and then steps into the machine.

Peter wakes up wounded on a chaotic street in downtown New York City. He finds himself in unfamiliar territory, facing a plaque dedicated in 2021 to the victims of the September 11 attacks, and is quickly assisted by an officer of the militarized Fringe division.

== Production ==
The episode was co-written by co-executive producers Monica Owusu-Breen and Alison Schapker, while being directed by cinematographer Thomas Yatsko. "The Last Sam Weiss" was the second-to-last episode of the season. Though the season 3 finale was scheduled to be just an hour long, executive producer Jeff Pinkner confirmed that the last three episodes would be "linked in one continuous story arc". This was a reflection of Pinkner and co-executive producer J.H. Wyman's intent to have the last three episodes of every season seem like "you're turning the last page of a chapter in a novel. And usually in a good novel, the last pages [of a chapter] compels you forward with a new understanding of what the subject matter is and you get deeper and you can’t wait to turn that page." Some media outlets have referred to the episodes as a "three-part third-season finale".

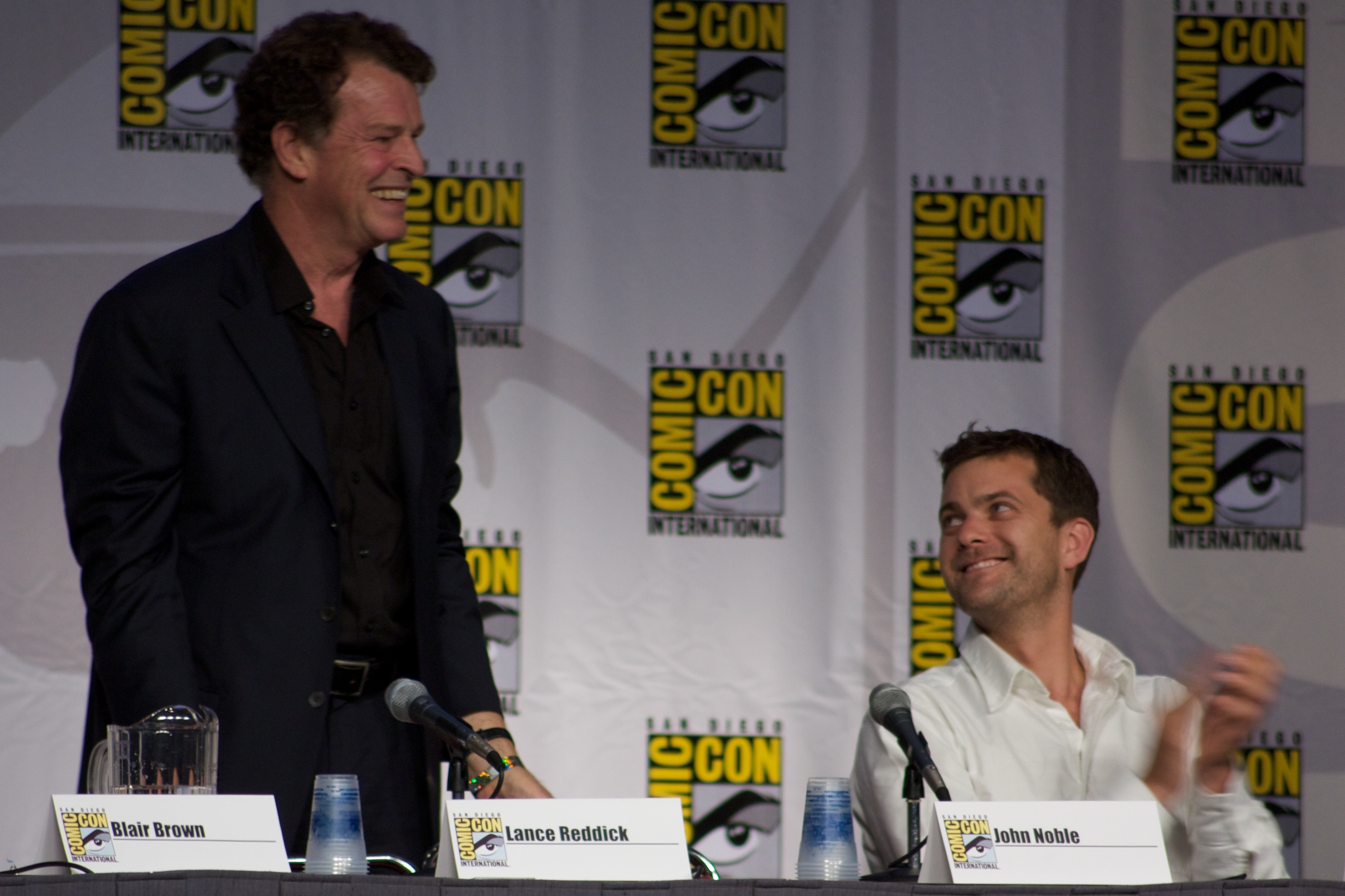
John Noble (picture left) called his character's nudity the series' "funniest thing yet".

Actor John Noble called the beginning scene with Olivia and Walter naked "the funniest thing" yet, explaining "The writers keep throwing challenges at me, because I never say no. They said, 'Okay, John, you’ll do a scene naked.' I said 'Okay.' And so that was a big surprise. So I do this scene, this strange scene with Anna Torv, without any clothes on. Anna’s staying at the Bishop house with Walter running around with no clothes on except for a pair of slippers, getting breakfast. She comes round the corner and catches him in the full monty, going, 'Oh no!' Didn’t know where to look. That was probably one of the most fun things we ever did. Anna’s reaction was priceless to that. I haven’t seen the scene yet, but it was hilarious to do it."

In March 2011, TVLine's Michael Ausiello exclusively confirmed that previous guest actor Kevin Corrigan would be returning for the twentieth and twenty-first episodes of the season. Corrigan last appeared in the season's twelfth episode "Concentrate and Ask Again"; his role in "The Last Sam Weiss" marked his seventh appearance on Fringe. The actor expressed appreciation that his character's name was used in the title, but was disappointed it alluded to his final appearance in the show to date. The episode is Corrigan's last credit on the series, though he previously stated his interest in returning as one of his ancestors or as a doppelganger.

As with other Fringe episodes, Fox released a science lesson plan in collaboration with Science Olympiad for grade school children, focusing on the science seen in "The Last Sam Weiss", with the intention of having "students learn about static electricity and how it is created and dissipated."

== Reception ==
=== Ratings ===
On its first broadcast in the United States on April 29, 2011, the episode was watched by an estimated 3.49 million viewers and scored a 1.3 ratings share among adults 18–49. More viewers time shifted the episode than watched it live, as its ratings increased 67 percent in the 18–49 demographic, resulting in a 2.0 rating; this was the largest increase out of every other television series airing that week.

=== Reviews ===
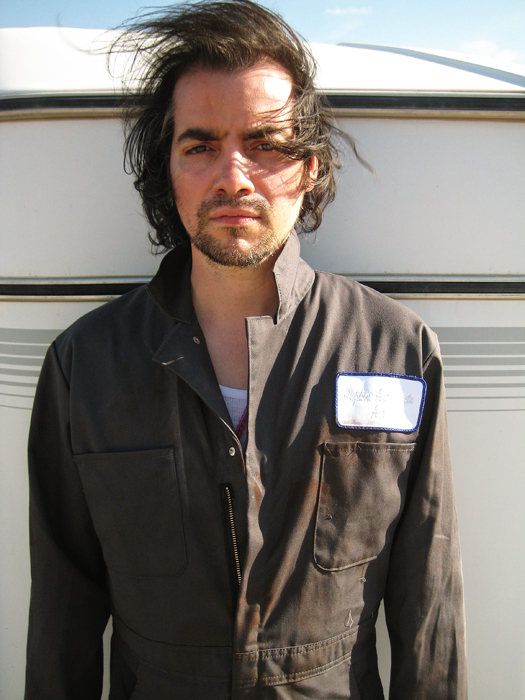
The titular character, played by Kevin Corrigan, was praised by critics.

"The Last Sam Weiss" received generally positive reviews from television critics. Ken Tucker from Entertainment Weekly called the episode "equally surprising in its plotting and pacing", praised Sam and Olivia's scenes together, and believed the ending to be "mind-blowing" and "both startling and thrilling". The A.V. Club's Noel Murray graded the episode with an A−, writing the first half "wasn't quite as rollicking as last week's episode, because there was a lot more set-up and explanation required to keep the story moving" but "then the second half brought in all the emotion and tension, topped off by an unexpected gut-punch of an ending." Murray admitted his "eyes glazed over a bit" during the search for the "crowbar", believing it to be "little too Lost-y", but "the quirky Corrigan as Weiss helped put all the mumbo-jumbo over".

SFScope columnist Sarah Stegall agreed with Murray's Lost comparison, writing that the ending of the episode was "right out of the Lost playbook, a little too on the nose for my liking." Stegall did however call it a "good bridge episode, taking us from the setup of last week to the denouement next week, when it all comes together." IGN writer Ramsey Isler was more positive about the final sequence, explaining that the "last five minutes of this story changed everything, and made me excited about the series again." While praising the special effects, he also noted his displeasure that Sam Weiss "ends up not being as mystical or magical as previous stories hinted". Isler wished Corrigan had more screen time in the episode, calling it "under-utilization of a great character the writers have spent a lot of time building up." He rated it 7.5/10, an indication of a "good" episode, but criticized its "slow" pacing.

While Isler was pleased that Olivia appeared on the drawing, Stegall expressed skepticism that this revelation "smacks too much of manipulation, which would render our heroes' actions and sacrifices meaningless." TV.com staff highlighted "The Last Sam Weiss" as one of the best television episodes of the 2010–11 United States network television schedule.
