= Inner Child (Fringe) =

- Fringe episode
- Episode no.: Season 1 Episode 15
- Directed by: Fred Toye
- Written by: Julia Cho; Brad Caleb Kane
- Production code: 3T7664
- Original air date: April 7, 2009

Guest appearances
- Spencer List as Child; Jeremy Shamos as the Artist; Ari Graynor as Rachel Dunham; Lily Pilblad as Ella Dunham; Erik Palladino as Eliot Michaels; Victor Williams as Phil; Alicia Goranson as Samantha Gilmore; Michael Cerveris as the Observer; Matt Mulhern as Dennis; Carrie Keranen as Kate Harper; Carolyn Feldschuh as Woman; Sandra Daley as Dr. Winick; Jimmy Palumbo as Mike; Chad Gittens as Agent; Phil Nee as Archie

Episode chronology
← Previous "Ability"	Next → "Unleashed"
- Fringe season 1

"Inner Child" is the 15th episode of the first season of the American science fiction drama television series Fringe, and the fifteenth episode overall. The episode was written by co-producer Brad Caleb Kane and staff writer Julia Cho and directed by filmmaker Frederick E. O. Toye. It first aired in the United States on April 7, 2009 on the Fox Broadcasting Company.

The episode relates the intersecting stories of a subterranean feral child looked after by Olivia Dunham (Anna Torv) and the return of a serial killer from her time before joining the Fringe Division.

== Plot ==
A demolition team is about to bring down a building when one worker is drawn to an area not marked on the blueprints. Inside the area they find a path to the building's foundation, and in the darkness, a boy (Spencer List). The boy is taken to a children's hospital, and the Fringe division is notified. The construction workers who examined the location where the boy was discovered found that it had been sealed off for seventy years and were unable to determine how the boy had entered. The boy does not speak, and Walter Bishop (John Noble) explains some of his medical conditions as a result of living underground for several years. Olivia Dunham (Anna Torv) seems to be the only person that the boy reacts to, and she helps to coax him to help in his treatment. At one point, she encourages him to eat by sharing candy with him, but he only places the yellow pieces in the form of an arrow for her.

Meanwhile, Charlie Francis (Kirk Acevedo) receives a fax, which he recognizes as a taunting invitation from the serial killer the Artist (Jeremy Shamos), who kills women and "displays" them in gruesome poses. Charlie contacts Olivia at the hospital requesting her help, but as she takes notes, the boy attempts to take her writing tools. Olivia gives them to the boy, and he writes, upside down, a name. Olivia and Charlie, along with other agents, later find the body of the Artist's latest victim, who has the same name that the boy wrote down earlier. Later, the boy provides an address, and Olivia and Charlie race to the location, but this time find nothing. Only later do they learn that a second victim was taken from that spot moments before they arrived. Walter comes to believe the boy has an empathic connection to the case.

Walter seeks to use a neural stimulator to understand the boy's empathy, but Peter only allows it after Walter devises less invasive methods. Though the child's mind is difficult to understand, they obtain a third location. Olivia, Charlie, and other agents set up a roadblock in the area and check all vehicles going through it. Olivia spies a van with a yellow tree-shaped air freshener, and recalling the child's candy display from earlier, determines that the Artist is inside. The killer attempts to escape, and Olivia stabs him to death with his own knife during the struggle.

Olivia and Broyles arrange the transfer of the child to an adopting family, in large part to keep him away from Eliot Michaels (Erik Palladino), an alleged “social worker” who wants to claim him for CIA research. While in transit to his new home, the boy makes eye contact with the Observer, September (Michael Cerveris), with whom he shares a resemblance.

== Production ==
The episode was written by co-producer Brad Caleb Kane and staff writer Julia Cho and directed by filmmaker Frederick E. O. Toye. It was Kane and Cho's third contributions to the series and Toye's fourth.

Ari Graynor and Lily Pilblad guest starred as Rachel Dunham and her daughter Ella. The episode also featured guest stars Spencer List as the Child, Jeremy Shamos as the Artist, Erik Palladino as Eliot Michaels, Victor Williams as Phil, Alicia Goranson as Samantha Gilmore, Matt Mulhern as Dennis, Sandra Daley as Dr. Winick, Jimmy Palumbo as Mike, and Phil Nee as Archie.

== Cultural references ==
Peter shows the feral boy an action figure of the G.I. Joe character Roadblock, and comments that he always remembers the character as having a scar on the other side of his face. This may be an early indication of differences that Peter remembers from his childhood in the parallel universe.

== Reception ==
=== Ratings ===
"Inner Child" was the first episode to air after a two-month hiatus. It was delayed by about 30 minutes because American Idol ran long for the night. The episode won its ad-hoc 9:30–10:30 Eastern timeslot, with about 9.6 million live viewers and a 9 share among viewers 18–49. Fringe also helped Fox win the night in total number of viewers. When asked by a reporter if he was "infuriated" with Fox because of the Idol-induced delay, co-creator J. J. Abrams replied "I will say that I have a different opinion about the network, but I, too, have heard from a number of people [about the issue]. It is infuriating".

=== Reviews ===
Jo Garfein at TV Overmind gave the episode a positive preview, saying, "This episode has more of an early X-Files feel, in a good way... To those of you who have either given up on the series or are on the fence, I recommend that you give Fringe another try. If 'Inner Child' is any indication, we are in for a very satisfying and engaging journey for the rest of the season." Alan Sepinwall's review in The Star-Ledger was overall positive, "As far as the episode as a whole goes, I thought it was fairly solid procedural hour of 'Fringe.' No, it didn't follow up on any of the revelations from 'Ability,' but it also didn't feature any of Agent Harris, and both the serial killer case and Olivia's rapport with the kid were compelling enough that I can wait on the mythology stuff for later." Jane Boursaw at TV Squad rated the episode very highly in her recap, and also mooted a theory about the Child, "My theory is that the boy is another Observer. They certainly looked a lot alike, didn't they? Could the boy have come from another dimension and ended up beneath the building? And why did the CIA guy say that they'd found 'another one.'" Apparently, they're keeping track of these creatures or Observers. And if so, where are the others?"

Noel Murray of The A. V. Club gave the episode qualified approval with a B rating. According to Murray, "The serial killer stuff in 'Inner Child was fairly pat—with elements swiped wholesale from Thomas Harris and Michael Connelly—and the 'keep Lil’ O away from Eliot' operation struck me as a little sloppy, if not actively implausible. But the episode was fast-paced and creepy, with a few good Walter lines (my favorite being a tie between 'Agent Dunham knows what a penis looks like' and 'obviously I was sitting on the toilet') and the return of his wonderfully ridiculous mad scientist device, 'the neural stimulator.'"
