= The Day We Died =

- Fringe episode
- In a critical scene near the end of the episode, Peter's inexplicable disappearance is not noticed by the others. The plot point was a popular point of interest among critics.
- Episode no.: Season 3 Episode 22
- Directed by: Joe Chappelle
- Story by: J. H. Wyman; Jeff Pinkner; Akiva Goldsman
- Teleplay by: Jeff Pinkner; J. H. Wyman
- Production code: 3X6122
- Original air date: May 6, 2011

Guest appearances
- Emily Meade as Ella Dunham; Brad Dourif as Moreau; Mark Wynn as Oscar; Michael Cerveris as September; Eugene Lipinski as December

Episode chronology
← Previous "The Last Sam Weiss"	Next → "Neither Here nor There"
- Fringe season 3

"The Day We Died" is the third season finale of the Fox science fiction drama television series Fringe. It is the season's 22nd episode and the series' 65th episode overall. The finale follows the aftermath of Peter Bishop entering and activating the doomsday device, events which took place in the previous episode. He finds himself 15 years in the future; though the device has destroyed the parallel universe, his universe is nevertheless gradually disintegrating. Peter comes to realize the background of the doomsday device and wakes up in 2011. After getting the two universes to agree to work together, he inexplicably disappears.

The episode's teleplay was co-written by Jeff Pinkner and J.H. Wyman, and co-wrote the story along with consulting producer Akiva Goldsman. Executive producer Joe Chappelle served as director. The writers wrote the script without knowing if the series was going to be renewed for a fourth season; Fox's renewal announcement came in late March, but no changes were made to the storyline. They designed the episode as a set-up for the following season, equating it to a book chapter that "propels" the reader forward. Unlike previous season finales, "The Day We Died" was one hour long and was linked to the previous two episodes in one continuous story arc. "The Day We Died" featured one-time guest actors Brad Dourif and Emily Meade.

"The Day We Died" aired on May 6, 2011 in the United States to an estimated 3.0 million viewers, though this number almost doubled once time-shifted views were taken into account. While its 1.4 ratings share among adults 18 to 49 was an eight percent decrease from the previous episode, it helped Fox tie for first place that night. Reviews of the episode have been generally positive, with many critics writing that Peter's disappearance was a good direction for the series. Multiple reviewers ranked it as one of the best episodes of the television season, including The Futon Critic and TV.com. The cast were also receptive to the episode, and actor John Noble submitted his performance for consideration at the 63rd Primetime Emmy Awards.

== Plot ==
In May 2026, the prime universe is suffering from the same singularities that have already destroyed the parallel universe, as a result of the two universes being inextricably linked together. Though the Fringe Division that developed in this universe has been able to use amber to contain these vortices, a group called the "End of Dayers", led by a man named Moreau (Brad Dourif), attempts to breach the fabric of reality at soft spots and create more vortices. After one such incident at a theater, Peter and Olivia (Anna Torv), now married, along with Astrid (Jasika Nicole) and Ella (Emily Meade), Olivia's niece and now a rookie Fringe agent, find an unactivated container that they believe the End of Dayers used to trigger the breach. Fringe is unable to determine how the container works, and Peter convinces Broyles (Lance Reddick), now a senator, to allow him to release his father Walter (Noble), currently in maximum security prison as punishment for activating the doomsday device, to help identify its workings.

After tearfully reuniting with his son and new daughter-in-law, Walter discovers the device uses a unique radioactive signature that they can track. The strongest source points to a used campground, where Peter discovers a key. He recognizes the key as from Walter's old home near Reiden Lake and travels there alone, and finds his biological father, Walternate, present. Walternate admits to being behind the End of Dayers group, as his revenge for Peter activating the doomsday device and destroying the parallel world that was his home. Walternate promises that Peter will face the same pain and suffering he has faced since crossing to the prime universe on a mission of mercy, one piece at a time. Peter realizes that Walternate is implying a threat to Olivia, and finds that Walternate was speaking to him remotely through a holographic simulation. In Central Park, where Moreau has set off another breach to expose an existing wormhole, Olivia is helping to cordon off the breach when Walternate approaches and shoots her. Peter and the rest of Fringe division struggle with her death at her funeral.

Walter continues to study the Central Park wormhole and discovers that it links to the past, approximately 250 million years ago. He comes to realize a temporal paradox (a bootstrap paradox): he will have sent the doomsday device piece by piece into the past, effectively becoming the "First People" mythos, and convinces Peter that they can influence Peter in the past by having him experience the end of days himself and make a different decision when he enters the machine.

Peter suddenly wakes up to find himself in the machine in 2011, only one minute since he entered it, and Olivia waiting by his side; concurrently, in the parallel universe, Walternate attempts to convince Fauxlivia to help stop the machine. Peter recalls the memories from the future, and uses the machine to merge the machine rooms from both universes into one thus creating a bridge. While Olivia and Walter and their doppelgangers stare each other down, Peter convinces the two sides to work together to try to repair the damage to save both universes, then suddenly disappears. The Olivias and Walters cautiously agree that they need to put aside their differences to save both worlds, apparently unaware of Peter's disappearance. Outside on Liberty Island in the prime universe, the Observers watch as September (Michael Cerveris) notes to December (Eugene Lipinski) that Peter has already been forgotten by his friends, his purpose having been served, and explains that Peter now never existed.

== Production ==
=== Casting ===
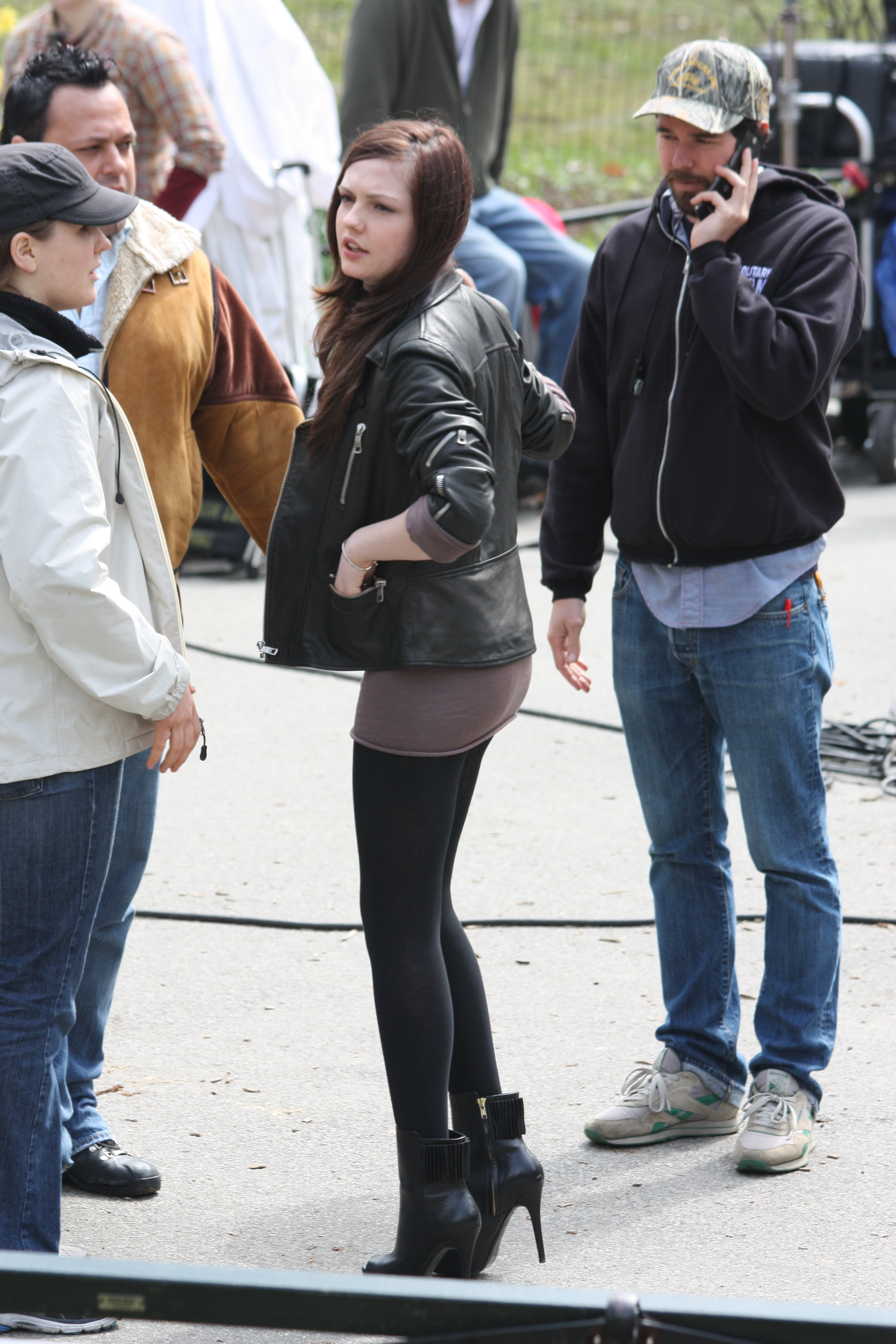
Actress Emily Meade (center) appeared in the finale as a grown-up version of Ella Dunham, now a rookie FBI agent.

Despite the show not yet being officially renewed for a fourth season, Fringe began casting in mid-March for a "green FBI agent... to come aboard for the finale and possibly recur next year", as reported by E! Online. TVLine's Michael Ausiello announced later in the month that actress Emily Meade has been cast for the role, describing her character as "a wide-eyed and eager rookie who’s ready to face all of the challenges in front of her", and that she would make her first appearance in the finale. In the months leading up to the finale, Wyman responded to reports the character would be recurring by calling her casting more of a "safety net"; much like Seth Gabel's casting, he did not want to commit himself to her character yet, saying, "We always protect ourselves by saying that because you never know". The actress was later revealed to be playing a grown up version of Olivia's niece, Ella.

Another casting call for the finale was released, as the show began looking for a "well-known male Japanese actor in his late 40s to late 50s who speaks English" to appear as a new character called "Moreau". Despite the casting call's description, they later cast American actor Brad Dourif for the part. On whether Dourif would be returning, executive producer J.H. Wyman commented in a May 2011 interview, "Brad is such a fantastic actor. We are keeping our options open".

=== Writing ===
Co-showrunners Jeff Pinkner and J.H. Wyman co-wrote the episode's teleplay, and co-wrote the story with consulting producer Akiva Goldsman. Executive producer Joe Chappelle served as director. A full season renewal of Fringe was announced on March 24, 2011. They had written the finale without knowing if there would be another season, but decided not to make any changes to the script even after hearing of its renewal. Pinkner explained that "we wrote the episode, perhaps foolishly, assuming that we would be on for Season 4. We never for one second entertained that it would be the end of the series. So therefore, we didn't have to change a word!" In an interview with the New York Post, Pinkner warned that events in the finale will "unfurl in a very unexpected way for the characters and the audience". He also commented that the finale "hopefully will make you sort of revisit and look at everything that's happened all year through a fresh pair of glasses".

"We loved the idea of going into the future and back again, because it allowed us to inform the present of the show with some thematic elements. So if we feel that we need an element of that future to enhance the drama in the present, we’re going to tell that story. Going forward, that glimpse of the future will be part of the tapestry of Fringe, but don’t expect to [go] there a lot. But what we know now — and this is the important part — is that our world is going to break down. That’s what’s waiting for us. I think the fans should be like: 'That’s not a future we should be interested in getting to.'"

— Executive producer J.H. Wyman on whether the future depicted is still going to happen

Pinkner stated in another interview that it "will be as much as anything about setting up next season," and Wyman agreed, writing "It’s like when you read a great novel and you finish a chapter, you’re like, 'Oh my gosh, something happened that’s going to propel me forward!' That’s something we desire to emulate." In March 2011, Pinkner confirmed with TVLine that unlike previous Fringe season finales, the third season's finale would not be two hours long. He did however note that "the last three episodes will be linked in one continuous story arc."

The cast was receptive to the finale storyline. In an interview with Entertainment Weekly, actor John Noble noted he liked how the story ultimately ended with having the two Walters "perhaps negotiate a truce and put their minds together" through a "very inventive intervention by Peter, who basically took control of destiny and forced his two fathers to look each other in the eye, as if telling them: Sort it out, gentlemen.'" He later noted, "We finish [the finale] in a very dramatic place." Joshua Jackson praised the role-reversal of his character with Walter's, "You had Peter wracked with guilt over the circumstances tied to the decision he made [to activate The First People's so-called "doomsday" machine] and clinging to hope that there might be some way out. I can’t have made a cosmically bad decision! There must be some way to put this right! Which is fascinating, because that’s basically been Walter for as long as we’ve known him. So I loved how Peter ceases to be so stubborn when it comes to Walter, comes to understand him and even begins to see things the way he does."

The finale contained a new, grey credit sequence that was meant to reflect the new timeline. It contained new scientific words such as "Thought Extraction" and "Dual Maternity", as well as "Water" and "Hope". Wyman explained their reasoning for the change, "[The credits] weren’t so much pertinent to the finale but for the introduction of the future of the show. In the past, we used words in the credit sequence as signposts for the episode. But this is a new paradigm."

After the finale aired, Pinkner stated in an interview that "one of the things we love to play with is the notion of choice versus fate/synchronicity. Clearly, what Peter did at the end of that episode is that he fundamentally changed the future. Our team is [now] on a separate path. It is unlikely that we’ll get to that specific outcome in 2026. But are events like what happened in Detroit inevitable in any version of the future? TBD."

=== Marketing ===
Leading up to the episode's broadcast, Fox released a promotional trailer that recapped relevant scenes and previewed events in the finale. Fox had previously produced similar trailers for "Entrada", "Marionette", and "Bloodline", three episodes from earlier in the season. As with other Fringe episodes, Fox released a science lesson plan in collaboration with Science Olympiad for grade school children, focusing on the science seen in "The Day We Died", with the intention of having "students learn about reverse engineering and disassembling devices."

== Reception ==
=== Ratings ===
The finale first aired on the Fox network in the United States on May 6, 2011. It was watched by an estimated 3.0 million viewers. It scored a 1.2/4 ratings share among viewers 18–49, an 8 percent decrease from the previous week's episode. The finale and its lead-in, Kitchen Nightmares, did however help Fox tie for first place in that demographic with ABC and CBS. The rating for this episode almost doubled when DVR time shifted viewing was taken into account. Because of its comparatively low live ratings, SFScope columnist Sarah Stegall speculated that only "the core of the core audience" watched the episode, as "no outsiders could have possibly fathomed what went on in that 45 minutes."

=== Reviews ===
"The Day We Died" has generally received positive reviews from television critics. Sam McPherson from TV Overmind graded the finale with an A, writing "From a show known for its mindbending episodes came the most mindbending episode of all. 'The Day We Died'... not only reinvigorated the show's fantastic (but inevitably aging) premise, but gave the show a breath of life that has me waiting -- no, begging -- for the show's fourth season." Though he wouldn't call the finale the best Fringe episode yet, McPherson referred to the season as the best of the three and "probably the best season of television that's aired in recent years". Entertainment Weekly's Ken Tucker lauded the finale, commenting in his review's conclusion "Consider about the whole arc of this season and tell me this wasn’t one of the most moving, thrilling, funny, inspiring chunks of television you’ve watched. The performances by Noble, Torv, and Jackson were extraordinarily adroit, never showy or merely clever. I was so glad that, by season’s end, Jackson/Peter had once again taken center-stage — a central importance — to a season that, by the nature of its design, needed to concentrate a lot on Walter(s) and Olivia(s)."

"The Fringe writers just turned the whole series on its head. Everything we thought we knew just got thrown out the proverbial window. This isn't just a new chapter, it's a whole new book. The new story opportunities here are endless."

— IGN reviewer Ramsey Isler

IGN's regular Fringe reviewer Ramsey Isler rated the episode 8/10. He compared the plot to Lost, remarking "Apparently one thoroughly confusing and unnecessarily convoluted TV series wasn't enough... But hey, I understand why J.J. and his Fringe collaborators... might have done this. They had kind of written themselves into a corner where one of the universes had to go, and they couldn't stretch that storyline out forever. A restart like this is a good way to allow themselves room to write something new, even if it may require some clever thinking to explain themselves out of this situation adequately." Isler had trouble rating the finale, noting that he had to see how the events are explained in the fourth season before he can make a complete judgment.

Noel Murray from The A.V. Club graded the finale with a B+; he praised the writers "for once again introducing a new world that feels fully formed, with its own rich backstory that they could choose to explore if they have the time and the inclination." Murray concluded his review, "It may be that Fringe has bitten off more than it can chew here, and the storytelling is about to get hopelessly convoluted, as it often does once time-travel enters the picture. But for now, I’m going to enjoy living with and thinking over what I’ve seen so far. And I’m going to trust that no matter how crazy Fringe's fourth season gets, the writers are going to keep bringing everything back to less mind-bending questions". Some reviewers questioned the logic of Peter having never existed, though others expressed their trust in the writers' ability to make it work.

The Futon Critic and TV.com staff highlighted "The Day We Died" as one of the best television episodes of the 2010–11 United States network television schedule. Likewise, Give Me My Remote contributor Marisa Rothman ranked "The Day We Died" one of the best episodes of the year, explaining "Between Walter's eventual reunion with his loved ones and Olivia's tragic demise, few episodes were as heartbreaking as 'The Day We Died'...not to mention, no episode shocked me as much with a plot twist. (I literally bolted up in my seat when Peter vanished into thin air after creating a bridge between the universes.)" Entertainment Weekly included the episode's ending in their list of television's best cliffhangers of 2011, and later named it the sixteenth best episode of the series. Time gave "The Day We Died" an honorable mention on their list of the best episodes of the season.

=== Awards and nominations ===
At the 63rd Primetime Emmy Awards, John Noble submitted "The Day We Died", along with "Entrada" and "The Firefly", for consideration in the Outstanding Supporting Actor in a Drama Series category, but did not receive a nomination. At the 2012 Golden Reel Awards, "The Day We Died" received nominations in the categories "Best Sound Editing: Short Form Sound Effects and Foley in Television" and "Best Sound Editing: Short Form Sound Effects and Foley in Television" from the Motion Picture Sound Editors. It lost in both categories, the former to the Raising Hope episode "Prodigy", the latter to the pilot episode of the HBO television series Game of Thrones.
