= Mythology of Fringe =

Aspect of US TV drama, 2008–2013

Fringe is an American science fiction drama television series originally broadcast from 2008 to 2013. The show, created by J. J. Abrams, Alex Kurtzman, and Roberto Orci, revolves around the fictional Fringe Division, a congressionally funded federal law enforcement task force, staffed primarily by Federal Bureau of Investigation and Homeland Security personnel. The task force is responsible for investigating crimes and phenomena related to fringe science and the individuals and conspiratorial organizations that perpetrate those acts. During the five-season series, the mythology and backstory of the show expanded across a broad spectrum of recurring themes (such as alternate realities and timelines), locations, and characters to serialize story arcs and intricately link early episodes with later ones.

== Massive Dynamic ==
Massive Dynamic is a fictional, multi-faceted conglomerate working for the advancement of weapons testing, robotics, medical equipment, aeronautics, genetics, pharmaceuticals, communications, energy, transportation, and entertainment technology. It was founded by William Bell in 1992 and is managed by Chief Operations Officer Nina Sharp, Bell's long-time friend, colleague, and occasional romantic interest. Upon Bell's death, the company ownership was bequeathed to Walter Bishop. However, when the timeline was rewritten, Walter Bishop did not gain ownership. Its home office is at 655 18th St., New York. In reality, the filming of the exterior of Massive Dynamic occurred at 7 World Trade Center. Charlie Francis estimated the company to be worth around $50 billion. The main headquarters in Manhattan was destroyed in 2036 by Walter Bishop, using an anti-matter device to avoid capture by Loyalists, and the highrise sublimated where it stood. According to Bell's testimony ("Over There, Part 2") to Walter, Massive Dynamic doesn't exist in the parallel universe; however, Bishop Dynamic did exist until at least 1985 ("Subject 13").

== Cortexiphan ==
Cortexiphan is a nootropic drug developed in the early 1980s, designed to enhance the mental abilities of the test subject, allowing them to tap into the 'infinite capability' of the human mind. Initial exposure to the drug as an adult can be lethal, so trials were performed on children in at least two locations, including a day-care center in Jacksonville, Florida, and at the Wooster Campus of Ohio State University. Testing continued through 1986. A young Olivia Dunham was a part of the Jacksonville trials while she was in the care of her mother and abusive stepfather.

The exact response to Cortexiphan varies from child to child. Manifested psionic abilities include telepathy, mind control, pyrokinesis, telekinesis, and the ability to transit the 'brane' [i.e., membrane] between universes. Cortexiphan also has slight regenerative abilities. Walter's tests, shown in the flashback episode "Subject 13", often required coaxing the child to demonstrate their powers through emotional stimuli; in the case of Olivia, he found it necessary to terrify her to bring about her powers.

Nineteen minor characters have been associated with the Cortexiphan Trials. The affected adults find they have weak bonds between each other. Some of their powers do not work on their fellow Cortexiphan patients while other abilities work only on Cortexiphan patients. Three of them reappear during the Season Two finale to aid Walter and Olivia to crossover to the parallel universe, but all three vanish, or die after their crossing.

During the first half of Season Three, where Olivia has been captured by Secretary Walter Bishop (dubbed 'Walternate') in the parallel universe, Walternate and his research lead Brandon to discover the presence of Cortexiphan—to them, an unknown substance—in Olivia's blood and attempt to recreate the drug. They discover that the drug is lethal to adults and Walternate refuses to let Brandon test the drug on children. They ultimately come to use Olivia again, dosing her with a synthetic mix that is able to articulate her abilities and allow her to cross universes again. Olivia later uses this synthetic mix to escape the parallel universe.

In Season Four, Olivia is dosed with Cortexiphan once again by the alternate Nina Sharp. This, along with her love for Peter Bishop, causes her memories from the original timeline to re-emerge. She is later activated by William Bell in his ultimate plan to destroy the two universes. Olivia's powers include controlling people in a "Jedi mind trick" kind of way and being able to safely cross between universes. Cortexiphan also plays a key role in helping Olivia achieve a key goal and outwit the Observers during the Season Five finale.

== The parallel universe ==
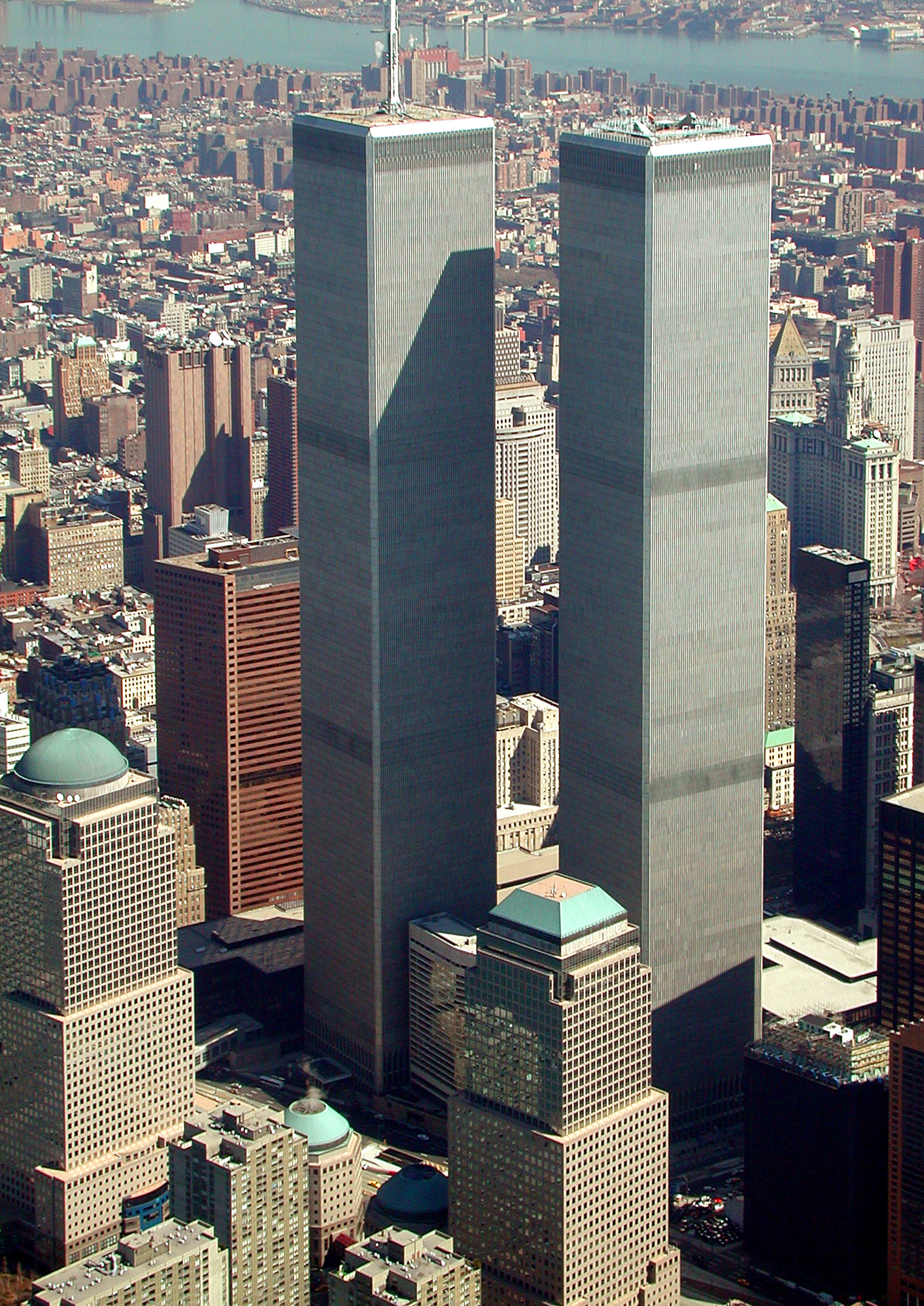
The World Trade Center towers were unaffected by the September 11th attacks in the parallel universe, leaving them as a landmark for the alternate world's Manhatan skyline.

While the show is based in the prime universe, several of the events are driven by the influence of the parallel universe. The existence of the parallel universe was postulated by Walter and William while under the influence of psychedelic drugs, and they were able to create a window-like device to observe the universe from their own. They later theorized ways of transporting objects from one universe to the other; one involves the use of frequency harmonics to send objects across at certain times, although through conservation of mass, an object of similar mass would be brought back some time later.

Within Fringe, the prime and parallel worlds are inexorably linked, hypothesized by the characters as the result of a divergent event in the past that formed the two universes. Quantum entanglement of objects between the two universes is significant, having been shown as part of the function of the doomsday device and an electric typewriter used to communicate between universes. The parallel universe appears more technologically advanced than the prime one: the Statue of Liberty does not have its patina of verdigris, Gaudi's Hotel Attraction is depicted as a completed structure, and zeppelins are seen to be a common form of transportation. In the keystone second-season episode "Peter", which takes place primarily in 1985, the parallel universe is shown to have cell phones. In the show's present of 2009 and onward, John F. Kennedy is an ambassador to the United Nations; other figures such as John Lennon, Len Bias, and Martin Luther King Jr. are also alive. The United States consists of 48 states; there exists the states of both North and South Texas, while the Carolinas are a single unified state. Furthermore, much of western California has been lost, suggesting that a large earthquake along the San Andreas Fault has caused much of the coastal region to sink below sea level. Other effects on a global scale have caused sheep to become extinct, and made coffee and avocados valuable rarities. The singularities that plague the parallel universe can lead to destructive voids; to prevent these, the Fringe division there uses a fast-setting amber-like substance to prevent weakened areas from expanding catastrophically at the cost of the lives if those that become trapped within it. A mass blight has affected vast areas of plant life, such as the area around Boston. In the parallel September 11 attacks, the damage to the Pentagon was much more extensive; additionally,the flight hijacking targeting the White House succeeded, while the hijackings targeting the World Trade Center did not; . Other changes exist in the parallel universe's popular culture; Eric Stoltz stars in Back to the Future, the longest-running Broadway musical is titled Dogs (a play on Cats), and the Sherlock Holmes books were never written. In the universe's superhero comics, the Green Lantern is named the Red Lantern, The Dark Knight Returns is rather The Man of Steel Returns, and The Death of Superman was instead The Death of Batman. A radio broadcast in the episode "6:02 AM EST" of the Dodgers versus the Expos at Ebbets Field suggests that Major League Baseball's Montreal Expos and Brooklyn Dodgers remain extant.

== Doppelgängers ==
A common theme of the show is "there's more than one of everything", and this comes about in a number of doppelgänger-like characters that are part of the parallel universe.

- Olivia's counterpart has been named by the prime universe characters as "Fauxlivia", borrowing from fan-based names. A member of the parallel Fringe team, Fauxlivia is a redhead and more confident, personable, and a better marksman than Olivia. Prior to the third season, she had a boyfriend named Frank who worked for the Centers for Disease Control, but he left her after discovering her pregnancy by Peter.
- Walter's counterpart is "Walternate", a name given by Walter himself. Though his life was similar to Walter's prior to Peter's abduction, Walternate became resolved to get his son back. He is the United States Secretary of Defense and directly in charge of the parallel Fringe team.
- Lincoln Lee is first introduced as a brash lead agent in the parallel universe's Fringe team; his prime universe counterpart is a quieter agent for the FBI that comes to encounter a Fringe case.

Some counterparts have already met their demise. Peter is the Peter of the parallel universe, abducted by Walter to replace his Peter after he had succumbed to a childhood illness. William Bell asserted that his parallel universe self was killed in a car accident while a young boy. Colonel Broyles of the parallel universe is killed while giving Olivia time to escape to the prime universe (but then reappears when the timeline is rewritten in the fourth season). The alternate Lincoln Lee is also killed by a new hybrid shapeshifter in late season four. Other smaller characters are also alive on one side and deceased on the other as both Peter's and Olivia's mothers are dead in the prime universe but alive on the other side.

== The Pattern ==
The Pattern is a key element from the first season of the show. In trying to track down David Robert Jones, Olivia discovers that a large number of events studied by the Fringe division point to the fictional Reiden Lake in New York. Walter later identifies this epicenter as the weak spot between universes, created by him in 1985.

When Walter's son Peter died from a genetic disease in the prime universe, Walter had discovered that Walternate had found a cure for his own Peter but was distracted by an Observer at the critical moment. Walter recreated the cure, and used an untested means of crossing over at Reiden Lake, intending to give the cure to Peter and leave. Due to an attempt by Nina Sharp to stop him from using the untested device, Walter lost the cure, and instead brought Peter back to the prime universe to administer a new batch, intending to return the child. Walter reveals that his untested device shattered the fabric of reality between the two universes, and was the source for the Pattern and other smaller epicenters in the prime universe and even larger fringe events on the other side.

== The "last great storm" ==
The "last great storm" is a concept attributed to William Bell by Nina Sharp in "Momentum Deferred" with regard to the two parallel universes and the likelihood that one or the other would be destroyed once the doorway between them was opened. The conflict, a product of the Pauli exclusion principle, means that no two objects can occupy the same space at the same time, which arises as a direct result of Walter's initial abduction of Peter from the parallel universe. As shown in the events of "Subject 13", Walternate is unable to explain how his son had disappeared despite being the United States Security Czar, and only when young Olivia temporarily enters the parallel universe under emotional stress does he come to realize its existence. From a sketchbook given to him by Olivia, he realizes Peter has been taken over there, and with new resolve, vows to recover his son. This leads to Walternate's creation of the shapeshifters that can cross between the two universes to act as his agents in the prime universe. His actions are further spurred by the damage of Walter's crossing, creating numerous singularities that tear at the parallel universe's fabric of reality.

According to Nina, William had warned her that the "great storm" would cause one of the two universes to be completely destroyed by the other. Such events are shown to come to pass in the future Peter witnesses while using the Machine in "The Day We Died", in which the parallel universe had been fully obliterated by the singularities. To try to stave off this occurrence, Peter uses the Machine to create a bridge between the two universes to allow both sides to work together to avoid this result.

Yet another great storm, if not the original one, appears in season four when David Robert Jones (alive in the adjusted timeline) tries to destroy the universes through use of the Cortexiphan subjects and by other means. It reaches its climax when it is discovered that William Bell is the mastermind. He activates Olivia to destroy the two universes to create a universe of his own design. However, this plan is stopped when Walter shoots Olivia, thereby killing her and stopping her from being the source of the destruction.

== ZFT ==
ZFT, an acronym for the German phrase Zerstörung durch Fortschritte der Technologie, literally translated as "Destruction through Advancement of Technology", is a cult-like group of agents working to open a gateway between the two universes regardless of the cost, and are featured as the primary antagonists in the first season. The cult follows the ZFT manifesto, a document describing how to open a gateway between universes, apparently written by Walter before his period at the mental institution. Though by the show's present, Walter has forgotten much of the science behind this, it is revealed that William Bell purposely cut away pieces of Walter's brain to make him forget how to cross universes.

The cult is led by David Robert Jones (Jared Harris), a former biochemist from Massive Dynamic. Though during the first season, Jones was incarcerated in a German prison, his agents are able to recover a teleportation device created by Walter to extract Jones from prison. The Fringe division discover that Jones and ZFT are behind many of the events that form the Pattern, and use it to discover Reiden Lake, a weak spot between the universes where Jones is attempting to cross over. Fringe is able to stop ZFT in time, killing Jones when he is trapped part-way through the portal when it is closed.

In the alternate timeline, because of the absence of Peter, Jones was able to complete his journey to the alternate universe, and has since started constructing a new type of shapeshifter that has infiltrated both the prime and parallel universe, including high-level positions such as Walternate's chief scientist, Brandon. He has also blackmailed Colonel Broyles with the cure for his son's disease in order to control the parallel fringe division. With his agents' help, Jones has collected a significant quantity of a mineral called "amfilocite", which has enough explosive power to blast a hole between universes. Jones is also shown working with the parallel universe's Nina Sharp on a project involving dosing Olivia with cortexiphan in order to activate her and destroy the two universes. Other parts of this plan involve merging portions of the two universes (via amfilocite) and creating genetically modified creatures to inhabit Jones' new universe. In the end, it is revealed William Bell was the mastermind and was presumably the true head of ZFT. David Robert Jones is then killed by Olivia (as his death was a necessary sacrifice), and his pawns (alternate Nina Sharp and alternate Broyles) are caught. Bell's plan of destruction is stopped when Walter shoots and kills Olivia causing the destruction to cease as she was the power source.

== Shapeshifters ==
Shapeshifters are human-machine hybrids created by Walternate (and partially by William Bell) in the parallel universe in order to cross between the universes via dangerous and orthodox means. Due to their hybrid nature, their blood contains high levels of the element mercury. Often, their blood's silver hue is the only way to distinguish them from true humans. Upon arrival in the Prime Universe, they appear in a shapeless, flesh form until they can extract the features of a human using a special device. The device works only once it is connected to both the shapeshifter's mouth palate and a human's. The process, while allowing the shapeshifter to take the human's form, ultimately kills the human. This device is necessary to maintaining their humanoid form; without it, they can prolong their appearance for a short time by digesting mercury.

Shapeshifters are able to stay as sleeper agents for indefinite periods of time; in one case, a shapeshifter raised a family until he was called into action. Each shapeshifter carries a data disc located at the base of its spinal column to contain encoded information regarding its mission. Shapeshifter agents communicate with the parallel universe using a Selectric 251 typewriter located in secret room in a typewriter repair shop that is quantum entangled with an equivalent typewriter in the parallel universe.

In the fourth-season premiere episode, "Neither Here Nor There", a new type of shapeshifter was introduced. Similar to Walternate's versions, they are human-machine hybrids, including a bio-mechanical device similar to the data disc found in Walternate's versions. These shapeshifters require components from the blood of human victims that suffer from heavy metal poisoning to maintain themselves, otherwise exhibiting translucent skin. In "Novation", they are described as being even more human-like than Walternate's versions and being able to switch between every identity they've ever taken, making detection of them nearly impossible without invasive surgery to locate the data disc. "Enemy of My Enemy" shows these shapeshifters to be of David Robert Jones' creation, with a goal to infiltrate the highest levels of government to help execute his plans.

== Amber ==
Due to Walter's crossing, the parallel universe (and the prime universe, to some extent) suffers from weaknesses in the fabric of space-time, which create gravitational singularities. "Amber 31422" is a gaseous mixture deployed over an area which solidifies to seal off these weaknesses. Living creatures are entrapped inside the solid, like "an insect trapped in amber".

Amber is believed to have been developed originally by Walternate. Extensive quantities of amber have been used: notable examples include the entire area around Madison Square Garden ("Over There"), and a large portion of the city of Boston ("Over There", "Entrada"). The use of amber is an emergency protocol, placing the protection of their universe over the lives of innocents trapped within the "quarantine zone" before the amber is released ("Over There"). In the episode "Amber 31422", Walternate reveals that those trapped in the amber are still alive, a fact kept secret from the public to prevent civil unrest. Furthermore, in the same episode, it is shown that the amber has devices placed around it for the purpose of self-healing; cutting into the amber will cause it to reset to retain its structural properties.

In the prime universe, the use of amber was introduced in the first-season episode, "The Ghost Network", where it was used aboard a bus. Massive Dynamic retained a sample of this amber and developed a synthetic equivalent by the time of the third-season episode "6B", and aided Walter and the Fringe division to create a release system as a last resort to stop a developing singularity. In the future vision experienced by Peter in "The Day We Died", amber has been used in several areas, including in Central Park. In another alternate future seen in "Letters of Transit" and later season five episodes, Walter, Astrid, Peter, Olivia, and William Bell deliberately place themselves in an updated version of the amber, placing them in suspended animation. This new amber is more structurally sound than the previous types, and while it can be restored to its previous gaseous state, which is used to free Walter, Astrid, Peter, and later Olivia, the effect only lasts a few seconds before it reverts to its solid form.

Amber is likely one of several of the show's references to Roger Zelazny's Chronicles of Amber, a series of science-fiction/fantasy books in which characters travel between alternate universes. There is a Zelazny Building in Fringe's parallel universe, and the Pattern is a key element in the books, as well as the first season of the show.

== The Wave Synch Device ==
Introduced in "Over There", the Machine, or Wave Synch Device, is referred to as a doomsday device constructed from numerous components that, in the prime universe, were hidden across the globe, the coordinates encoded in the broadcast of various numbers stations. The First People books claim that the Machine was constructed by the First People, and has the power to destroy or create universes. Machines exist in both universes, and appear to only react to Peter; both universes possess a drawing that show Peter's eyes flaring out while using the Machine. They are connected through quantum entanglement, meaning that certain events that affect one machine will affect the other, such as its activation.

In the alternate universe, Walternate uses his resources as the US Secretary of Defense to actively search for the pieces of the Machine, believing that it can be used to heal the decay that his universe is suffering from. However, he is unable to recover all of its pieces, and thus resorts to sending Fauxlivia over to the prime universe as a spy in order to recover a critical piece of the prime universe machine. Without Peter to power the machine, Walternate is forced to use an alternative source, in the form of blood from Peter and Fauxlivia's infant son, which he uses to successfully activate the machine.

This does not result in the desired effect. The activation of the alternate universe machine causes the prime universe to accelerate its already-beginning decay, while doing nothing to halt the decay of the alternate universe. It also causes the prime universe machine to activate a force-field to protect itself; it violently repels any object, including Peter when he attempts to access it. Sam Weiss later claims that this is because the machine is "frustrated", believing Peter to already be inside it when he was not, and acting to protect him from danger. He also claims that this is causing it to act like a doomsday device, when in fact it is not.

In order to access their version of the Machine, Sam and Olivia later recovered an ancient box which reputedly held the "Crowbar", but actually contained a drawing of Olivia in the same style as the drawing of Peter, revealing that Olivia is the "Crowbar". Her telekinesis is revealed to be able to allow her to turn off the other side's machine which allows Peter to enter the Prime machine.

Once Peter enters it, he has a vision of 2026. In this timeline, Peter's use of the Machine caused the destruction of the alternate universe, but did nothing to halt the decay of the prime universe, which is now decaying at much the same rate its double had been fifteen years previously. This vision allows Peter to realize the true nature of the Machine, and he uses it to merge the two rooms holding both Machines into one, creating a bridge between the prime and alternate universes, so that travel can be much more simple between the two, hoping that they can work together to save their prospective worlds. However, afterwards Peter is erased from existence by the Observers due to the fact that he served his purpose.

Despite the fact that this action created an alternate timeline, the bridge remains opens for most of season four until the two universes are forced to close it due to David Robert Jones trying to use it to destroy them both.

== First People ==
The First People are a mythos introduced in the third-season episode "6955 kHz". They describe what Walter and other characters on the show believe to be a race of intelligent beings who existed before the mass extinction event, responsible for the construction of the Machine. In the prime universe, an ancestor of Sam Weiss (played by Kevin Corrigan), Samuel Weiss I, in the late 1800s discovered the manuscript which gave clues about the First People and the Machine, which he had published in several different languages under pseudonyms that were anagrams of his name, such as "Seamus Wiles". However, Samuel Weiss I left out a key element of the manuscript, which gave more details of the machine, and included the location of an object known as the "Crowbar", which could be used to penetrate the machine's defenses once Peter entered it. William Bell had collected the five First People texts and recognized Sam Weiss as the descendant of the author, and requested Nina Sharp to treat him as a special adviser in these matters.

In "The Day We Died", it is revealed that the First People are future versions of Walter and some others including Astrid and Ella, having sent the deconstructed Machine through a wormhole in New York City to the far-distant past. He further left sufficient clues—the coordinates of the Machine locations via the numbers stations, and the drawings of Peter and Olivia—for the Machine and its operation to be discovered in a bootstrap paradox. In "The Day We Died", the future Walter ensures that the Machine is loaded with a vision of their grim future that Peter in the past will experience, allowing Peter to make a different choice.

== Alternate timelines ==
The main timeline refers to the events of the first three seasons, involving the adult existence of Peter Bishop (portrayed by Joshua Jackson). When September (Michael Cerveris) erases Peter's existence by preventing his decision to save young Peter (Quinn Lord) from drowning in Reiden Lake as a child, a rewritten, alternate timeline emerges and is shown in the fourth season. The fifth season shows the futuristic dystopia of this timeline where the Observers take control.

The timeline without Peter showcases his importance to the voided lives of Walter and Olivia. When Peter re-emerges in the timeline, his influence restores their previous dynamic, though only Olivia eventually regains her memories in the episode "A Better Human Being" through the use of Cortexiphan. The episode "Anomaly XB-6783746" has Nina (Blair Brown) regain her memories from the touch of the Observer child before her suicide. The series finale, "An Enemy of Fate", later shows Walter also regain memories of his life with Peter before his sacrifice to be erased. A final timeline emerges at a fixed point in November 2015, after Walter goes to a prior timeline's 2167 with Michael (Rowen Longworth) to prevent the creation of the Observers, presumably with the exception of September for Walternate's distraction.

=== Prior time loops ===
The concept of multiple timelines is introduced in the flashback origin episode titled "Peter", set in 1985. The original timeline is suggested to be a version of reality where the Observer known as September (Michael Cerveris) never distracted 7-year-old Peter (Quinn Lord)'s scientist birth father, Walternate (John Noble) from curing his childhood illness to save his life.

The second known timeline of events refers to September's distraction. In this reality, as shown in the "Peter" episode, 7-year-old Peter was abducted in 1985 by his birth father's prime universe counterpart—in order to cure him (leading to the first three seasons of Fringe). The original outcome of this second timeline is shown in the final two episodes of the third season (which focused on the concurring war between the two universes in the year 2011). A 32-year-old Peter's consciousness is driven forward fifteen years in the closing moments of the season three penultimate episode "The Last Sam Weiss" after he steps into the machine—also known as the Doomsday device—in the prime universe.

When he steps into the machine, he is consciously pulled forward to the year 2026, showing the fate of the prime universe after the parallel universe is destroyed. This is subsequently revealed to be the future of a prior time loop of the show's first three seasons.

The subsequent episode, which serves as the season finale, "The Day We Died" shows 32-year-old Peter continue to experience his 47-year-old self's experiences in 2026, including the grief over future wife, Olivia Dunham's revenge-kill murder committed by his now-80-year-old birth father Walternate for the destruction of his universe back in 2011, once Peter stepped into the Machine in the prime universe.

Following Olivia's funeral, Peter's adoptive father, prime Walter, then reveals his intention to prevent his daughter-in-law's death by sending the Machine back in time—a decision he believes has already been made—but this time altering the Machine so that Peter's younger, 32-year-old self can consciously witness the decaying world of 2026 and impending doomsday (which is what 32-year-old Peter is already witnessing in the episode itself).

As Future Walter predicts, 32-year-old Peter—in this second known time loop—makes a different choice. He tears holes in both universes to create a bridge that will forms an alliance between the two universes. Therefore, the first three seasons of Fringe showcases—at least—the second known time loop of the reality where September distracted Walternate.

=== The timeline without Peter ===
After Peter forms the Bridge, September erases Peter from existence. He claims to the Observers he "never existed", though it is later clarified to mean his existence as an adult never occurred in this alternate timeline. After the producers reassured that Walter's crossover origin story remained intact, the episode "Novation" showcased the point of divergence in the timeline without Peter growing up. Peter discovers September did not pull him out of Reiden Lake following his kidnapping during the events of the second season flashback origin story episode "Peter", causing him to drown. This led to a butterfly effect of different choices and alternate histories for each character in both timelines.

Thus, Peter the boy (portrayed by Lord, and later Chandler Canterbury) never existed to become a man (portrayed by Jackson), and therefore, he "never existed" to experience the confrontation between the two universes during the Bridge alliance in the rewritten timeline (despite being responsible for the creation of the Bridge in the previous timeline which consisted of the first three seasons of Fringe).

The fourth season storyline showcased a re-emerged adult Peter reintegrating into the life of the other characters ("Subject 9" onwards) after September refuses to finish erasing him fully when he bleeds through again in fragments in the fourth season premiere "Neither Here nor There". Peter subsequently requests to be returned to "his" timeline, before discovering he is already "home" (albeit in remodelled form due to history rewritten in his absence) in the episode "A Short Story About Love" despite nobody remembering their history from the previous time loop. The exception of Olivia who regains her prior timeline memories fully in

September himself is unable to explain why fragments of Peter bled through in "The End of All Things", suggesting it to be the concept of love through emotional quantum entanglement, though reassured Peter he was important. He also explains that the timeline needed to be erased due to the existence of Henry Dunham, his son with Fauxlivia born in 2011, as he was born to the wrong Olivia Dunham, implying the child he will have with the prime universe version of Olivia would be the correct one.

The producers, Jeff Pinkner and Joel Wyman, stated this rewritten, Peterless timeline gave them the ability to revisit past events from earlier episodes, demonstrating how certain events still occurred but without the influence of Peter.

==== Changes ====
After September allowed Peter to drown, Elizabeth Bishop (Orla Brady) immediately committed suicide fifteen years earlier (mentioned in "The Man from the Other Side") in 1985 from the grief of losing her son twice (altered in "Back to Where You've Never Been"). Walter became mad with grief, wanting to destroy both universes to create his own idealized world acting as God ("Brave New World").

Walter still requested William Bell (Leonard Nimoy) remove pieces of his brain out of fear of who he was becoming (as seen in "Grey Matters", and mentioned in "Over There: Part 2"), but Bell took the idea on for himself anyway ("Brave New World: Part 2"). It is implied that Bell's intentions were always dubious in the original timeline, and his fate in the alternate timeline was merely incidental, hence why Junior Agent Amy Jessup (Meghan Markle) connected Fringe cases to the Bible, as Bell had been planning his own Noah's Ark. ("Night of Desirable Objects")

Olivia ran away from the Cortexiphan trials after six months according to "Subject 9", instead of connecting with Peter during the 1986 experiments to bring him home ("Subject 13"). Without opening up to Peter about her abuse, she still shot her abusive stepfather as a child ("The Cure") but finished him off in the new timeline ("One Night in October").

Walter hated Nina Sharp (Blair Brown) for the next 26 years; he blamed her for breaking the vial with the cure for Peter's disease—ultimately leading to the kidnapping and Peter's death ("Subject 9"); her subsequent guilt led her to gain guardianship of the Dunham sisters after Marilyn (Amy Madigan) died of cancer when Olivia and Rachel (Ari Graynor) were due to go into foster care ("Novation"). Following this, Olivia took on some of Nina's hobbies like horseback riding (seen in "The Cure") in her teenage years (seen in "Novation" and "Forced Perspective") while Rachel still met Greg and gave birth to Ella (Lily Pilblad), though their marriage remained intact and they had a second child named Eddie ("Nothing As It Seems"). "Brave New World: Part 2" reveals Senator Van Horn (Gerard Plunkett) was never replaced by a shapeshifter and is alive.

"Neither Here Nor There" shows that Olivia was able to release Walter from the mental institution without a living relative, instead of Peter originally ("Pilot"). However, without Peter, Walter has become reclusive and refuses to leave the laboratory. "Alone in the World" reveals monthly evaluations by the director of St. Claire's were a condition for Walter's release from the institution. The fourth season opener also reveals Walter was unable to save John Scott (Mark Valley) during the Flight 627 investigation, leaving Richard Steig (Jason Butler Harner)'s fate unknown in the rewritten timeline (as Scott killed him upon his recovery originally). Consequently, Astrid Farnsworth is a field agent to account for Walter's agoraphobia.

She had never crossed over to the parallel universe as her abilities were never enhanced or manipulated (as the initial experiments to try and send Peter home in 1986 never happened). ("Back to Where You've Never Been") Fauxlivia still took her place, as seen previously ("Over There: Part 2"), though Colonel Broyles never died as Olivia's brainwashing or Cortexiphan experiments were never conducted on her ("Entrada"). These events only occurred when Walternate became aware of her abilities from the Peter-influenced confession she made as a child ("Subject 13"), leaving the cases she solved in the parallel universe unresolved, such as predictive criminal Milo Stanfield (Michael Eklund). Another difference is Lincoln Lee (Seth Gabel)'s father is alive, after being previously being mentioned to have recently died in his first appearance ("Over There: Part 1").

Olivia was instead kidnapped by Fauxlivia in the prime universe ("One Night in October") and transported as a prison captive in the parallel universe for two weeks while Fauxlivia did espionage. ("Making Angels") "Back to Where You've Never Been" reveals Olivia is unaware of her ability to cross over (as initial experiments to try and send Peter home in 1986 never happened), also revealing she never sought treatment after her car accident from bowling alley attendant Sam Weiss (Kevin Corrigan), and as confirmed in the season five episode "Black Blotter", Olivia never met him in the alternate timeline.

"One Night in October" reveals Fauxlivia still lived with her boyfriend Frank (Philip Winchester) who had broken up with her after discovering she was pregnant with Peter's child ("Immortality"), though they later separated in the new timeline for undisclosed reasons ("The Consultant"). Meanwhile, Alternate Charlie married Mona Foster (Julie McNiven) from "Immortality" and was on honeymoon with her during the events of "One Night in October". Sally Clark (Pascale Hutton) and Nick Lane (David Call) are alive, having never crossed over to rescue Peter ("Worlds Apart"), but Lincoln was still blown up ("Everything In Its Right Place"), presumably due to a superhearing Olivia ("Night of Desirable Objects")'s absence to alert them of the bomb during Joshua Rose (Shawn Ashmore)'s apartment explosion ("Amber 31422"). Olivia also never met any Cortexiphan subjects as an adult until Cameron (Chadwick Boseman), meaning Nick was recruited by Jones earlier in the timeline than the events of "Bad Dreams".

Furthermore, without Peter, David Robert Jones (Jared Harris) successfully escaped into the parallel universe ("There's More Than One of Everything"), later appearing to cause havoc in both universes where he creates organic shapeshifters that appear human ("Back to Where You've Never Been"). Initially it is believed he crossed over to kill Bell, but it is revealed in "Brave New World: Part 1" he crossed over to impress him and become his protege.

== Observers ==
The Observers are hairless pale men that typically wear dark grey suits and fedora hats. They are quiet, tend to mind their own business, and interact only minimally with others. Appearing in every episode, they tend to appear before significant events in history. They use advanced equipment, such as advanced communication devices and compact binoculars, and they employ an alien written alphabet. A distinguishing trait is their diminished sense of taste, and it is often shown that they can only taste very spicy food. Observers also have diminished emotions.

The Observers are able to see future events, and they are able to travel in time and across universes without difficulty because of their advanced technology. In "The End of All Things", it is revealed that the group of Observers seen in the first four seasons are a team of scientists from the far future, or at least from one of humanity's many possible futures. This group of Observers traveled to their past to observe the events that led to their creation.

The Observers seen in the show during the first four seasons had designated code names, with each individual referred to as a month of the year: September (Michael Cerveris) appears in every episode in the first four seasons, even if only in a cameo shot, while December (Eugene Lipinski) and others appear with less frequency. In the episode named "August", a rogue Observer named August was shown (Peter Woodward) who sought to try to change the fate of a young woman contrary to the Observers' practice.

September is seen in both universes during the episode "Peter". He causes Walternate to miss a critical observation for the cure for Peter's illness in the parallel universe and to rescue Walter and Peter after they fell through the ice in the prime.

The episode "The Firefly" involves a series of events temporally engineered by September to force Walter to make a choice regarding Peter's safety as to prepare him for a future event. These events included bringing the son of Walter's favorite musician into the present to draw Walter's attention.

After Peter's disappearance in the third season's finale, "The Day We Died", the Observers remain aware that Peter has vanished, claiming he has been erased from existence.

The episode "Letters of Transit" reveals that by the year 2609, the Observers had wreaked environmental havoc on the Earth - to the point that they decided to simply travel back in time to the early 21st century and colonize the planet before the environmental destruction occurred. In the year 2015, the Observers invaded from the future, instituting "The Purge" and killing many humans. Although humans continued to resist well into the year 2036, the Observers largely succeeded in conquering the planet. The fifth season focuses on events in this future, where the Observers, run by Captain Windmark, maintain control on the remaining humans through their own abilities and the assistance of human Loyalists. A rogue group of humans, the Resistance, fight against the Observers, and have come to learn much about the Observers' abilities, including that many extend from an implant in the back of their neck that expands their mental processing power at the cost of emotions. Due to coming from a much more polluted Earth from six centuries in the future, the unpolluted atmosphere of 21st century Earth is too "clean" for Observers to live in for prolonged periods of time (or perhaps, simply uncomfortable): thus after conquering present-day Earth, the Observers set up terraforming factories to increase the level of carbon monoxide in the atmosphere, which will cut short the life expectancy of regular humans by decades.

In the episode "The Boy Must Live", September explains that the final emotionless version of the Observers were "born" out of an experiment performed by a Norwegian scientist in 2167. That scientist was the first scientist to replace space in the brain usually designated for negative human emotions, such as rage, with brain cells tuned to increase intellect. Many generations of humanity later, brain cells currently tuned for emotions (not just the bad ones but the good ones as well) were engineered to be intellectual brain cells. Higher and higher intelligence was the ultimate goal.

The experimenter modified human genes to displace certain emotional facilities for improved mental abilities, and the success of the experiment eventually led to the development of near-emotionless humans with high levels of intelligence that became humanity's evolutionary future - aka "the Observers." Without emotions, there was no urge to procreate, and thus the Observers developed technology to artificially grow new Observers using Observer DNA via maturation chambers.

During the out of body growth process, Observers were grown from embryo into fully matured adults. Sometimes, the growth process would create genetic anomalies; typically, the Observers would destroy any anomalies. The Observer September encountered one such anomaly - Anomaly XB-6783746 - and was affected when he learned he was the "genetic parent." September did not destroy his progeny but developed a strong desire to save his son - Anomaly XB-6783746 - after scans revealed that the Observer was even smarter than mature Observers while possessing all of the emotions sacrificed so easily starting in 2167. His son, later named "Michael" by human caretakers during the initial Earth invasion by the Observers- possessed both human emotions and Observer-level intelligence. September then hid the child in the early 21st century (which was humanity's future but centuries before September's time). The series' finale concluded with Walter's successful effort to transport "Michael" to 2167 to convince the Norwegian scientists to abandon any efforts for reproductive medicine which might involve sacrificing emotions. These emotions are the backbone of humanity's conscience and moral compass and when humanity loses its collective moral compass in the pursuit of raw intelligence - we become the cold and calculating husks deemed "the Observers."

In the series finale, December explains that all twelve members of the science team had begun to experience varying degrees of human emotion, and that they had all agreed to keep these emerging emotions to themselves, in order to remain undetected by the other Observers in the future. They were also unaware that their mission of observation was also a precursor to the invasion that would see the Observers take over in 2015.

== The Plan ==
Introduced in the first episode of the fifth season, it is revealed that Walter had worked with September on a plan that would defeat the Observers. The plan involved several elements, which Walter hid in various locations, and then created a series of video recordings on Betamax tapes that would instruct his future self or another viewer on where to find these elements. Shortly after the Observers' arrival, Walter scattered these tapes around his lab and then used amber to encase them, effectively hiding them from the Observers. He then had the memories of this plan scrambled in a way that could only be retrieved via the use of the "Transilience Thought Unifier Model-11". This was to prevent the hostile Observers from reading the plan from his mind.

When Walter is revived in 2036, he was found to have suffered mental damage and memory loss. Etta Bishop helps to regenerate Walter's brain with pieces that were previously removed by William Bell and stored at Massive Dynamic ("Letters of Transit", "Brave New World"). After recovering Peter, Olivia, and Astrid, Walter is captured, and though Windmark tries to probe Walter to extract the plan, the intense scan instead destroys that part of Walter's brain; though the Observers do not have the plan, neither does the Fringe team. However, considering Walter's habits of documentation, the Fringe team sneaks into Harvard, now converted to an Observer base, and discover that some of the tapes are embedded in the ambered part of the lab. They carefully and slowly extract each tape, and follow the directions to recover the items cited, during which they come to learn that Walter was aided by an unseen figured named "Donald".

One element of the plan leads them to the Observer child (previously seen in "Inner Child"), named Michael by his surrogate parents, who lacks the Observer implant. After some difficulty in trying to communicate with Michael, Michael provides Walter a vision, where it is revealed that "Donald" is really September. September is located - having his Observer implant stripped and undergone a "biological reversion" to become a normal human - and he explains that with the components they have collected, the plan would be to send Michael into the future of 2167, hoping that the researchers working on the gene program would see that it is possible to possess both emotion and intelligence, and put an end to the experiment. This in turn would erase the existence of Observers from time, and as postulated by September, reset time from the point when Observers invaded.
