= Subject 13 (Fringe) =

- Fringe episode
- Episode no.: Season 3 Episode 15
- Directed by: Frederick E. O. Toye
- Written by: Jeff Pinkner; J. H. Wyman; Akiva Goldsman
- Production code: 3X6115
- Original air date: February 25, 2011

Guest appearances
- Orla Brady as Elizabeth Bishop; Chandler Canterbury as Young Peter Bishop; Karley Scott Collins as Young Olivia Dunham; Sarah-Jane Redmond as Ashley; Chris Bradford as Olivia's step-father; Liam Mackie as Nick Lane

Episode chronology
← Previous "6B"	Next → "Os"
- Fringe season 3

"Subject 13" is the 15th episode of the third season of the American science fiction drama television series Fringe, and the 58th episode overall. Inspired by fan reaction to the show's previous flashback episode, "Peter", "Subject 13" occurs 25 years before the show's current timeline, in 1986 six months after "Peter". The episode, with scenes set in both the prime and the parallel universe, explores Walter and Elizabeth Bishop's attempts to return Peter to the parallel universe using the Cortexiphan-induced abilities of young Olivia Dunham, while Walternate in the parallel universe struggles to deal with the kidnapping of his son.

Showrunners Jeff Pinkner and J. H. Wyman, as well as consulting producer Akiva Goldsman wrote the episode, while producer Frederick E. O. Toye worked as the director. Guest actress Orla Brady returned to reprise the role of Elizabeth, while Chandler Canterbury, Karley Scott Collins, and Chris Bradford made their first guest appearances. On its initial broadcast in the United States on February 25, 2011, an estimated 4.0 million viewers tuned in. Critical reception to the episode was overwhelmingly positive. It was ranked the third best episode of the entire series by Entertainment Weekly.

== Plot ==
"Subject 13" is set in 1986, six months after the events of "Peter", during which Walter (John Noble) brought the parallel universe's version of his son Peter into the prime one to cure him of a genetic disease. In the following months, Peter (Chandler Canterbury) doubts he is from the prime universe, and attempts to drown himself in Reiden Lake, believing it the way to his universe. Elizabeth (Orla Brady), Walter's wife, worries for the boy, and takes him with her to Jacksonville, Florida, where Walter is studying the effects of the nootropic drug on several children. Walter and Elizabeth agree they need to return Peter to the parallel universe for both the child's sanity and to prevent that universe from discovering theirs.

In the parallel universe, Walternate's (Noble) position as national security czar makes Peter's disappearance a major news story. Walternate falls into a deep depression, unable to explain how his child has been kidnapped by someone that looked exactly like him. Elizabeth coaxes him out of his depression and he returns to Bishop Dynamic in Florida to continue his job.

One of Walter's subjects is young Olivia Dunham (Karley Scott Collins), aka "Subject 13". Walter suspects Olivia's stepfather (Chris Bradford) is abusing her based on bruises she carries and frightening drawings in her sketchbook, but Olivia refuses to talk about it. One night, as Olivia is about to be struck by her stepfather, she temporarily finds herself in a different place; the next day, she draws in her sketchbook a picture of what she saw in the other place: a zeppelin (which are a common mode of transportation in the alternate universe). Walter realizes that Olivia crossed over to the parallel universe, and can be the means for returning Peter. Walter puts Olivia under several tests to try to coax her to cross over, eventually eliminating all emotions but fear as the triggering mechanism. He arranges a traumatic test for Olivia, but instead of crossing over, she exhibits pyrokinesis and sets the room afire. In the confusion of extinguishing the blaze, she disappears.

Peter, discovering a picture of white tulips in Olivia's book, is able to find her nearby. After they introduce themselves, Olivia admits to being scared of going home to her stepfather. Peter tells her to trust Walter and to face her fear, and then returns her to the child care center, to everyone's relief. As Olivia waits for her stepfather, she sketches a picture of her and Peter in her book. As her stepfather is about to arrive, Olivia decides she must tell Walter about him, and rushes to his office. Olivia, in tears, hands Walter the sketchbook, explaining about her stepfather's abuse and that she knew she had crossed over to the parallel universe. She is interrupted by a sound from behind her: it is Walter. Olivia had temporarily entered the parallel universe and spoken to Walternate. Walter takes Olivia to her stepfather, but warns the man that he will be reported to social services if Olivia is harmed again.

Elizabeth and Peter return to Reiden Lake, and Peter eventually comes to call Elizabeth his mom, but Elizabeth becomes forlorn after she realizes the lie she has been maintaining for the last few months and drinks. The episode ends in the parallel universe, where Walternate has reviewed Olivia's sketchbook, including her latest picture of her and Peter; now aware of the prime universe, Walternate gains new resolve to get his Peter back.

== Production ==
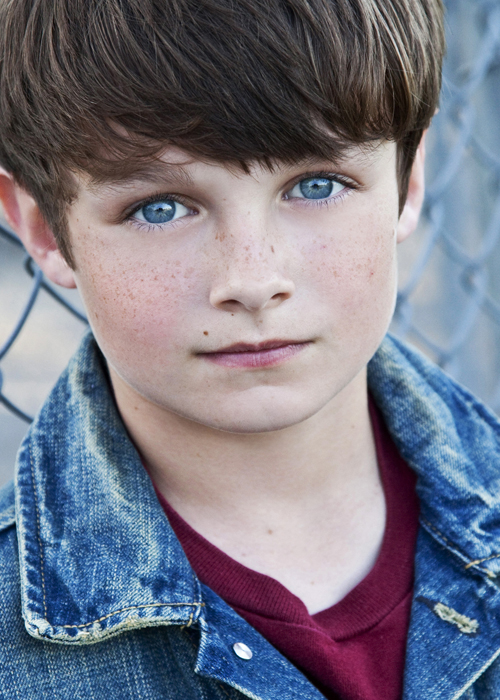
Chandler Canterbury (pictured) replaced Quinn Lord in portraying Young Peter Bishop.

"Subject 13" was co-written by co-showrunners Jeff Pinkner, J. H. Wyman and consulting producer Akiva Goldsman, while former Fringe producer Frederick E. O. Toye directed. It was the first episode Toye directed since the first season. In an interview with TV Guide, Pinkner and Wyman revealed they had known Olivia and Peter met as children for a long time, but did not decide to show this to the audience until they wrote the episode. Wyman described Elizabeth Bishop's successful lie at making Peter believe she is his real mother as "the beginning of the end for her," as her character will ultimately commit suicide.

Olivia's abusive stepfather, whom she non-fatally shot when nine years old, makes his first appearance in "Subject 13". In early January 2011, TVLine's Michael Ausiello exclusively reported that Fringe was casting for an actor to play the part. Several news sources later in early March noticed on the Internet Movie Database that actor Chris Bradford had been cast. The casting report later turned out to be true, as Bradford appeared in the episode. Chandler Canterbury appeared in the episode as a young Peter Bishop, a role previously played by Quinn Lord in the second-season episode "Peter". Karley Scott Collins also made a guest appearance as a younger version of Olivia Dunham.

Actor John Noble, who played two versions of a younger Walter in both "Peter" and "Subject 13", described the process it took to make him appear years younger in an interview with Digital Spy:

"Our makeup lady, particularly for the second flashback, worked out some terrific techniques to get the skin softer so it loses the wrinkles and so forth. This year we've come up with some terrific technology. And [I have] a beautiful handmade wig which at that stage was the right length - should we go on further we'd need to trim it back. We've looked at it really carefully. As we become more efficient it's generally about three or four hours in makeup".

As with other Fringe episodes, Fox released a science lesson plan in collaboration with Science Olympiad for grade school children, focusing on the science seen in "Subject 13", with the intention of having "students learn about adaptation and how the process helps organisms survive in their specific ecological environment."

== Cultural references ==
The show reuses the 1980s-styled introduction sequence from "Peter". One scene set in the prime universe is at a toy store and shows many vintage toys of that period, including toys from Ghostbusters, Battlestar Galactica, and G.I. Joe, as well as an Atari 2600 entertainment system. There, a boy can be seen playing the 1982 video game Joust. Before her stepfather strikes her, young Olivia is seen reading the book Winter's Tale by Mark Helprin. Among the tests Walter puts Olivia through is the Project Christmas block test ("The Indicator") from Alias, another television series created by Fringe executive producer J. J. Abrams. In the parallel universe, Walternate is credited with making the Star Wars program work, leading to his role as the national security czar. The episode also features a reference to the DC Comics character Green Lantern, dubbed Red Lantern in the parallel universe, as noted by Peter.

One of the other identified students at the daycare center is Nick Lane, whose adult character appears in the episodes "Bad Dreams" and "Over There". In parallel with William Bell's founding of the technology company Massive Dynamic in the prime universe, Walternate has founded Bishop Dynamic in the parallel universe, situated in Jacksonville. The field of white tulips revisits the theme of the episode "White Tulip" from Season 2, where Walter believes that seeing a white tulip is a sign of God's forgiveness of his actions. The video of Olivia setting fire to the lab, as well as the setting of the nursery school where the Cortexiphan experiments took place, are references to the second season episode "Jacksonville".

== Reception ==
=== Ratings ===
"Subject 13" first aired on the Fox network in the United States on February 25, 2011. It retained similar viewership from the previous week's episode, "6B", with an estimated 4.0 million viewers and a 1.5 ratings share among those aged between 18 and 49. In that demographic, "Subject 13" helped Fox tie with CBS for first place, though Fox placed in fourth among total viewers. Time shifted viewing increased the episode's ratings among adults by 53 percent to a 2.3 ratings share.

=== Reviews ===
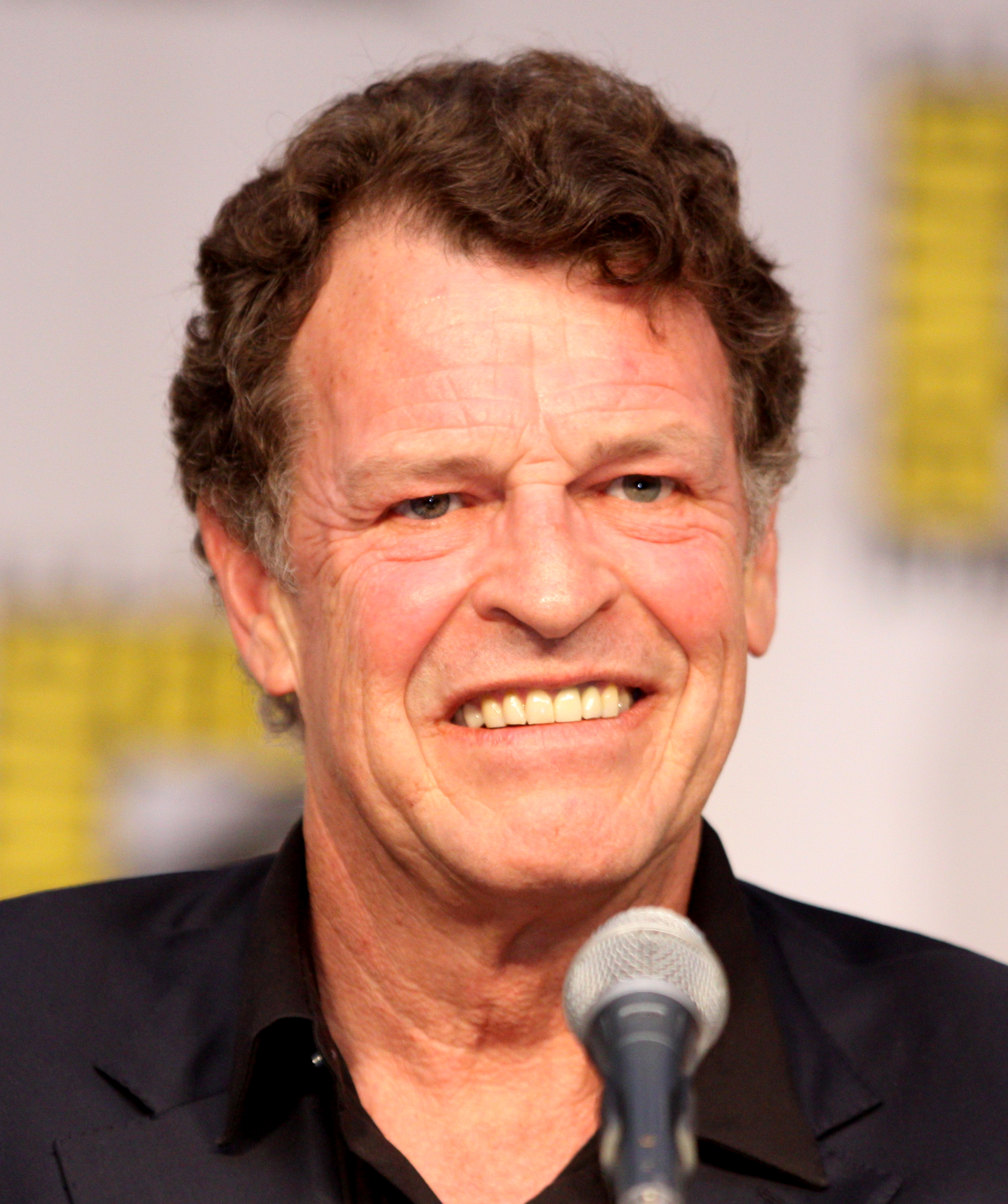
Critics praised the performances of John Noble (pictured) and Orla Brady.

The episode received almost universal critical praise. Andrew Hanson from the Los Angeles Times called it one of his favorite Fringe episodes due to the "incredible" opening, Brady and Noble's "outstanding" performances, and the scene with Olivia unknowingly talking to Walternate. Like Hanson, Ken Tucker from Entertainment Weekly also praised the actors' performances, and thought it was "one of the most moving and revelatory episodes in the series' short history". Though he felt the episode did not quite match up to "Peter", Ramsey Isler from IGN rated "Subject 13" an 8.5/10. He believed the opening to be "tense and surprising" and praised the child actors' performances. Finally, he thought the scene in which Olivia accidentally encounters Walternate was a "brilliant plot twist that ties a lot of things together".

CNN's Henry Hanks wrote the episode "is reason enough to bring this series back for another season," and praised Noble's performance as Emmy-worthy; Hanks also loved the "genius" musical score written by composers Michael Giacchino and Chris Tilton. Noel Murray from The A.V. Club graded the episode with an A−, explaining that, like the other reviewers, he loved the opening sequence with Peter on the lake, the newest mythology details, as well as how Walternate discovered the prime universe. Murray also loved the "mood" of the episode, but had minor problems with the plot, as he thought it was now harder to believe Olivia, Peter, and Walter were strangers to each other in the first season. James Poniewozik of Time magazine concluded that the episode "was not the revelation that 'Peter' was, though a phase-shifting Olivia’s mistaking of Walternate for Walter was one of the series’ most mindblowing moments (and, again, a Lostian bit of disorienting sleight of hand). But it was again an effective detour in which Fringe reminded us that time has parallels just as space does, and that the past is emotionally overlaid on the present just as its Over There is overlaid on our world."

TV.com staff highlighted "Subject 13" as one of the best television episodes of the 2010–11 United States network television schedule. Jeff Jensen of Entertainment Weekly named "Subject 13" the third best episode of the series, explaining "The nighttime scene between the two kids (well played by Chandler Canterbury and Karley Scott Collins) in the field of white tulips might be the most memorable scene in all of Fringe. 'Subject 13' is also one of the great parallel universe episodes, too, charting the shattering impact of Peter's abduction on both sets of Walter and Elizabeth (Orla Brady). 'Subject 13' was so essential, so emotionally wrenching." IGN found the episode to be the fifth best of the series.

=== Awards and nominations ===
At the 33rd Young Artist Awards, Chandler Canterbury received a nomination for Best Performance In a TV Series – Guest Starring Young Actor 11-13, but lost to Austin Michael Coleman of House M.D. and Baljodh Nagra of R.L. Stine's The Haunting Hour.
