= The Man from the Other Side =

- Fringe episode
- Episode no.: Season 2 Episode 19
- Directed by: Jeffrey Hunt
- Written by: Josh Singer; Ethan Gross
- Production code: 3X5118
- Original air date: April 22, 2010

Guest appearances
- Sebastian Roché as Thomas Jerome Newton; Ryan McDonald as Brandon; Peter Bryant as Ben McCalister; Katie Findlay as Jill Redmond; Fraser Aitcheson as Cop #1; Morris Chapdelaine as Delbrook / Shapeshifter Embryo; Viviana Dal Cengio as Bank Teller; Shawn Macdonald as Daniel Verona

Episode chronology
← Previous "White Tulip"	Next → "Brown Betty"
- Fringe season 2

"The Man from the Other Side" is the 19th episode of the second season of the American science fiction drama television series Fringe. The episode follows the attempts of Thomas Jerome Newton, with the help of shapeshifters, to create a pathway between the two parallel universes, while the Fringe team's Olivia Dunham, Peter Bishop, and Walter Bishop try to stop him.

The episode was written by co-executive producer Josh Singer and series story editor Ethan Gross, and directed by Jeffrey Hunt. It first aired on April 22, 2010 in the United States to an estimated 5.84 million viewers, helping Fox place second for the night. Television critics praised the episode for good pacing and a "heartbreaking" conclusion; one writer noted it was "full of just about everything I look for from the show".

== Plot ==
Walter (John Noble) has prepared himself to reveal to Peter (Joshua Jackson) the truth—that he is from the parallel universe—when they are called to a case. Two teenagers were found dead, evidently killed by shapeshifter agents from the parallel universe. Exploring the nearby area, they find a third unformed shapeshifter which Walter takes to the lab to study. At the same time of the teenagers' death, they find a carrier signal in the local television. With biotechnology corporation Massive Dynamic's help, they determine that the signal emanated from the parallel universe during a brief moment that the two universes were in sync, and that the next point of synchronization would occur the next afternoon. Recalling Thomas Jerome Newton's (Sebastian Roché) previous attempt to bring a building from the parallel universe into the prime, the Fringe team believes they must stop this next attempt.

From the unformed shapeshifter, they learn of a name of its potential target, a doctor at a local hospital. They take the man into custody but find that he has yet to be harmed. Based on the need for three shapeshifters, Walter surmises that Newton is trying to use the same technology that he and William Bell had pioneered for crossing the universes, by placing three vibrational sources triangulated around the target. Walter begins to collect equipment to create interference with the vibrations to prevent the crossing. Another corpse is found, that of a bank manager that appears to have been killed by a shapeshifter. Realizing both men would have access to secured areas in their workplaces, they use these locations as two points on Netwon's triangle. From this, they are able to identify two locations where the transfer will occur. Olivia (Anna Torv), using the information Walter has told her in private about his own crossing, identifies a collapsed derelict bridge over the Charles River, where the water would absorb the energy of crossing over.

The Fringe team converges on the bridge, where Newton has already started the process as the time of synchronization nears. As Olivia and the other FBI agent engage the two other shapeshifters in combat, Walter and Peter set up the interference device. Peter warns everyone, including Walter, back as he completes the interference device and the bridge, which still exists in the parallel universe, starts to appear with a man crossing it. The shockwave of its appearance disintegrates an FBI agent on the bridge with Peter but sends Peter flying back and knocks him out.

Peter wakes in the hospital, learning from Olivia that they saw a man safely cross the bridge and taken by Newton. When Walter arrives to see Peter, Peter tells him he has realized the truth: because he, like the man on the bridge, was not affected by the same shockwave that killed the FBI agent, he must be from the parallel universe. Walter is unable to deny Peter's accusations. The next day, Walter is devastated to learn that Peter has discharged himself and has disappeared.

== Production ==
The episode was written by story editor Ethan Gross and co-executive producer Josh Singer. It was Gross' first full episode writing credit for the series. Singer had last co-written the season's sixteenth episode, "Peter". Jeffrey Hunt served as the episode director, his first such credit for the series. Actors Ryan McDonald, Peter Bryant, Shawn MacDonald, and James Pizzinato guest starred in the episode.

The episode's opening scene featured the song "Tom Sawyer" by the Canadian rock band Rush. As with other Fringe episodes, Fox released a science lesson plan for grade school children focusing on the science seen in "The Man from the Other Side", with the intention of having "students learn about bioelectricity, the study of how electromagnetic fields interact with tissues, with a focus on how the muscular system requires the use of electric potentials."

== Reception ==
=== Ratings ===
On its initial American broadcast on April 22, 2010, the episode was watched by an estimated 5.84 million viewers. It earned a 3.6/6 ratings share among all households and a 2.1/6 ratings share among adults aged 18–49. While "The Man from the Other Side" had a 15 percent decrease from the previous week's episode, Fringe and its lead-in, Bones, helped Fox place second for the night despite competition from the other networks' original programming.

=== Reviews ===
MTV's Josh Wigler praised Jackson's and Noble's performances, and appreciated the show's ability to "gross you out in progressively unique ways". Noel Murray from The A.V. Club graded the episode with an A−, explaining it was "full of just about everything I look for from the show," as it had a sequence focused on weird science, a great performance by Noble, and a "heartbreaking" ending. Ramsey Isler from IGN rated the episode 8.6/10, as he thought it "delivered action, suspense, mystery, and the final climax" to Peter discovering his origins, and it was "a great achievement that marks a big turning point for the series". Like other critics, Isler also praised Jackson and Noble's acting. Ken Tucker from Entertainment Weekly lauded Noble and Jackson's performances, calling Peter's change back to "the secretive, bitter, scurrilous character he was before the series started" a "wrenching daring move on the part of the show". Tim Grierson of the magazine New York was worried that the hype surrounding Peter's secret would not pay off, but believed "Happily, last night's episode perfectly handled that anticipated plot point... [it] turned out to be much better than could have been hoped".

Hitfix's Ryan McGee found the possibility of Walternate being the aforementioned Secretary a "compelling idea," and loved the shapeshifting embryos. McGee concluded his review with a focus on the main cast's performances, "Joshua Jackson's understated nature during his final scene with John Noble really paid off. Had he blown into straight histrionics, the scene wouldn't have worked nearly as well. But playing it with controlled, eloquent, understated fury, he conveyed betrayal more than anger, which cut Walter even deeper than rage ever could." UGO Networks critic Alex Zalben was unhappy the promotions for the episode revealed Peter discovering his secret, "By showing Peter's revelation in the 'Next Week on Fringe' and subsequent commercials advertising this week's episode, [the network] totally, one hundred percent blew it." Otherwise, Zalben believed it to be an "awesome episode", and praised the shapeshifter visual effects. Jane Boursaw of AOL TV wrote, "This episode of Fringe had everything - a slimy embryo, a thrilling gunfight, nefarious shapeshifters, some alternate universe action, and yes, that heartbreaking drama we've been waiting for all season." Boursaw was slightly critical of Peter's discovery, explaining the relationship was built up so much that she wished Peter's subsequent estrangement had "turned[ed] out better" and had him stay with Walter.
