= Jacksonville (Fringe) =

- Fringe episode
- Olivia dreams of the experiments of her childhood while heavily sedated
- Episode no.: Season 2 Episode 15
- Directed by: Charles Beeson
- Written by: Ashley Edward Miller; Zack Stentz
- Production code: 3X5114
- Original air date: February 4, 2010

Guest appearances
- Jim True-Frost as Ted Prachett; Sarah Edmondson as Pauline Hess; Ada Breker as Young Olivia Dunham; Ryan McDonald as Brandon

Episode chronology
← Previous "The Bishop Revival"	Next → "Peter"
- Fringe season 2

"Jacksonville" is the 15th episode of the second season of the American science fiction drama television series Fringe, and the 35th episode overall. In the episode, Olivia is forced to recount her time spent as a child in tests conducted by Walter to regain the ability to see objects that have been influenced by the parallel universe and prevent the deaths of innocents. Though successful, Olivia comes to learn the truth about Peter, that he is from the parallel universe.

The episode was a mid-season finale. It was written by Ashley Edward Miller and Zack Stentz, and directed by filmmaker Charles Beeson. It premiered to mostly positive reviews on February 4, 2010 in the United States, earning an estimated 7.76 million viewers.

== Plot ==
A localized earthquake in New York City damages only one building, killing nearly all inside. The Fringe team discovers that a second building appeared at the same location as the first, fusing the structure and people inside together. Walter (John Noble) realizes that the second building has been pulled from the parallel universe by Thomas Jerome Newton, using the technology that Walter and William Bell had discovered years ago. Walter warns that because of conservation of mass, a building of similar mass will be taken from the prime universe to the parallel one sometime in the next few days.

While Massive Dynamic offers its computing resources to identify possible buildings of similar mass, Walter implores Olivia (Anna Torv) to recall her childhood Cortexiphan-induced ability to see objects from the alternate universe, believing she will be able to foresee which building will be affected and warn everyone in time. He takes her to the disused child-care facility in Jacksonville, Florida, where the Cortexiphan trials were performed. Walter first puts Olivia under heavy sedation, and she experiences meeting her younger, frightened self, but is still unable to trigger her ability. Olivia begins to remember the gruesome trials she experienced, including footage from one test where she exhibited pyrokinesis. As Walter's deadline nears, he realizes that Olivia is no longer frightened and thus she cannot engage her abilities, which were triggered by fear.

They return to New York City as small micro-quakes occur, indicating the onset of the event. Though a few buildings have been identified as possible targets, there are far too many to evacuate without starting a mass panic. Olivia, unable to help, goes off privately, but Peter (Joshua Jackson) follows and comforts her. Olivia soon recognizes she is frightened again, and races to a rooftop, seeing a building "shimmer" in the distance. The building, a hotel, is quickly identified from the list of candidates, and it is evacuated in time, moments before it is pulled into the parallel universe.

Agent Broyles (Lance Reddick) provides a cover story of an unexpected controlled demolition to explain the disappearance of the hotel. Olivia later meets Peter at his house prior to their going out on a date, but when she arrives, she sees the same shimmer on Peter. Walter quietly asks Olivia not to tell Peter that he is from the other universe.

== Production ==
"Finding strength in vulnerability is not something [Olivia] had been capable of. She's very good at putting things off and keeping things at a distance. Her wardrobe is all the same color, everything is muted in her life. She protects herself. The whole concept of her feeling something that she's never felt before, whether that was on an emotional, relationship level, or on a fear level, that was the key to that whole episode, her learning a little about herself."

— Showrunner J.H. Wyman describing the episode

Producers Ashley Edward Miller and Zack Stentz co-wrote "Jacksonville", one of their frequent collaborations. Filmmaker Charles Beeson served as the episode's director. Prior to the initial broadcast of "Jacksonville", co-creator J. J. Abrams and showrunners/executive producers Jeff Pinkner and J.H. Wyman released a joint statement about its plot, "Along with the usual mystery, suspense, science and general wackiness, the episode contains one big answer, the consequences of which will affect our team for the remainder of the season and beyond." Stentz later explained in the DVD audio commentary that in "Jacksonville by and large, the fringe event is Olivia. Olivia realizing that even in chasing all of these fringe events, she is the biggest fringe event of them all." Also in the commentary, Pinkner added that for the episode's final scene, "We knew it would be in the back third of the season that we would really acknowledge for Olivia that Peter came from the Other Side. The worst circumstance that could happen in is at a moment when they are getting as close together as possible".

Commenting on Peter's secret origins affecting their relationship, actress Anna Torv stated in an interview with Digital Spy that "Jacksonville" is "the episode that pushes us forward with a huge amount of momentum towards the end of the season. It all gets mixed up and then you find out what the drive is behind all of this. It's the big spanner in the works! The secret definitely has a huge impact on the lives of everyone involved."

"Jacksonville" was the first episode of Fox's initiative with Science Olympiad to release lesson plans for grade school students. Each lesson would relate to the week's particular science; in "Jacksonville"'s case, the intention was for "Students [to] learn about earthquakes of different magnitudes, as well as their impact on buildings and how it can be mitigated." Jeff Pinkner commented, "Everything we do is grounded in some version of authentic fringe science and what scientists believe is possible," and was pleased to be a part of "anything that can help invest kids in learning."

== Reception ==
=== Ratings ===
On its initial American broadcast on February 4, 2010, "Jacksonville" was watched by an estimated 7.76 million viewers, gaining a 2.8 ratings share for those aged 18–49. "Jacksonville" was the winter finale for the series, as the next episode did not air until April 1.

=== Reviews ===
"Jacksonville" premiered to generally positive reviews. James Poniewozik of Time Magazine called it "fine" and "well-acted", especially liking John Noble's performance. Noel Murray of The A.V. Club graded the episode an A−, explaining "I liked 'Jacksonville' for the way it plunged directly into the heart of the show's mythology for the first time in a while, and even if it didn't tell us much we didn't already know, having the story become more personal for our heroes served to create that unsettled feeling at which Fringe excels". Ken Tucker from Entertainment Weekly loved "Jacksonville", believing it to be a "tremendously moving, startling episode" and "one of [Fringe's] finest hours". AOL TV writer Jane Boursaw particularly praised the scene of Olivia trying to comfort her younger self, and then confronting Walter over it. She also felt Olivia's loss of memory to be "interesting," and became "practically gleeful" at her and Peter's near-kiss.

"This episode brought us more of the humor and warmth that elevate this series out of a mere horror show."

— SFScope columnist Sarah Stegall

Giving the episode an 8.0/10 rating, IGN's Ramsey Isler thought the episode wasn't "as hard-hitting as most of the previous 'mythology' episodes, but it still leaves a good impression". Isler enjoyed the "tense and intriguing" opening and ending of the episode, but kept waiting for more to happen in the middle. SFScope contributor Sarah Stegall called the opening "one of the best in the entire series" and "certainly the best television I've seen this year." In addition, Stegall praised Olivia's dream sequence and subsequent accusation of Walter, the inclusion of Massive Dynamic as allies, Broyles' role as "support" rather than "the usual role of Plot Obstacle," and the science behind the episode ("The very fact that we can have two different yet legitimate quantum physics explanations on a television drama is, in itself, cause for applause."). She concluded her review by noting Anna Torv has made "the most progress" in her performance, evolving from "downright wooden in the first year" to "carrying the role with grace and strength." Website blogger io9 listed "Jacksonville" as one of the "crucial" episodes new viewers must watch to get into the show.
