= Peter (Fringe) =

In the context of the television series Fringe, Peter may refer to:

- Peter Bishop, one of the protagonists
- "Peter" (Fringe episode), season 2 episode 15 (2010)
