= Walter Bishop (Fringe) =

- Fringe character
- First appearance: "Pilot"
- Last appearance: "An Enemy of Fate"
- Portrayed by: John Noble

In-universe information
- Occupation: Owner of Massive Dynamic; FBI/DHS consultant Scientist; Member of the Fringe Division Science Team
- Family: All Timelines: Robert Bishop (née Bischoff), deceased father Heinrich Bischoff, deceased uncle Olivia Dunham, daughter-in-law Ella Blake, great-niece Original Timeline: Henry Dunham, genetic grandson (erased); Alternate Timelines: Henrietta Bishop, genetic/adoptive granddaughter
- Spouses: Elizabeth Bishop, deceased wife
- Significant other: Reiko (both universes)
- Children: Peter Bishop, deceased birth son Alternate Peter Bishop, genetic/adoptive son

Walter Harold Bishop, Ph.D. is a fictional character on the Fox television series Fringe. He is portrayed by John Noble. Noble also plays Walter's counterpart in the show's parallel universe, who is referred to in the show as Walternate.

== Arc ==
Walter Bishop is the son of former allied spy, Doctor Robert Bischoff (Aug. 21, 1912 - Dec. 11, 1944) (Anglicized to Bishop following World War II). His father, a scientific pioneer at the University of Berlin, conducted espionage for the Allies within the Nazi government, sabotaged German research and smuggled scientific information to the Americans. Walter grew up with a love for science, and by the 1970s, became a head developer for a U.S. Government experimental research program called "Kelvin Genetics", alongside his long-time friend William Bell. He married Elizabeth Bishop in an undisclosed year, and their son, Peter Bishop was born in 1978.

Walter and his friend William Bell conducted numerous experiments in the area of fringe science, including developing highly advanced weapons for the Army. At some point during the 1970s, Walter and Bell discovered the existence of another universe, through the heightened use of LSD, among other drugs. They constructed a "trans-dimensional window", a portal through which could view the other universe, which was more technologically advanced than our own (in "Peter", the Other Side appears to have already created digital cell phones by the year 1985). They began copying the advanced technologies they saw over there, and sold them to the Army to benefit this world. They spent much time sending objects over to the Other Side, including Bell's car, and discovered that the "multiverse" requires balance. If a car goes over to the Other Side, then a car of the same mass must be sent into our universe.

In 1985, the now seven-year-old Peter contracted a rare and savage disease. Walter attempted numerous methods to cure him, ranging from trying to build a time machine to bring a researcher who specialized in these cases from the 1930s to the present, to watching his alternate self, dubbed "Walternate", work with advanced medicine to cure his own Peter in the alternate universe, who was also ill. But Walter could not save his son, and he died in his arms. Following the funeral, which Bell never attended, Walter became consumed with watching Walternate work to save the other Peter. Through the trans-dimensional window, Walter discovered that Walternate had formulated the correct cure for his son, but did not notice as he was distracted by The Observer known as September. Knowing that Walternate would not be able to cure the other Peter, Walter created the correct compound and built a doorway into the other universe, with the intentions of curing Peter there, and then returning home.

Nina Sharp, discovering Walter's intentions and their universally-destructive repercussions, went to stop Walter from opening the wormhole on Reiden Lake (the water from the lake would absorb any excess energy the doorway released). In the ensuing struggle, Walter managed to get through the wormhole, but Nina's arm was caught in-between both universes, and she needed to have a cybernetic arm put in its place. On the journey to the Other Side, the vial holding the cure was destroyed, forcing Walter to kidnap Peter, cure him back in our universe, and then return him. On the way back, they fell through an icy lake, but were rescued by September, who warned Walter that Peter could never return to the alternate universe. After he cured Peter, he and Elizabeth could not find themselves able to send Peter back, so they decided to raise him as their own.

Walter later explained that his kidnapping Peter stirred in him for the first time a belief in God and a sensation of endless guilt that he had violated God's domain and everything resulting from the pattern was God punishing Humanity for Walters hubris.

In 1991, Walter's lab assistant, Dr. Carla Warren, was killed in a fire, and Walter was charged with manslaughter, but was deemed mentally unfit to be tried, so he was locked away inside the St. Claire's Mental Institution. Walter would spend 17 years inside St. Claire's, and was never visited by Peter. Bell, under the alias of Dr. Simon Paris, performed several brain surgeries on Walter, extracting pieces of Walter's brain tissue, which contained the memories of how he crossed universes, per the request of Walter himself, who was frightened of what he was becoming. With the pieces of his brain gone, Walter's mental stability was compromised, and he was driven insane.

In the beginning of the first season, Olivia Dunham blackmailed the adult Peter Bishop to release his father from St. Claire's, in hopes of curing her lover, John Scott. Peter became Walter's legal guardian. After they saved John (who was thought to be a traitor, but later revealed to be an undercover NSA agent), Olivia requested that Walter and Peter remain in Boston, to which Peter reluctantly agreed.

In episode 1x04, "The Arrival", September returned and asked Walter to hide a mysterious cylinder for him. Peter became fed up with his father and decided to leave Boston, but was kidnapped by a man who wanted the cylinder for himself. September encountered Peter, and appeared to read his mind, making Peter realize "The Pattern" was far more than just plain coincidence. He also began to see that Walter was not as insane as he originally thought, and a father-son relationship started to blossom. And, Walter and Peter became civilian consultants to the U.S. Department of Homeland Security, under the supervision of Phillip Broyles.

During the episode, "Safe", Mitchell Loeb and a team of bank robbers used a vibrational dematerializing device to steal components from safety deposit boxes around the country. The science team realized the safe belonged to Walter, and the components were all pieces of the machine he constructed in 1985 as his original plan to save Peter, but was eventually scrapped, which could "bring anybody from any time or anywhere". Loeb used the device to rescue David Robert Jones from a German prison, and Jones became ill with radiation poisoning soon after.

The organization Jones worked for, called "Zerstörung durch Fortschritte der Technologie" (ZFT), or, in English, "Destruction through advances in technology", was based on a self-published, anonymous manifesto under the same title. Walter discovered that the ZFT manifesto was written in his very lab, by William Bell, years ago, after they discovered the alternate universe. In episode 1x20, "There's More Than One of Everything", Walter reveals the existence of the Other Side to Peter, without telling him he was in fact from there. Walter and Peter helped Olivia and Fringe Division stop Jones from crossing over to the Other Side to kill William Bell, and carried on with their lives, now happy as father-and-son.

A subplot in the first season was Walter and Bell's experiments with a nootropic drug called "Cortexiphan", which they used on children. Olivia was among the children who were treated with it, and was able to see into the Other Side because of it. But, this left her emotionally scarred, and she is always defensive when it is brought up.

In the season two premiere, "A New Day in the Old Town", Walter and Peter learned that Olivia had returned to our side after visiting William Bell in the other universe, but, her return voyage left her gravely wounded and comatose. Walter seemed to be greatly affected by this, as he had begun to look to Olivia like his own daughter. Thankfully, she regained consciousness, and Walter learned that the person who tried to kill her was a shape-shifting assassin from the Other Side.

By now, Fringe Division is aware of the alternate universe, and just as the ZFT manifesto predicted, they had intentions to destroy us. In the episode "August", an Observer called August contacted Walter to help correct a mistake, which Walter initially believed was to send Peter back to the alternate universe, but, it was in fact a method on how to "cheat death", which he had achieved before. In episode 2x10, "Grey Matters", Walter was kidnapped by Thomas Jerome Newton, the shape-shifters' leader, and had his missing brain tissue re-implanted for a short time. Walter, temporarily sane, was forced to reveal to Newton how he crossed over to the other universe, and nearly died because of it, driving Peter to great lengths to save him. In the episode "Jacksonville", Walter reactivated Olivia's Cortexiphan abilities, and she was able to identify objects from the other universe because of their distinctive "glimmer". When she looked at Peter, she saw that he projected the same glimmer, making her realize he is from the Other Side. But, she eventually promises Walter that she would not tell Peter the truth, though Walter decides he must do it himself.

In the episode "White Tulip" Walter is seen writing a letter to Peter revealing to him that he was from the alternate universe. He is unable to bring himself to give the letter to Peter for the fear of losing him again is too great. The team are chasing down a man trying to rewind time to save his fiancé from a fatal car crash. Each time the team comes close to catching him he "resets" time once again. Sent to negotiate with the time traveler, Walter tells him of his actions to save Peter and urges the man not to make the same mistake of changing the natural course of events, saying that he had "traveled through madness" to realize that some things must not be changed. Walter reveals that he has asked God to send him a sign of forgiveness in the form of a white tulip, a flower that did not bloom in that time of year. Heeding Walter's words, the man resets back to the day of his fiancé's death and holds her as a truck hits their car, killing them both. It is later revealed that during his last time 'reset', the time traveler leaves a letter for Walter with a colleague, to be delivered on the original day of the case. When Walter opens the delivered letter, he finds a tulip drawn on a white piece of paper: his so desperately sought after "White Tulip."

In the episode "The Man from the Other Side" Peter, when attempting to foil Newton's plan of bringing a bridge from the parallel universe, unexpectedly discovers that he is in fact, not from this universe. He is injured and while in the hospital, confronts Walter ("You said the effects of Newton's vibrations would be devastating. And they were, they... destroyed that FBI agent... they just... disintegrated him like he wasn't even there. But they didn't kill the man from the other side... and they didn't kill me. I'm not from here, am I?") and angrily blames Walter for his mother (of our universe) committing suicide ("That's why my mother committed suicide, isn't it? She knew. Didn't she? And when I left, the guilt was too much for her to live with... the lie."). At the end of the episode, Olivia notifies a crushed Walter that Peter has checked out of the hospital and is now on the run.

In "Northwest Passage", Peter is subdued by Newton and meets the man from the other side, who reveals himself to be Walter from the other universe (Walternate). Recognizing him as his biological father, Peter agrees to accompany him back to the alternate universe, where "Walternate"—who is in full command of his faculties, and holds the position of U.S. Secretary of Defense—tasks him with working on a mysterious machine which Peter eventually discovers ominously requires him to serve as a component. Informed by the Observers that Peter is in danger, Walter and Olivia cross to the alternate universe to recover him, with Walter sustaining a gunshot wound in the process. On their return to our universe, Peter tells Walter that he still hasn't forgiven Walter for taking him from his family as a child, saying, "I've been trying to see this your way Walter... and I can't. But you did cross universes twice to save my life. That's got to count for something." This gives Walter the promise of eventual reconciliation.

Following the events of the season two finale, "Over There", Walter begins to readjust to life with Peter, but his son still shows a hint of resentment towards his father. Unbeknownst to either of them, the Olivia Dunham they returned to our universe with was in fact her doppelganger, "Fauxlivia", while the prime-Olivia was held captive in the other universe. Fauxlivia was under orders from Walternate to locate the pieces of the doomsday machine constructed by "The First People". Massive Dynamic and Fringe Division begin collecting the pieces and rebuilding the machine in a secure bunker, and Olivia is able to cross over momentarily to alert Peter of Fauxlivia's deception, who he had been romantically involved with. In 3x02, "The Box", Walter discovers that William Bell (who sacrificed himself in the season two finale to allow the others to return to their universe) left him a controlling interest in Massive Dynamic, making him CEO of the company.

The science team captures Fauxlivia, but she is able to flee back to her own universe. Olivia manages to cross back onto our side, and reunites with the team. Following this, September reappears and orchestrates a series of events just to see if Walter is finally able to let Peter die, which he eventually realizes he can do. The science team visits the Massive Dynamic bunker where the doomsday machine is held, and it instantly activates because of the proximity to Peter, whose nose begins to bleed. The machine also does something to Peter—it "weaponizes" him. His behaviour slowly begins to change, and he even begins to hunt down and murder shape-shifters, making Walter realize the effect the machine has on him. After confronting him about it, it appears that Peter might be accepting what is happening to him, frightening Walter.

Later on, Walter begins to worry when the prime universe begins to break down which he believes will lead to what happened to the alternate universe. When Bell takes over the body of Olivia Dunham, he gets a chance to work with Walter again therefore giving him some closure. Walter and Peter go into Olivia's mind to rescue her and move Bell's soul into a computer, but the plan doesn't work.

After Walternate activates the machine on the other side, Peter has to get in it on this side, but Walter isn't willing to let him go. Eventually, he talks to Peter and lets him go in the machine, but Peter is thrown out and is badly injured. Walter goes to a church and talks to God, asking Him to save his universe even though he knows he has done bad things.

Once Peter gets back into the machine, his consciousness flashes forward to the year 2026. There Walter has been put in prison for destroying the other universe, but Peter is able to get him out to help him on a case. Walter realizes that the First People are indeed them and that they have to send the machine back in time through a wormhole that was created by the universes destruction. Back in present day, Peter uses the machine to create a bridge between the two universes, but then he is erased from the timeline and Walter is there to witness it.

In this readjusted timeline, Walter still took Peter from the other side, but once they crossed back over Peter drowned in Reiden Lake and died because the Observer didn't save him. Instead of Walter being checked out of St. Claire's by Peter, he was checked out by Olivia. He didn't live with Peter in a house, but instead lived in his lab and he hardly ever went outside of it due to tremendous fear. Without the constant of Peter being there, Walter was fragile and not whole.

Walter began to have visions of Peter and he believed himself to be going crazy until Olivia said that she was also seeing him in dreams. Eventually, Peter showed up in Reiden Lake after Olivia saw apparitions of him. Walter didn't trust Peter and especially didn't believe him to be his son. At first refusing to work with Peter at all, Walter slowly came to accept him and try to help him return home. As the two spent more time with each other, Walter began to regard Peter with a warm affection, treating him like the son he never had the opportunity to get to know.

In the season four finale, after Walter is warned by September of the upcoming invasion of the Observers they working together to create a plan to defeat them The plan was rearranged in Walter's brain to protect him from being read by Observers. Meanwhile, Walter created a series of videotapes leaving detailed directions to obtain all of the pieces of his plan should something happen to him. Before the invasion, William Bell and Walter reconnected. Bell claimed he wanted to help Walter defeat the Observers. However, William betrayed Fringe Division and led the Observers to them. Walter ambered his Harvard Lab and all of the videotapes. He also ambered Astrid, Peter, William, and himself, at an unknown location in New York City to prevent the Observers from reaching them.

In 2036, Walter was discovered in amber by an associate of Henrietta Bishop, his granddaughter. Etta and Simon Foster went to the former Massive Dynamic building to locate pieces of Walter's brain. Restoring Walter to a new form of sanity, the team was ready to begin constructing the plan Walter had designed decades prior to defeat the Observers. Walter also led him to the place where he had been ambered and removed Astrid and Peter. Walter, knowing he would need Bell's handprint to access the beacons located in Bell's storage facility, cut off his hand before heading off to find Olivia.

The reunited team began to seek out Olivia, who had been ambered while retrieving a vital component of Walter's plan, the Transilience Thought Unifier that could make sense of the pieces inside his brain. However, by the time Olivia was rescued, Walter had been kidnapped by the Observers. He was tortured by Windmark, who was trying to discover what Walter's plan was to bring down the Observers. The torture took such a toll on Walter that even after he was rescued, he could not get the device to unify his thoughts. Henrietta believed that his ability to recall the information was destroyed and irrecoverable. Walter discovered the videotapes once the team returned to Harvard and began the lengthy process of removing them from amber. Each tape led the team to a different piece of the puzzle.

The pieces of the brain that had been recently implanted back into Walter were the cause of his concern. He had the pieces removed because of the hubris man he was becoming decades before. He feared that he was slowly returning into that man once again. He requested that Nina help him remove the pieces from his brain once the plan was complete.

The team recovered Michael, a crucial part of the plan. He touched Walter's face in the lab as he tried to read his thoughts via machine to uncover his true significance to the plan. Instead, however, Michael showed Walter images from the Original Timeline. The memories came flooding back and Walter recovered all of his Original Timeline memories. He explained to Peter that he loved him even more now, although he had originally not thought this to be possible. After finding September (now calling himself Donald and turned into a regular human by the Observes as a punishment) they were able to gain a better understanding of the history of the plan: to travel in time to the year 2167 with Michael and prevented scientists from creating the emotionless Observers.

The final step of the plan, which would send Michael forward in time, required Walter. Michael would be incapable of communicating with the scientists, so he needed an escort who will be forced to live out their lives there as to ensure that a paradox is not created and that the Observers are wiped out. However, in order to safely travel through time, an inoculation was required. Walter was inoculated in 2015, believing it would redeem him for his hubris and breaking the universe many years before. He also left one inoculation in amber with the tapes in case something were to happen to him. September took the last inoculation in 2036 and explained to Walter that he wanted to take him himself, having come to have feelings for Michael.

However, moments after the portal was opened, September was gunned down by Loyalists. Walter realized that it had always been his destiny and that he must sacrifice in order to save the world decides to take Michael through the wormhole as Peter, Olivia, and Astrid look on. Before entering the wormhole, Walter looks back at Peter and Peter mouths "I love you, Dad" to Walter. Time flashes back to 2015, where Peter, Olivia, and their young daughter Etta are enjoying a day in the park. The Observer invasion does not occur, and the family returns home. When Peter checks the mail, he finds an envelope addressed to him from W. Bishop, containing only a piece of paper with a drawn white tulip on it.

=== Walternate ===
Walter also exists in the show's parallel universe, though to distinguish between the prime and parallel versions of Walter, the show's characters as well as its producers, journalists, and fans, identify the parallel character as "Walternate", a portmanteau of "Walter" and "alternate". However, they have several key differences in personality: Walternate never suffers from the brain damage his counterpart does, and is thus completely in control of his mental facilities. He is also more ruthless and cruel than his counterpart, with a firm belief that the ends justify the means.

Walternate in the parallel universe had a similar history to Walter through 1985, having married the same Elizabeth and having their own child Peter. There are variations in their history as well, in part due to the William Bell of the parallel universe dying in a car accident as a child and thus never befriending Walternate. Walternate was appointed as the United States "national security czar", and saw the Strategic Defense Initiative to its success. Walternate is also shown to have started a company called "Bishop Dynamic" (a parallel to Massive Dynamic, the company founded by William Bell in the prime universe).

In 1985, Walternate had worked on a cure for his Peter, but was distracted by September before seeing the successful result of the test. When Peter was kidnapped by Walter, Walternate slipped into depression and alcoholism, his job at risk, unable to explain how Peter was taken. After receiving moral support from Elizabeth, he returned to work, and later is surprised when young Olivia appears to him when she crosses over from the prime universe. Receiving her sketchbook, Walternate discovers that Peter is in the prime universe and resolves to get him back.

Leading into the show's present, Walternate has become the U.S. Secretary of Defense, overseeing a more militant Fringe division from his base on Liberty Island, though he has since separated from Elizabeth. He is also good friends with the second-in command of the Fringe Division, Colonel Phillip Broyles. He identified means of stopping the singularities caused by Walter's crossing in 1985 by using an amber-like substance to seal the area around these, regardless of the innocent lives trapped. He has also engineered the shapeshifters to cross to the prime universe and perform actions that ultimately allow him to cross over and convince Peter to return to the parallel universe. He shows Peter the doomsday device that they have found and reconstructed, and urges Peter to figure out how it works as the device only reacts to his biological signature. The purpose of the machine is later revealed during a scene at a pub; the observer strolls by, leaving behind a drawing depicting Peter being responsible for the apocalypse through the doomsday device.

When the prime universe Olivia and Walter arrive to rescue Peter, Walternate arranges for Olivia's doppelganger, Fauxlivia, to pretend she is Olivia and return with Walter and Peter. Having captured the original Olivia, Walternate subjects her to memory implantation to make her believe she is Fauxlivia while trying to recreate the Cortexiphan drug and understand its properties, intending to execute her once his goals are reached. Meanwhile, Walternate has engaged Fauxlivia to help the prime universe discover the same doomsday machine, eventually recovering one part that was missing in his construction. When it comes time for Fauxlivia to be extracted from the prime-universe, Walternate arranges for Olivia to be executed and her brain removed, with her body being used for the exchange of mass needed for Fauxlivia to return. However, a sympathetic Colonel Broyles helps Olivia escape, and is killed by Walternate's mercenaries in the effort, causing Walternate to use his friend's body for the mass-exchange, but has it mutilated first so that it would have the same mass as Fauxlivia.

When Fauxlivia returns and finds out she is pregnant with Peter's child and Walternate's grandchild, Walternate 'offers' to help in any way he can, believing the child will be an alternative way of activating the doomsday device through acquiring Peter's genes, going as far as to organize an anonymous kidnapping of Fauxlivia and accelerating her pregnancy to ensure the baby's survival. By now it is revealed that the vengeful, relentless Walternate's only previous interest in Peter was his unique biological blueprint needed to activate the machine. Believing that now that Peter has chosen his side, he doesn't hesitate to proceed to activate the machine with the intent of destroying the prime universe and his son along with it.

However, the machine does not work as expected: while it accelerates the deterioration of the prime-universe, it does not begin to heal the alternate one. After Peter activates the prime-universe version of the machine in an attempt to combat the decay, Walternate discovers he cannot shut down his version of it, and attempts to have Fauxlivia do it, believing that she might be able to access the same telekinetic powers as her counterpart. However, Peter uses the prime-universe machine to create a "bridge" between both worlds, so that both can work together to heal their prospective universes, an alliance which Walternate grudgingly agrees to.

Walternate's middle name is shown as Harold on a certificate in his office on Liberty Island.

== Development ==
Australian actor John Noble was cast in January 2008 as "an institutionalized scientist whose work might be at the center of the coming storm". At the time, he was a relatively unknown actor best known to audiences as Denethor in the 2003 film The Lord of the Rings: The Return of the King. Noble became aware of the Fringe casting call from his daughter, actress Samantha Noble. He explained, "She was in L.A. She said, 'Dad'—she rang me—'Dad, there's a role that's made for you. I've heard it, everyone's talking about it. J. J. Abrams.' So I rang my manager, and I said, 'Well, this role.' And they said, 'No, no, no, it's not for you, you're too young for it.' I said, 'Oh, okay, glad I asked.' So I went back to Australia and we were back there over the Christmas break, and she was there as well. I got a phone call", asking him to tape his audition. He taped it with his daughter and sent it; Noble commented "And that was it, off that tape. This is so unusual. Off that tape, I was cast as Walter Bishop. Just unheard of."

"I think at my better moments, there is a lot of me in Walter -- I hope not including his mental illness -- but in the strange sense of humor and the general interest in things."

— John Noble on his character

Noble has closely worked with the Fringe writers to develop his character's traits, in particular those that relate to Walter's madness. He explained, I did my own research into those rare breed, the geniuses, and it's not that they are anti-social — they simply have no social skills. It misses the point, in a way, to think any other way about it. I also studied the people who have been subjected to a lot of drug use — prescription and otherwise, the psychotropic drugs and so forth — and what happens in mental institutions. Walter would have been subjected to electroshock therapy, so that was something I looked into, what the short- and long-term effects might be. I made all of that part of Walter." For his character's accent, the Australian actor developed a unique transatlantic dialect, which Noble described as "sort of a Boston accent, but tempered with a bit of fake English, from years of flying around to conferences and talking to other academics from all over the world." In his research, Noble noticed many prominent scientists had "complicated and interesting relationships" with music, causing him to create a similar bond between it and his character.

In a November 2008 interview with the Los Angeles Times, Jeff Pinkner has called the character of Walter "incredibly fun to write for because he can say and do anything, which is a blast for a writer. He's incredibly brilliant and he's forgotten just how brilliant he is. He's scared of his own shadow, and he's scared of the things he's done in the past, and he's incredibly childlike." Pinkner continued that he, the other writers, and Noble himself have striven to focus on Walter's humanity, "[Noble] plays it from a believable place and doesn't play him from a goofball, cuddly cute place. That's our prime directive: Keep it real and honest."

== Personality ==
"Walter is like a King Lear for television. He's got all of those extremes. He goes from the raging fool into these incredibly tender moments. He had moments that, to most of us, are quite insane and then show this incredible lucidity. He can be laser-like at times. But do you know what? I don't know that those aspects of a person are far different from a lot of us, to be honest. It's just that Walter's barriers are so low that he actually does the things that most of us sit on. That's a great opportunity for me as a character actor, obviously."

— John Noble on his character

A mad scientist who has had parts of his brain removed by his partner, William Bell, and who spent more than 17 years in a psychiatric hospital for the criminally insane, Walter Bishop can best be described as an eccentric man. Once a brilliant scientist in the realm of fringe science, his trials in life have left him with gaps in his memory and with traits that can best be described as child like. While many parts of his intellect remain intact, he suffers from some degree of agoraphobia and has difficulty properly looking after himself, such that in both timelines he requires either Peter or Astrid to provide him with a basic level of care and supervision. He has a great penchant for culinary arts, and can be found cooking and eating at odd times, for example, both in his lab while performing autopsies, and while naked in Peter's kitchen. Red licorice seems to be among his most favorite of foods, though he also has a penchant for custard, root beer floats, and pastries. In line with his child like demeanor, Walter Bishop has a lovable innocence about him which is occasionally interrupted by tantrum like outbursts over largely trivial things. One such outburst occurred in the supermarket when he discovered the use of brominated food additives in pop tarts, when he was shopping for pudding, and another occurred in a hotel room, in which he found the thought of being surrounded by germs too great to handle. His personality contrasts sharply with that of his parallel universe counterpart, "Walternate"; the Secretary of Defense, who is cool, collected, serious, and has a clandestine way about him which gives others the impression that he is untrustworthy.

While some of these differences are likely attributed to the fact that Walternate was never institutionalized nor had parts of his brain removed, there is evidence to suggest that the personalities of the two Walters began to diverge long before the death of Peter Bishop the boy, from the primary universe. In the primary universe, Walter chose to come home the night his son would die, and it was Walter who showed his son how to do the coin trick. In the parallel universe, Walternate chose to remain at his lab, and it was his wife who showed their son the coin trick. Additionally, when Walter crossed over and kidnapped Walternate's Peter by impersonating him, the boy picked up on the subtle differences between the two and accused Walter of not being his real father. Apparently, Walternate does not wear brown jackets. The progenitor of this divergence might have inadvertently been William Bell. Walter and William Bell met as children and experimented liberally with drugs such as LSD in their youth, while Walternate never had the opportunity to meet the William Bell of his universe.

Nevertheless, we can occasionally see flickers of Walternate's cold demeanor in Walter, for example, when Walter sedated Astrid without her permission, by jamming a needle into the back of her neck, so that he could sneak away from the lab, and in the future when he coldly responds to a compliment with an insult. Though the latter situation occurred after cells from the removed portions of his brain were used to repair brain damage he had sustained.

Other similarities shared by the two Walters include a tendency to engage in what most would call scientifically unethical behavior, and a stubborn hatred of one another.

=== Relationships ===
"That's become the glue that sticks the show together, and I think J. J. Abrams always had that in mind. But Joshua Jackson and I just picked it up and ran with it. It seemed like a beautiful opportunity to create something special. It's resonated so much with our audience. People stop Joshua in the street and tell him to treat his father better. I had a driver the other day who told me that he totally relates to Walter as a father and going through difficult times with his son. This is beautiful stuff."

— John Noble on his relationship with Joshua Jackson

Prior to the pilot, Walter was estranged from his son, Peter, who was largely raised by his mother Elizabeth. Elizabeth committed suicide while Walter was in the mental institution. Walter and Peter have since gradually grown closer, though the relationship suffered upon Peter learning he was taken from the parallel universe as a boy.

Walter has remained fond of Olivia, and it was later revealed that she was one of his test subjects for his nootropic drug, Cortexiphan. Their relationship suffered when Olivia learned about this connection. Walter also is close with his lab assistant Astrid Farnsworth.

== Reception ==
=== Critical reception ===
Maureen Ryan of the Chicago Tribune called Noble the series' "secret weapon" for his ability to "move with lightning speed between surreal goofiness and touching insecurity, often within a single scene." Paste magazine named Noble as the 23rd best performance of 2010, calling him "excellent right out of the gate" and Walter as the "show's best character". TV Squad named Walter one of 2010's best television characters. The Los Angeles Times called Walter Bishop one of the best characters of 2008, noting, "the role of the modern-day mad scientist could so easily have been a disaster, but the 'Fringe' writers and the masterful John Noble have conspired to create a character that seems, as trite as it sounds, more Shakespearean than sci-fi."

=== Accolades ===
For the second season, Noble submitted his work for consideration in the Outstanding Supporting Actor in a Drama Series category at the 62nd Primetime Emmy Awards. Noble was nominated for the Satellite Award for Best Supporting Actor – Series, Miniseries or Television Film in 2008 and 2009. For the 2010, 2011, and 2012 Saturn Awards, Noble received nominations for Best Supporting Actor on Television, winning in 2011. Noble was nominated in 2009 and won in 2010 for Best Supporting Actor in a Drama Series at Entertainment Weekly's EWwy Awards. In 2011, for his work in the third season, Noble won the Critics' Choice Television Award for Best Supporting Actor in a Drama Series at the 1st Critics' Choice Television Awards and received a second nomination in 2012.
