= Peter (Fringe episode) =

- Fringe episode
- The retro title sequence used in the episode featured the Amelia font as well as an '80s rendition of the theme song
- Episode no.: Season 2 Episode 16
- Directed by: David Straiton
- Story by: J. H. Wyman; Jeff Pinkner; Akiva Goldsman; Josh Singer
- Teleplay by: Jeff Pinkner; J. H. Wyman; Josh Singer
- Production code: 3X5115
- Original air date: April 1, 2010

Guest appearances
- Jenni Blong as Dr. Carla Warren; Orla Brady as Elizabeth Bishop; Quinn Lord as Young Peter Bishop; Michael Cerveris as the Observer; Peter Woodward as August; Eugene Lipinski as December; Serge Houde as General Hames; Julian Christopher as General Tonks

Episode chronology
← Previous "Jacksonville"	Next → "Olivia. In the Lab. With the Revolver."
- Fringe season 2

"Peter" is the 16th episode of the second season of the American science fiction drama television series Fringe, and the 36th episode overall.

Considered a keystone installment of the series, "Peter" is a flashback episode, told as Walter Bishop (John Noble) reveals to Olivia Dunham (Anna Torv) that his son Peter (Joshua Jackson) is really the Peter of the parallel universe. Walter explains the events that occurred in 1985 that led to this, and the impact it had on the parallel universe to be at war with the prime one.

The episode's story was written by Akiva Goldsman, J. H. Wyman, Jeff Pinkner, and Josh Singer. Its teleplay was written by Pinkner, Wyman, and Singer. David Straiton directed the episode. It was guest star Orla Brady's first appearance as Walter's wife Elizabeth.

"Peter" first aired in the United States on April 1, 2010. An estimated 5.8 million viewers watched the episode, giving it a 2.2 rating share among those 18–49. The episode received almost overwhelmingly positive reviews, with numerous critics considering it to be the best Fringe episode to date. Actor John Noble was lauded for his performance, and "Peter" topped many "best of television" lists for the year. It was ranked the best episode of the entire series by IGN and Den of Geek and the second best by Entertainment Weekly.

== Plot ==
The introduction scene follows from "Jacksonville", where Olivia (Anna Torv) has discovered, through her Cortexiphan-induced abilities, that Peter (Joshua Jackson) is from the parallel universe, and Walter (John Noble) takes her aside to tell her how this came to pass, shown to the viewer in an extended flashback.

In 1985, Walter and William Bell had theorized the existence of a parallel universe, and created a window-like device to observe it. Though they use their observations for military benefits, Walter has a more personal interest in the parallel universe, to seek a cure for a genetic disease crippling his son Peter (Quinn Lord). "Walternate", Walter's doppelganger in the other universe, is also seeking a similar cure, his Peter suffering from the same disease.

The prime universe's Peter succumbs to his illness and dies, and Walter and his wife Elizabeth (Orla Brady) mourn their loss, supported by Walter and William's friend, Nina Sharp (Blair Brown) and Walter's lab assistant, Carla Warren (Jenni Blong). Walter, through his window, shows Elizabeth the other Peter, and asserts they should be happy knowing another Peter exists. Later, Walter watches Walternate explore other cures. Walternate is distracted by the arrival of an Observer, September (Michael Cerveris), and fails to see the telltale color change indicating a cure. Walter is able to recreate and stabilize Walternate's cure, and then decides to use untested equipment to cross over to give the cure to Peter. Carla tries to stop Walter, knowing the technology could damage the fabric of space-time, and contacts Nina for help. Separately, September informs his fellow Observers that he may have made a mistake and assures them he will correct it.

Walter sets up his equipment on the frozen ice of Reiden Lake, near a cabin where Elizabeth and Peter are staying; Walter theorizes the frozen waters will buffer the effects of the crossing. Carla arrives with Nina, and both try to talk him out of it. When Walter realizes William is not with them, he takes this as an implicit sign of William's consent to his plan, and activates the portal. Nina attempts to tackle Walter as he steps through, but instead part of her arm disappears in the portal as it closes; Carla rushes her to the hospital.

In the parallel universe, Walter finds the cure vial shattered when Nina tackled him and he devises a new plan: to bring Peter back, administer a new batch of the cure, and return him. Meeting the parallel universe's Elizabeth, he explains he is taking Peter back to the lab for some tests. As Walter walks Peter back across the lake to the portal, Peter realizes that Walter is not his real father. They cross through the portal safely, but the ice has weakened and both fall through, losing consciousness. Walter wakes to find September driving him and Peter back to Walter's lab. September warns that "the boy must live", and leaves Walter to drive the rest of the way. At the lab, as Peter receives the cure, Carla informs him that William will see to replacing Nina's arm. Elizabeth arrives unannounced, and is overjoyed to see Peter, even though it is not her child. At that point, Walter realizes he will never be able to make himself return Peter to his proper universe—the pain of losing their child for the second time would be too great.

In the show's conclusion in the present day, Walter tells Olivia that his crossing is what caused the crack between the two universes, including the Pattern on their side, and leading to the oncoming "storm" that William warned Olivia about.

== Production ==
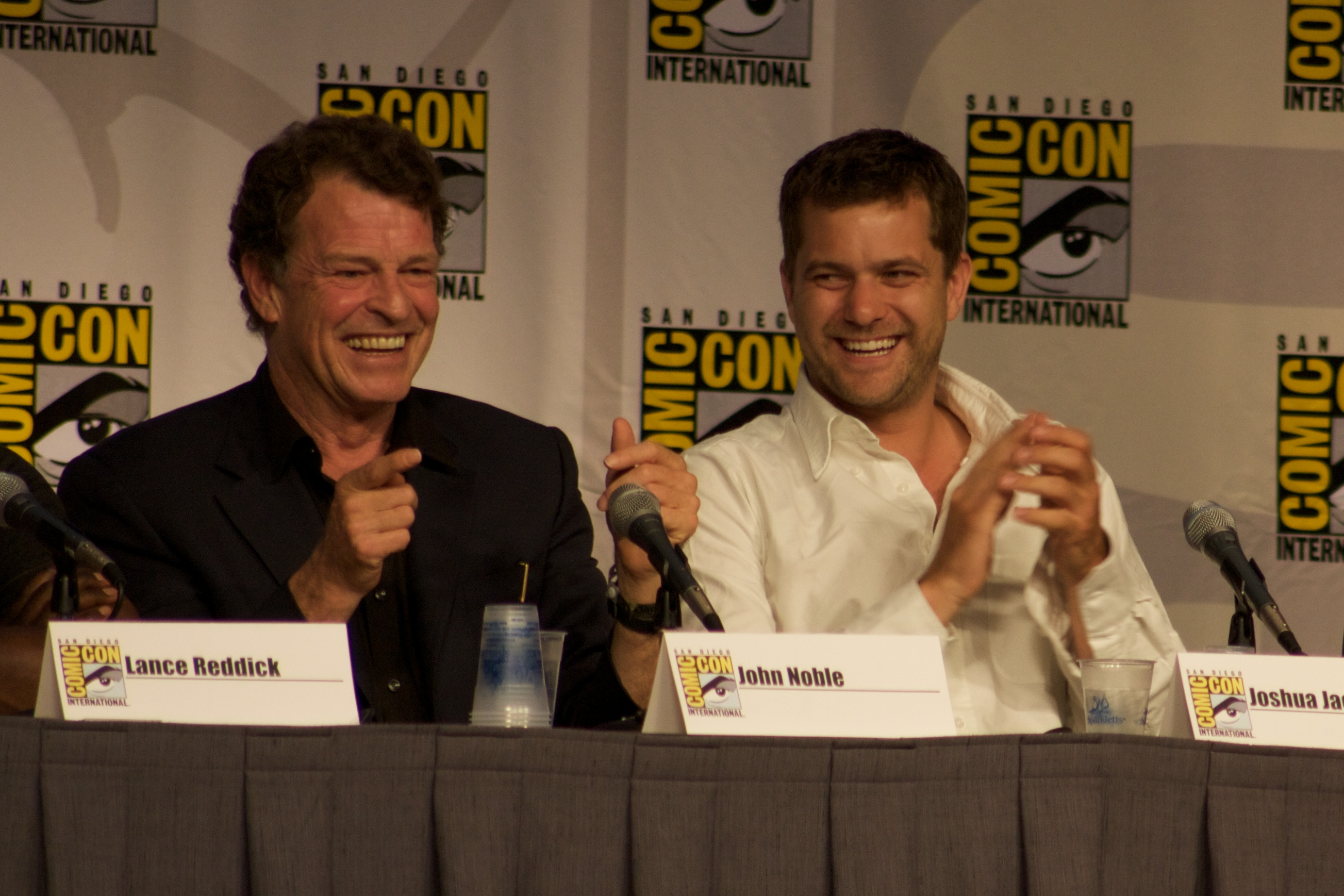
In an interview, John Noble (pictured left) explained the episode "lets us know what has happened, why Peter [(played by Joshua Jackson, right)] is where he is and it also tells us specifically how Walter went to get him. So we see how he crossed over into the other universe".

The episode's teleplay was co-written by supervising producer Josh Singer and co-showrunners Jeff Pinkner and J. H. Wyman, based on a story by Singer, Wyman, Pinkner, and consulting producer Akiva Goldsman. House M.D. veteran David Straiton served as episode director.

Fringe began casting for an actress to play Walter's wife Elizabeth in November 2009. In their report, they were looking for a woman roughly forty years old who was described as being "strong (yet broken), intelligent, attractive, likable, lovely and extremely versatile". In December 2009, Entertainment Weekly announced Irish actress Orla Brady had been cast as Elizabeth Bishop, a possible recurring character. Some critics questioned the casting, as they considered Brady to be too young and were unsure if she would appear in the present or a flashback sequence.

"Peter" was set in 1985, with a much younger Walter and Peter Bishop, and also features an appearance by Walter's wife Elizabeth. Actor John Noble used material he had created since the airing of the pilot, which he explained was his sense of "what was this man like before he deteriorated." The production crew tried different methods with the actor to create a younger Walter, such as changes to his hair, make-up, and wardrobe; they ultimately decided on using "tabs" to keep the wrinkles in his face back. He did not wear a wig, but the crew did add parts to the front and back. When asked what preparation went into playing a younger Walter, Noble explained:

"Quite a lot, but in the sense in my preparation to find the Walter that we all know now, I had to go back to him right at the beginning to see where he came from. So that process was started before the pilot really, what was this man like before he deteriorated, so I was able to revisit that. Physically, of course, what I had to do was capture the energy, to capture the physicality of the man, the vocal physicality of the man, this was my task. I was aided enormously by my hair and makeup and special effects people here in terms of getting the overall, and indeed wardrobe helped a lot as well. And then we, the shot up through these beautiful lenses that we got a different feel to the episode than we would now. All of those elements work together... to create this version that you see in the episode."

The episode was shot through special lenses to make it more reminiscent of the decade. At Peter's funeral, actress Blair Brown wanted her character Nina Sharp to wear sunglasses, because she thought Nina would not share her emotions at the funeral. Unlike Noble, Brown wore a wig. The scenes at Reiden Lake were actually shot on a parking lot, and the crew placed a covering over it to simulate the cracks normally on a lake.

To reflect the episode's setting in 1985, the typical title credit sequence was redone using different music, the Amelia font for early computer type for the show's logo, and terms that were novel science at the time, such as "virtual reality", "genetic engineering", and "personal computing". Pinkner later recalled, "One of our writers said off-handedly that if we’re doing a show from 1985, shouldn’t we do a credit sequence from 1985, and literally, we pounced on it". He and Wyman asked J. J. Abrams, who wrote the original credit sequence melody, to write a 1980s version; Abrams was "very, very happy to do that," according to Wyman.

As with other Fringe episodes, Fox and Science Olympiad released a lesson plan for grade school children based upon the science depicted in "Peter"; the lesson's intention was for "students [to] learn about the challenges of effectively communicating scientific principles and concepts, especially via non-verbal methods."

== Cultural references ==
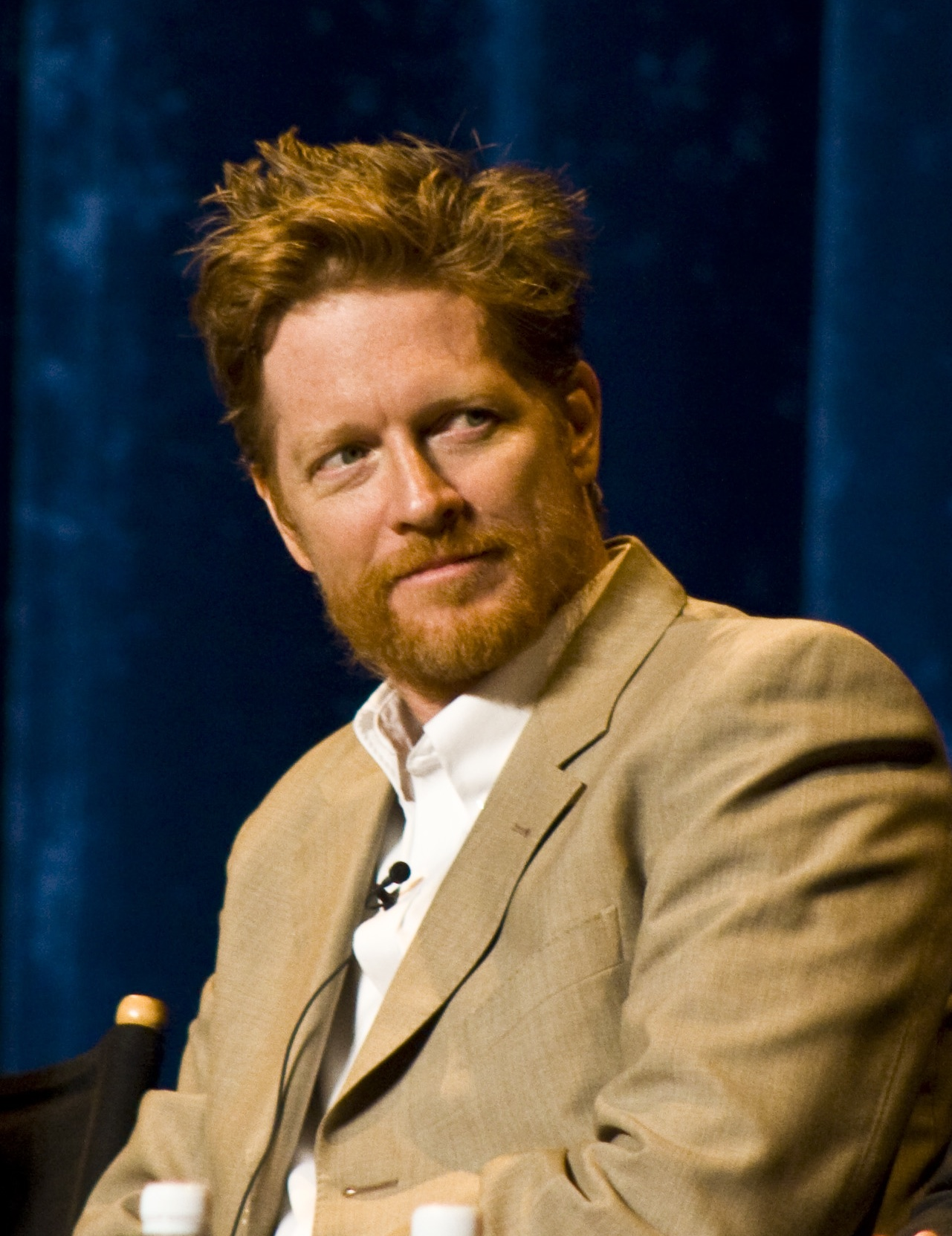
In the parallel universe, actor Eric Stoltz was the star of Back to the Future.

In viewing the parallel universe through the window, Walter and others witness a zeppelin docking at the Empire State Building, which was originally part of the building's purpose until it was shown to be impractical. In a scene that takes place in the parallel universe, the Observers are seen leaving a theater having watched Back to the Future starring Eric Stoltz; in reality, Eric Stoltz was originally cast in the role of Marty after Michael J. Fox was unavailable, but after filming for several weeks, Stoltz was replaced by Fox.

== Reception ==
=== Ratings ===
On its first broadcast, "Peter" was watched an estimated 5.8 million viewers, achieving a 3.6 share in all households and 2.2 share of viewers between 18 and 49. In a Thursday night that had rating slumps from all the network shows, "Peter" was down 15 percent from the previous episode "Jacksonville".

=== Reviews ===
"Peter" received widespread critical acclaim. As described by Andrew Hanson of the Los Angeles Times, "'Peter' is exactly what Fringe needs to be" for the show to distinguish itself from others like The X-Files, in that it teased hints of the episode's reveal in earlier shows, and followed through by revealing the truth, leaving the viewer wanting to know even more. Ramsey Isler of IGN considered "Peter" "the most masterfully crafted episode Fringe has ever had", praising the performance of Noble and Brady in delivering the emotion needed for the episode. Tim Grierson of New York Magazine also praised the emotional performance of John Noble, calling it his "showcase" and one where "he didn’t disappoint". The A.V. Club's Noel Murray considered the episode one of the best of 2010 up to that point, and that "the show came back with a sense of purpose and surety it’s rarely had, even at its best".

Since its airing and continuation into Season 3, "Peter" has been considered a keystone episode for the series. Jeff Jensen of Entertainment Weekly called "Peter" the episode "when Fringe crossed over from fitfully great to just plain great", and continues to maintain that quality throughout 2010. Time's James Poniewozik ranked "Peter" as the 5th best television episode of 2010, stating that it both "fleshed out its mythology" and "deepened the emotional backstory", and further praised Noble's acting in the episode. The A.V. Club ranked Fringe the 15th best show of 2010, highlighting "Peter" as an episode that "finally dramatized the moment that changed [Peter's] life, giving the series’ overarching storyline a devastating emotional core, based in a father’s love instead of in theoretical concept". The Futon Critic ranked "Peter" as the 9th best episode of 2010, calling it a "series defining episode that not only rationalized what appeared to be the unforgivable but also raised the stakes on everything we had come to expect from the show thus far".

Similarly, BuddyTV rated it the seventh best episode of 2010, praising it for "open[ing] the door to the show’s brilliant use of the alternate universe," and calling Noble's acting "one of the best performances on TV". SFX ranked "Peter" among the twenty things they love about the series, calling it "the lynchpin episode on which all of Fringe rests." Executive producers Jeff Pinkner and J.H. Wyman, and co-creator J. J. Abrams later said that "Peter" was one of their favorite episodes. In a 2013 list, Den of Geek ranked the episode as the best of the entire series.

As one result of the high praise and fan appreciation for "Peter", a future episode, "Subject 13" (originally named "6 Months Later") in Fringe's third season aired on February 25, 2011. It returned to the events within "Peter" but told from the perspective of the parallel universe, including the impact of Peter's abduction on both Walter and Elizabeth. Jeff Jensen of Entertainment Weekly named "Peter" the second best episode of the series, explaining that it "stands as a model for mythological storytelling that any sci-fi/fantasy series would be wise to emulate." In January 2013, IGN ranked the episode as the best of the series:

The quintessential episode of Fringe lore, 'Peter' gave us a flawless peek at the past, and the events that caused all this universe-clashing mess in the first place. The episode was marked by a pitch-perfect pace, excellent "youthenizing" special effects, and a story that plays your heartstrings like an expert bard plucking out a tearful tune on a lyre. This episode brought us so many answers to the major questions of the series... This was Fringe at its best.

— IGN

=== Awards and nominations ===
Writers J.H. Wyman, Jeff Pinkner, Josh Singer, and Akiva Goldsman submitted "Peter" for consideration in the Outstanding Writing for a Drama Series category at the 62nd Primetime Emmy Awards. At the 2011 Young Artist Awards, Quinn Lord received a nomination for Best Performance in a TV Series under the category "Guest Starring Young Actor Ten and Under".
