= Olivia Dunham =

Fictional character

- Fringe character
- First appearance: "Pilot" (episode 1.01)
- Last appearance: "An Enemy of Fate" (episode 5.13)
- Portrayed by: Anna Torv

In-universe information
- Nicknames: Liv, Olive (as a child)
- Occupation: FBI agent FBI interagency liaison Marine Corps special investigator
- Family: All Timelines: Marilyn, deceased mother (née unknown); Unnamed father Unnamed uncle (unseen); Unnamed stepfather Rachel Blake, sister Eddie, deceased grandfather (unseen); Greg Blake, brother-in-law (unseen); Missy, aunt (unseen); Walter Bishop (father-in-law); Alternate Timelines: Nina Sharp, guardian Eddie Blake, nephew (unseen)
- Spouse: Peter Bishop
- Significant others: John Scott; Lucas Vogel
- Children: Original Timeline: Ella Dunham (née Blake), biological niece (adoptive daughter in 2026 possible future); Alternate Timelines: Henrietta "Etta" Bishop, daughter (alternate and final timelines)

Olivia Dunham is a fictional character and the main protagonist from the science fiction television series Fringe, created by series' co-creator J. J. Abrams, and is portrayed by actress Anna Torv. Olivia is the series' protagonist, and was introduced as an FBI Special Agent, working for a multi-agency task force of the U.S. Department of Homeland Security called the Fringe Division, dealing with supernatural events that are linked to experimental occurrences. Having grown up with an abusive stepfather, Olivia struggles with the unexpected changes in her life, following her encounter with mentally unstable scientist Walter Bishop, and his son and an eventual love interest for her, Peter Bishop.

Olivia's perspectives and inner feelings seemed to make her life harder for her but very often serve as the focal points for episodes of the series that directly focus on her development as a human being and a member of the law enforcement community. Critically acclaimed for an evolving storyline, Olivia has highlighted determination and focus as her main traits, according to Abrams. Following a plot line in the second season, viewers are introduced to Olivia's doppelgänger from the parallel universe, which develops an alternate reality for each character. Torv has received several awards for her portrayal of Olivia.

== Arc ==
Olivia is a 29-year-old Northwestern University-educated FBI Special Agent assigned to a multi-agency task force of the U.S. Department of Homeland Security called the Fringe Division, after her partner and lover, John Scott, is exposed to a flesh-dissolving agent. Both Agent Broyles and Nina Sharp consider her to have much potential and talent, the latter even hoping to bring her on as an employee of Massive Dynamic. An experiment by Dr. Bishop to link her to the dying John Scott's mind to learn what he knew about his condition results in Olivia gaining part of his consciousness, causing her mind to begin integrating and purging the foreign consciousness. This results in Olivia mistaking John Scott's memories for her own. With help from Walter, Olivia finds a way to communicate with John within her mind, eventually allowing the memories to fade completely.

Olivia is revealed to be linked to the drug Cortexiphan, a chemical developed by William Bell, which supposedly allows children injected with it to retain higher brain functions which would normally deteriorate with age. Olivia was one of a group of preschool-age children who served as subjects of the experiment in her childhood home of Jacksonville, Florida. As a result, Olivia is capable of unspecified psychic abilities, as demonstrated when she shuts off a series of lights wired into a bomb as a kill switch simply by thinking of it. Walter has a video of Olivia as a child, ostensibly recorded during the drug trials, which shows her curled up in the corner of the room next to a badly charred bed with Walter saying: "It's all right, you didn't mean it." We later learn that Olivia started the fire with her mind. Olivia also could discern if an object originated in the alternate dimension due to a "glimmer" that only she could see. When trying to reawaken this ability in her as an adult, Dr. Bishop hypothesized that this ability was partially derived from Olivia's fear of seeing into the alternate dimension. When Olivia regains part of her memories of her meeting with Bell, she is told that she is the only successful subject suitable to pass through dimensions without many known negative side-effects. She has been called the guardian of the gateway by Bell, who will prevent the invasion by the alternate dimension.

Olivia is given permission by Nina Sharp to meet William Bell, who currently resides in another dimension, with his office in the World Trade Center's South Tower. Having left her universe moving at a high speed, she returns at the same speed, crashing through the windshield of her now stationary car, leaving her in an almost fatal condition. She ends up in a short coma and wakes up in an incoherent state and in shock. Olivia apparently loses her memories of her meeting with Bell and whatever information he may have told her. She regains part of those memories and learns more about the invasion between dimensions. Following the transition to an alternate reality, Olivia meets her doppelganger "Fauxlivia", and ultimately shares a kiss with Peter Bishop. She is trapped in the alternate universe by Walternate, Walter's alternative self, while Fauxlivia replaces her in the prime universe. She is captured and drugged, brainwashed into believing that she is the alternate Olivia, complete with traits such as superb marksmanship skills which prime-universe Olivia did not possess. Olivia tries to escape her imprisonment and travel back to her own universe, but in doing so, she inadvertently goes to Fauxlivia's mother's house where she finally accepts the new memories as her own. It is revealed that the alternate Walter plans to use Olivia's Cortexiphan-derived abilities to find a way to safely cross universes, for which he needs her willing assistance. However, Olivia begins to regain her past memories after she has hallucinations of Peter Bishop, who comes to her in a vision and tells her that she doesn't belong there before kissing her. With the help of the alternate universe's Agent Broyles, she is able to escape from custody and make it to alternate Walter's Harvard lab, where she uses the tank to return to her own universe. Meanwhile, Peter realizes that he is with alternate Olivia, causing her to flee and return to her own universe as well. After returning to work, Olivia is dismayed to discover that Peter had become intimate with her doppelganger.

After Olivia tells Peter she no longer wants to be with him, even though that's not what her heart wants, she tries to remain distant and impassive. However, they continue to work together and her time with Peter reminds her why she fell in love with him, and she tells him she wants to see him happy with her. They begin dating and their relationship is progressing when Walter realizes he has brought back William Bell, who died in the alternate universe, by using soul magnets and he now resides in Olivia's mind. Initially, Bell and Walter think Olivia will just be a host for Bell while they find a way to move his consciousness to another entity, but they find that Olivia is losing herself and her personality will soon be gone. Peter, Walter and Bell use LSD to go into Olivia's mind to locate and save her, but Bell is lost forever when he helps Olivia come to grips with her hidden fears and she regains consciousness. Olivia and Peter are soon caught up in Walternate's scheme to destroy their world using the doomsday machine and Olivia tells Peter she loves him before he steps into the machine to stop it.

By the 4th season of the show Peter is erased from both universes. Olivia in the Peter-less universe was adopted as a child along with her sister by Nina Sharp whom she considers a surrogate mother. Though she has a working relationship with Walter and Astrid she retains no memories of Peter though she begins to develop visions of him. When Peter resurfaces Olivia is surprised to see him but believes he comes from a parallel universe. As they spend more time together Olivia begins to remember her time with Peter and gradually comes to realize that she is "his" Olivia while her memories from the readjusted timeline begin to slip. Olivia later learns that she is pregnant with a daughter, Henrietta "Etta" Bishop (Georgina Haig).

In 2015 when Olivia is at a park with Etta and Peter they are caught up in a global attack by observers and she and Peter are separated from their daughter. As part of a plan to defeat the now hostile observers, Olivia and the rest of the Fringe team purposefully trap themselves in amber. They are rescued by Etta in 2036. Olivia learns that while Etta poses as an enforcer for the observers she is actually resistant to their telepathy and is a key figure in the human resistance movement against them. She works with Etta until Etta is murdered. After Etta's death Olivia is mournful and grows apart from Peter, however after he tries to harness observer technology to avenge Etta's death Olivia talks him into abandoning his plan and the two becomes close again.

Once Walter is able to accompany the child observer, Michael, to the future, he erases the time in which the observers are able to travel back and take over in 2015, and Olivia and Peter are once again in the park with Etta as a child. They look around at the same time in which the observers initially appeared and seeing nothing, go back to playing with Etta.

== Development ==
=== Casting ===
After looking at many auditions "well past the 12th hour" for the role of Olivia Dunham, Australian actress Anna Torv was selected for the part. Casting director April Webster commented, "What we were looking for in Olivia was a woman who was believable as an FBI agent but yet had some vulnerability. And definitely had depth and a history behind her eyes." Not having seen Torv before, they came across an audition tape of hers for another movie, and were "immediately intrigued". Executive producer Bryan Burk later said "there was just something really special about her and really smart". Webster called a friend in Australia, and were able to arrange an audition with Torv, who was camping in the Outback at the time she received the call from her agent. Torv read for a few scenes over the Internet, and was told the following day that she had won the role, embarking for Toronto soon after to begin shooting. One later called her casting "the miracle of the whole thing". Production team member Alex Graves commented on Torv's casting:

What Anna brings to the project is that she comes into the world of Fringe with all of its edge and mystery, and she brings this sort of elegance and poise to it that makes you just love her and want to make sure she's OK and gets through it.

— Alex Graves

=== Characterization ===
What's interesting about this show is that in many ways, Olivia has the masculine role, and the two guys are the women. She carries the gun, they sit around and talk. I think that's pretty cool.

— Anna Torv

Olivia Dunham (Fauxlivia)
- Fringe character
- Fauxlivia, first introduced in "Over There".
Character data
First appearance	"Over There Part 1" (episode 2.22)
Last appearance	"Liberty" (episode 5.12)
Portrayed by	Anna Torv
In-universe information
Aliases	Fauxlivia; Olivia Lee
Nickname	Fauxlivia
Occupation	FBI agent Marine Corps special investigator
Family	Marilyn Dunham (mother); Rachel Dunham (sister; deceased)
Spouse	Prime universe Lincoln Lee
Significant other	Frank Stanton (separated)
Children	Henry Bishop (son; erased in alternate timeline); Trevor Lee (son; alternate timeline)

The character of Olivia has been described as "an incredibly driven, incredibly brilliant agent with her own complicated past that will be peel[ed] back over time." She is a loner and dedicates almost all of her time to her work. She has a strong sense of justice, which drives her to solve a case by any means necessary. It is this quality which both impresses and irritates Broyles, as it makes her a good agent but also makes her prone to biting off more than she can chew when it comes to pursuing suspects. Olivia had an abusive stepfather, and shot him several times in defense of her mother and herself. She was unable to finish him off, and so he recovered and disappeared, leaving her to blame herself for not exacting retribution against him, contributing to her determination to bring criminals to justice. She was nine years old when she shot her stepfather, and she states in an earlier episode that she knew what she wanted to do for a career "pretty much since [she] was nine", indicating a direct link between the childhood abuse and her job.

In the reset timeline for the series' fourth season, Torv explained that "The Olivia we meet and know has known about Fringe Division and had all this time to get used to it and work out that this is her life," rather than becoming familiar with it after the attack on John Scott. Consequently, "when Lincoln comes in, she's a little more open to him [than she was with Peter] and working with someone again."

Olivia has few close relationships. She has little family, as her mother died when she was in her early teenage years. Olivia's is close to her sister Rachel, and Rachel's daughter Ella. Olivia was involved in a serious relationship with fellow FBI agent John Scott, and his supposed betrayal and death was something she dealt with for much of the first season. In the second season finale, Olivia and Peter Bishop finally admit their feelings for each other and kiss. Fauxlivia was involved in a serious relationship with Frank Stanton and eventually became engaged, but the two broke up when he discovered she was pregnant by Peter. Olivia was in a relationship with Peter after they mended things in episode 6B, but shortly after that Peter built a bridge wiping himself from existence, causing Olivia to forget who he was. But through the cortexiphan and the power of their love, she soon remembered her life with him. They were married and have a daughter. In episodes 4.19 Letters of Transit and 5.1 Transilience Thought Unifier Model-11, their daughter finds them and reunites them.

=== Fauxlivia ===
Comparing Olivia to Fauxlivia, Torv felt that the two had many different characteristics. Anna Torv described them as "remarkably alike. They have subtle differences, but they're both fighting for their causes. I think each of them sees things in the other they'd like to have. I think Olivia would like to not feel everything is her responsibility. She'd like to go home and let someone else shoulder that burden of saving the world for a few minutes."

Torv and Akiva Goldsman discussed various ways to differentiate the two depictions of Olivia; ultimately two different physical demeanors were created. Torv wanted to make the new character "completely different", but she and Goldsman recognized that the two share some major similarities, as they both are in the same profession and are "fundamentally, genetically really the same person." According to Torv, Fauxlivia holds herself differently and has "a different silhouette. She's got a little firefighter, a little military in her." Torv further explained, "Olivia wants to be the best, but [Fauxlivia] just wants to win;" "There's just a front-footedness I think to [her], simply because she just doesn't carry the weight of the world on her shoulders like Olivia does. Olivia's mum died when she was really little, and [Fauxlivia]'s mum is still around. There's lots of little, subtle differences."

The producers discussed cutting her hair, but ultimately decided on the auburn hair color to differentiate her. They also made her "a little bit more playful". Pinkner describes shooting the Fauxlivia scenes in the DVD audio commentary: "When [Torv] first showed up on set in this different guise, she had really embodied this other character in a very playful and sexy way. She turned a lot of heads." Goldsman remarked that Torv's depiction of Fauxlivia was actually much closer to the actress' real personality than her performance as Olivia. The producers were so pleased with her Fauxlivia depiction that they thought "it really opened up a bunch of possibilities ... it went from 'let's see if this experiment works' to 'how can we get more of this?'"

== Reception ==
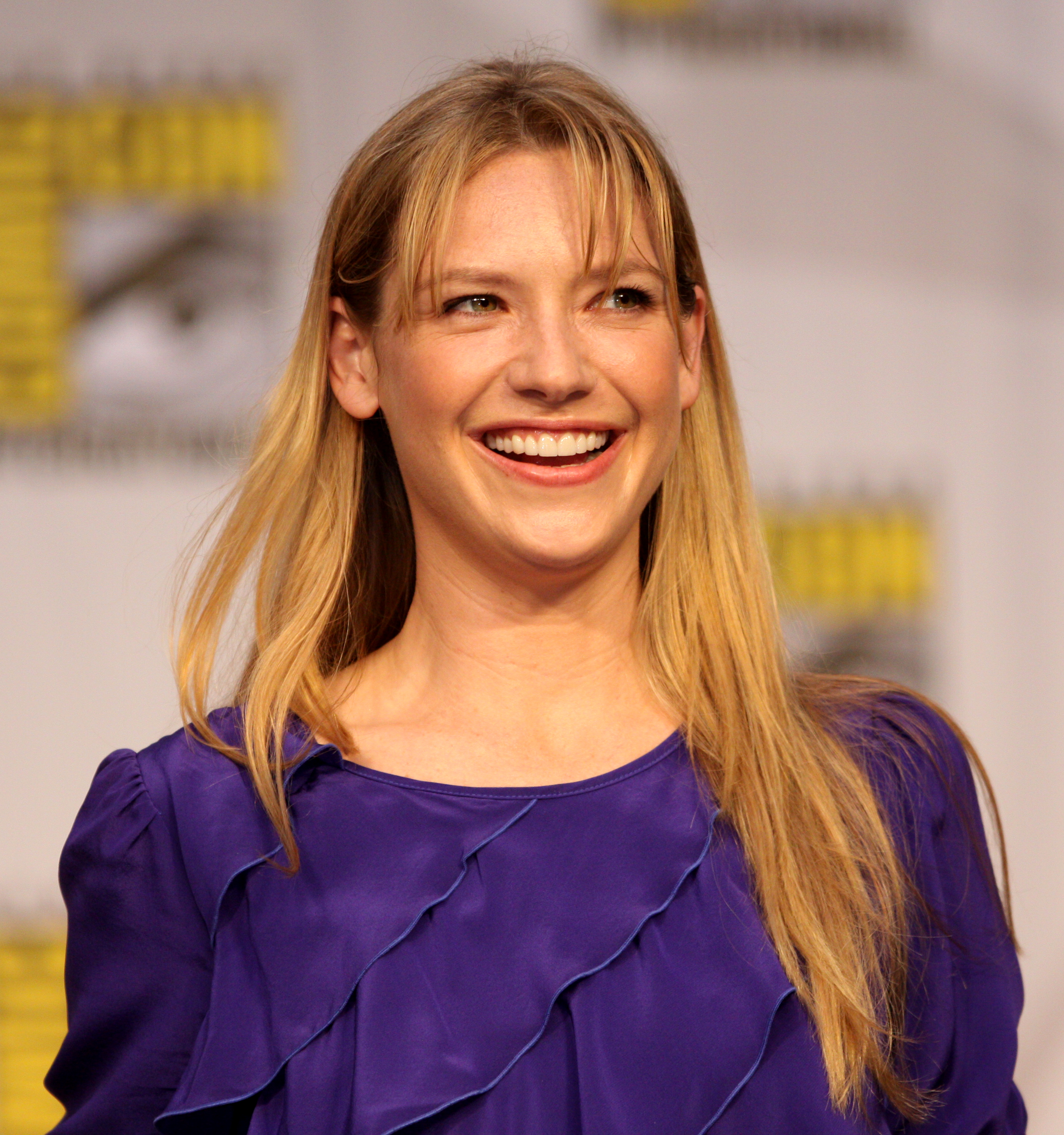
Anna Torv's performance ultimately resulted in favorable reviews from television critics

The character and Torv's performance received overall generally positive reviews, although the response to Anna Torv's performance in the first season was mixed. In his review of the pilot episode for New York, John Leonarwas found Torv "wonderfully played" her character. IGN's Travis Fickett agreed, calling Torv's early work on Fringe "very good" as she "brings a unique presence to the show." MSNBC was equally praiseworthy of Torv and her character, writing "Olivia is the soul of the show — two-fisted and defiant, yet vulnerable. Torv knows how to convey authenticity, even in the midst of an outrageous scene. And sporting sensible pantsuits and just a hint of makeup, she makes Olivia a plausibly gorgeous pro, not a crime-busting tootsie." Conversely, SFScope columnist Sarah Stegall believed Torv's early performance to be "downright wooden", while others criticized the actress and character for being "cold and distant." The New York Observer found her to be the one weak link of the main cast, criticizing Torv for her accent and for showing "less emotion than a piece of plywood."

In a response to some early negative reactions to the actress' performance, Jon Lachonis noted in a review of the first season's seventh episode that "Anna Torv, whose chill portrayal of FBI agent and Pattern investigator Olivia Dunham has come under fire for being too wooden, seems to have reinvented her character to answer the critics. The good news is, Anna's new and more animated Olivia isn't really a departure so much as it is a character who seems to have had a catharsis. She is comfortable in her skin now, and the stillness is pulled back in favor of more humanity." Executive producers Jeff Pinkner and J.H. Wyman defended Torv's early Fringe work in a 2011 interview, explaining the character was designed to be "bland, because of her conditioning as a child and everything she's been through. Now, one can argue that maybe that wasn't the best way for us to introduce the main character, but there was a purpose. So Anna had to listen to all these people saying 'She's really doing nothing,' when really it was our issue. We didn't write anything for her because... well, now you know why. But at the time, people were like, 'Wow, this girl really is not much,' which is so not true. Anna was just so professional, and so great. She did it with excellence, and now she's really getting the chance to show people, 'Hey, I'm a really hard worker and a terrific actor.' We're so thankful that people can start to see her for who she really is. Midway through the second season, Sarah Stegall from SFScope believed Torv "had the most progress and the most satisfying development" of all the main actors, stating she "is now carrying this role with grace and strength". Stegall partly attributed the growth of the actor and character to her recovery early in the second season, the introduction of a sister and niece, the removal of John Scott from her storyline, and the "delicate, reserved flirtation" with Peter.

Torv's double duty as Olivia and Fauxlivia late in the second season and throughout the third and fourth seasons received almost universal critical acclaim. TV Guide called it one of the best performances of the year, explaining "Switching Olivia with her alternate-universe self... jump-started the show's interpersonal dynamics — and changed the way we look at Torv. Her take on [Fauxlivia] added many new colors to the characters, including malice, humor and sensuality. In a 2010 list, Time Magazine's James Poniewozik called Torv's performance one of television's best of the year. He explained, "... in the dual role of Olivia/Fauxlivia, Torv absolutely came into her own this year. While some credit goes to the writing, it was Torv's shaded performance that sold Olivia's alternate-universe twin as an actual separate person—not just a cartoon villain version of the original, but a real person, a little more assertive and confident, and just a touch rapacious. Meanwhile, she convincingly portrayed the trauma and confusion of her captured-then-returned Olivia, whose emotional (and complicated) reunion with Peter made an outlandish situation real and moving."

Dunham was named one of TV's Smartest Detectives by AOL TV. She was listed in AfterEllen.com's Top 50 Favorite Female TV Characters.

=== Accolades ===
Anna Torv has both been nominated and won a number of international awards. At the 2009 Australians in Film Awards, Torv won the Breakthrough Award. She received a nomination at the 2009 Teen Choice Awards for Breakout Star Female, but lost to Demi Lovato. Torv received three nominations at the Teen Choice Awards for Choice TV Actress: Fantasy/Sci-Fi in 2010, 2011, and 2012. At the Saturn Awards, Torv has been nominated each year for her performance during the first four seasons of the series, ultimately being awarded at the 2010, 2011, 2012 and 2013 ceremonies, becoming the only actress to win four consecutive awards in that specific category for a television series. In 2011, for her work in the third season, Torv was nominated for the Critics' Choice Television Award for Best Lead Actress in a Drama Series at the 1st Critics' Choice Television Awards.
