= John Noble =

Australian actor (born 1948)

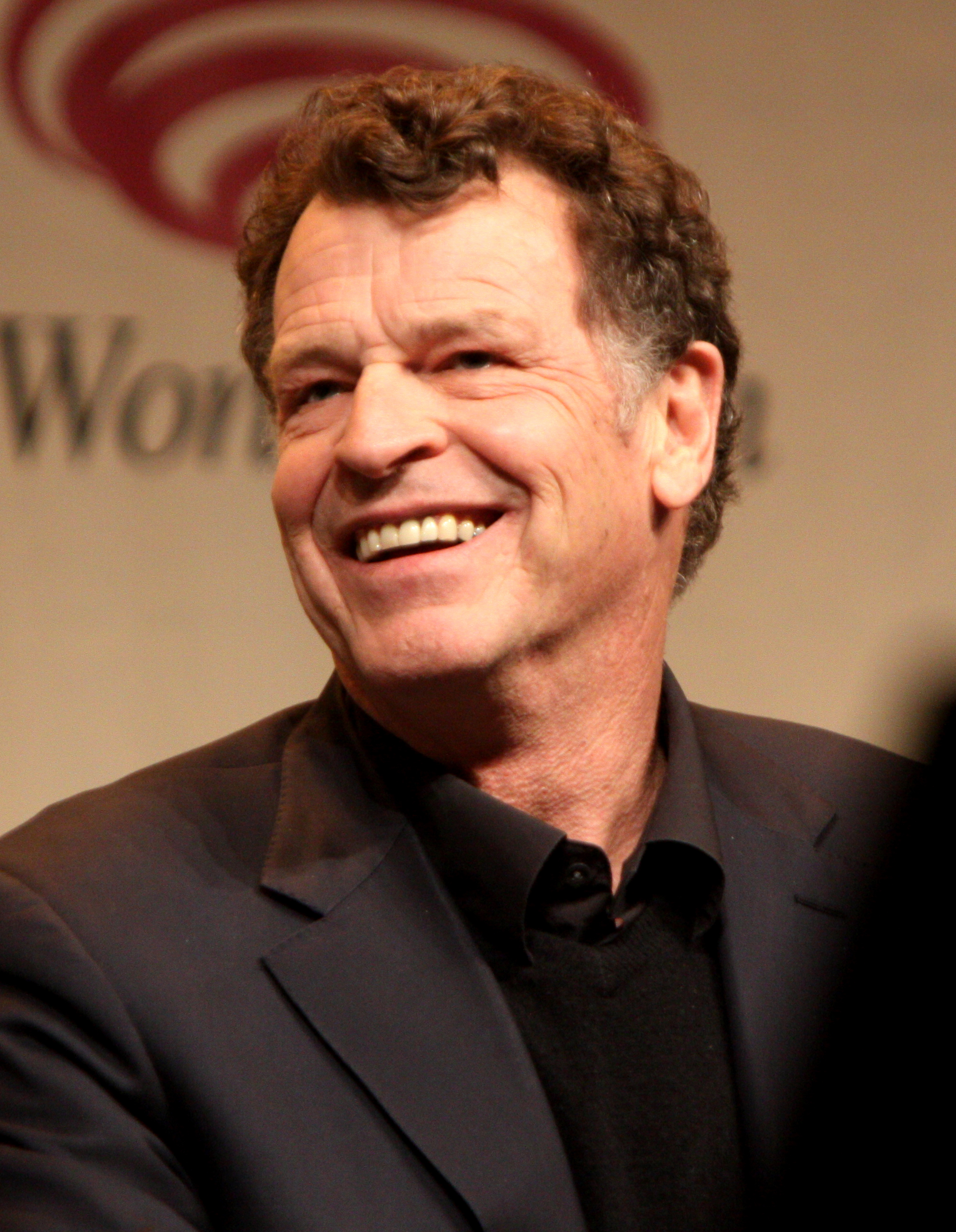
- Noble in 2012
- Occupations: Actor; voice actor; theatre director
- Years active: 1988–present
- Spouse: Penny Noble
- Children: 3, including Samantha Noble

John Noble is an Australian actor. He is best known for his roles as Denethor in The Lord of the Rings film trilogy (2001–2003), and Dr. Walter Bishop in the Fox science fiction series Fringe (2008–2013). His other television credits include the supernatural drama Sleepy Hollow (2013–2017) and the police procedural Elementary (2015–2019). Noble has also lent his distinctively deep voice to animated and video game projects, most notably as Leland Monroe in Rockstar Games' L.A. Noire (2011), Unicron in the animated series Transformers: Prime (2010–2013), and Scarecrow in Rocksteady's Batman: Arkham Knight (2015).

== Career ==
Noble's early acting career started in theater throughout the 1970s and 1980s. For 10 years, he was an artistic director for the Stage Company of South Australia. Noble was a Trustee of the Adelaide Festival Centre and chairman of the Adelaide Festival of the Arts. In 1979, he starred in Errol Flynn's Great Big Adventure Book for Boys at the Edinburgh Festival in Scotland. In 1984, Noble received a nomination by South Australian Premier John Bannon, for the Young Australian of the Year award.

Noble at age 40 made his film debut in the 1988 horror film The Dreaming.

Noble made occasional appearances on the television series All Saints. His performance as Denethor, son of Ecthelion, in The Lord of the Rings trilogy resulted in his becoming better known to international audiences. He played Russian Consul Anatoly Markov in the sixth season of the US television series 24.

Noble won awards when starring as eccentric scientist Walter Bishop in the television series Fringe for 5 seasons (2008–2013). Noble played Morland Holmes, father of Sherlock Holmes, in Elementary. He was a series regular for season 4 with guest appearances in seasons 6 and 7.

Noble has also done voice acting, usually portraying villains. He voiced the Dragon Spirit in M. Night Shyamalan's film The Last Airbender (2010), appeared as Real Estate tycoon Leland Monroe in Rockstar Games' L.A. Noire (2011), and provided the voice for Unicron in the animated series Transformers: Prime and its conclusion film Transformers Prime Beast Hunters: Predacons Rising. Noble also voiced the Diviner in the 2021 animated series Star Trek: Prodigy. In 2024, he played an alternate version of the Diviner called Ilthuran.

Noble has done voice-over work for numerous DC Comics projects, including the animated film Superman: Unbound (2013) as the supervillain Brainiac, the video game Batman: Arkham Knight (2015) as the primary antagonist Scarecrow, and the television series Legends of Tomorrow as the demon Mallus. Additionally, Noble appeared as himself in the Legends of Tomorrow episode "Guest Starring John Noble".

On 21 February 2025 Noble made his debut on season two of the Apple TV+ show Severance in the sixth episode, titled "Attila", playing the role of a character named Cecil Fields. Fields is a homosexual man who is married to Christopher Walken's character, Burt Goodman, who is often identified as "Burt G."

== Personal life ==
Noble divides his time between residences in New York City and Sydney, Australia, with wife Penny Noble. They have three children, including actress Samantha Noble. In 2011, Noble's hobbies were reported to be "music, painting, and narration". He studies theoretical physics and requested that the writers of Fringe always keep things grounded in what could be scientifically feasible.

In 2012, Noble was diagnosed with osteoporosis. His charity, Noble Bones, helps to raise awareness of the disease.

== Filmography ==
=== Film ===
Year	Title	Role	Notes
1988	The Dreaming	Dr. Richards	
1989	A Sting in the Tale	Prime Minister's minder	
1990	Call Me Mr. Brown	Sergeant	
1993	The Nostradamus Kid	General Booth	
2000	The Monkey's Mask	Mr. Norris	
2002	The Lord of the Rings: The Two Towers	Denethor	Seen only in the extended edition
2003	The Lord of the Rings: The Return of the King	Denethor	Broadcast Film Critics Association Award for Best Cast; Critics Choice Award for Best Acting Ensemble; National Board of Review Award for Best Cast; Screen Actors Guild Award for Outstanding Performance by a Cast in a Motion Picture; Nominated—Phoenix Film Critics Society Award for Best Cast
2004	Fracture	Howard Peet	
2006	One Night with the King	Prince Admantha	
2006	Running Scared	Ivan Yugorsky	
2006	Voodoo Lagoon	Ben	
2010	Risen	Eddie Thomas	
2010	The Last Airbender	Dragon Spirit	Voice Nominated—Golden Raspberry Award for Worst Screen Ensemble (shared with the entire cast)
2013	Superman: Unbound	Brainiac	Voice, direct-to-video
2014	The Mule	Pat Shepherd	
2021	The Conjuring: The Devil Made Me Do It	Father Kastner	

=== Television ===
Year	Title	Role	Notes
1991	Police Rescue	Sergeant	Episode: "Hostage"
1993	Time Trax	Mr. Michaels	Episode: "One on One"
1997	Big Sky	Graham James	Episode: "Future Past and Present"
1998	Water Rats	Dr. Harry	Episode: "Epiphany"
1998–2004	All Saints	Dr. John Madsen	32 episodes
1999	Airtight	Sorrentino	Television film
2000	Tales of the South Seas	Christian Ambrose	Episode: "Trent in Love"
2000	Virtual Nightmare	Dad	Television film
2001	Sir Arthur Conan Doyle's The Lost World	Inspector Robert Anderson	Episode: "The Knife"
2001	The Bill	Commander Warren	Episode: "Beech on the Run"
2001–2006	Home and Away	Dr. Helpman	9 episodes
2002	Young Lions	Adam Gallagher	4 episodes
2002	Stingers	Michael Kranz	Episode: "Disgraceful Conduct"
2002	The Outsider	Fergus Hunter	Television film
2004	The Mystery of Natalie Wood	Irving Pichel	Television film
2002	Superfire	Paul Baylis	Television film
2006	Stargate SG-1	Meurik	Episode: "Camelot"
2007	Journeyman	Wine Connoisseur	Episode: "Winterland"
2007	The Unit	The CEO	Episode: "Pandemonium—Part 2"
2007	24	Anatoly Markov	3 episodes
2007	Pirate Islands: The Lost Treasure of Fiji	Blackheart	13 episodes
2008–2013	Fringe	Walter Bishop / Walternate	100 episodes Critics' Choice Television Award for Best Supporting Actor in a Drama Series; Saturn Award for Best Supporting Actor on Television; Nominated—Critics' Choice Television Award for Best Supporting Actor in a Drama Series; Nominated—Satellite Award for Best Supporting Actor – Series, Miniseries or Television Film (2008–09); Nominated—Saturn Award for Best Supporting Actor on Television (2010, 2012–13)
2011–2012	Dark Matters: Twisted But True	Himself	16 episodes
2011	Transformers: Prime	Unicron	Voice, 3 episodes
2013	The Good Wife	Matthew Ashbaugh	2 episodes
2013	Transformers Prime Beast Hunters: Predacons Rising	Unicron	Voice, television film
2013–2017	Sleepy Hollow	Henry Parrish	22 episodes
2013	Miss Fisher's Murder Mysteries	Edward Stanley	Episode: "Murder Under The Mistletoe"
2014	Rake	Clayton Post	2 episodes
2014	Devil's Playground	Bishop McNally	6 episodes
2015	Forever	Aubrey Griffin	Episode: "The Last Death of Henry Morgan"
2015–2019	Elementary	Morland Holmes	16 episodes
2017–2018	Legends of Tomorrow	Mallus, himself	7 episodes
2017–2018	Salvation	Nicholas Tanz	7 episodes
2017	The Librarians	Monsignor Vega	Episode: "And the Dark Secret", season 4
2018	The Blacklist	Raleigh Sinclair III	2 episodes
2019	The Resident	Elliot Festervan	Episode: "Broker and Broker"
2020	Hunters	Frederic Hauser	Episode: "The Pious Thieves"
2020–2026	The Boys	Sam Butcher	2 episodes
2021	Debris	Otto	Episode: "Celestial Body"
2021–2024	Star Trek: Prodigy	The Diviner / Ilthuran	Voice; 28 episodes
2021	Cowboy Bebop	Caliban	3 episodes
2023	Totally Completely Fine	Wilkinson	3 episodes
2023	Fired on Mars	Falco	Voice; episode: "Marsiversary"
2024	Twilight of the Gods	Odin	Voice role
2025	Severance	Fields	Season 2
2026	The Last Thing He Told Me	Frank Campano	3 episodes

=== Video games ===
Year	Title	Voice role	Notes
2009	The Saboteur	Bishop	
2011	L.A. Noire	Leland Monroe	
2013	Infinity Blade III	The Worker of Secrets	
2015	Batman: Arkham Knight	Jonathan Crane / Scarecrow	

== Other work ==
- Artistic Director of Stage Company of South Australia 1977–1987
- Head of Drama, Brent St. School of Arts (Sydney) 1997–2000

== Awards and nominations ==
Year	Association	Category	Nominated work	Result
2003	National Board of Review	Best Cast	The Lord of the Rings: The Return of the King	Won
2004	Broadcast Film Critics Association Awards	Best Cast	The Lord of the Rings: The Return of the King	Won
2004	Critics' Choice Awards	Best Cast	The Lord of the Rings: The Return of the King	Won
2004	Phoenix Film Critics Society Awards	Best Cast	The Lord of the Rings: The Return of the King	Nominated
2004	Screen Actors Guild Awards	Outstanding Performance by a Cast in a Motion Picture	The Lord of the Rings: The Return of the King	Won
2008	Satellite Awards	Best Supporting Actor – Series, Miniseries or Television Film	Fringe	Nominated
2009	Satellite Awards	Best Supporting Actor – Series, Miniseries or Television Film	Fringe	Nominated
2010	Saturn Awards	Best Supporting Actor on Television	Fringe	Nominated
2011	Critics' Choice Television Awards	Best Supporting Actor in a Drama Series	Fringe	Won
2011	Saturn Awards	Best Supporting Actor on Television	Fringe	Won
2012	Critics' Choice Television Awards	Best Supporting Actor in a Drama Series	Fringe	Nominated
2012	Saturn Awards	Best Supporting Actor on Television	Fringe	Nominated
2013	Saturn Awards	Best Supporting Actor on Television	Fringe	Nominated
2016	15th National Academy of Video Game Trade Reviewers (NAVGTR) awards	Performance in a Drama, Supporting (as "Scarecrow")	Batman: Arkham Knight	Nominated
