= Snakehead (Fringe) =

- Fringe episode
- In the opening scene, a large parasitic worm erupts from a man's face
- Episode no.: Season 2 Episode 9
- Directed by: Paul Holahan
- Written by: David Wilcox
- Production code: 3X5109
- Original air date: December 3, 2009

Guest appearances
- Tzi Ma as Ming Che; Colby Paul as Matt Jarvis; Ingrid Torrance as Elizabeth Jarvis; Jack Yang as Tao Chen

Episode chronology
← Previous "August"	Next → "Grey Matters"
- Fringe season 2

"Snakehead" is the ninth episode of the second season of the American science fiction drama television series Fringe. The episode followed the Fringe team's investigation into horrible deaths caused by large parasitic worms erupting from their victims' mouths. The case soon leads them to a Chinese gang and a black market of immunodeficiency medicinal drugs.

Co-executive producer David Wilcox wrote the episode, while Paul Holahan served as its director. Andrew Orloff, the episode's visual effects supervisor, strived to makes the parasitic worms look as real as possible with the help of the actors and camera angles. It featured one-time guest stars Tzi Ma, Colby Paul, Ingrid Torrance and Jack Yang.

"Snakehead" first aired on December 3, 2009, to an estimated 6.94 million viewers in the United States. Reviews of the episode were generally negative, as multiple critics expressed their dissatisfaction that little was learned about the series' overall mythology.

== Plot ==
In Dorchester, a damaged cargo ship from China washes ashore; all of the crew members seem to be infected with squid-like creatures which soon erupt from their mouths, effectively killing their hosts. Other survivors flock to a contact house in Boston's Chinatown, only to suffer the same fate in the presence of a man (Tzi Ma). While investigating the crime scene shore, the Fringe team discover a healthy young Chinese woman, who tells them all of the passengers but her were given pills for their perceived seasickness, and that another ship is expected in two days. In the lab, Walter (John Noble) posits the creatures are gigantic parasitic worms, a modified version of Ancylostoma duodenale, that needs hosts for their gestation period, hence the distribution of parasitic pills. One of the still-living worms bites Walter, boosting his white blood cell count and making him suddenly feel better.

The Fringe team discovers a Triad gang member and ties to several shell companies the gang has set up in the US. They interview Elizabeth Jarvis (Ingrid Torrance), one of the companies' large investors, but she seems unaware of her investment's criminal background. While at her house, Peter (Joshua Jackson) observes signs of obsessive compulsive and germaphobe characteristics such as large quantities of hand sanitizer. Walter informs him the worm has a medicinal purpose, not a narcotic one as they previously believed. These two discoveries lead Peter and Olivia (Anna Torv) back to Jarvis' house, and they learn that her son (Colby Paul) has an immunodeficiency disorder. To allow him to be able to go outside, his mother and doctor have been giving him an injection to his spleen once a month, though he is unaware of the medicine's origins.

Meanwhile, an invigorated Walter ventures out to Chinatown to find a herbalist for his research; unaware of the clerk's connection to the case, Walter casually mentions the giant worms. Walter manages to lose Astrid (Jasika Nicole), who was sent to follow him out of worry for his ability to travel alone. She goes back to the lab, but is attacked by Triad gang members intent on getting back the remaining worms. Unaware of this, a distraught Walter becomes lost and wastes all his bus money on wrong phone numbers, causing Peter to have to pick him up. Olivia talks to Jarvis, who finally admits to being aware of the medicine. She tells Olivia the whereabouts of the incoming ship, but they find it already empty. Peter and Walter return to the herbalist shop and discover the remaining passengers. The FBI storms in and the survivors are sent to the hospital for care. Feeling remorseful about the trouble he caused, Walter injects himself with a tracking implant and gives Peter the transponder.

== Production ==
"[It] has really opened us up to doing more hands-on creature and body work, where you just know that the corpse and creatures work seamlessly with what we're doing. That's what I like most about episode nine with the parasite that came out of the body. We had such a good parasite to work with that we were able to design and execute a [better result]."

— Visual effects supervisor Jay Worth

"Snakehead" was written by co-executive producer David Wilcox, who had also written the season's third episode, "Fracture". The episode gave television director Paul Holahan his first directional credit for the series. The episode featured one-time guest appearances by actors Tzi Ma as Ming Che, Colby Paul as Matt Jarvis, Ingrid Torrance as Elizabeth Jarvis, and Jack Yang as Tao Chen.

The episode's visual effects supervisor, Andrew Orloff of Zoic Studios tried to make the parasitic worms look as real as possible. He explained, "...we just don't have any shots that seemed staged for the camera or any hint of being a visual effect. One of the big effects, like the parasite that crawls out of the guy's mouth, are interacting with actor's performances and they're shot with a very loose camera style and we have to have the tentacles of this creature coming out of the guy's mouth and all the deformations that are in his stomach and in his throat and in his chest." Orloff continued, "And we had to create a proprietary workflow here of what we're calling performance transfer of tracking 2D points, and putting those 2D tracked points onto the formation of 3D inter-geometry. So we're transferring not just the camera motion but also the performance of the actors on set onto 3D pieces of geometry so we can deform them and warp them and have our effects interact with them because the mandate is all about making it look as natural as possible, so that means a lot of optical tricks and atmosphere put in as seamlessly as possible."

== Reception ==
=== Ratings ===
"Snakehead" first aired on December 3, 2009, in the United States. It was watched by an estimated 6.94 million viewers, earning a 4.2/7 household ratings share and a 2.5/7 ratings share for the 18–49 demographic. Fringe aired against repeats of Grey's Anatomy and CSI: Crime Scene Investigation, helping the series earn a 25 percent ratings increase since the season premiere.

=== Reviews ===
"Fringe sure has a pattern alright — take one excellent plot-propelling episode and follow it up with a complete waste of time. The only worthwhile development in 'Snakehead' was Walter's decision to place a tracking implant in his neck, which will undoubtedly pay off in a future episode. Aside from that, some solid performances and a gag-inducing mystery of the week, the latest Fringe episode was entirely pointless in the grand scheme of things."

— MTV columnist Josh Wigler

Critical reception for the episode was generally negative. MTV writer Josh Wigler noted the week's Fringe case for "delivering an absolutely grotesque mystery of the week — even if the actual plot surrounding the worms was thin and unimportant in the long run". He believed the best part of the episode was John Noble's performance, as "he kills you with laughter just as easily as he kills you with tears," but disliked the focus on Astrid, believing the focus would have been better spent on Olivia. Ken Tucker from Entertainment Weekly called the case "pretty X-Files-ish" and Walter's storyline "the true heart of the hour." Other critics also spotlighted Noble's acting. AOL TV's Jane Boursaw believed the worms were "seriously freaky" and the opening scene "cringe"-worthy. Writing for the magazine New York, critic Tim Grierson called the focus on Walter the episode's best moments, but wrote that after the audience "adjusted to the ew factor, the plot wasn't all that interesting. The story line about rich, ailing Americans paying Chinese gangsters for miracle cures appeared to be a ripped-from-the-headlines commentary on hot-button issues like human trafficking and illegal immigration, but the execution just seemed silly."

Conversely, Noel Murray of The A.V. Club graded "Snakehead" with a B+, explaining the focus on Walter was a "smart choice by the Fringe team thematically". Murray continued, "Ordinarily I'd be griping that this episode was yet another mythology-free time-waster, with a plot that—two-foot-long parasites aside—could be passed along to any other procedural show currently on the air. But I really enjoyed 'Snakehead,' both because of the way the story reflected who Walter is and because of all the little touches of character development and scene-setting.

Though not appearing as depicted, the species is a real-world hookworm that infects a large number of Earth's population, which as said in the episode, has been used by some as an alternative treatment for asthma and other allergies. Popular Mechanics published an article assessing the episode's science; they concluded that the worms depicted in "Snakehead" -- "hybrid parasites, a new species bio-engineered from an intestinal hookworm"—cannot grow as quickly nor as large in real life, though it is possible for hosts to die from "parasitic asphyxiation". A George Washington University Medical School doctor noted that some scientists are researching the healing potential of parasitic worms.
