= The Box (Fringe) =

- Fringe episode
- Fauxlivia seduces Peter to distract him in order to hide the corpse in her bathroom.
- Episode no.: Season 3 Episode 2
- Directed by: Jeffrey Hunt
- Written by: Josh Singer; Graham Roland
- Production code: 3X6102
- Original air date: September 30, 2010

Guest appearances
- Michael Cerveris as the Observer; Sebastian Roché as Thomas Jerome Newton; Eric Lynch as a homeless man; Russell Harvard as Joe

Episode chronology
← Previous "Olivia"	Next → "The Plateau"
- Fringe season 3

"The Box" is the second episode of the third season of the American science fiction drama television series Fringe. The episode was co-written by Josh Singer and Graham Roland, and directed by Jeffrey Hunt. The third season spent its time alternating between the prime and parallel universes, and "The Box" was set in the former. It followed a mysterious box that when opened, killed whoever heard it. The fringe team of Fauxlivia (a doppelgänger of Olivia Dunham), Peter, and Walter investigate, with unknown consequences to the creation of a doomsday device.

It first aired on September 30, 2010, in the United States to an estimated 5.24 million viewers, helping the Fox network finish in fourth place for the night. The episode received generally positive reviews, and it was described as a "strong start" and "chock full of good stuff" by various critics. "The Box" was nominated by Motion Picture Sound Editors for the 2011 Golden Reel Awards but lost to an episode of Boardwalk Empire.

== Plot ==
In the prime universe (aka "Our Side"), the parallel universe's Olivia — "Fauxlivia" — (Anna Torv); meets with Thomas Jerome Newton (Sebastian Roché), who provides Fauxlivia several dossiers and books to help her acclimate herself to the prime universe's version of the Fringe team. Through them, she is able to successfully impersonate the prime universe's Olivia to Walter (John Noble) and Peter (Joshua Jackson), and joins the ranks of the Fringe division. Her first case on the team is at a house in Milton, Massachusetts. At first it appears to have been a robbery, with the family tied up and two thieves having dug a hole in the basement; however, all of the people are dead due to being placed into a vegetative state. Walter believes that a third thief took whatever was uncovered in the hole, but is somehow unaffected by its presence. On examining the corpses, Walter determines that the people were exposed to an ultrasound signal, likely generated by the object that was stolen.

Meanwhile, they discover the identity of one of the dead robbers, Blake, and learn of his abandoned apartment. Fauxlivia goes to the apartment alone without alerting Peter, but Peter soon joins her. The two find that Blake had a roommate, likely the third man, but he is nowhere to be seen. That night, while at Olivia's apartment, Fauxlivia studies Olivia's case files, and comments of her prime counterpart, "You have a photographic memory. How am I gonna do that?" indicating that she does not possess this ability. A moment later she is visited by the third man, Joe (Russell Harvard), who had seen Fauxlivia at Blake's apartment and, believing her to be a cop, brought the item stolen from the Milton home - a small box. Fauxlivia finds Joe is deaf, and thus was unaffected by the ultrasonics of the box. Fauxlivia contacts Newton, who collects the box — having originally hired the men to collect it for him — and offers to kill the deaf man. Fauxlivia tells him she will take care of things herself and shoots the deaf man. While hiding the body, Peter arrives to talk to her. To distract him and prevent him from noticing a pool of blood seeping under the bathroom door, Fauxlivia engages in romantic actions with Peter.

Newton takes the box to a crowded subway station, and entices a homeless man (Eric Lynch) to watch the box for a short while, expecting the person to steal it after he leaves. The Fringe team is soon on the scene having discovered the ultrasound signal, and find all of the passengers at the station are dead. They find no evidence of the box, and fear that someone took it into the tunnels and may still be active; the ultrasound would kill everyone on any train that passed. Peter offers to go find the box, and Walter has the idea to make Peter momentarily deaf by having Fauxlivia fire her gun next to Peter's ears. He finds the box, its lid cracked, in the dead hands of the homeless man (whose head promptly explodes). Without a way to seal the lid, Peter is forced to try to defuse the box. He does so in time before his hearing returns, but cannot hear the warning of an errant train bearing down on him; Fauxlivia enters the tunnels to save Peter. After recovering, Peter and Walter surmise the box is part of the machine, and Peter begins studying it. On her own, Fauxlivia contacts the parallel world through the typewriter shop, informing them that Peter "has the first piece" and is now "engaged".

In a side plot, William Bell is officially declared dead, and his will is read to Nina (Blair Brown) and Walter. Walter is hesitant about opening the envelope left for him, but Astrid (Jasika Nicole) assures him of William's friendship. Ultimately, Walter finds the envelope contains a typewritten note reading "Don't be afraid to cross the line," and a key to a safe deposit box, containing the entirety of the shares of Bell's multi-billion dollar biomedical technology corporation Massive Dynamic, making Walter the sole owner.

== Production ==
"The Box" was co-written by co-executive producer Josh Singer and executive story editor Graham Roland, while being directed by CSI: Crime Scene Investigation veteran Jeffrey Hunt. The episode was shot in the second half of July 2010. Hunt later tweeted on-set photos in January 2011. At San Diego Comic-Con during the summer leading up to the season premiere, actress Jasika Nicole told the audience they would finally be able to see her character's apartment, which has previously been only alluded to in an early season two episode. She explained, "It's really neat! There's all these tiny little things that give you insight into how things are. I know the color of (Astrid's) walls, so watch out!"

In early August 2010, Entertainment Weekly reported that Eric the Actor, from The Howard Stern Show, had been cast for a small role in the new season's second episode. Deaf actor Russell Harvard portrayed Joe, a man who is able to survive the box being opened only to be killed by Fauxlivia. Harvard later commented in an interview, "Fringe was so much fun and not even stressful compared to [professional fighting film] Hamill. It was very fast and rapid. Playing the dead guy was very easy. Working with Anna Torv was so much fun, she is a great, great actress and very sweet. I did not think she would be that kind of person." He continued, "There was a stunt which she did not want to do herself, but I told her 'You want to be authentic so I want you to pull me,' so she obliged. It was a great experience and so much fun and I wish I could have stayed on the show for a long time."

As with other Fringe episodes, Fox released a science lesson plan in collaboration with Science Olympiad for grade school children focusing on the science seen in "The Box", with the intention of having "students learn about the different characteristics of music and how it can have physiological effects on the listener."

== Cultural references ==
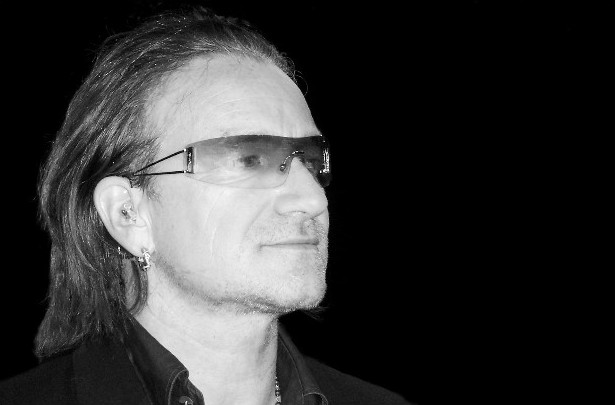
Fauxlivia implies that U2 lead singer Bono is not well known in the parallel universe.

When researching popular culture in the prime universe, Fauxlivia says "Who's Bono?" (pronouncing it "bone-oh"), implying Irish rock band U2 and its lead singer Bono either do not exist in the parallel universe, or are not well known. Fauxlivia also mentions liking a song by country music singer Patsy Cline when she and Peter hear it playing in a bar, suggesting either that Cline is famous in both universes, or that Fauxlivia had further studied pop culture of the prime universe before her conversation with Peter. Peter tells Fauxlivia that living with Walter is like a bad buddy cop movie, referring to a genre of movies that have two men of very different and conflicting personalities forced to work together.

== Reception ==
=== Ratings ===
"The Box" first aired on September 30, 2010, in the United States on the Fox network. According to the Nielsen ratings system, it was watched by an estimated 5.24 million viewers and earned a 1.9/5 ratings share among adults 18 to 49. Fox finished in fourth place for the night, though time shifted viewings increased the episode's ratings by 42 percent in the adult demographic, from 1.9 to a 2.7 rating.

=== Reviews ===
"Fringe stays on its recent winning streak with 'The Box'... It's not as bracing as last week's 'Olivia,' but that's mainly because the curious differences of Earth-2 bring a little extra juice to any scene set there, while investigations into the paranormal on our less fanciful Earth-1 are more familiar. Still, at least the paranormal incident in 'The Box' ties into the master-plot about the coming war of the worlds (and the respective places of Olivia Dunham and her Faux in that war)"

— The A.V. Club writer Noel Murray

"The Box" received mostly positive reviews. Salon.com gave the episode an A−, explaining "this week's episode was chock full of good stuff. We get some more fun nuggets about how Earth 2 differs from Earth 1... Your Bose headphones cannot protect you from the awesome sonic power of "The Box". UGO Networks' Alex Zalben wrote "Two weeks in, Fringe is still the best damn show currently on TV". Zalben loved the serial aspects of the plot, praised Anna Torv's performance, but disliked how no one has realized Fauxlivia's true identity. Josh Wigler from MTV enjoyed the episode particularly because although he found the parallel universe a "compelling world, sometimes it's nice to just kick your feet up on the table and know that you're home... Two episodes down, and it's safe to say that the third season of "Fringe" is off to a very strong start". Ken Tucker of Entertainment Weekly thought it was a terrific episode, with "a tremendously clever game-changer of an ending...This Fringe was a good example of how far the series has come since its first season, dominated by pre-credits scare-scenarios for Fringe Division to investigate, some of which spilled over into the show's mythology. Now, Fringe is a seamless whole".

The A.V. Club's Noel Murray graded it with a B+. SFScope contributor Sarah Stegall wrote, "Tightly written, well acted, and directed with a sure hand, this second episode of the season bears out my original prediction: this year is going to rock." Andrew Hanson from the Los Angeles Times praised the episode's use of a "Harold", in which three separate plots working off a central theme converge together. He also loved the climactic scene involving a gunshot-induced deaf Peter and the subway. "I hope more people were watching this episode for so many reasons: To see how good "Fringe" has become, to get addicted to the show and, most important, to see that they quoted my blog in the promo for next week. Thursday night has become "Fringe" night".

=== Awards and nominations ===
"The Box" was nominated for Best Sound Editing: TV Short Form Music by the Motion Picture Sound Editors for the 2011 Golden Reel Awards. The crew included Supervising Music Editor Paul Apelgren, composers Chris Tilton and Michael Giacchino, and re-recording mixer Rick Norman. "Brown Betty", a season two Fringe episode, was also nominated for Best Sound Editing: TV Short Form Music in a Musical. "The Box" lost to the Boardwalk Empire episode "Anastasia".
