= Dream Logic =

- Fringe episode
- In the opening scene, a man hallucinates his boss as a deformed monster, leading to the boss' murder
- Episode no.: Season 2 Episode 5
- Directed by: Paul A. Edwards
- Written by: Josh Singer
- Production code: 3X5105
- Original air date: October 15, 2009

Guest appearances
- Kevin Corrigan as Sam Weiss; Ravi Kapoor as Dr. Nayak; Travis Schuldt as Agent Kashner; Michael Cerveris as the Observer; Stephen Dimopoulos as Mr. Lamia; Steven Garr as Rob Rosiello; Nico Ghisi as Young Peter; Emily Holmes as Jill Leiter; Jovanna Huguet as Diana Lamia; Jarrett Knowles as Zach Miller; Drew Nelson as Carl Langdon; Jim Thorburn as Greg Leiter; Alex Zahara as Detective Green

Episode chronology
← Previous "Momentum Deferred"	Next → "Earthling"
- Fringe season 2

"Dream Logic" is the fifth episode of the second season of the American science fiction drama television series Fringe, and the 25th episode overall. It was written by Josh Singer and directed by Paul A. Edwards. The episode follows several people seemingly dreaming while still awake, leading the Fringe team to investigate the dangerous side effects of a sleep study.

On its initial American broadcast on October 15, 2009 on the Fox network, "Dream Logic" was watched by an estimated 5.78 million viewers. It received mixed reviews, with multiple critics noting it was considerably worse in quality than the previous week's episode while at the same time praising the case's ties to Peter's past as well as the return of Sam Weiss.

== Plot ==
In Seattle a man named Greg Leiter (Jim Thorburn) hallucinates that his boss and coworkers are demons, leading Greg to attack and murder the boss. Greg is hospitalized and falls asleep for sixteen hours; when Olivia (Anna Torv) and Peter (Joshua Jackson) interview him in the hospital, he tells them his boss was a demon out of a bad dream before suffering a seizure and having his hair turn white. Walter (John Noble) posits that Greg died from "acute exhaustion". However, believing Seattle to be like the mental institution, Walter desires to go home to Boston and run tests on the corpse from there.

Olivia and Peter learn Greg was being treated for a sleep disorder, and that his dreams had involved demons until they stopped several months ago. Another hallucinating victim turns up in Seattle and dies. The Fringe team discover that both victims had a brain–computer interface chip attached to their thalamus, the part of the brain controlling dreams. Broyles (Lance Reddick) and Nina (Blair Brown) reveal new information leading to the sleep researcher Dr. Nayak (Ravi Kapoor) who implanted the chips. Another victim named Diana (Jovanna Huguet) hallucinates at a restaurant and kills a coworker before similarly dying of exhaustion.

Olivia and Peter first suspect Dr. Nayak's research assistant Zach (Jarrett Knowles) but find him dead. Back in Boston Walter believes the chips lead to mind control and tests this on the FBI agent assigned to him while Peter and Olivia are away. However, during these tests Walter soon changes his theory; the dreams are being stolen from their hosts to cause a "high" in Dr. Nayak, who is receiving them and has two personalities. Peter and Olivia shut down the dream equipment before Nayak kills another victim, but the doctor dies in the process. The final scene shows Peter dreaming about his childhood when Walter kidnaps him, an event Peter normally has no memory of; Peter wakes up confused but still unaware of what his father did.

In a sideplot, Olivia is grieving for her partner Charlie, whom she discovered in previous episode was murdered by a shapeshifter. Sam Weiss (Kevin Corrigan) helps her work through it by giving her a "project" that requires her to collect business cards from people wearing the color red. She is told to grab the first and last letters from the names, that once unscrambled read "you're gonna be fine". There is also a mention in this episode when Olivia tells Peter how Charlie helped her when she was a rookie to regain her confidence with handling her gun. Charlie told her, "you're gonna be fine".

== Production ==
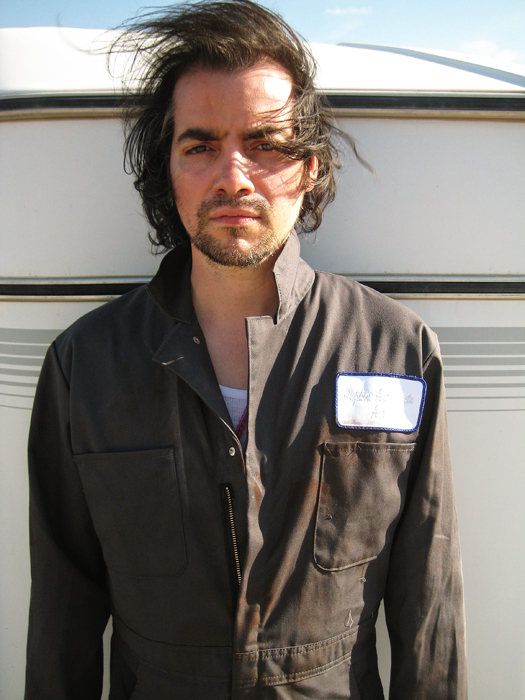
Guest actor Kevin Corrigan made his third Fringe appearance in the episode.

"Dream Logic" was written by co-executive producer Josh Singer and was directed by cinematographer Paul A. Edwards. It was filmed in August 2009. Shooting partly took place in the basement of a semi-functioning mental hospital in Vancouver, leading actress Anna Torv to remark during filming, "I heard this is where they kept dead bodies. Bad vibes in this place." Actor Joshua Jackson noted that the hospital's "patients are known to wander through a shot. This has the potential for being a very interesting day."

"Dream Logic" featured a guest appearance by recurring guest star Kevin Corrigan, as well as one time guest actors Ravi Kapoor, Jim Thorburn, Travis Schuldt, Drew Nelson, and Alex Zahara.

== Music and cultural references ==
"Dream Logic" featured the song "From the Beginning" by the progressive rock trio Emerson, Lake & Palmer. Dr. Nayak's lab assistant is named Zack Miller, which was perceived by some media outlets to be a reference to frequent Fringe writing partners Zack Stentz and Ashley Edward Miller. In the final scene set in the young Peter's bedroom in the parallel universe, a poster depicts the Space Shuttle Challenger in its 11th mission (1984). However, in the prime universe the Challenger exploded in its 10th mission two years later. One viewer noted this as yet another sign that the parallel universe is more technologically advanced than ours, as they began their space program earlier than ours.

== Reception ==
=== Ratings ===
On its initial American broadcast on October 15, 2009, an estimated 5.78 million viewers watched "Dream Logic", helping it earn a 3.5/6 ratings share among all households and a 2.2/6 ratings share in the important 18–49 demographic.

=== Reviews ===
AOL TV writer Jane Boursaw wrote, "The whole storyline with the creepy dual-personality doc and the mind-control-dreams was good, though I sort of knew the doc must be involved from the beginning. I also wonder how it fits in with the alternate universe." The A.V. Club's Zack Handlen graded the episode with a B−. Ken Tucker from Entertainment Weekly believed that "in some ways, this was one of the less-distinctive, more X-Files-ish episodes of Fringe on Thursday night... But as usual, there was another narrative layer at work here" involving a grieving Olivia. IGN's Ramsey Isler rated the episode 7.4/10, explaining the case-of-the-week failed to have "excitement, surprise, and suspense" and lacked "what makes a typical Fringe episode unique and intriguing". While calling certain parts "kind of boring", Isler did however praise the episode's directing, acting, sets, and other technical aspects. He concluded his review by noting the best part of "Dream Logic" was the ending depicting a young Peter, "It's a haunting scene, and it adds yet another stone in this long pathway to revelation that the Fringe team is building up to... But besides that great little scene at the end, I thought this was an average episode. Granted, Fringe's 'average' episodes are still better than a lot of the other stuff on TV."

"This latest episode was all about dreams, which was pretty ironic considering it nearly put me to sleep. Not that this was a particularly bad episode, just a bland one. I'm most intrigued by Fringe when the overarching plot is at play, like last week's tremendously awesome episode. This week, I guess I was fine with it — thanks largely due to the cool effects seen in the accidental killers' waking-dreams — but I'm not satisfied with 'fine,' certainly not when it comes to Fringe."

— MTV columnist Josh Wigler

MTV writer Josh Wigler thought the episode "nearly put [him] to sleep," as it was "bland" and "a bit of a dud". The episode however did lead Wigler to "start dig[ging]" Sam Weiss, and also to enjoying Olivia's subplot, but believed the episode's monster-of-the-week could have been used to actually parallel her trauma; Wigler appreciated how the Fringe case tied into Walter and Peter's backstories. He concluded, "It wasn't bad enough to make me concerned for the future of Fringe or anything, but it certainly didn't keep me on the edge of my seat waiting for the next crazy twist like last week. I'm still loving this season, but tonight's episode was one of the weaker outings." Newsarama's Chanel Reeder stated "Dream Logic" "certainly put the brakes on the speed that Fringe had gained in the previous" episode, but praised the connection with Peter's past as "one of the most interesting underlying parts". Reeder's favorite part was Sam Weiss, calling him "a fantastic dimension to the show". Josie Kafka of Open Salon was more positive than other reviewers, and in particular highlighted the episode's humor, "Almost all of the Cambridge scenes were funny: Astrid and Walter have a great rapport, especially when there's a rube in the room for them to play with." She concluded "I liked this one, more for the great Peter/Olivia and Walter/Astrid stuff than the plot of the week," and gave the episode "Three out of four anagrams".

After the episode's broadcast, Popular Mechanics published an article analyzing the science depicted. They concluded that the brain–computer interface (BCI) chips, like the ones used in the episode to tie the victims' brains to the computer used by Dr. Laxmeesh Nayak, have also been used on real-life human subjects, though not in relation to controlling sleep cycles. However, the article continued that it is "not currently possible" for BCI chips to "facilitate direct transfer of understandable information from one person's brain to another", nor is it possible for the chips to "directly read another person's thoughts or dreams" and steal them. In addition, Popular Mechanics noted that Walter's theory of the victims' deaths being caused by exhaustion is "pure bunk", as there are many long-term experiments that have safely tested humans' deprivation of REM sleep. According to one scientist interviewed, though chips shown in "Dream Logic" cause hallucinations, paranoid thoughts, and a disconnect from reality, these traits are "not even remotely possible" outside of fiction.

=== Awards and nominations ===
Director Paul A. Edwards submitted "Dream Logic" for consideration in the Outstanding Directing for a Drama Series category at the 62nd Primetime Emmy Awards. He did not receive a nomination.
