= Earthling (Fringe) =

- Fringe episode
- In the episode's opening scene, a man disintegrates into ash upon being touched
- Episode no.: Season 2 Episode 6
- Directed by: Jon Cassar
- Written by: J. H. Wyman; Jeff Vlaming
- Production code: 3X5106
- Original air date: November 5, 2009

Guest appearances
- Ravil Isyanov as Timur Vasiliev; Gerard Plunkett as Senator James Van Horn; Michelle Harrison as Natalie Dancik; Joe Towne as Randy Dancik; Karen Holness as Diane Broyles; J. R. Bourne as Agent Edwards; Michael Cerveris as the Observer; Yaroslav Poverlo as Aleks Vasiliev

Episode chronology
← Previous "Dream Logic"	Next → "Of Human Action"
- Fringe season 2

"Earthling" is the sixth episode of the American science fiction drama television series Fringe's second season. The episode followed the Fringe team's investigation into random people mysteriously disintegrating into ash, a case which Agent Broyles had become deeply obsessed with in the past.

It was co-written by J.H. Wyman and Jeff Vlaming, while Jon Cassar served as the director. The episode first aired on November 5, 2009 in the United States on the Fox network. An estimated 4.86 million viewers tuned in, contributing to a new ratings low for the series. The episode received generally mixed reviews, though multiple reviewers highlighted the episode's special effects. The VFX production team received a nomination at the 8th Annual Visual Effects Society Awards.

== Plot ==
A Boston man (Joe Towne) is attacked by a shadowy, ghost-like figure; his wife (Michelle Harrison) returns home to find he disintegrates into ash upon being touched. After learning all of the victims had recently visited a hospital before dying, Agent Broyles (Lance Reddick) explains the case is similar to one he had trouble with in the past, in which his obsessive behavior effectively ended his marriage to his wife Diane. The suspect, an Eastern European man, had contacted him four years ago sounding distraught and asked him to figure out a special formula, which Broyles was unable to solve. Walter (John Noble) and Peter (Joshua Jackson) study the victim's remains at their lab and begin studying the formula given to Broyles.

Several more people are attacked and reduced to ash. A search of Eastern European employees leads them to Russian night nurse Tomas (Ravil Isyanov), but he is gone when they search his apartment. Despite being ordered to end the investigation and that the suspect is wanted by the Russian government and the CIA, Broyles tells Olivia (Anna Torv) to continue the case. Walter posits the entity needs radiation, and chooses its victims based on their exposure levels. They learn that Tomas stole his comatose brother, a former cosmonaut, and has been moving him around to both protect him and contain the entity. Fearing capture, Tomas removes his brother from the hospital; Walter speculates that the cosmonaut brought the entity back with him upon returning from space. Walter is finally able to solve the formula, and Broyles sadly tells Tomas over the phone that his brother and the entity cannot be separated. However, during their conversation, the entity escapes his brother's body and kills Tomas. The Fringe team is able to trace the call, and Broyles shoots the host (Tomas' brother) in the head to stop the entity from attacking another victim.

At the end of the episode, a mysterious CIA agent (J. R. Bourne) approaches Broyles and tells him to not report the case. He reveals the cosmonaut resurrected itself, and it is implied to have been sent into space, "wherever it came from".

== Production ==
=== Writing and filming ===
"The bad guy has collected a whole bunch of car batteries in his hotel room and they buzz and zap and really get going when he throws the switch to zap the host and hold the smoke monster inside him. It ended up sounding a little like a 1920's [sic] electric chair but had lots of screams and growls as the smoke monster got to vocalize a little bit as he was zapped into submission. This episode had lots of little electrical things scattered around and I tried to make it sound a little like the Exploratorium in San Francisco, California, with all of its electricity-based exhibits."

— Sound editor Bruce Tanis on producing the episode's auditory effects

The episode was co-written by executive producer J.H. Wyman and supervising producer Jeff Vlaming, while 24 veteran, Jon Cassar, directed the hour. On August 14, 2009, he posted "rough drawn" storyboards of the episode on Twitter. The episode is Cassar's only directional credit for the series.

The episode was filmed in mid-September 2009 in Vancouver. Due to the Russian lettering on many of the episode props, director Cassar joked during shooting, "Can we get a translator and find out what this writing means, specifically? Maybe it says 'Do not open until Christmas' or 'Watch The Simpsons on Sunday night,' knowing Fox." To create the episode's auditory effects, sound editor Bruce Tanis explained his production steps in an interview with Designing Sound, "'Earthling' was a really good episode for strange sounds. It starts out with the appearance of a smoke monster that kills its victims by enveloping them and leaving behind an exact life-like looking corpse only the body is made of ash which crumbles horribly when touched. The smoke creature moved rapidly as opposed to gently drifting so I had some movement to play off of in creating a sound for him. I came up with some stuttering, fluttery whooshes that kind of vibrated which made him more dangerous than if he sounded like a puff of steam moving along the hall. The smoke monster requires a host body to live in when he's not vibrating around killing people. The only way to recall the smoke monster to the host body, or to keep him there in the first place, is by severe electrical shock."

Visual effects supervisor Jay Worth found inspiration for the ash storyline from holding his grandmother-in-law's hands while at her funeral. He noted during production, "The Ash Man definitely had its own set of challenges, because we wanted to utilize a lot of real elements, and because we didn't have the time to do all the simulation and particle work needed to make it look real. The thing that sold The Ash Man more than anything was the aftermath shot: This half-disintegrated body with a pile of ash for the head on the ground. It ended up being a layering, compositing, tweaking challenge beyond belief. I got to shoot the elements myself and had more control over them."

"You get to see [Broyles] smile and have fun. Not for very long, but you see it. You get to meet his ex-wife and find out why his marriage ended. You understand more about his relationship to his work and his job and the Fringe Division–how he feels about it and why he does what he does."

— Actor Lance Reddick on his character's development in the episode

Another VFX supervisor from Zoic Studios, Andrew Orloff, believed the episode's special effects were possibly the most difficult of the season. He wrote, "Originally, it was supposed to be a practical effect but they couldn't get it to fall in a natural way, so what we had to do was shoot the practical elements in pieces and we put them all together and timed all those plates and ended up rebuilding a significant part of it and tying it all together in CG. So we took a cyberscan of the guy's body, and on top of all the practical elements we used as a base, we had a matte painting, a reveal matte painting of the cracks that ran through the body, 3D particles of large chunks of ash falling out, 3D particles of small ash bits floating down, residual dust flying off of it and, at one point, his head falls off and crashes to the ground as ash. So we had to do a full-CG head and tumble it down the body. That was pretty complicated and entailed lots of R&D: there was 2D work in After Effects, tracking, retiming, we did a lot of CG lighting for the body parts in Maya/mental ray and all of the particles were a combination of Maya software, and rendered in Maya/mental ray."

=== Casting and audio ===
Guest actor Gerard Plunkett made the first of two appearances as Senator James Van Horn (the second would be a season three episode). Other guest stars included Ravil Isyanov, J. R. Bourne, Joe Towne, Michelle Harrison, and Yaroslav Poverlo. Karen Holness made her first guest appearance of the series playing Broyles' ex-wife Diane.

In addition to its original score, "Earthling" featured musical content from several outside artists. These songs included "Freezing" by American singer MoZella, "Straighten Up and Fly Right" by American musician Nat King Cole, and "Una furtiva lagrima" by American tenor Mario Lanza.

== Reception ==
=== Ratings ===
The episode was first broadcast on November 5, 2009 after a two-week hiatus. "Earthling" was watched by an estimated 4.86 million viewers in the United States. It earned a 3.0/5 household rating and a 1.7/4 ratings share for adults aged 18–49. With a 23 percent ratings decline from the previous episode and a 40 percent decline from the first season, this was a new series low for Fringe, which some media outlets attributed to the unexpected early end of the 2009 World Series.

=== Reviews ===
"It's a Broyles episode, hooray! Our favorite stone-faced FBI badass finally gets a story of his own, and we get to see a lot of interesting new aspects of the character. But, unfortunately, the story that serves as the vehicle for these revelations is kind of dull, and it doesn't quite measure up to the kind of captivating standalone episodes we've seen from Fringe before."

— IGN writer Ramsey Isler

MTV columnist Josh Wigler was disappointed with the presumed alien storyline and believed it to be a "weak episode". Despite liking actor Lance Reddick, Wigler was displeased with his character's increased screentime, believing Broyles works better as an "enigmatic figure". Wigler did however praise the villain's "murderous method of choice", writing "Those who've read my Fringe reviews know that I'm not big on the mystery-of-the-week element, but I have to give this episode some credit for at least making it look good." IGN's Ramsey Isler rated the episode 8.0/10, noting the "great work" done with the CGI and props while at the same time acknowledging the opening was not "particularly exciting". Isler praised Reddick's performance, but continued "besides the Broyles characterization, this episode kind of fell flat. The plot unfolds slowly, and the first sixty percent of this episode is kind of a yawner. The only things that really spice up the story are Walter's antics (which are very amusing, as usual). The monster of the week, an alien stowing away in a Russian cosmonaut's body, isn't all that scary or even malevolent (it's just trying to stay alive by feeding on radiation)."

Writing for The A.V. Club, Noel Murray graded "Earthling" with a B. Unlike Isler, Murray loved the opening, calling it "one of Fringe's most effective freak-meets". Murray continued that he believed the episode to be "an efficient action/adventure/horror hour, heavy on suspenseful moments and neat effects, light on character development and progress on the master-plot. When all is said and done and Fringe eventually ends its run, I'm betting that a newcomer will be able to skip 'Earthling' without putting a dent in their overall understanding of the show. But that doesn't mean it wasn't still cool to see people get reduced to dust right in front of our eyes. Jane Boursaw from AOL TV responded negatively to the episode, wishing it had not been yet another "stand-alone creature feature". While praising the special effects, Boursaw expressed disinterest in learning more about Broyles and compared the Fringe case to something already done in The X-Files. She concluded, "Take the creepy alien factor out of it, and this could have been any other police procedural". UGO Networks reviewer Alex Zalben also noted similarities to The X-Files, writing that "the reason [the episode] is weird for Fringe is that, aforementioned evidence aside, they’ve been very careful to avoid the overarching alien mythology X-Files is famous for. Oops."

=== Awards and nominations ===
The crew responsible for the episode's visual effects, VFX supervisors Jay Worth, Robert Habros, and Andrew Orlaff, and Visual Effects Artist Eric Hance, succeeded in gaining a nomination for their work. "Earthling" was nominated in the "Visual effects in a broadcast series" category at the 8th Annual Visual Effects Society Awards, but lost to the fourth season finale of the science fiction series Battlestar Galactica.
