= David Wilcox (screenwriter) =

American television writer and producer

- Occupation(s): Writer, producer
- Years active: 1998 - present

David Wilcox is a television writer and producer.

== Career ==
He is known for working on series such as Law & Order, Dragnet, and the American remake of Life on Mars.

ABC picked up 666 Park Avenue to pilot. Wilcox created the project and served as executive producer and writer.

=== Fringe ===
In Summer 2009, Wilcox joined the FOX series Fringe as a co-executive producer and writer at the beginning of season two. He left the show after the third season finale. Episodes he contributed to are as follows:

- "Fracture"
- "Snakehead"
- "Do Shapeshifters Dream of Electric Sheep?" (co-written with Matthew Pitts)
- "The Abducted" (co-written by executive story editor Graham Roland)
- "Immortality" (co-written by story editor Ethan Gross)
- "6:02 AM EST" (co-written with co-executive producer Josh Singer and Roland)
