= Do Shapeshifters Dream of Electric Sheep? =

- Fringe episode
- Thomas Jerome Newton (Roché) bleeds out mercury after receiving a suicide pill from Fauxlivia (Torv).
- Episode no.: Season 3 Episode 4
- Directed by: Kenneth Fink
- Written by: David Wilcox; Matthew Pitts
- Production code: 3X6104
- Original air date: October 14, 2010

Guest appearances
- Michael Cerveris as The Observer; Marcus Giamatti as Ray Duffy; Gerard Plunkett as James Van Horn; Sebastian Roché as Thomas Jerome Newton; Shannon Cochran as Patricia Van Horn

Episode chronology
← Previous "The Plateau"	Next → "Amber 31422"
- Fringe season 3

"Do Shapeshifters Dream of Electric Sheep?" is the fourth episode of the third season of the American science fiction drama television series Fringe, and the 47th episode overall. The first half of the third season alternated entire episodes between the parallel universe (the "Other Side") and the prime universe ("Our Side"). "Do Shapeshifters Dream of Electric Sheep?" took place in the prime universe, and involved several shapeshifters, including Thomas Jerome Newton (Sebastian Roché), who is eventually captured. Meanwhile, Fauxlivia (Anna Torv) attempts to maintain her cover and minimize the damage.

The episode was written by David Wilcox and Matthew Pitts, while Kenneth Fink served as director for the hour. It first aired on October 14, 2010 in the United States to an estimated 5.22 million viewers. It received mostly positive reviews, as many critics praised the plot's focus on the shapeshifters.

== Plot ==
In the prime universe, U.S. senator James Van Horn (Gerard Plunkett), who has been reviewing the Fringe division's activities, is hospitalized following a car accident. While he's in the hospital, Thomas Jerome Newton (Sebastian Roché) arrives and shoots him in the face, then escapes. The Fringe team discover that Van Horn was a shapeshifter. Walter (John Noble) finds that the body is still alive to some degree through a second "brain" on his back, and hopes to use Van Horn's wife Patricia (Shannon Cochran) to try to awaken it and study the shapeshifter more.

Fauxlivia (Anna Torv), still posing as the prime universe's Olivia (Torv), informs Newton of this development. Newton contacts a second shapeshifter, Ray (Marcus Giamatti), to infiltrate the secured location where Van Horn's body is being held to remove the data disc that Walter will ultimately find. Ray regrets the possibility of having to leave his current identity, a police officer with a wife and son. Meanwhile, Peter (Joshua Jackson) and Fauxlivia discover that Van Horn has acquired a number of records on the personnel of the Fringe team, and likely has used the information to aid the parallel universe's Walternate (Noble).

At the secured facility, Fauxlivia is able to clear Peter, Astrid (Jasika Nicole) and Walter from the lab in order to allow Ray access to the lab. Ray continues to avoid shifting to a new body. Walter returns to the lab to confirm a theory and is interrupted by Ray. Ray successfully removes the data device, knocks out Walter, and flees to give it to Newton. When Ray requests to be able to return to his family, Newton kills him near his home, but by this time, the Fringe division has identified Ray and have converged on his address. On spotting Newton, they engage in a car chase, eventually damaging Newton's car. Fauxlivia recovers Van Horn's data disc from Newton and hides it before taking Newton into custody.

Sometime later, Fauxlivia visits Newton in a high-security prison, and passes him the equivalent of a suicide pill that causes him to self-destruct and bleed out mercury. Fauxlivia realizes Peter has become suspicious of her actions, and sleeps with him to draw away his attention.

== Production ==
"In this episode, our team discovers that Walternate's shapeshifters' reach is further than they had first thought. After she loses an important ally, Fauxlivia is forced to question how far she is willing to go to ensure her mission is a success."

— Executive producers Jeff Pinkner and J.H. Wyman describing the episode in an email

The episode was co-written by co-executive producer David Wilcox and J. J. Abrams' assistant, Matthew Pitts. CSI: Crime Scene Investigation veteran Kenneth Fink served as director, his only Fringe credit to date. In an interview with Entertainment Weekly, executive producer Jeff Pinkner explained the role of the shapeshifters in the two universes, "The shapeshifters are Walternate's 'soldiers.' Part organic, part mechanical — they 'bleed' mercury — and are able to take the shape of any human that they kill. Walternate sent them here years ago (they were able to cross universes safely because they're not human) to act as sleeper agents".

"Do Shapeshifters Dream of Electric Sheep?" featured the second appearance of guest actor Gerard Plunkett as Senator Van Horn, as well as the first appearance of Marcus Giamatti as a shapeshifter. It was the last episode with guest star Sebastian Roché (who played the villain Thomas Jerome Newton). Despite his character's death, executive producer J. H. Wyman hinted in a later Twitter post that Roché may return.

As with other Fringe episodes, Fox released a science lesson plan in collaboration with Science Olympiad for grade school children, focusing on the science seen in "Do Shapeshifters Dream of Electric Sheep?", with the intention of having "students learn about memory, which is the ability to store, retain, and recall information and experiences."

== Cultural references ==
The episode title "Do Shapeshifters Dream of Electric Sheep" refers to the Philip K. Dick science fiction novel Do Androids Dream of Electric Sheep?, which was later adapted into the film Blade Runner. The novel dealt with what it means to be human, exploring how faking an emotion long enough can actually develop into real feelings, much like in the episode where two shapeshifters first pretended but then developed feelings for their victims' families. While Peter is drinking in a bar, science fiction movie The Invisible Boy is playing on a television in the background, with the character Robby the Robot visible. During the episode, Walter makes two requests in order to provide "brain stimulation" to the deceased Senator Van Horn: a portrait of former president George W. Bush, and a copy of Hump Magazine.

== Reception ==
=== Ratings ===
"Do Shapeshifters Dream of Electric Sheep?" was watched by 5.22 million viewers in the United States, with 3.2/5 share among all households and a 2/5 share for viewers aged 18–49. SFScope reviewer Sarah Stegall commented that because of the show's low ratings "it is almost at the point where it would be a top-rated show on cable; but these are not good numbers for broadcast TV." Time shifted viewing increased the episode's ratings by 45 percent among adults, resulting in a rise from 2.0 to 2.9.

=== Reviews ===
The episode received mostly positive reviews. Andrew Hanson from the Los Angeles Times thought the episode continued the series' season three "hot streak", but wished the promo had not spoiled Senator Van Horn being a shapeshifter. Hanson also did not fully buy into the Peter-Fauxlivia relationship, as he expected Peter to realize something different about her. Noel Murray from The A.V. Club loved the shapeshifter focus of the episode and graded it an A−, explaining it was a "very strong episode" that "brings back one of my favorite Fringe concepts: those crazy super-powered shapeshifters". MTV's Josh Wigler also enjoyed the shapeshifter plot, and wrote that "the latest episode of Fringe marks four fantastic installments in a row, instantly establishing season three as having the strongest opening act of any other previous year in the science fiction series. Fringe has reinvented itself by drastically altering just one ingredient in the show's successful format — namely, the true identity of Olivia Dunham — to create something wholly new and amazing". Television Without Pity gave the episode an A−.

Entertainment Weekly's Ken Tucker enjoyed the episode, writing that "this week's Fringe contained everything I love about the show, from LSD to the great villain Thomas Jerome Newton. [The episode] didn't use its Philip K. Dick-shifted title as a coy joke — it really was about the dreams of shapeshifters, dreams and hopes which took a variety of forms". Open Salon praised Torv's performance this season, and thought it was a "very thought-provoking episode, with some major implications for Peter and Olivia's relationship moving forward". Alex Zalben of UGO Networks, however, called the episode the "first clunker of the season" because despite approving of the plot and the acting, the "writing was uniformly obvious, stilted and kind of terrible... there were more head-slappingly stupid moments than I could count". SFScope's Sarah Stegall noted similarities to the film Blade Runner, and predicted that the consummation of their relationship would cause Peter to discover Fauxlivia's true identity.
