= August (Fringe episode) =

- Fringe episode
- An Observer breaks his race's set of rules and personally involves himself to save a girl's life.
- Episode no.: Season 2 Episode 8
- Directed by: Dennis Smith
- Written by: J. H. Wyman; Jeff Pinkner
- Production code: 3X5108
- Original air date: November 19, 2009

Guest appearances
- Peter Woodward as August; Michael Cerveris as September; Eugene Lipinski as December; Ryan McDonald as Brandon; Paul Rae as Donald Long; Jennifer Missoni as Christine Hollis; Amos Stern as July; Ali Liebert as Danielle

Episode chronology
← Previous "Of Human Action"	Next → "Snakehead"
- Fringe season 2

"August" is the eighth episode of the American science fiction drama television series Fringe's second season. The episode was co-written by J. H. Wyman and Jeff Pinkner, and directed by Dennis Smith. The episode marked the first prominent appearance of more than one Observer, and follows the events that occur when one of them saves a girl from boarding a soon-to-be crashing plane. It featured two new guest stars, Peter Woodward and Eugene Lipinski.

The episode first aired on November 19, 2009 in the United States to mostly positive reviews, with many critics praising the new revelations about the Observers. An estimated 5.746 million viewers watched the episode on its first broadcast.

== Plot ==
An Observer, "August" (Peter Woodward) abducts Christine Hollis (Jennifer Missoni), a 27-year-old art student in Boston. Olivia Dunham (Anna Torv) and Peter Bishop (Joshua Jackson) learn of the events and realize the assailant matches the description of the Observer. However, after viewing video footage they find that it is not "September" (Michael Cerveris), the Observer known for observing Pattern-related cases and who previously saved Peter and his father Walter (John Noble) in 1985, indicating there is more than one Observer. Olivia is confused as to August's motives, as Observers are known to only observe events and not interfere with them. After questioning Christine's roommate, Olivia learns she was to take a flight to Rome, Italy. Peter finds a picture of Christine from her childhood before her parents were killed in the 1989 San Francisco earthquake, and sees August in the background, indicating he has been observing her entire life. The plane to Rome would later crash, killing everyone on board. Because of this, the team realize August in fact saved her life.

At Massive Dynamic, Brandon (Ryan McDonald) theorizes to the team that Observers are time travelers, as they have been documented during several major events in history. They write in an incomprehensible language, and the number of Observer sightings has increased over the past few months, leaving the team wondering why. Meanwhile, August visits the other Observers, who are not happy that he saved a girl who was supposed to die in the plane crash. To correct his mistake, they send Donald Long (Paul Rae), an assassin affiliated with the Observers to correct August's actions. In an attempt to save Christine, August sends a secret message to Walter. During the meeting, August reveals Christine will die because she is not important; Walter tells August that he has to make her important.

The team are later made aware of Christine's location at a motel outside the city. However, Donald is on the trail also. August attempts to stop him, but Donald shoots him several times, before Peter and Olivia arrive to kill the assassin. September picks up August and while driving, September asks August why he saved Christine. August reveals that he is experiencing 'feelings' and that he loves Christine, and asks if she would be safe. September informs him Christine will stay alive because she is now important; she was responsible for the death of an Observer. August cries before succumbing to his wounds. In the end, Olivia takes a day off to spend time with her niece, Ella, at an amusement park. Two Observers watch the two, and they remark that everything is about to get "so hard" for Olivia.

== Production ==
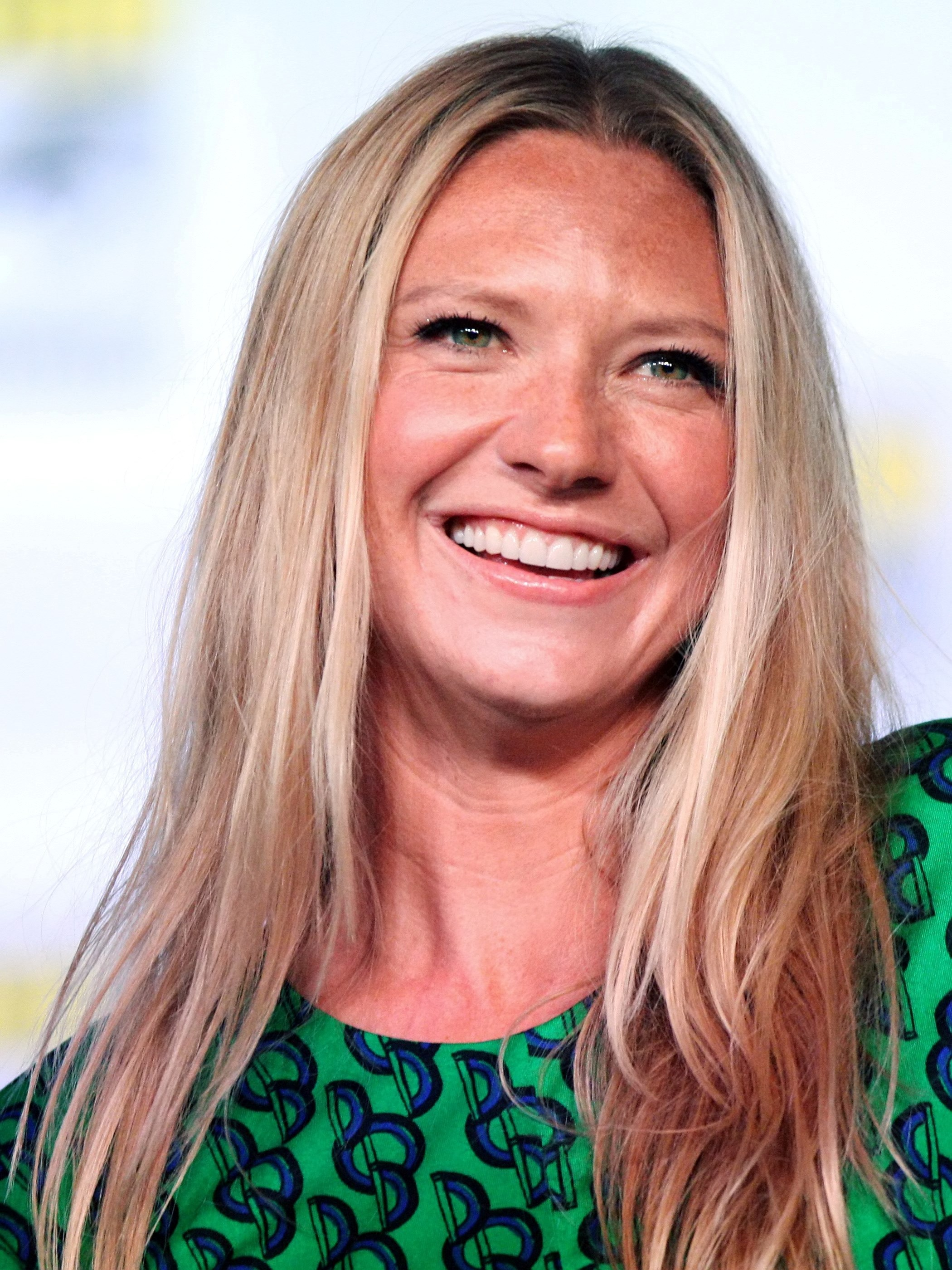
Lead actress Anna Torv calls "August" one of her favorite episodes.

"August" was co-written by co-showrunners J. H. Wyman and Jeff Pinkner, while being directed by NCIS veteran Dennis Smith. They began shooting the episode during the second half of September 2009, right after wrapping production on "Of Human Action". Supervising producer Josh Singer later noted how "August" helped them write the rest of the season, "There was one episode, 'August', which was all about the Observers, that I feel was mythology without being mythology. And somehow, in working that episode, we sort of found a new creative vein. And it's not that that episode was necessarily so related to everything else we did. But I feel like it sort of opened us up in terms of how we were feeling about the year".

Pinkner: "It's a story where this character who in many ways is unknowable and 'other' is driven by emotion. At the end of the episode hopefully you feel something. Wyman: It qualifies him to a certain degree for everybody. It will definitely open up a whole other line of concept and line of understanding ... The entire episode reveals itself to be about a very human emotion and the way we chose to tell this episode is through the eyes of someone who is not human."

— Executive Producers Jeff Pinkner and J. H. Wyman

Up to the point the episode "August" aired, only one character that was part of a group known as "Observers" had been introduced. In this episode, two more such individuals were revealed: August (played by Peter Woodward) and December (played by Eugene Lipinski). The creation of Observers was one of the first ideas the writers of Fringe thought of when developing the show in its early stages, when they asked each other, "What if there were these characters where all they did was watch?". Pinkner and Wyman thought of creating Observers by "looking for something... iconic" that had the "quality of being invisible". Though the Observer called September has appeared in every single Fringe episode in a brief cameo, he was first featured prominently in the fourth episode of the first season. The producers thought of unique characteristics for "somebody who wasn't of our world," evolving to the Observers having bald heads, no eyebrows, and "largely deadened" senses, which led to a love for extremely hot peppers.

Before the second season premiere aired in September 2009, co-creator J.R. Orci hinted that the audience was going to meet "many Observers", and that in the season's eighth episode, "You're going to find out their role in the world, what they're named after, and their connection to some of these characters." Later on, when still leading up to the airing of "August" in another interview, Roberto Orci elaborated that "Individuality will be one of the things that they will be fanatically struggling with, actually. That was a fun one, because that one was one where you're finally getting to pay off things you've been setting up for a year. You finally get to open the toy box and really play with those toys". Actor Michael Cerveris, who plays September, commented in an interview that as a result of the episode, viewers would learn that the Observers "are not completely devoid of feelings, and are not incapable of being attached to people they're observing". He also expressed relief that his character was no longer the sole Observer on the show, joking that "it was nice to feel like I'm not the only freak in town for once".

Actress Anna Torv stated in an interview with MTV News that "August" was one of her favorite episodes because "We sort of get to meet the Observers. At the moment what we know about them, they... seemingly just observe. That's kind of it, but [in] the episode that we have coming up, we're not sure if all they do is just observe".

== Reception ==
=== Ratings ===
"August" premiered to an estimated 5.746 million viewers in the United States, with a 2.0 rating. The episode was down 9% from the previous week's episode "Of Human Action", which had a rating of 2.2.

=== Reviews ===
MTV's Josh Wigler thought the episode was "a touching, sad tale with a healthy mix of mythological advancement," and couldn't wait for more episodes about the Observers. Ramsey Isler of IGN gave the episode 7.6/10, writing that despite the hype, the episode was "just plain average". He did however appreciate the new revelations about the Observers. After previewing the episode, Entertainment Weekly's Ken Tucker graded the episode an A−, explaining Fringe had become "one of the fastest, smartest, wittiest shows on television now". Andrew Hanson from the Los Angeles Times called it a "good story peppered with a lot of great details... 'August' showed a greater connection to the larger Fringe universe". Noel Murray of The A.V. Club graded it with a B+, praising the "wonderfully moody" episode and how it was able to make the halting Observer dialogue work. Murray found some aspects lacking however, as he thought it was "a very sketchy episode, plot-wise and mythology-wise. Not a whole lot happened". Website blogger io9 listed "August" as one of the "crucial" episodes new viewers must watch to get into the show.
