= Momentum Deferred =

- Fringe episode
- The formerly detached head of Thomas Jerome Newton (Sebastian Roché) is reattached to a body.
- Episode no.: Season 2 Episode 4
- Directed by: Joe Chappelle
- Written by: Zack Stentz; Ashley Edward Miller
- Production code: 3X5104
- Original air date: October 8, 2009

Guest appearances
- Sebastian Roché as Thomas Jerome Newton; Theresa Russell as Rebecca Kibner; Ryan McDonald as Brandon; Aaron Craven as Kurt Larsen; Anna Van Hooft as Nina's Assistant; Leonard Nimoy as William Bell; Roger R. Cross as Smith; Michael Cerveris as the Observer

Episode chronology
← Previous "Fracture"	Next → "Dream Logic"
- Fringe season 2

"Momentum Deferred" is the fourth episode of the second season of the American science fiction drama television series Fringe. Screenwriters Zack Stentz and Ashley Edward Miller wrote the episode, and co-executive producer Joe Chappelle directed it.

The episode followed the theft of cryogenically-frozen heads by shapeshifters from the parallel universe in their search for a specific head, while the Fringe team attempts to prevent this. Meanwhile, Olivia struggles to remember her conversation with William Bell (guest actor Leonard Nimoy) that took place in the season one finale. "Momentum Deferred" marked the first appearances of guest actors Theresa Russell, Sebastian Roché, and Ryan McDonald.

It first aired on October 8, 2009 in the United States, and was watched by more than 6.02 million viewers. The episode received generally positive reviews, with many critics praising the new revelations about the shapeshifters, the parallel universe, as well as the much-anticipated conversation between Olivia and William Bell. In January 2013, IGN ranked it as the third best episode of the series.

== Plot ==
A shipment of heads stored in cryogenic storage is hijacked, though one of the hijackers is killed by a guard, and bleeds a mix of blood and mercury, identifying him as a shapeshifter from the parallel universe. The Fringe division discovers an undamaged device they believe is used by the shapeshifters to take another's identity. Olivia Dunham (Anna Torv) gives the device to Nina Sharp (Blair Brown) at Massive Dynamic; with the intact device, they can use it to examine the device of the first shapeshifter that tried to kill Olivia in the episode "A New Day in the Old Town". They are unaware that this shapeshifter has taken the form of Olivia's partner, Charlie (Kirk Acevedo), ordered to find out what she learned from William Bell (Leonard Nimoy) when she was temporarily taken to the parallel universe.

Walter (John Noble) remembers that one of his former patients Rebecca Kibner (Theresa Russell), while under a heavy dose of mind-altering drugs, had witnessed events in the parallel universe including the presence of the shapeshifters. To try to learn more, they approach Rebecca and ask for her help, who is happy to participate. After outfitting her with electrodes and injecting her with more drugs, Walter starts the process by clanging a bell; to everyone's surprise, this causes Olivia to pass out.

The bell has caused Olivia to recall her conversation with Bell in the parallel universe. There, Bell warned Olivia of a "great storm" that was coming, and that she must stop a man who is trying to open a gateway between the two universes, providing Olivia with an icon symbol and a hand-written name to remember. Walter and Peter help revive Olivia who immediately demands to see Nina. As Olivia leaves, Walter returns with Rebecca to her home.

Nina, initially doubtful that Olivia met Bell, recognizes the "great storm" phrase, and attempts to help Olivia in any way possible. As Olivia recounts the name of another cryonics facility from Bell's note, she receives a text message from Charlie warning her that Nina is the shapeshifter. She leaves and regroups with Charlie, but in a side alley, is alerted by her phone that Massive Dynamic's analysis of the first device was completed, and reveals Charlie as the shapeshifter. Too late, Olivia realizes she has told Charlie the location of the cryonics facility, and Charlie relays this to another agent. After a brief fight for her life, Olivia shoots and kills the shapeshifter. Broyles (Lance Reddick) helps to comfort Olivia that she had to kill the man she thought was Charlie. At the episode's conclusion, the head with Bell's symbol is reattached to the body of a shapeshifter.

== Production ==
=== Writing and filming ===
"Momentum Deferred" was written by screenwriters Zack Stentz and Ashley Edward Miller. In the first several drafts of the episode, it was initially called "This is the Night Mail," which was based on a poem by W.H. Auden. The episode completed the "gun arc" storyline, which began with Olivia hurtling out of her SUV in the season premiere and being too weak to control her gun during her physical recovery, and ended with the killing of the shapeshifter posing as Charlie Francis. Miller and Stentz elaborated, "I think it's Jeff Pinkner who described the first several episodes as the gun arc. Because really the gun played out until Olivia was whole again. Her actions with the gun in all of those episodes symbolized where she was on the journey. And it culminates in her being able to use it to kill someone who looks exactly like her best friend."

"[Olivia will have a] further understanding of what Bell and Walter Bishop hoped to accomplish when they experimented on her as a child."

— Executive producer Jeff Pinkner explaining the episode

Co-executive producer Joe Chappelle worked as the episode director. He commented, "I was so looking forward to directing 2x04 because it was a payoff of a full season and three episodes of work. You've been laying all this groundwork of information for all the characters and the backstory. The actors loved doing it because they're earned moments."

The episode was shot in Vancouver during the summer, where temperatures were over 100 degrees Fahrenheit. Executive producer Jeff Pinkner commented that despite the heat, guest actor Leonard Nimoy "was doing pages and pages of dialogue, and he handled it like a pro," while co-star Joshua Jackson joked that "[Nimoy's] wife said he practices biofeedback, so he knows how to control his body temperature". Chappelle called the episode "intriguing because it's a summation of everything that came before it, so we're resolving a lot of issues and a lot of questions. But it's also a springboard into the rest of the season". Actor John Noble, who played Walter Bishop, called it "probably one of our strongest and densest episodes" because it "changes the whole direction of the show".

Not knowing when his next billed episode would be, Nimoy said in an interview before "Momentum Deferred" aired that he's "waiting to see what these terribly imaginative writers come up with for the future. I'm expecting that I probably will be going back to work for them before too much longer. I'm looking forward to what they send me on the page". After shooting the episode, Pinkner said "We want him back as much as he wants to come back". Nimoy's next appearance occurred six episodes later, in "Grey Matters". As a reference to a brief appearance by Nimoy's character William Bell, sound editor Bruce Tanis was instructed to create bells as a recurring motif in the scene when Bell encounters Olivia and gives her vital information about the parallel universe. Tanis explained that because he couldn't put the sound of bells in everything, he "took some dry ice recordings and pitched them down considerably and reverbed them to become ringing tones that I played underneath the whole scene". Tanis also used some "reversed" ship's bells as well as crystal glass rubs in order to make Bell's office sound like multiple layers of glass and bell sounds; he referred to the scene as "a little ominous" but not "too cliche".

Prop master Rob Smith joined the series during its second season, and had to quickly learn about all the gadgets featured in Fringe's debut season. Smith was asked to create a "neural stimulator" in the script to "Momentum Deferred", but "didn't really know the episodes well enough to say, 'Oh, ok, that's exactly what it is.' So I talked to the director, who had been on season 1, and he goes, 'Oh, I don't know, it's just something that goes on the guy's head'." Smith discovered that the headpiece in question had been rented during the first season, causing him to recreate the prop over one weekend. He called this process "a little bit stressful." The gadget, Smith explained, was important because it "defined the way that Walter works. He's this mad scientist who takes conventional science and then puts his own twist on it, as it were. And then the thing that struck me about that one was that it made me uncomfortable to look at it." Smith added, "It's one of those things that people love and hate about Fringe, it puts your [sic] out of your comfort zone. That's sort of what I was trying to say about Walter… there's kind of a bird's nest of wires everywhere, and then they end up on the guy's head, and from that he can tell what the guy's thinking. It's quite cool."

=== Casting ===
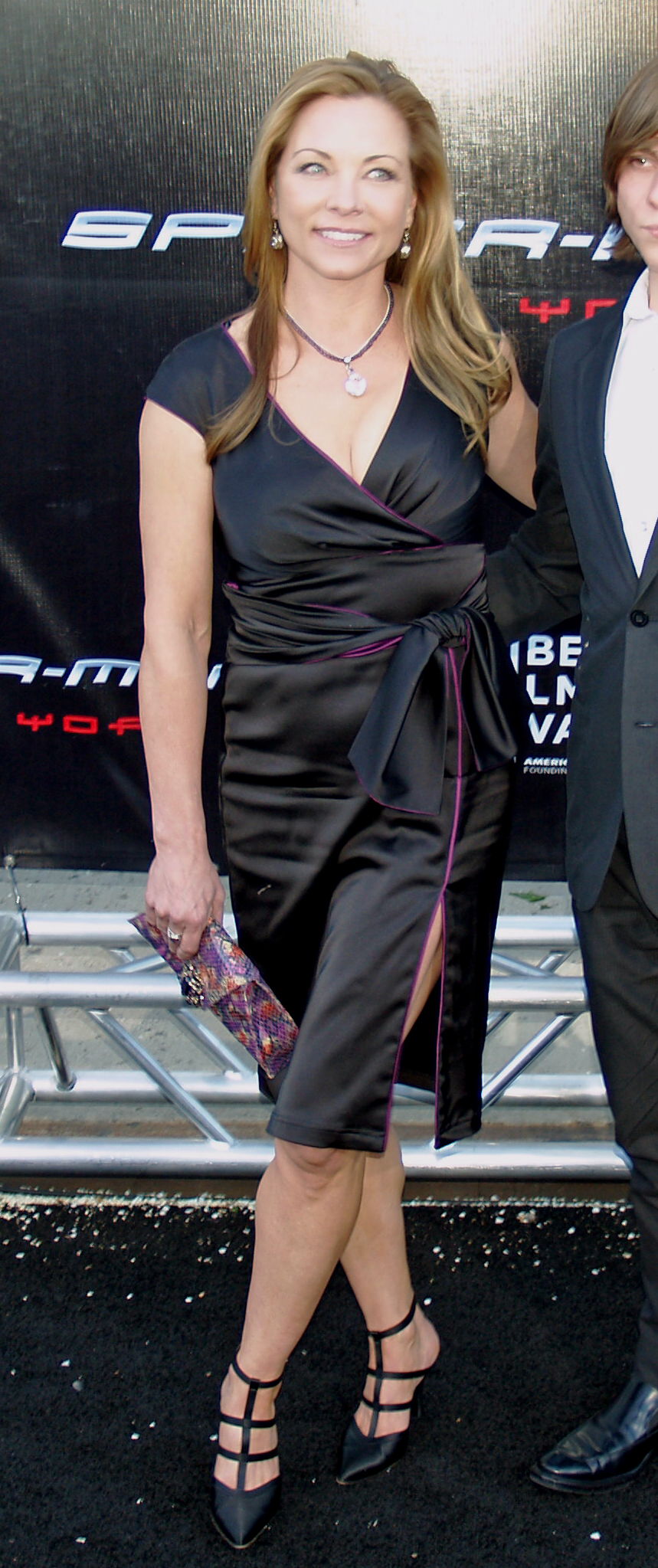
The episode marked the only appearance by guest actress Theresa Russell.

"Momentum Deferred" marked the first appearance of guest actor Sebastian Roché as Thomas Jerome Newton, a new recurring villain from the parallel universe often referred to as the "Omega Man". Newton was named in honor of English musician David Bowie, who played a character with the same name in the film The Man Who Fell to Earth. German actor Thomas Kretschmann was originally cast for the part, but was unable to be a recurring character due to a scheduling conflict. Though uncredited, Kretschmann briefly did some shooting on the set of "Momentum Deferred"; Kretschmann was originally in Newton's one scene in the episode, at the end when they show a sewn-up head, but Roché's head instead appears.

Near the end of the first season in late May 2009, actor Kirk Acevedo announced he was "fired" off of the show from his Facebook page. Executive producer Jeff Pinkner denied it soon after, explaining that "like all things on Fringe, there is more to this story than meets the eye" and reminded viewers that an alternate version of his character had already appeared in a first season episode. Later that summer at Comic-Con in July he reiterated that "rumors of Charlie's demise are premature," and at the August Television Critics Association press tour he commented about Charlie possibly showing up in the previously visited parallel universe. "Momentum Deferred" marked the actor's last appearance in the prime universe. In response to why the character was killed off, Entertainment Weekly's Michael Ausiello reported that the "storyline dictated. Charlie wasn't going to have much to do this season, and rather than waste Kirk's time, they cut him loose". The character's doppelganger from the parallel universe returned in the season finale "Over There".

Despite initial reports stating guest actress Theresa Russell would be playing a recurring character, the episode marked her only appearance as an adult version of the character. Russell plays Rebecca Kibner, a former test subject and love interest of Walter's; a younger version played by actress Tegan Moss is seen in the season premiere "A New Day in the Old Town". In the DVD audio commentary, the writers explained that when they were looking for an actress to play the character, the casting director April Webster, acting on Jeff Pinkner's instructions, called Kibner both "a blessing and a curse," because the writers wanted to explore the burden of what it meant to be special. One writer explained Kibner and Walter's past relationship had not been a long-term affair, but instead more of a "little fling". The episode also marked the first appearance of Canadian actor Ryan McDonald as recurring character Brandon Fayette, a Massive Dynamic scientist. According to the episode's writers, the character is based on a man who works at the production company Bad Robot.

== Reception ==
=== Ratings ===
"Momentum Deferred" aired to an estimated 6.02 million viewers in the United States, with a 2.1/6 rating for adults 18–49. This rating helped Fox increase 39% in the rating share from the previous year on their Thursday night shows.

=== Reviews ===
Josh Wigler from MTV loved the revelations from the conversation with William Bell, along with the appearance of shapeshifters. He thought the episode was Fringe "at its absolute finest," as the "mystery-of-the-week and the overarching plot worked in complete harmony with one another, proving that Fringe is entirely capable of delivering on both a serialized and episodic basis". Entertainment Weekly's Ken Tucker praised guest actor Leonard Nimoy's "terrific, coolly-controlled performance," and wrote that he continued "to admire the way Fringe can mind-meld its scientific fiction with workplace-family drama and light comedy, juggling an increasing number of characters and subplots, while still maintaining a strong narrative through-line". The A.V. Club's Noel Murray graded the episode a B+, explaining that the episode was much better than the previous week and also praising the introduction of two new characters and the long awaited meeting between Olivia and William Bell. Murray concluded his review somewhat negatively, "If the whole episode had maintained the "yes we're aware this is kinda nutsy" tone of that one great line, I'd have bumped it up one more notch to the A-level. I'm holding back only because "Momentum Deferred" was such an info-dump, and played a fraction too soberly".

Writing for Mania.com, Stephen Lackey thought the alternate universe plotline was risky because it had the potential to cause Fringe to "mak[e] a complex plot convoluted by taking off in flights of fancy with the writing and forgetting what has been written before," but he does not believe that point has been reached yet. He also thought the meeting between Olivia and Bell "wasn't as epic as it has been teased," but enjoyed the "fascinating" cliffhanger at the end, ultimately calling it a "good" episode. Website blogger io9 listed "Momentum Deferred" as one of the "crucial" episodes new viewers must watch to get into the show. In January 2013, IGN ranked the episode as the third best of the series, explaining that "the early seasons of Fringe specialized in putting Olivia in dire circumstances and letting her fight her way out like a she-boss. 'Momentum Deferred' was one of those episodes, and it brought more exciting moments than most series get in a whole season."
