= Of Human Action =

- Fringe episode
- Episode no.: Season 2 Episode 7
- Directed by: Joe Chappelle
- Written by: Glen Whitman; Robert Chiappetta
- Production code: 3X5107
- Original air date: November 12, 2009

Guest appearances
- Cameron Monaghan as Tyler Carson; Andrew Airlie as James Carson; Vincent Gale as Tom Dobbins; John Tench as Patrick Hicket; Jacqueline Steuart as Renee Davies; Peter Graham-Gaudreau as Seth Davies; Irene Karas as Officer Williams; Doron Bell as Officer Gibson; Ryan Booth as Officer Jenks; Shawn Stewart as Truck driver; Philip Cabrita as Clerk; Anna Van Hooft as Nina's assistant; Michael Cerveris as the Observer

Episode chronology
| ← Previous "Earthling" | Next → "August" |
- Fringe season 2

"Of Human Action" is the seventh episode of the second season of the science fiction/crime series Fringe, and the 27th episode overall. The episode followed a case involving the apparent kidnapping of the son of a scientist working for biotechnology corporation Massive Dynamic, leading the Fringe team to deal with the repercussions of mind control.

The episode was written by the staff-writing team of Glen Whitman and Robert Chiappetta, and was directed by executive producer Joe Chappelle. It first aired in the United States on November 12, 2009 to an estimated 5.89 million viewers. It received generally positive reviews, as multiple critics praised the story despite its characterization as a "standalone" episode.

== Plot ==
In Queens, New York, police chase a sedan driven through a parking garage by two men keeping a teenage boy named Tyler Carson (Cameron Monaghan) in the backseat. Police officers surround the car and draw their weapons, demanding that the men exit the car. They do, and Tyler stays in his seat. Without explanation, one of the officers walks backwards to the parking ramp and jumps to his death. Another officer shoots her two remaining co-workers, then herself. The kidnappers' crime spree continues on the road. One of them, Hickey (John Tench), demands that a convenience store clerk hand over all his cash. Another customer tries to intervene, but then takes a pot of hot coffee, pours the coffee over his own head, and beats himself with the pot. The cashier then electrocutes himself.

Examining the policewoman who shot herself, Walter (John Noble) concludes that she was the victim of mind control rather than hypnosis. Theorizing that the mind control works on an auditory basis, he develops a method of combating the effects through the use of white noise. The tactical team led by Olivia (Anna Torv) traces the kidnappers—both of them car salesmen with no serious criminal record—to a warehouse. One of them drives the car through a large door, but is burnt in the explosion when the car flips. Olivia gets the drop on the surviving kidnapper, who points a gun at his own chin and begs for her help. Peter (Joshua Jackson), wearing headphones that broadcast Walter's white noise, follows the ransom payment. It leads him to Tyler, who says, "You can take off those stupid headphones. They won't work."

Peter is now forced into helping Tyler, who has mind control powers due to his father James (Andrew Airlie) working on thought-controlled weapons systems for Massive Dynamic. Peter tries to get into Tyler's head by sharing his own stories of his father not believing in him, but Tyler rejects the attempts to bond, as he only needs a driver. Their destination is the home of Tyler's mother, whom Tyler had been told was dead. When the two of them meet, Tyler wants her to run off so that they can be together again. She refuses, and Tyler becomes enraged at her husband when he returns home.

Tyler tries to force Peter to shoot the husband, but changes the target to Agent Broyles (Lance Reddick) when he arrives at the house with Olivia. Peter is forced to shoot Broyles, but manages to pull the gun off-center so that the agent is only hit in the shoulder. After Peter crashes the car that both he and Tyler are in, Tyler is brought unconscious into custody. Nina Sharp (Blair Brown) writes a message to the absent William Bell updating him on the status of the "Carson-Penrose" experiments (Claus Penrose is a scientist seen caring for a genetically engineered killer in the much earlier episode "The Same Old Story"). Tyler is one of many identical boys placed with foster families, and James was his assigned guardian, not his father.

== Production ==
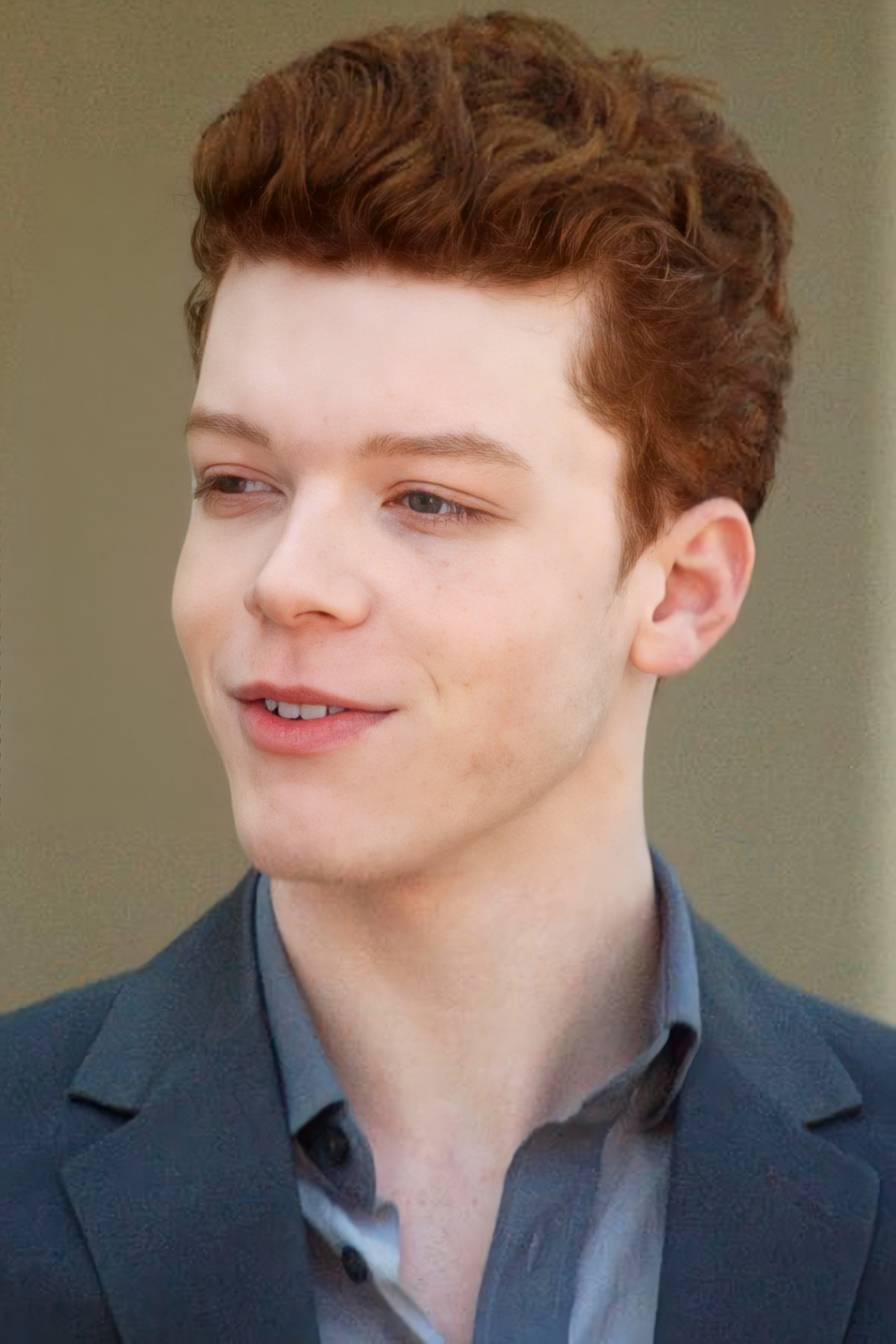
"Of Human Action" featured a guest performance by Cameron Monaghan (pictured in 2012).

"Of Human Action" was written by frequent writing partners Glen Whitman and Robert Chiappetta, and was directed by executive producer Joe Chappelle. It was shot in Vancouver in September 2009; the crew wrapped up production during the middle of the month, and then immediately moved on to the following episode, "August".

To simulate the police officer falling in the opening scene, the special effects department had the stunt double fall 52 feet onto an 18x24 feet airbag, which they referred to as "old-fashioned" because they used the airbag rather than wires. Trevor Jones, the stuntman doing the scene, commented during shooting that his fall had a small margin of error, because of the small airbag and cement walls surrounding the area, "if you land off center maybe three or four feet, then you're going to get pitched in that direction". To aid Jones, a large X was placed on the airbag. A scene later in the episode involves a car fleeing through a garage door, only to hit a concrete wall, flip over, and burst into flames. To create the scene, the crew used two externally identical cars; one was drivable, and the other was a shell of car, and was hooked to a cable rig. After taking a week to get everything set up, the crew used a nitrogen cannon to launch the second, undrivable car through the garage door via wires.

The episode featured a guest performance by Cameron Monaghan as the mind controller Tyler Carson. The actor tweeted after the episode's broadcast, "Fringe was cool. What person in the world doesn't wish they had mind-controll [sic] powers!" "Of Human Action" also had guest appearances by Andrew Airlie, Peter Graham-Gaudreau, John Tench, Vincent Gale, Jacqueline Ann Steuart, and Doron Bell Jr.

== Music and cultural references ==
"Of Human Action" featured two songs, "Subtle Duck" by Charles Bissell and "Angel Love" by Samantha James. In honor of The Simpsons's 20th anniversary, several shows in Fox's lineup contained references to the show. In "Of Human Action", Tyler uses a Homer Simpson Pez dispenser to store his mind-control drugs, and the town he and Peter journey to is Springfield, the same name of the town in The Simpsons; when Springfield appears in the sky, no state is shown, just like the ambiguity concerning the home state of The Simpsons.

== Reception ==
=== Ratings ===
On its initial November 12, 2009 broadcast in the United States, "Of Human Action" was watched by an estimated 5.89 million viewers, and earned a 2.2 ratings share among adults 18–49, tying the season average. This was a 29 percent increase from the previous episode's 1.7 rating, though that episode's low ratings have been attributed to the unexpected end to the 2009 World Series. Despite the ratings improvement, "Of Human Action" led Fringe to finish in fourth place for its timeslot.

=== Reviews ===
"Of Human Action" received a very positive reaction from MTV's Josh Wigler, writing "As a stand-alone episode with some interesting character insight, this week's Fringe was a success. It might also be a mythological success, too, should the big reveal at the end—the fact that Massive Dynamic has inundated multiple children with telepathic abilities—pan out in future episodes." Andrew Hanson of the Los Angeles Times enjoyed being able to see more of Massive Dynamic, and praised Astrid's increased presence in the plot. Airlock Alpha writer Tiffany Vogt called it a "gripping story with much emotional resonance," especially with the father-son parallels between Peter and Tyler.

"It was a taut episode in pacing, storytelling, and character interaction."

— Airlock Alpha writer Tiffany Vogt

The A.V. Club's Noel Murray had a more mixed reaction, giving the episode a rating of C+ and criticizing lead guest actor Cameron Monaghan, "In this role, he was a drag, playing 'rebellious teen' in a stock, wooden way, with no extra layers. Also, nobody—not even Joshua Jackson, whom I've come to appreciate more as an actor over the run of this show—could make the 'My mind is being controlled!' scenes look anything other than goofy." Murray also said, "Yet for all my griping, I was quite taken with the theme of this episode, and the motifs that writers Robert Chiappetta and Glen Whitman and director Joe Chappelle used to support it. From the tinfoil Peter Pan hats that Walter and Astrid wear to Tyler popping the medication that grants him his powers out of a Pez dispenser, there's a lot in 'Of Human Action' about childish things." Ramsey Isler from IGN graded the episode 8.0/10, explaining that despite it being a "standalone" episode, it was "a high-intensity, action-filled tale that kept the adrenaline flowing. Fringe is usually more of a cerebral show, but there's nothing wrong with appealing to our love of action every now and then". Also positive was Chanel Reeder of Newsarama, who believed Fringe "totally deliver[ed] in its most recent episode. The twists are back, along with the dramatic high intensity moments that the show is known for." Reeder praised the plot twist of Tyler being the mind controller, and was pleased with the increased presence of Massive Dynamic.
