= The Plateau (Fringe) =

- Fringe episode
- Milo predicts every scenario while fleeing Olivia
- Episode no.: Season 3 Episode 3
- Directed by: Brad Anderson
- Written by: Alison Schapker; Monica Owusu-Breen
- Production code: 3X6103
- Original air date: October 7, 2010
- Running time: 43 minutes

Guest appearances
- Kirk Acevedo as Charlie Francis; Seth Gabel as Lincoln Lee; Michael Eklund as Milo Stanfield; Kacey Rohl as Madeline Stanfield; Malcolm Stewart as Dr. Levin; Ryan McDonald as Brandon Fayette; Philip Winchester as Frank Stanton

Episode chronology
← Previous "The Box"	Next → "Do Shapeshifters Dream of Electric Sheep?"
- Fringe season 3

"The Plateau" is the third episode of the third season of the American science fiction drama television series Fringe, and the 46th episode overall. As one of the early Season 3 episodes that take place entirely in the parallel universe, the episode centers on Olivia, conditioned to believe she is a member of the alternate Fringe team, trying to track down a mentally unstable man that can predict the team's every move.

"The Plateau" was co-written by Monica Owusu-Breen and Alison Schapker, and directed by Brad Anderson. It featured the only appearance of guest actor Michael Eklund, who played the episode's antagonist Milo Stanfield. It first aired on October 7, 2010 to an estimated 5.2 million viewers. Reviews of the episode were mostly positive, and many praised the storyline and Eklund's performance.

== Plot ==
Olivia (Anna Torv), trapped in the parallel universe, has been conditioned with drugs to believe she is her doppelganger, "Fauxlivia", by Walternate (John Noble), and has been integrated into the alternate Fringe team, though she is haunted by images of Peter (Joshua Jackson) and Walter (Noble) from the prime universe.

She, Charlie (Kirk Acevedo), and Lincoln (Seth Gabel) are called to the scene of an accident where a pedestrian has been run over by a bus, nearly duplicating events of a similar bus accident the day before, a statistical impossibility according to Astrid (Jasika Nicole). Olivia finds a ball-point pen at the scene, a rarity in the parallel universe because of the adoption of digital interfaces. Evidence suggests that the discovery of the pen by a bystander created a sequence of reactions that led to the victim's death. The next day, another pedestrian is wounded in a bus accident. As the Fringe team investigates the scene, finding another pen, a bystander is struck and killed by an ambulance. Olivia spots a suspicious man in the crowds, but he uses a seemingly random series of happenstance events to get away.

Olivia discovers ties between the three victims and a medical center. At the center, Dr. Levin (Malcolm Stewart) explains they help mentally challenged patients with experimental processes to boost their intelligence; Olivia observes how one set of patients uses pens as they are unable to cope with digital devices. When Olivia and Charlie discuss the victims with Dr. Levin, he is able to identify their culprit as Milo (Michael Eklund), a patient taking an experimental drug to boost his IQ exponentially. Though released to care of his sole remaining family member Madeline (Kacey Rohl), he was scheduled to return to reverse the process for his own health and safety. Dr. Levin identifies all three victims as those charged to return Milo to the center, the last victim only having been selected the day before. They visit Madeline, who worries for the safety of her brother. She explains that Milo is able to predict the outcome of numerous events to the smallest detail, and only by showing him a toy horse, a connection to their deceased parents, she can break Milo's concentration. She provides Olivia and Charlie the location of the hotel that Milo is staying at.

As they return to the city, Olivia and Charlie discuss plans with Astrid on how to capture Milo, but realize that since he can predict their every move, any plan would be futile, and approach the hotel directly. Milo leads Olivia on a chase through a construction area including a marked zone where the air is too thin, expecting to crush her under a load of cement bricks. Olivia, unaware of the warning signs for the zone, races through it instead of stopping to put on a respirator, nearly asphyxiating herself, and dodges the bricks in time to capture Milo. At the center, Dr. Levin notes that Milo's condition is too far advanced to reverse, and only a computer is able to keep up with his thoughts. Madeline sadly leaves the toy horse at Milo's side.

That evening, Olivia has a vision of Peter; the vision tries to break Olivia from the conditioning, explaining that her lack of knowledge of the parallel universe saved her life.

== Production ==
"This is a really kind of cool episode because it ‘s really a kind of procedural episode, one of our kind of standalones, except it’s on the other side"

— Anna Torv

In late March 2010, Brothers & Sisters showrunners Monica Owusu-Breen and Alison Schapker were hired as co-executive producers for Fringe. The two had previously worked with Fringe co-creators Roberto Orci, J. J. Abrams, and Alex Kurtzman on Alias, and again with Abrams on Lost. "The Plateau" marked the first Fringe episode they co-wrote. Editor Timothy A. Good also joined the series, making "The Plateau" his first Fringe episode. Good called the episode one of two parts– the second half was the season's eighteenth episode "Bloodline", which Breen and Schapker also co-wrote. The episode premise was inspired by executive producer J.H. Wyman's son, who came up with the idea that a man could be smart enough to predict events. "The Plateau" marked the first appearance of a fringe case in the parallel universe.

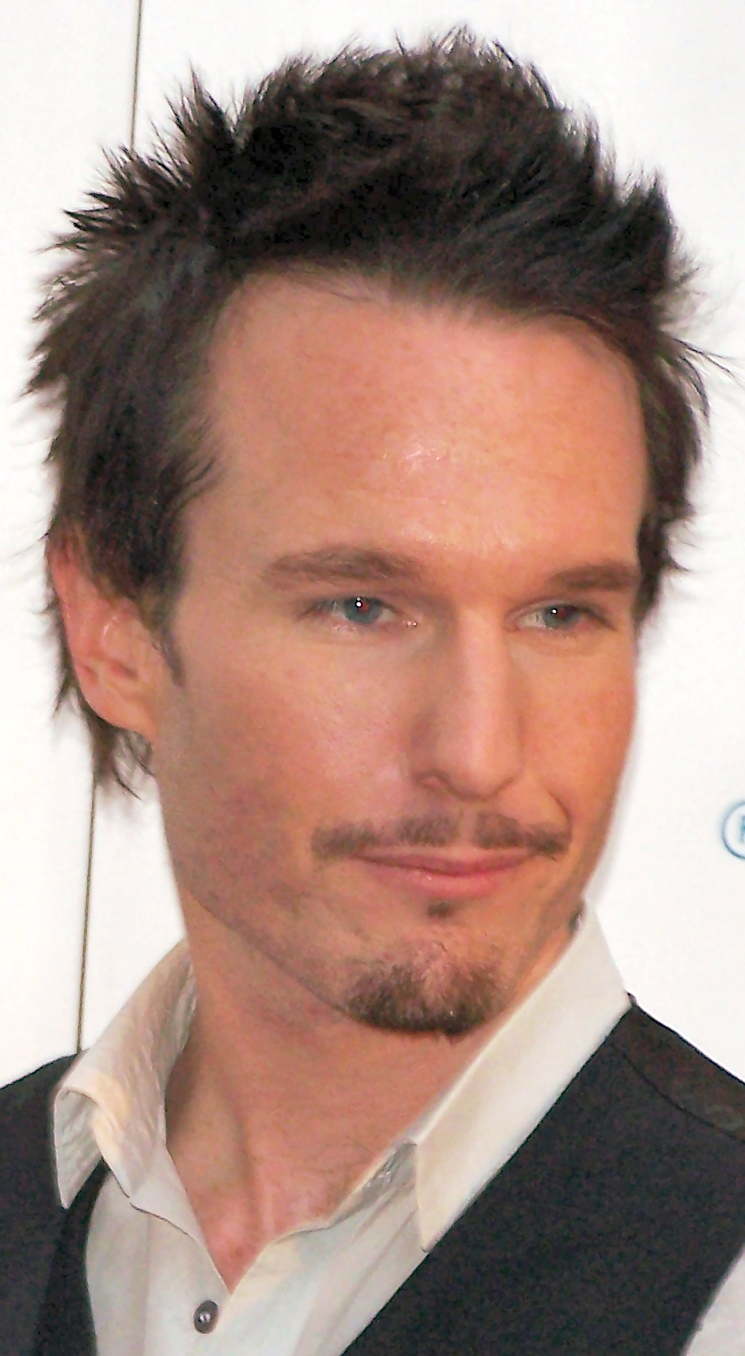
"The Plateau"'s storyline focused on Milo Stanfield (played by Michael Eklund), a man able to predict seemingly unpredictable events.

The episode featured the return of guest stars Kirk Acevedo, Ryan McDonald, Seth Gabel, and Philip Winchester. New guest actors included Michael Eklund as the antagonist Milo Stanfield, Malcolm Stewart as Dr. Levin, and Kacey Rohl as Madeline. Eklund and other actors auditioned in Vancouver, and the producers reviewed tapes of their previous work. As executive producer Jeff Pinkner explains, "We got incredibly lucky casting Michael Eklund for this role... he really created this character." "The Plateau" was the first episode of the third season to feature "Alt-Astrid", the prime universe Astrid's doppelganger. Actress Jasika Nicole depicted her to have autistic characteristics, as Nicole has a sister with the disorder. The producers decided this would be the one doppelganger to have actual genetic differences from their counterpart, with Nicole believing her two characters possessed the greatest contrast among all of the doppelgangers.

Former Fringe producer Brad Anderson served as the episodes director. The episode was shot in August 2010, partly on Hastings Street in Vancouver. Anderson filmed the opening sequence in one day, which Owusu-Bree praised as "unbelievable." The crew employed a stunt double for some of Eklund's more physical scenes, such as when he jumps onto a moving bus. Pinkner called the bus scene his favorite stunt on the series thus far. The hospital where Olivia and Charlie interview the drug trial doctor was filmed at the Toronto Public Library. There, the video the doctor showed them was added later by effects supervisor Jay Worth, forcing the actors to fake reactions to the images displayed.

As with other Fringe episodes, Fox released a science lesson plan in collaboration with Science Olympiad for grade school children focusing on the science seen in "The Plateau", with the intention of having "students learn about chain reactions, where small changes result in additional changes, leading to a self-propagating chain of events."

== Reception ==
=== Ratings ===
On its first broadcast on October 7, 2010, "The Plateau" was watched by an estimated 5.2 million viewers, earning a 2.0/5 ratings share for adults between the ages 18 and 49. Time shifting viewing increased the episode's ratings by 39 percent, finishing with a 2.8 rating among adults.

=== Reviews ===
Entertainment Weekly's Ken Tucker called the episode "at once cool-looking, heart-tugging, and pretty simple", especially when compared to previous episodes like "White Tulip". Writing for The A.V. Club, Noel Murray graded the episode with an A, explaining "I can't really find anything to complain about here. The direction was effectively moody and snappy, the performances were sharp, and the case was cool." Murray praised the subtle characteristics of the parallel universe, the action scenes, and the use of split-screens to visually show Milo's predictions. MTV's Josh Wigler believed that the episode "demonstrated how the mystery-of-the-week format can still be compelling: by taking everything familiar and applying a stark new layer of paint." Andrew Hanson of the Los Angeles Times wrote "The third season of Fringe continues to get better with each episode. Most importantly, it has momentum. It's moving forward with a distinct destination, and even though I know Fringe is heading somewhere, I have no idea where that might be, or what's going to happen when we get there. Boy, if you're not watching Fringe, you're missing out."

"A very good episode, especially because I am not crazy about the "Red" episodes (I fear change). The notion of someone essentially being able to predict chaos theory is fascinating. It's like a more scientific version of someone being able to see into the future. It also made for a fast-paced episode. Some of the explanations were hilariously complex, like Astrid getting stuck in an infinite loop trying to figure out the probability that Milo was setting up Olivia or not setting up Olivia. It was craziness."

— Fearnet reviewer Alyse Wax

SFScope contributor Sarah Stegall thought the episode was similar to Flowers for Algernon, but was skeptical of the premise that Milo could predict every event before they happened. She criticized the decision to make Milo "coldly calculating", writing "This is but another version of the tired cliché of the stoic intellectual, the intelligent person who has no heart or emotions. Why are we so afraid of smart people?... It always annoys me when science fiction writers, of all people, diss their own audience with the idea that intellectuals are dangerous." Stegall was pleased to have the first "standalone" episode of the season, explaining that it was the first where she could "relax and enjoy... the tying together of a standalone with a mythology theme was absolutely brilliant." Fearnet contributor Alyse Wax enjoyed the episode, but also thought "the idea that [drugs] could turn someone into a cartoonish evil genius is pretty farfetched."

Many critics praised Eklund and his character, with one calling Milo "spindly, intense, and nicely chilling". In a January 2011 article, The Futon Critic rated "The Plateau" the twenty-first best television episode of 2010 out of a list of fifty. The A.V. Club ranked Fringe the 15th best show of 2010, in particular citing "The Plateau" as a justification. Jeff Jensen of Entertainment Weekly named "The Plateau" the thirteenth best episode of the series, explaining "The first half of Fringe's celebrated third season alternated between episodes set in the over here and over there worlds. In a tough call, we say the best of the over there stand-alones was this brainy thriller about a dude with a low I.Q. who got an intelligence boost via nootopic drugs, and found himself becoming smarter and smarter, and more and more humanly detached, and causing chaos and death by concocting intricate chain reaction events." In a similar list, Den of Geek named it the eighth best episode of the series, explaining that "The Plateau" stood out as "the best of a good crop of episodes" among the parallel universe storylines because of its villain and its use of Lincoln Lee, Charlie, and Olivia in action."
