= List of Dragnet (2003 TV series) episodes =

This is a list of episodes of the Dragnet television series that began in 2003. For the second season, the title was altered to L.A. Dragnet. The last two episodes (#21 and #22) first aired in France, the series having been canceled in the United States before they could air.

== Series overview ==
Season	Episodes	Originally released	
Season	Episodes	First released	Last released
1	12	February 2, 2003	May 11, 2003
2	10	October 4, 2003	December 4, 2004

== Episodes ==
=== Season 1 (2003) ===
No. overall	No. in season	Title	Directed by	Written by	Original release date	Prod. code
1	1	"The Silver Slayer"	Jean de Segonzac	Tyler Bensinger	February 2, 2003	E3408
Detectives Joe Friday (Ed O'Neill) and Frank Smith (Ethan Embry) investigate a series of killings in which the murdered women have silver paint on their bodies. Their investigation soon ties into the anniversary of a murder spree from a quarter century earlier when they discover that evidence obtained from the murder spree of the past has been disappearing.
2	2	"The Big Ruckus"	Kevin Hooks	Jay Beattie (s/t), Dan Dworkin (s/t), Marc Guggenheim (s)	February 9, 2003	E3402
A rich college student is found dead at MacArthur park; at first it looks like a drug deal gone bad, but it turns out to have nothing to do with drugs.
3	3	"All That Glitters"	Darnell Martin	Robert Port	February 16, 2003	E3406
The police investigate the brutal slaying of a movie producer whose body is found on the side of Mulholland Drive.
4	4	"Well Endowed"	Andy Wolk	Walon Green	February 23, 2003	E3404
While investigating the brutal murder of a little-known actress, Detectives Friday and Smith come across a number of people who might have information including a tabloid journalist, a wannabe porn star and a socially prominent Los Angeles family.
5	5	"The Cutting of the Swath"	Guy Norman Bee	Dan Dworkin, Jay Beattie	March 2, 2003	E3413
Friday and Smith race to find the son of a deranged man who's intent on killing his entire family.
6	6	"The Brass Ring"	Juan J. Campanella	Robert Nathan	March 9, 2003	E3405
The fiancé of a rising young Hollywood actress is found stabbed to death in the Hollywood Hills. Detectives Friday and Smith visit a movie studio head and a drug dealer to look for clues and find a shocking secret.
7	7	"The Artful Dodger"	Thomas J. Wright	Dan Dworkin, Jay Beattie	March 16, 2003	E3409
A customer is killed during a multimillion dollar jewelry robbery. During the investigation, Friday and Smith meet a British insurance company P.I. who attempts to use them to recover the stolen jewels. Friday also knocks heads with the arrogant owner of a private security company.
8	8	"Sticks and Stones"	Kevin Dowling	Shannon Goss, Tyler Bensinger	March 30, 2003	E3411
Detectives Friday and Smith investigate the satanic ritual killing of a teen girl. They look at her classmates including one who admits he should be the prime suspect.
9	9	"Redemption"	Darnell Martin	Brian Ross	April 6, 2003	E3413
Detective Friday and Detective Beltran (Lauren Velez) find out a hidden secret behind a run-of-the-mill suicide.
10	10	"Let's Make a Deal"	Jean de Segonzac	Tyler Bensinger	April 13, 2003	E3415
A Hollywood super-agent's infant son is kidnapped. It is discovered that the infant is the nanny's. That is the least of the problems for the Detectives on this case.
11	11	"For Whom the Whistle Blows"	Guy Norman Bee	Dan Dworkin, Jay Beattie	April 27, 2003	E3416
A woman, missing for six years, is found dead in her car in a canyon. The suspects in her death include her son, her husband, a lawyer, and the company she worked for.
12	12	"The Little Guy"	Donna Deitch	Robert Nathan	May 11, 2003	E3407
While trying to protect an innocent suspect linked to the criminal Sanchez brothers, Friday puts his career on the line by going after a corrupt cop, and must face the resulting inquiry.

=== Season 2 (2003–04) ===
No. overall	No. in season	Title	Directed by	Written by	Original release date	Prod. code
13	1	"Daddy's Girl"	Steve Shill	Carter Harris	October 4, 2003	E4607
Joe and his crew investigate the murder of a teenager who was burned and left for dead. Family honor is put to the test when the victim's father wants justice while assailant's father protects his child from the law.
14	2	"Coyote"	Kevin Dowling	David Wilcox	October 11, 2003	E4602
The detectives discover a major prostitution ring while investigating a woman's murder.
15	3	"17 in 6"	Paul Shapiro	Josh Pate	October 18, 2003	E4605
Detective Raymond Cooper (Evan Parke) looks for help to find those involved in a deadly gang war.
16	4	"The Magic Bullet"	Aaron Lipstadt	Dan Dworkin, Jay Beattie	October 25, 2003	E4603
The death of a fan at a wild Hollywood party leads the detectives to a record producer with a gun fetish.
17	5	"Slice of Life"	John Behring	David Wilcox	November 1, 2003	E4601
When fishermen find a woman's headless body offshore, detectives discover she had recently given birth, but there was no sign of the baby.
18	6	"Abduction"	Keith Samples	Jonas Pate	April 21, 2004	E4601
The detectives investigate the abduction and killing of the son of a couple involved in an alternative lifestyle.
19	7	"Frame of Mind"	Joe Ann Fogle	Tyler Bensinger	April 28, 2004	E4606
The killing of a traveling salesman maybe connected to the unsolved murder of an adult movie star's father.
20	8	"Retribution"	Jeffrey Reiner	Philippe Browning	May 5, 2004	E4604
Detectives suspect an alleged victim of sexual abuse is responsible for decapitating an Orthodox priest.
21	9	"Riddance"	Steve Shill	Dan Dworkin, Jay Beattie	December 4, 2004	E4609
The deaths of an artist and his girlfriend lead investigators to a case of poisoned drugs. They arrest the dealer, but must find the manufacturer to prevent further deaths.
22	10	"Killing Fields"	Kevin Dowling	Tyler Bensinger, Steve Gottfried	December 4, 2004	E4610
When a man is arrested for shoplifting while using a missing person's car, the police find the belongings of two other missing people in the car. The suspect kills himself while in custody. Soon afterward, the detectives find in his house not only torture elements and videos but also human bones and several graves; one of the videos indicates that there was an accomplice.
