= Eric the Actor =

American actor (1975–2014)

- Born: Eric Shaun Lynch; March 11, 1975; San Pablo, California, U.S.
- Died: September 20, 2014 (aged 39); Sacramento, California, U.S.
- Occupations: Actor; radio personality
- Years active: 2005–2014

Eric Shaun Lynch (March 11, 1975 – September 20, 2014), also known as Eric the Midget and Eric the Actor, was a member of The Howard Stern Show's Wack Pack. Lynch was, at his peak, 3 ft 5 in (1.04 m) tall, weighed 85 lb (39 kg), and had various health issues, including Ehlers–Danlos syndrome.

Lynch used a motorized wheelchair for mobility. Despite his poor health, he claimed to have outlived every doctor's prediction for his life expectancy.

== Medical conditions ==
Eric's height was cited at between 3 ft 0 in (0.91 m) and 3 ft 5 in (1.04 m), which is within the threshold to be considered to have dwarfism. Because of his short legs, weak joints, and a club foot, he employed a wheelchair to get around. His other conditions included stork bite, which gave him a "blotchy" complexion; Ehlers–Danlos Syndrome, which resulted in gnarled fingers; and premature gray hair.

== The Howard Stern Show ==
Eric initially called in on September 19, 2002, to discuss American Idol. Lynch had called to respond to Stern's statements that contestant Kelly Clarkson was not overly attractive. Stern initially talked to Lynch with mild enthusiasm, but after an extended discussion regarding Lynch's unique voice and speaking style, Lynch revealed that he was 3 ft 5 in (1.04 m) tall, which piqued Stern's interest. Eric was frequently at odds with The Howard Stern Show, its staff, its callers, and its guests.

Eric made one in-studio appearance on November 3, 2008, alongside two prostitutes from the Bunny Ranch. Also present were Dixie Chicks singer Natalie Maines, wrestler Kurt Angle, and American Idol alumna Diana DeGarmo.

== Other media ==
Eric preferred to be called Eric the Actor. For legal reasons, Eric requested that his full official title be "Eric the Actor, formerly known as Eric the Midget" in order to protect the "Eric the Midget" trade name. Lynch made his television debut in a cameo on American Dreams in 2005. Lynch also appeared on Fringe in 2010, In Plain Sight in 2012, and Legit in 2014. Eric appeared on Jimmy Kimmel Live! in 2008.

Eric also participated in a number of podcasting ventures. He hosted American Idol and America's Got Talent wrap-up shows including an American Idol discussion show on Howard 101 which featured Brian Dunkleman as co-host. He made appearances on TNA Wrestling's web offering TNA Today alongside wrestling personalities Mike Tenay and Jeremy Borash in 2012.

== Death ==
On September 20, 2014, Lynch was admitted to a hospital because of heart problems. After arriving, Lynch's liver and kidneys began to shut down and he died.

On September 21, Lynch's longtime friend and manager Johnny Fratto became the first to report his death. Fratto tweeted "I am so sorry and so sad to inform everyone that my friend Eric "The Actor" Lynch passed away yesterday afternoon!!!"

News of Lynch's death received considerable media attention with outlets as high profile as Variety, The Hollywood Reporter, CNN, and TMZ all reporting his death. Celebrities including Zach Braff, Zac Efron, and Diana Degarmo among others Tweeted their condolences, with Eric's trademark sign-off "bye for now" trending number one as a Twitter Hashtag. Jimmy Kimmel was so upset by the news that he called The Stern Show first thing on September 22, even though he had an infant child and it was only 4:00 am Pacific Daylight Time during the broadcast. Eric, a huge fan of WWE and the Oakland A's, was mourned during telecasts of both organizations, with the on-air personalities signing off the A's broadcast by saying "bye for now." Eric's roommate Jon spoke with Howard and encouraged fans to have Eric's favorite foods, Pepsi and bacon, in his honor.

Lynch was buried at Oakmont Memorial Park in Lafayette, California.

== Filmography ==
Television
Year	Title	Role	Episode
2005	American Dreams	Eric	"It's My Life"
2010	Fringe	Homeless Man	"The Box"
2012	In Plain Sight	Landlord	"Four Marshals and a Baby"
2014	Legit	Big Pete	"Weekend"
