= Night of Desirable Objects =

- Fringe episode
- Peter and Olivia exhume the coffins of Andre Hughes' wife and son
- Episode no.: Season 2 Episode 2
- Directed by: Brad Anderson
- Written by: Jeff Pinkner; J. H. Wyman
- Production code: 3X5102
- Original air date: September 24, 2009

Guest appearances
- Meghan Markle as Agent Amy Jessup; John Savage as Andre Hughes; Kevin Corrigan as Sam Weiss; Charles Martin Smith as Sheriff Golightly; Stefan Arngrim as the Store Owner; Michael Cerveris as the Observer

Episode chronology
← Previous "A New Day in the Old Town"	Next → "Fracture"
- Fringe season 2

"Night of Desirable Objects" is the second episode of the second season of the American science fiction drama television series Fringe. The episode followed Olivia and Peter's investigation into mysterious disappearances taking place in a small Pennsylvania town.

The episode was written by executive producers/showrunners Jeff Pinkner and J. H. Wyman, and directed by Brad Anderson. It was the last episode to feature guest actress Meghan Markle as Agent Amy Jessup, but was the first with recurring guest actor Kevin Corrigan.

"Night of Desirable Objects" premiered on September 24, 2009 to an estimated 7.73 million viewers in the United States. It received generally positive reviews, as multiple critics praised the storyline while at the same time acknowledging it did little to advance the show's mythology.

== Plot ==
In Lansdale, Pennsylvania, a highway construction worker hears an odd noise in a cornfield, and is pulled down into a tunnel by a mysterious, unidentified creature. Using a lighter for sight, he sees the remains of other creatures, and is then eaten by the creature off screen. Meanwhile, Walter (John Noble) investigates Olivia's (Anna Torv) car crash from the previous episode. He believes she traveled to a parallel universe that is similar to theirs, but she still cannot remember whom she met with, or why.

Having recovered enough from the events of the previous episode, Olivia is released from the hospital, and is watched by the shapeshifter who has killed Charlie Francis (Kirk Acevedo) and adopted his appearance. Peter (Joshua Jackson) learns of mysterious disappearances taking place in Lansdale, and the Fringe team arrives to investigate. Walter finds a blue, paralytic substance at the scene, which he suspects is from mutated DNA. The investigation leads to a local resident, Andre Hughes (John Savage), who tells them he lost his wife and baby in childbirth. Olivia begins to develop super-hearing as a result of crossing to the parallel universe, and hears someone else in Hughes' house despite his saying he's the only one there. She ventures upstairs to investigate; after failing to find anything, she accidentally fires her weapon, narrowly missing Peter. They bring Hughes in for questioning, and he refuses to give them a blood sample for their investigation.

Nina Sharp (Blair Brown) talks with Olivia, and recommends she see a friend, Sam Weiss (Kevin Corrigan) "who helped put [her] back together" after she was diagnosed with cancer. Agent Amy Jessup (Meghan Markle) says she believes Hughes may have killed his wife and son. When they exhume their bodies, they find the baby's casket is empty. Hughes commits suicide however before they can question him further.

Walter discovers that Hughes' wife had a form of lupus, and was incapable of having children. Hughes genetically altered the baby to enable his survival, and after birth, it developed into a "superbaby" and began feeding on people. Olivia and Peter travel back to Hughes' house, and are attacked by the creature when investigating the basement and its nearby tunnels. The creature attempts to escape by digging out but is killed by a police car parked above ground upon collapsing into the tunnel, thereby crushing the creature.

At Nina's recommendation, Olivia meets with Sam Weiss, who works at a bowling alley. He tells her to expect headaches as one consequence of crossing universes. The final scene shows the shapeshifted Charlie communicating with someone from the parallel universe, who tells him to help make Olivia remember her experience crossing over.

== Production ==
"We don't know the boundaries of Olivia's hearing so the events could come from her paranoia, anywhere in the building, or somewhere far away."

— Sound editor Bruce Tanis on Olivia's sudden superhearing.

Executive producers and showrunners Jeff Pinkner and J. H. Wyman wrote the episode, while filmmaker Brad Anderson served as the director, his first such credit for the season.

The show's sound production team had two major special effects to create for the episode: the mole creature, and Olivia's superhearing. They decided to voice the creature using Automated Dialogue Replacement (ADR) "because his range of actions and emotions was simply too broad for a library monster vocal set to cover". Sound editor Bruce Tanis cut "creepy moans and breaths" when the creature was heard but not seen, and added "a layer of vicious attack growls and wounded screams" for when it died. Tanis commented that the actor voicing the creature placed pieces of orange in his mouth in order to have "a slobbery, sputtering voice". For Olivia's scenes with superhearing, Tanis made ordinary, far off items like phones, typewriters, and cars "sound a little beefier than normal and kept them a bit more up in the mix than they usually would be," as these things were not in the same room as her. The sound editors wanted to emphasize that the various sounds she hears could be coming from anywhere, such as next door, or a block away, or could perhaps be all inside her head. Torv later noted in a BuddyTV interview that while shooting, she was unsure whether her newfound abilities were permanent or temporary, to which the writers replied that "apparently it's just something that comes and goes". After expressing her confusion, they responded "Oh that's good, Olivia's confused too".

"Night of Desirable Objects" was the first episode to feature guest actor Kevin Corrigan as the mysterious Sam Weiss. To help Corrigan, Torv compared Sam Weiss to the Oracle in The Matrix, which the actor had not yet seen. Corrigan noted, "It opened my mind up... So now Sam's just this regular guy in a bowling alley but he's so much more than that." Weiss' appearance generated some rumors that he was a figment of Olivia's imagination, causing actress Anna Torv to state in a later interview that she has always believed Weiss to be "100 percent real" and her character's "guide". Frequent Fringe collaborator Akiva Goldsman later hinted in January 2010 that audiences have "not seen the last of Agent Jessup", played by Meghan Markle. However, the episode marked the last appearance of Markle. Other guest stars included John Savage and Charles Martin Smith, as well as Stefan Arngrim, who made his second appearance on the series.

== Reception ==
=== Ratings ===
On its initial broadcast in the United States on September 24, 2009, the episode was watched by an estimated 7.73 million viewers. It earned a 3.6/6 ratings share, which was a decrease of 20 percent from the season premiere. Fringe faced tough competition from CBS's CSI: Crime Scene Investigation and ABC's Grey's Anatomy, causing Fox to place fourth for the night.

=== Reviews ===
"I said last week that this show was the successor to The X-Files. This episode nailed that assertion down. I have never before seen an episode that so closely resembled that much beloved show—all that was missing was Mark Snow's music to make me believe I had stumbled into a long-lost, forgotten episode (well, that, and the absence of David Duchovny and Gillian Anderson)... The creepy atmosphere, the brooding skies of Vancouver, the general air of secrets and mystery all contributed to a wonderfully creepy episode, full of all the surprises and even revulsion of Chris Carter's masterpiece. I have to admit, as well, that Walter Bishop's explanations make a hell of a lot more sense than Mulder's."

— SFScope reviewer Sarah Stegall

The episode received mostly positive reviews. Writing for The A.V. Club, critic Noel Murray graded the episode with an A−, explaining he thought the episode worked well because the monster was "cool," the newly super-powered Olivia was "intriguing," and the little episode quirks (such as a typewriter communicating messages) helped to give Fringe "its own flavor". Ramsey Isler from IGN rated the episode 8.1/10, writing that despite its "relative insignificance" at explaining more show mythology, it "was still very well done, creepy as hell, and pretty entertaining". He also praised the main actors' performances, but wished Fringe would answer more questions and produce less "monster-of-the-week" episodes.

Andrew Hanson of the Los Angeles Times wrote he recognizes the show is trying to define itself, and compared Peter's newfound leadership to The X-Files' Fox Mulder, praised Acevedo's performance as "evil Charlie," but found some of Walter's mannerisms to be "cheesy". SFScope writer Sarah Stegall lauded the premise of multiple universes, and called the episode's horror elements the reason she is now "a devoted fan of this show". Stegall also praised Kirk Acevedo's performance as well as the parallels between Andrea Hughes and Walter; she concluded "This may have been the best episode of this entire series, second perhaps to last season's finale, and certainly better than anything the anemic Grey's Anatomy or the aging CSI can offer".

On the other hand, MTV's Josh Wigler thought the episode's mystery was "barely compelling" when compared to the aftereffects of Olivia's journey to the parallel universe, and wished that more time had been focused on this. Though he understood that Fringe "rides a fine line between an ongoing drama and a series of stand-alone stories," Wigler believed the show would have to choose one soon, and wanted the focus to be on the former and its parallel universe storyline. UGO Networks writer Alex Zalben later compared "Night of Desirable Objects" to the similarly plotted episodes "Johari Window" of Fringe and "Home" of The X-Files. Zalben found "Home" to be superior, explaining that "the two Fringe eps are basically the one X-Files ep split in two," and "clearly, 'Home' was a good enough episode to inspire [them]. Advantage? X-Files."

=== Awards and nominations ===
"Night of Desirable Objects" was nominated for "Best Sound Editing: Short Form Music in Television" at the Motion Picture Sound Editors' 2010 Golden Reel Awards; "Unleashed", an episode from the first season, was the only other Fringe episode to be nominated. "Night of Desirable Objects" lost to the pilot of Glee.
