= Fracture (Fringe) =

- Fringe episode
- Olivia, Walter, Peter, and Broyles investigate the opening scene's explosion, and realize Walter's object is a human ear.
- Episode no.: Season 2 Episode 3
- Directed by: Bryan Spicer
- Written by: David Wilcox
- Production code: 3X5103
- Original air date: October 1, 2009

Guest appearances
- Michael Cerveris as the Observer; Kevin Corrigan as Sam Weiss; Stephen McHattie as Colonel Raymond Gordon; Navid Negahban as Dr. Malik Yusef; Claudette Mink as Captain Diane Burgess; Patrick Sabongui as Ahmed; Barclay Hope as Andrew Burgess; Kirsten Robek as Susan Gillespie; Aaron Pearl as Agent Tevez; Phillip Mitchell as Officer Daniel Gillespie; Dalila Bela as Jenny Burgess

Episode chronology
← Previous "Night of Desirable Objects"	Next → "Momentum Deferred"
- Fringe season 2

"Fracture" is the third episode of the second season of the American science fiction drama television series Fringe. The episode followed the Fringe team's investigation into a man who mysteriously hardens and then explodes, killing those around him. The case leads them to a secret government project and an AWOL colonel.

The episode was written by David Wilcox, and was directed by Bryan Spicer. "Fracture" was the third of a four-episode plot arc called the "gun arc", which focused on Olivia's physical and mental recovery from the season premiere. It featured guest actors Kevin Corrigan and Stephen McHattie. "Fracture" first broadcast in the United States on October 1, 2009 on the Fox network to an estimated 6.21 million viewers. It received generally mixed reviews from critics.

== Plot ==
In Philadelphia, an on-duty cop gets a call from a man he calls "Colonel" to pick up a briefcase at Suburban Station. As he does so, a nearby pulse causes electronics to gain static, and his body becomes hardened. He explodes, killing eleven people and injuring others with his hardened body parts. Initially thinking the explosion was caused by a bomb, the Fringe team arrives to investigate, and discover that instead of a bomb, the cop's body parts killed the others. A further autopsy reveals needle marks between the cop's toes, and they realize he was injecting some type of drug every day for at least a year.

While Peter and Olivia interview his wife, Olivia gets sick with flashes of crossing to the parallel universe, and accidentally discovers the drugs the cop was injecting. The cop had served in Iraq a year previously, and was involved in a secret military experiment called "Project Tin Man". Peter tells them they can find the project's doctors, and he and Olivia travel to Iraq. Peter learns from an old acquaintance the identity of one of the Iraqi doctors; he tells them the project was meant to cure soldiers exposed to a fatal chemical, but it failed to work, instead turning remaining survivors into human bombs. An AWOL colonel, Raymond Gordon, was opposed to ending the project; Peter and Olivia suspect he is behind the cop's explosion, and caused the deaths by emitting a radio signal. They find a list of names from the experiment, the victim in the train station being one of them. They return to find the surviving members, and are able to prevent the next subject, Diane Burgess, from exploding after she is contacted by Gordon to take a briefcase at a train station. Peter and Olivia find Gordon (Stephen McHattie) at the station, and bring him into custody; the man suggests the bombs were intended to eliminate agents working for the Observer.

In a side plot, Olivia and Sam Weiss continue to meet at the bowling alley, where he subjects her to seemingly menial tasks like tying her shoes and keeping score during games. Although initially finding their conversations useless, he cures Olivia's inability to walk without a cane by the end of the episode.

== Production ==
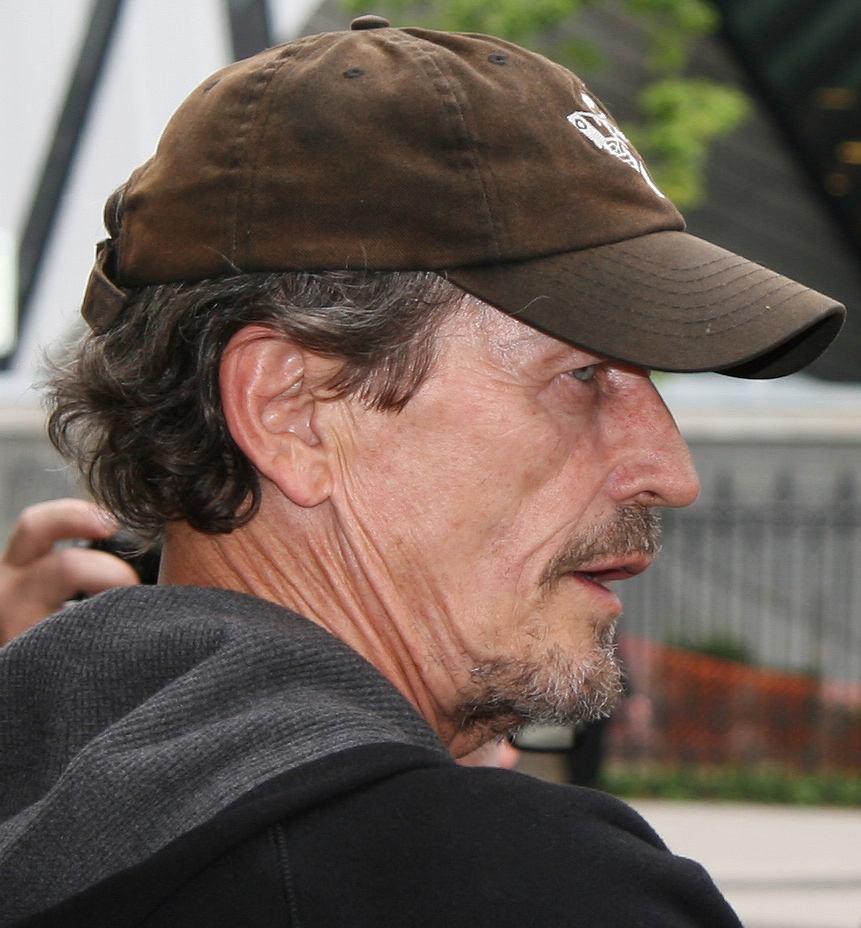
"Fracture" featured the only guest appearance by actor Stephen McHattie.

Co-executive producer David Wilcox wrote the episode, and filmmaker Bryan Spicer directed it. According to producers Ashley Edward Miller and Zack Stentz, "Fracture" was the third episode in the "gun arc", which involved Olivia gradually recovering from the wounds sustained in the premiere enough to be able to wield a gun and fight the shapeshifters.

Sound editor Bruce Tanis explained the production of sound that went into the episode in an interview with Designing Sound:

"In 'Fracture', the villain has created a serum which several characters inject because of a type of post-hypnotic suggestion. He has invented a frequency generator which causes these people to crystallize and then explode. In one of the best scenes all season, Walter and Astrid are in the lab and, using a watermelon for their experiments, are able to determine the exact frequency that the villain’s generator operates on. It was something like 68.7 megacycles (I don’t recall exactly), so I used the signal generator plugin and created some tones that started out as 68.7 megacycles. They were simply low-frequency tones on their own so I processed them so that they warbled and chorused and were a bit more mysterious than the straight tone. It ended up being pretty subtle for television, but when Walter identifies the tone as a certain frequency, that’s what’s actually playing."

Actor John Noble noted that in the episode, "We see [Olivia] broken down. And it's kind of frightening to see our heroine who's carried the series basically... Suddenly she can't move, she can't even load her gun". "Fracture" marked the first and only guest appearance by actor Stephen McHattie as Colonel Raymond Gordon, as well as another appearance by previous guest actor Kevin Corrigan as Sam Weiss.

== Cultural references ==
The episode featured the song "The Air That I Breathe" by The Hollies, as well as music from Roy Orbison, Les Paul, and The Marshall Tucker Band. Olivia makes a reference to Star Wars when she says, "Cut the Yoda crap and tell me what's happening to me". Peter mentions that his father taught him human reproduction using a jigsaw puzzle of "Ms. July", a reference to a glamour photography shot of an unknown Playboy model used in calendars to differentiate each month of the year.

== Reception ==
=== Ratings ===
The episode was initially watched by an estimated 6.21 million viewers in the United States, and scored a 2.3/6 rating share among viewers 18–49 and 3.7/6 for all households. After time shifted viewing was taken into account, Fringe was among the shows with the biggest increase, as its 18–49 rating rose 30 percent to score 3.9.

=== Reviews ===
Reviews of the episode tended to be mixed. Noel Murray from The A.V. Club graded the episode with a D+, writing that "Unlike the previous two weeks’ episodes, which juggled a number of storylines and locations and generated a real sense of Fringe’s expanding milieu, 'Fracture' is so curtailed that it almost feels like it was made for the Fox accountants. The cast is small, the sets are few, and not much happens. The plot’s practically twist-free, until the very end. Large chunks of the episode are given over to Peter talking to Walter about finding a new place for them to live, and Walter trying to learn more about Astrid—and really not discovering much, except that she doesn’t like it when he experiments on fruit. So Astrid’s underused yet again, even in an episode where she gets a lot of lines... The story's too simple and the acting too broad, and yet the episode still felt choppy, as though the Fringe creative team had to scramble to fix 'Fracture' in post."

Conversely, IGN's Ramsey Isler viewed the episode more positively, and rated it 7.9/10. He explained it "deserves praise for doing a lot of things well," and lauded the actors' performances, the props, the direction, and cinematography. Despite however finding Walter less entertaining than the previous season, and believing the first half of the episode moved too slowly and resembled "an ordinary procedural crime show," Isler enjoyed the ending for "[bringing] it all together and [making] the previous 90% worthwhile". After watching the episode, MTV columnist Josh Wigler "declared [his] fondness" for Joshua Jackson, stating the actor had "won [him] over thanks to Peter's central role in these first few episodes of Fringe's" second season". Wigler continued that it was "an excellent mystery-of-the-week episode to be sure, though I'm really itching for more details on the alternate reality. Luckily, that's supposed to come next week with the return of Nimoy's William Bell, which makes tonight's less mythology-oriented outing easier to swallow. Plus, the end reveal with the Observer was pretty spicy, to say the least."
