= A New Day in the Old Town =

- Fringe episode
- Episode no.: Season 2 Episode 1
- Directed by: Akiva Goldsman
- Written by: J. J. Abrams; Akiva Goldsman
- Production code: 3X5101
- Original air date: September 17, 2009

Guest appearances
- Luke Goss as Lloyd Parr; Ari Graynor as Rachel Dunham; Simone Kessell as Nurse; Meghan Markle as Amy Jessup; Tegan Moss as Rebecca Kibner; Michael Cerveris as The Observer; Michael Mitchell as George Reed; Stefan Arngrim as the Store Owner

Episode chronology
← Previous "There's More Than One of Everything"	Next → "Night of Desirable Objects"
- Fringe season 2

"A New Day in the Old Town" is the season premiere and first episode of the second season of the American science fiction drama television series Fringe, and the 21st episode overall. It was co-written by J. J. Abrams and Akiva Goldsman, with Goldsman directing. The episode followed the aftermath of Olivia's journey to the parallel universe in the last season's finale, while also introducing the idea of shapeshifters. It guest-starred actors Luke Goss, Ari Graynor, Meghan Markle, and Tegan Moss.

It first aired on Fox in the United States on September 17, 2009, to generally positive reviews. It was watched by an estimated 9.96 million viewers, and received a 2.43 ratings share among viewers 18–49.

== Plot ==
A mysterious man involved in a downtown Manhattan collision with a SUV flees the scene to a nearby apartment building. He enters the building and attacks a random man, hooking up equipment to the man's inner mouth, which allows him to adopt his external appearance and shapeshift. The crashed SUV is discovered to be Olivia's (Anna Torv), though she is not inside. Peter (Joshua Jackson) and Walter (John Noble) arrive and investigate the scene while being accosted by a new junior agent, Amy Jessup (Meghan Markle), who wonders what they do for the FBI. After Walter searches through the SUV, he shuts the door and Olivia suddenly ejects through the windshield. She is rushed to the hospital and declared brain dead. Peter and Broyles (Lance Reddick) drink at a bar together in sorrow, and Broyles reveals the Fringe Division is being shut down because of their failure to provide "usable results". Suspicious and curious of Fringe Division, Jessup begins a personal investigation into their past activities.

After talking to Rachel about her sister, Peter visits Olivia, who is scheduled to be taken off life support the following morning. However, Olivia suddenly wakes up, crying the Greek phrase Na einai kalytero anthropo apo ton patera tou. She does not remember getting injured, and incoherently tells Peter there is something they need to do, and their "lives may depend on it," but cannot remember who told her this, or why. Peter tries to enter the FBI building, but is denied until Jessup agrees to accompany him. She questions him about Fringe Division, and they begin investigating the driver who hit Olivia. When they arrive at his apartment, they discover what appears to be the driver's body, but he has been dead longer than when the accident took place.

The shapeshifted man makes contact with his group via typewriter (an allegedly nonexistent model of IBM Selectric, controlled by its image in a mirror), and is told his mission to prevent a "meeting" was unsuccessful, as Olivia is still alive. He is told to interrogate her, and then kill her. Meanwhile, Peter introduces Jessup to their lab at Harvard, and upon performing an autopsy on the man found in the apartment, they find three holes in the roof of his mouth. Walter shows them archived footage of one of his 1970s experiments of a drugged up girl who says she sees shapechanging soldiers from a parallel universe that can "look like any of us".

After being visited by her partner, Agent Charlie Francis (Kirk Acevedo) and given a gun, Olivia is unsuccessfully questioned by the shapeshifter, who has adopted the appearance of a female nurse. The nurse attempts to kill Olivia, but is shot and flees from Jessup. Peter, Charlie, and Jessup follow her into nearby tunnels, but become separated. Peter and Jessup hear gunshots and arrive to see that Charlie has apparently killed the shapeshifter. Peter returns to Olivia, and tells her the Greek phrase means "be a better person than your father," and was told to him every night by his mother.

After being told by a panel of Senators that Fringe Division is not worth the human or fiscal cost, Broyles is given the transformation device by Peter so Broyles can justify Fringe Division remaining active. In a separate scene, Agent Jessup is shown working at a computer, annotating an image of the creature from "The Transformation" with biblical verses, notably from the Book of Revelation. The final scene reveals that Charlie is actually the shapeshifter, who disposes of the real agent's body in a furnace beneath the hospital.

== Production ==
=== Background ===
In February 2009, Fox announced that if they renewed Fringe for a second season, they were moving the show's production from New York City to Vancouver, as the American city's tax breaks had expired. Fox officially renewed Fringe for a second season on May 4, 2009, and in July announced the new season would premiere on September 23, behind a new episode of Bones. Later reports indicated the episode would premiere on September 17.

=== Writing and filming ===
"Well, the first episode is sort of meant to kind of reset things, and for those who have never seen the show, offer a way in. It has the advantage of being almost better than the pilot. You never have to have seen the show to see the first episode and hopefully get sucked in. So what happens in the very beginning, this crazy sort of situation that she finds herself in is in a sense meant to be the premise for what this year is about. So what you're asking is really what happens over the course of the whole second season".

— Co-creator J. J. Abrams explaining the premiere in an interview

"A New Day in the Old Town" was co-written by consulting producer Akiva Goldsman and co-creator J. J. Abrams, with Goldsman also serving as director. In the DVD special features, actor Joshua Jackson explained the second season begins less than a day after the previous season's finale, "so the characters have only just barely had a chance to catch their breath from all the madness in the first season, and launch right back into the second one". Co-executive producer Jeff Pinkner considered beginning the second season directly after first season's final scene between Olivia and William Bell, but changed his mind because he thought it would be more interesting to show how Olivia's disappearance and reappearance affected the Fringe team, as well as the rest of the season. The scene between Olivia and Bell is consequently not shown until the season's fourth episode, "Momentum Deferred". The premiere began the "gun arc" storyline, which commenced with Olivia hurtling out of her SUV and becoming too weak to control her gun during her physical recovery, and ended with the killing of the shapeshifter posing as Charlie Francis in "Momentum Deferred".

The production team used new technology called a "breakaway windshield," as well as air cannons to eject the stuntwoman, Melissa Stubbs, from the vehicle. Instead of using wires, they used pneumatic rams to push her; cables and pulleys made it similar to a "catapult". The stuntwoman rehearsed with a helmet on, but took it off when the scene was ready to be shot. She wore a small backpad, a mouthguard, and some kneepads, and used her elbows to break the windshield upon being ejected. Stubbs commented that shooting the scene "all went as planned, and was very anticlimactic" because of the lack of problems. Anna Torv later called the stunt "one of the most humbling experiences in my life". She elaborated, "I don’t do any of the stuff that’s dangerous... Melissa Stubbs is the fantastic stuntwoman who did that [stunt]. They put a rocket for her in the back of the car, and they had that breakaway glass for the windshield. She has nothing on extra, except maybe elbow pads. Then they shoot her out of this rocket, through the windshield, and she rolls on the ground and lands on her mark. The guy goes in. She's OK. Everybody claps. Then I have to go in, lay in the same position, so they can get a close-up of my eyes opening. That was kind of humbling."

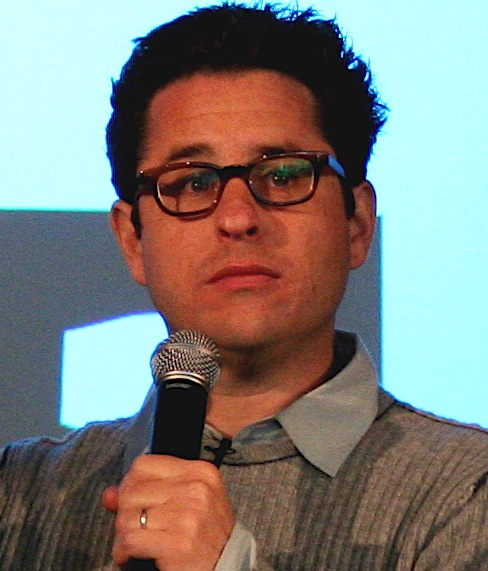
Executive producer J. J. Abrams co-wrote the premiere.

Prop master Rob Smith created the shapeshifter device and later regretted its design. He had joined the series during its second season, and had to quickly manufacture props while working under time and budget constraints. He explained, "[My] first episode we had to make the shape-shifter device, the thing that you put into your mouth and it transforms one person into another person. I was brand new here and I wasn’t happy with the way that turned out, and it came back in about 5 or 6 episodes. Every time it came back I was like, ‘Oh, I wish I could have that time over again to redo this one." He added, "A lot of the time, I [didn't] actually see [the prop] on set, so I watched the episode to see how everything comes together."

In June 2009, Fox put out a casting call for several new characters for the second season. One of these, Lloyd Parr, was described as a guest star in "his 30s to early 50s, an average guy. We need a strong character actor who can play hyper-competent. Like someone in a John Frankenheimer movie". Actor Luke Goss was cast in the role after episode writer Akiva Goldsman personally called his house and asked him to join the show. On June 24, 2009, TV Guide announced the casting of Meghan Markle as "an attractive, brash and quick-witted junior agent".

The producers considered screening the first part of the season premiere at Comic-Con in San Diego, but ultimately decided against it because they thought the scene "ends in such an exciting way that we were afraid to let it out". As a promotion, Fox did send out a DVD "screener" package of the premiere to certain journalists, which included a copy of The New York Times article shown in the first-season finale as well as a piece of paper with a list of typed phrases. The paper was a copy of the instructions one of the shapeshifters received on the typewriter, which included phrases like "Mission Accomplished" and "Target Terminated".

== Reception ==
=== Ratings ===
In May 2010, Fox announced Fringe would be moving from Tuesdays to Thursdays for the second season. Fox's entertainment president, Kevin Reilly, explained the move, "The door is more open on this night than it has been in a long time. Fringe is a real alternative to both [Grey's and CSI]." As the season premiere, "A New Day in the Old Town" was the first episode of the season to air in its new timeslot on Thursdays.

In its initial broadcast in the United States, the episode was watched by an estimated 7.817 million viewers and earned a 3.0/8 rating for viewers 18–49. After time shifted viewing was taken into account, Fringe increased to a 3.95 rating for the 18–49 demographic. It earned a 4.7/8 ratings share among all households, which caused it to be the series' worst rated episode yet. It was also more than 25 percent lower than its average audience from the first season. These lower ratings have been attributed to a lower-rated lead-in (Bones, instead of the previous season's American Idol and House), and tough competition from CBS's CSI: Crime Scene Investigation and NBC's The Office. The rest of the season's ratings would continue to stay lower than the previous season, leading many to question Fox's decision to move the show in the first place.

=== Reviews ===
Critical reviews of the episode were generally positive. Hilary Rothing from UGO Networks enjoyed the perceived parallels to The Wire and praised the further development of Anna Torv's character Olivia; "With tonight's premiere, the writing feels tighter, the pace is fast but not so much so that the story begins to trip over itself - and if that's any indication of how the rest of the season shapes up, then Fox will have my full attention every Thursday from 9-10pm". Noel Murray from The A.V. Club graded the episode an A−, writing that he enjoyed how the writers made the show "new-viewer-friendly without making existing fans too impatient". After receiving a DVD copy of the premiere in advance, IGN's Ramsey Isler rated the episode 9.0/10, explaining "Everything that made season one special is still here: Walter's still crazy and obsessed with food, Peter's still a smart-ass, and Olivia...well, there's a lot going on with Olivia, as usual". Isler thought newcomer Meghan Markle was "cute, and spunky, but... not quite a good fit here", and praised the cliffhanger as "surprising in a special way". MTV's Josh Wigler praised all the main actors' performances, and thought the episode gave the second season a "strong start".

"The second season of Fringe opens with an episode that is sure to please the ever-growing fanbase of this remarkable series. There are no signs of the dreaded "sophomore slump" here. This episode hits hard, and fast. From the very beginning you've got action, drama, gross out moments, and a heavy dose of "OMG did that really just happen!?" Is it a perfect episode? No. Is it entertaining? Hell yes!"

— IGN reviewer Ramsey Isler

TV Squad writer Jane Boursaw praised Olivia's entrance in the episode, calling it a "Nice set-up for the focal point of this episode... Really nice storyline to heave us face-first into the new season". She lauded the Charlie-shapeshifter plot twist, stating "The possibilities are endless with that storyline, and it'll be fun to see how it all plays out". SFScope columnist Sarah Stegall praised Joshua Jackson and Lance Reddick's performances, giving Jackson "top honors" as he "once again shows us the fangs behind that cherubic smile". Stegall also noted the allusions to The X-Files, which included an episode playing during the first shapeshifter's transformation, "Which is fine, as far as I'm concerned. If I can't have Mulder and Scully, I'll take Walter and Peter, and even Astrid and Charlie... I'm happy to see another show on TV that deals with the unknowable and the possibly fascinating, with an actual budget in hand. If this show started out as X-Files Light, it's developing some serious weight now."

Writing for the Los Angeles Times, critic Andrew Hanson heralded the return of the series, declaring "Fringe comes crashing headlong back onto television. That's not just a metaphor. Before we even fade in we have two cars smashing into each other. What a way to return: an accident in which one driver is nowhere to be found and the other flees into a nearby apartment, smooches his face and then uses a strange device to rearrange his appearance. That's my good old Fringe." The Futon Critic rated "A New Day in the Old Town" the sixteenth best television episode of 2010, while website blogger io9 listed it as one of the "crucial" episodes new viewers must watch to get into the show.

=== Awards and nominations ===
Writers J. J. Abrams and Akiva Goldsman submitted "A New Day in the Old Town" for consideration in the Outstanding Writing for a Drama Series category at the 62nd Primetime Emmy Awards. They did not receive a nomination.
