= Open Salon =

- Categories: Politics, social issues, popular culture
- First issue: April 17, 2008
- Company: Salon Media Group, Inc.
- Country: United States
- Language: English
- Website: opensalon.com

Open Salon was a hybrid blogging platform and social network site started by the Salon Media Group, Inc. According to Salon Editor-in-Chief Joan Walsh "Open Salon gets rid of traditional gatekeepers, and makes our smart, creative audience full partners in Salon's publishing future." After registering, users can start blogging immediately as well as rating and commenting on other posts. The Open Salon home page functions as a real-time magazine cover and is updated throughout the day. The best Open Salon content was featured on the cover of Salon.com.

On May 29, 2009, Open Chats debuted--short, 5-minute interviews with OS contributors. Saturn Smith appeared in the first feature.

Open Salon articles were frequently featured on the front page of Salon in the first two years of Open Salon's operation, but eventually disappeared. In December 2012, the Open Salon site appeared to have fallen into disrepair as a result of spam accounts overloading the system and many Open Salon bloggers moved on to the website Our Salon.

On March 9, 2015, Salon Media Group, Inc. announced it would be closing Open Salon after six years of hosting a community of writers and bloggers. Participants were notified and given two weeks to view their content before permanent closing of the site, which took place on March 31, 2015.

== Honors ==
Open Salon was a finalist in the 2009 National Magazine Awards under the interactive feature-- a category that recognizes an outstanding feature or section of a website that uses multimedia technology, tools, community platforms or other interactive formats to deliver or share content such as news, information and entertainment, rather than practical instruction or advice.
