= Making Angels =

- Fringe episode
- The alternate Astrid Farnsworth meets her counterpart, who comes to visit her after the death of her father.
- Episode no.: Season 4 Episode 11
- Directed by: Charles Beeson
- Written by: Akiva Goldsman; J. H. Wyman; Jeff Pinkner
- Production code: 3X7011
- Original air date: February 3, 2012

Guest appearances
- Chin Han as Neil Chung; G. Michael Gray as Jared Colin; Adrian Hough as Professor; Blu Mankuma as Stephen Farnsworth

Episode chronology
| ← Previous "Forced Perspective" | Next → "Welcome to Westfield" |
- Fringe season 4

"Making Angels" is the eleventh episode of the fourth season of the Fox science-fiction drama television series Fringe, and the series' 76th episode overall. The alternate Agent Farnsworth grants herself permission to cross over to the prime universe in order to visit Astrid and learn about her past after her father's death. In the investigation, a former MIT professor uses his talents, along with borrowed technology, to intercede in the lives of those destined for a life of suffering. Meanwhile, the Observers monitor the entire affair and learn of the failed intervention of one of their own.

The episode was co-written by Akiva Goldsman, J.H. Wyman, and Jeff Pinkner. Charles Beeson directed the hour. It received generally positive reviews, with the performance of Jasika Nicole, depiction of autism from the alternate incarnation of the character, which Nicole based on her sister, the development of Astrid which was considered long over-due and the interactions between Walter and Fauxlivia.

== Plot ==
The parallel universe's Astrid Farnsworth (Jasika Nicole) recently had her father die; as she has Asperger syndrome, she concludes the only person she can talk to is herself, and discreetly crosses over through the Machine Room bridge to meet with the prime universe's version of Astrid (Nicole). After a bit of initial surprise and discovery, the parallel version of Astrid explains that her father was aloof and distant to her special needs, and the prime Astrid admits the same, but implies she found a way to deal with them. When parallel Astrid's disappearance is discovered in the parallel universe, Colonel Broyles (Lance Reddick) sends Fauxlivia (Anna Torv) across to escort her back. When she arrives, Walter (John Noble) is initially bitter about her arrival, recalling her deceitful tactics she used to earn his trust when she was sent to take the prime Olivia's (Torv) place, but he soon warms up to her, and they share a number of questionably pleasant memories during that time.

Meanwhile, the prime universe's Fringe team learns of the death of a man who had just learned that he only had a short time to live due to cancer; his death was not natural, however, instead caused by a toxic aerosol spray that leaves him with bloody tears, giving him the appearance of the "Tears of Ra". Walter identifies the poison as something that could not have been developed by technology in either universe. They are alerted to another man, Jared (G. Michael Grey), who had just survived a car accident that left him paraplegic. Jared explains about a man that claimed he could see past, present, and future, and wanted to save Jared from suffering as a paraplegic by killing him before the accident; instead Jared ran, scared, into the accident himself. With information from Jared and help from the parallel version of Astrid, they recognize their man as a TSA agent at the airport who had cleared all his victims prior. When Peter and Olivia approach him, he evades capture.

Olivia and Peter (Joshua Jackson) learn their murderer is Neil (Chin Han), a former professor from MIT. A colleague there explains that, after spending a period of time at his lake house, Neil became fascinated by a series of high-level equations, ignoring work duties to study them and eventually abandoning his position. The two become concerned when they learn the lake house was on Reiden Lake, where, in this timeline, Walter had unsuccessfully tried to bring the parallel universe's version of Peter back over, and where Peter had reappeared within this timeline. At the lake house, they learn that Neil survived a car accident as a child that took his father and brother. Realizing Neil's mother is still alive, the two descend on her home, and find Neil there. Neil explains to his mother that, shortly after the accident, he had overheard her claiming that God took the wrong son, and has been trying to act as a savior to prove her wrong. As the Fringe team bursts into the home, Neil recounts that angels don't belong on earth, and fires a gunshot towards Olivia, upon which she returns fire and kills him. As the scene is cleared up, Olivia realizes that Neil had purposely missed her to get her to kill him, since he would not have become an angel if he had taken his own life.

The parallel versions of Astrid and Olivia soon return to their universe after warm goodbyes; the prime universe's Astrid is shown returning home into the welcoming arms of her father (Blu Mankuma), despite what she had told her doppelganger. At Neil's mother's home, two Observers, including December, locate Neil's safe and find a glowing blue tube, containing the aerosol formula. They recognize the tube as belonging to September, apparently lost when he had unsuccessfully tried to save Peter at Reiden Lake in 1985. December learns that Peter has reappeared in this timeline.

== Production ==
"It would be easy for the writers to say, oh there’s an Astrid episode, she solves a case and she’s in it a lot. But it’s not that simple, it’s a really lovely story about the Astrids meeting each other."

— Actress Jasika Nicole on "Making Angels"

"Making Angels" was co-written by co-showrunners Jeff Pinkner, J.H. Wyman, and consulting producer Akiva Goldsman. Supernatural veteran Charles Beeson directed the installment, his fourth Fringe directing credit (his other episodes being "Jacksonville", "The Firefly", and "Stowaway").

== Reception ==
=== Ratings ===
"Making Angels" was first broadcast on February 3, 2012, in the United States on Fox. An estimated 3.20 million viewers watched the episode, marking a slight decrease from the previous episode, but still remained one of the most viewed episodes of the season.

=== Reviews ===
The episode received generally positive reviews, with many praising Nicole's performance and the focus on Astrid's character, which was deemed long overdue. Noel Murray of The A.V. Club gave "Making Angels" a grade of "A-," though he felt it "suffered in comparison" to the season three episode "The Plateau." Murray particularly praised Nicole's portrayal of the alternate Astrid and her depiction of Alternate Astrid, dubbed "Austrid"'s mannerisms, but he was "mildly dismayed" that the storyline concluded with the alternate Astrid wondering if her father loved her, as experiencing love was a common trope in stories with autistic characters. He wondered how some of the events mentioned fit into the larger story arc, but found that the episode "offers its own refutation for those who get frustrated trying to figure out what's what." SFX reviewer Richard Edwards awarded the episode four and a half out of five stars, calling it "a cracker of an episode." He was positive toward the character-driven developments of Astrid and Walter, and although the concept of seeing the future had been used recently, he found the case of the week to still be interesting.

Writing for The Los Angeles Times, Andrew Hanson stated that the episode "practically pandered to everything I love this week," but felt that it did not quite work because Astrid and Neil's stories were disconnected although "enthralling." He preferred the Astrid story, writing that although Neil's story "started out strong," it faltered by the end. Jeff Jensen of Entertainment Weekly praised the drama and described the race to find Neil as "compelling." He also enjoyed the impact that the other Astrid and Fauxlivia made on the prime universe characters.

In a 2013 list, Den of Geek ranked the episode as the sixth best episode of the entire series, highlighting its use of Astrid and Jasika Nicole's performance as "note-perfect."
