= Welcome to Westfield =

- Fringe episode
- Episode no.: Season 4 Episode 12
- Directed by: David Straiton
- Written by: J. R. Orci; Graham Roland
- Production code: 3X7012
- Original air date: February 10, 2012

Guest appearance
- Tim Kelleher as Cliff Hayes

Episode chronology
| ← Previous "Making Angels" | Next → "A Better Human Being" |
- Fringe season 4

"Welcome to Westfield" is the twelfth episode of the fourth season of the Fox science-fiction drama television series Fringe, and the series' 77th episode overall.

The episode was written by J. R. Orci and Graham Roland, while being directed by David Straiton.

== Plot ==
Peter Bishop (Joshua Jackson) has been trying to understand and use the Machine to return to his original timeline, with Walter (John Noble) having become more open and willing to explore the nature and mechanics of the device. Olivia (Anna Torv) is curious about the state of her relationship with Peter in his original timeline and tries to learn more from Peter.

Several drivers find their cars malfunctioning along a stretch of highway in Vermont, followed shortly by a crash of an airliner nearby. The Fringe team is called to investigate, Walter coming along for the first time in years. Walter identifies that the cars and plane were influenced by a strong electromagnetic field. Olivia, Peter and Walter travel to a nearby small town, Westfield, to gather evidence. While stopping at a diner for a bite to eat, the proprietor, acting delusionally, turns on the group and they are forced to kill him. They find other bodies that, like the dead cook, exhibit double irises or a second set of teeth. They free a survivor, Cliff (Tim Kelleher), from the back room. As Walter tends to Cliff's wounds Olivia and Peter realize the town is practically deserted and communication with the outside impossible. They find themselves unable to leave the town when they try to drive Cliff to a hospital: leaving on the main road brings them right back into the town.

As Cliff recovers he explains that three days ago the population started suffering from a delusional outbreak, acting as if they had lived a second life and killing friends and loved ones as if they didn't know them. They regroup with survivors at the local high school where Walter takes blood samples to try to identify the cause. A survivor kills herself after coming down with symptoms of the malaise and Walter realizes that those affected have twice the normal count of human DNA and have a higher rate of mitosis which is creating duplicate body organs. Walter concludes that the infected have somehow merged with their doppelgangers from the parallel universe, giving them this novel biology and a new set of memories; the few who remain unaffected, like Cliff, likely did not have a doppelganger in the parallel universe's version of Westfield. Due to the inability to leave town, Walter surmises that someone has merged the two realities into a single location, an experiment that he and William Bell had performed on a much smaller scale years ago when studying the parallel universe. Olivia, who had earlier felt the onset of a second set of memories and other delusional effects that Cliff described, is relieved to hear from Walter that her biology is normal.

Suddenly, the town is struck by seismic effects, and from the school's roof, the Fringe team and the survivors witness trees and buildings shimmer out of existence. Walter reveals this as the after-effect of the universes being merged, the collapse and destruction of both merged masses. He and Peter quickly rationalize that the center of the merged town would act like the eye of a storm, and locate this point, a bicycle shop. The survivors race ahead of the collapsing field and make it to the store in time. After the collapse, all of Westfield has vanished, but for a few buildings around the bicycle shop, leaving barren wasteland for miles. The remainder of Fringe division is able to reach the survivors and help them; Olivia learns that they found several strange devices equipped with amphilicite planted around the perimeter of Westfield and believes them to have been set by David Robert Jones for some nefarious purpose.

On his way home, Peter goes to visit Olivia. She has ordered out for them and greets him with a kiss, things that only the Olivia from the primary timeline would have done.

== Production ==
"It's a fantastic episode, really mind-bending in the best FRINGE-ian kind of way. It's going to answer a lot of mythological questions. It's going to answer one very large mythological question, which we believe is of paramount importance, the answer to that question. It's a big one as far as stakes are concerned."

— Co-showrunner J. H. Wyman on "Welcome to Westfield"

"Welcome to Westfield" was co-written by co-producer Graham Roland and consulting producer J. R. Orci. House M.D. veteran David Straiton directed the installment, his third credit on the series (his other two being, "Amber 31422" and "Peter").

In a June 2012 interview with Entertainment Weekly, actor John Noble called the episode one of his favorites of the series because "it was the first time that really the old team had got back together again — Walter and Olivia (Anna Torv) and Peter (Joshua Jackson). It was a very interesting story for all sorts of reasons."

== Cultural references ==
At one point, Walter compares the town of Westfield to the eponymous town in the musical Brigadoon. Reviewers noted that the episode appeared to borrow several elements of other science-fiction and drama shows, including The Twilight Zone, Close Encounters of the Third Kind, The X-Files, The Prisoner and The Walking Dead. Jeff Jensen of Entertainment Weekly suggested that the use of "rhubarb pie" was an allusion to the industry term "rhubarb" used to describe the shocked murmuring of a crowd, and used here to mimic the anticipated reaction of the show's watchers at the various reveals.

== Reception ==
=== Ratings ===
The episode was watched by an estimated 3.05 million viewers. It earned 1.1 ratings share in adults 18-49, down a tenth from the previous episode, "Making Angels". Fringe finished fourth in the hour, behind CBS' CSI: NY, NBC's Grimm, and ABC's What Would You Do?.

=== Reviews ===
Jeff Jensen of Entertainment Weekly named "Welcome to Westfield" the sixth best episode of the series, calling it "the standout installment of Fringe's admirably ambitious but ultimately frustrating Rebootlandia fourth season, [which] felt like old school Fringe, and more, evocative of high-grade Twilight Zone, The X-Files, and The Walking Dead."
