= Charles Parnell (actor) =

American actor

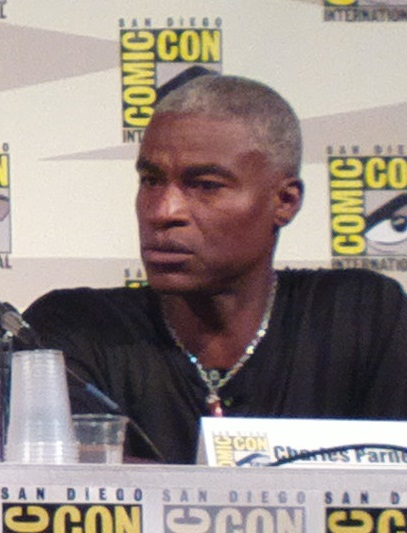
- Parnell at the 2014 San Diego Comic-Con
- Born: Chicago, Illinois, U.S.
- Occupation: Actor
- Years active: 1999–present

Charles Parnell is an American actor. He is best known for the role of Rear Admiral Solomon "Warlock" Bates in the film Top Gun: Maverick (2022). He was the second actor to portray Police Chief Derek Frye on All My Children (2004–2008).

== Early life ==
Parnell was born and raised in the Hyde Park neighborhood of Chicago, Illinois. He attended high school at the Kenwood Academy, and trained as an actor at the Piven Theatre Workshop in nearby Evanston. He relocated to New York in 1994 before eventually settling in Los Angeles.

== Career ==
Before taking the role of Derek Frye, Parnell played Achilles in Iphigeneia at Aulis, a play by Euripides translated and adapted by Kenneth Cavander at the Yale Repertory Theater in New Haven, Connecticut.

Parnell took over the role of Frye on All My Children, previously played by actor William Christian. He joined the cast of the show on September 8, 2005, and made his final appearance on September 24, 2007. He voices Jefferson Twilight on Cartoon Network's The Venture Bros..

Other appearances include the role of Master Chief Russell "Russ" Jeter on the TNT show The Last Ship from 2014 to 2018, Mission: Impossible – Dead Reckoning Part One (2023), its sequel Mission: Impossible – The Final Reckoning (2025), and The Killer (2023).

== Filmography ==
=== Film ===
Key
| † | Denotes works that have not yet been released |

| Year | Title | Role | Notes |
|---|---|---|---|
| 2004 | Mind the Gap | John McCabe | |
| 2006 | Everyone's Hero | Additional Voices | |
| 2007 | The Education of Charlie Banks | Asst. DA Worsheck | |
| 2008 | Diminished Capacity | Merkel Guard #2 | |
| 2009 | Mississippi Damned | Willie Roy | |
| 2011 | Pariah | Arthur | |
| 2014 | Transformers: Age of Extinction | CIA Director | |
| 2018 | A Million Little Pieces | Miles Davis | |
| 2022 | Top Gun: Maverick | Rear Admiral Solomon "Warlock" Bates | |
| 2022 | Spiderhead | Knowles | |
| 2023 | Mission: Impossible – Dead Reckoning Part One | NRO Richards | |
| 2023 | The Venture Bros.: Radiant Is the Blood of the Baboon Heart | Jefferson Twilight (voice) | |
| 2023 | The Killer | Hodges | |
| 2025 | Mission: Impossible – The Final Reckoning | NRO Richards | |
| 2027 | The Conjuring: First Communion † | TBA | Post-production |

=== Television ===
| Year | Title | Role | Notes |
|---|---|---|---|
| 1999 | Sex and the City | Business Guy | Episode: "Old Dogs, New Dicks" |
| 2003 | Hack | Officer | Episode: "A Dangerous Game" |
| 2004–2022 | Law & Order | Various | 3 episodes |
| 2004–2018 | The Venture Bros. | Jefferson Twilight, Mister 1, Mandalay (voices) | 14 episodes |
| 2005 | Without a Trace | Nuru | Episode: "Showdown" |
| 2005–2008 | All My Children | Derek Frye | 79 episodes |
| 2008 | CSI: Miami | FBI Agent Jacobs | Episode: "Gone Baby Gone" |
| 2008 | Crash | Sean Adams | 4 episodes |
| 2008 | Bones | Captain Blake | Episode: "The Passenger in the Oven" |
| 2009 | 90210 | Franklin Whitley | Episode: "Hello, Goodbye, Amen" |
| 2009 | Lie to Me | Major Harris | Episode: "Moral Waiver" |
| 2009 | NCIS | Marine Colonel Dick Jestern | Episode: "Reunion" |
| 2009 | CSI: Miami | Gavin Webb | Episode: "Bad Seed" |
| 2010 | The Forgotten | Man | Episode: "Designer Jane" |
| 2010 | The Forgotten | Dan Freeman | Episode: "Living Doe" |
| 2011 | Fringe | Dr. James Falcon | Episode: "Reciprocity" |
| 2012–2016 | North Woods Law | Narrator | 75 episodes |
| 2013 | Longmire | Agent Stanley | Episode: "Unquiet Mind' |
| 2014 | Constantine | Nommo | Episode: "A Feast of Friends" |
| 2014–2018 | The Last Ship | CMDCM Russ Jeter, USN | 46 episodes |
| 2016 | Better Things | Ned | Episode: "Duke's Chorus" |
| 2019–2020 | Briarpatch | Cyrus | 7 episodes |
| 2022 | Grand Crew | Franklin | Episode: "Wine & Pie" |
| 2022 | Kindred | Alan | 3 episodes |
| 2023 | The Mandalorian | Survivor Captain | 2 episodes |
| 2023 | Barry | District Attorney Buckner | Recurring (Season 4) |
| 2025 | Butterfly | Senator Dawson | 5 episodes |
| 2026 | Universal Basic Guys | Brooks Coleman (voice) | Episode: "That Dog in You" |

=== Video games ===
| Year | Title | Role |
|---|---|---|
| 2005 | The Warriors | Masai |
| 2007 | Manhunt 2 | The Legion |
| 2008 | Grand Theft Auto IV | The Crowd of Liberty City |
| 2013 | Grand Theft Auto V | The Local Population |
| 2014 | Call of Duty: Advanced Warfare | Additional Voices |
| 2014 | The Crew | Harry |
| 2017 | Mass Effect: Andromeda | August Bradley |
| 2020 | Avengers | Nick Fury, Senator |
| 2025 | Battlefield 6 | Rear Admiral Solomon "Warlock" Bates |

== Awards and nominations ==
| Year | Association | Category | Project | Result | Ref. |
|---|---|---|---|---|---|
| 2012 | NAACP Image Awards | Outstanding Supporting Actor in a Motion Picture | Pariah | Nominated | |
| 2024 | Screen Actors Guild Awards | Outstanding Performance by an Ensemble in a Comedy Series | Barry | Nominated | |
