= Lone Star Law =

- Genre: Reality
- Narrated by: Mark Rider
- Country of origin: United States
- Original language: English
- No. of seasons: 11
- No. of episodes: 76

Production
- Production company: Engel Entertainment

Original release
- Network: Animal Planet
- Release: June 2, 2016 – October 23, 2022

Lone Star Law is an American reality television series that debuted on June 2, 2016, on Animal Planet.

Set in Texas and similar to its network sister show North Woods Law, the show follows numerous game wardens of the Texas Parks and Wildlife Department from various regions of the Lone Star State.

The intro, "A Texas Game Warden's Job", is spoken by Warden Randolph McGee.

== Cast ==
- Chris Fried
- Mike Boone
- Benny Richards
- Morgan Inman
- Jennifer Provaznik
- Justin Eddins
- Jake Scott
- Wei-Wei Startz (Formerly Lin)
- Nicole "Coley" Leonard
- Randolph McGee
- Hendrik "Hennie" Volschenk
- Ben Bailey
- Chelsea Bailey
- Lauren Iles
- Jake Noxon
- Mack Chambers
- Jamal Allen
- Austin Neal
- McKenzie Crow
- Sam Smith
- Brandon Rose
- Froylan Hernandez
- Ellis Powell
- Kegan Gould
- Austin Shoemaker
- Dustin Delgado
- Thomas Rinn
- Preston Whisenhunt
- Justin Solis
- Sean Reneau
- Gerry Amundson
- Todd Long
- Mallory Mitchell
- Dustyn Jansky
- Clint Caywood
- Allison "Alli" Hatten
- Elizabeth Guevera
- Trey Kram
- Josh Sako
- Zak Benge
- Ashton Gulczewski
- Angel Miller
- Hannah Scarbrough
- Derrick Lopez
- Matt Maloney
- Josh Bulger
- James Cummings
- Amelia Springer
- Matt Kiel
- Michael "Mike" Serbanic
- Michael "Mike" Hickerson
- Jon Balderas
- Kyle Nevins
- Steve Stapleton
- Jeremy Lindsey
- Zach Martin
- Raj Ataya
- Randy Stovall
- Colby Hensz
- Phillip Wood
- Shane Horrocks
- Wes Groth
- Carmen Rickel
- Kyle Hendley
- Hollis Gregory
- James Brown
- Cynde Aguilar
- Dayton Isaacs
- David Hopkins
- Dustin Dockery
- Austin Cryer
- Jake McMahen
- Daniel Roraback
- Shane Lewis
- Jody Sellars
- Trent Herchman & K9 Brooks
- Jeff Putnam
- Forrest Price
- Shane Holmes
- Mike Gonzalez
- Weston Burris
- Brad Clark
- Lerrin Williams
- Albert Flores
- Joann Garza-Mayberry
- Jimmy Lindsey
- Ira Zuniga
- Ryan Hunter
- Eric Cooper
- Matt Marshall
- Luis Sosa
- Daylan Damron
- Mike Foster
- Zach Temple
- James Adcock
- Patrick True
- Kathleen Stuman
- Bryan Newman
- Anthony King
- Matt Zitterich
- William "Bo" Hancock
- Arturo Salinas
- Aaron Sims
- Jayme DeSchaaf
- Gary Miller
- Drew Spencer
- Landon Cook
- Shawn Hervey
- Tommy Johnson
- Jason Jones
- Jeff Hill
- Bryan Callihan
- Adam Broll
- Stephen Boultinghouse
- Brandt Bernstein
- Gustavo Armas Jr
- Daron Blackerby
- Lance May
- Jason Bussey
- Dillon Eizember
- Jesse Garcia
- Chad Goertz
- Mark Bane
- Brandon Mosley
- Boyd Sanders
- Chris "Chip" Daigle
- Chris Wilson
- Mike Stephens
- Trent Marker
- Ryan McGinley
- Chad Jones
- Arthur McCall
- Jeff Powell
- James Barge
- Bill Rogers
- Eric Collins
- Santano Torres
- Jarret Barker
- Eric Minter
- Patrick True
- Bryan Reed
- Dan Waddell
- Brian Dulock
- Scott Jurk
- Theron Oatman
- Daniel Pope
- Stormy McCuistion
- Jerry Norris
- Logan Griffin
- Derek Spitzer
- Trey Shewmake
- Eddie Lehr
- John Thorne & K9 Justin
- Cody Buckaloo
- James Michael
- Christy Vales & K9 Ruger
- Leanne Winkerwerder
- Jarrod Bryant
- Kevin Frazier
- Sophie Hiatt
- Teri Potts
- Royce Ilse & K9 Rusty
- Daniel Kessler
- Travis Fountain
- Rolando Fuentes
- Brent Satsky
- John McFall
- Patricia Vannoy
- David Vannoy
- Ricky May
- Jim Yetter
- Beau Hester
- Sam Anderson
- Chris Amthor
- Cody Levy
- Justin Gallender
- Kyle Allison
- Ryan Svehla
- Vinicius Mathias
- Nathan Skeen
- Gregg Johnson
- Chad West
- Michael McCall
- Kevin Winters
- Stephen Satchfield
- David Benoit
- Taylor Garrison
- John Griffin
- Shane Bailey
- Shane Lewis
- Justin Jackson
- Ryan Hall
- Special Game Warden Hall
- Greg Williford
- Brent Isom
- Kryssie Thompson
- Robb Furlow
- David McMillon & K9 Jake
- Tyler Stoikes
- Shawna Poole

== Episodes ==
=== Series overview ===
Season	Episodes	Originally released	
Season	Episodes	First released	Last released
1	12	June 2, 2016	August 18, 2016
2	10	February 19, 2017	April 16, 2017
3	12	January 7, 2018	April 1, 2018
4	12	November 20, 2018	February 19, 2019
5	11	May 7, 2019	July 14, 2019
6	11	July 29, 2019	December 8, 2019
7	5	January 5, 2020	January 26, 2020
8	13	July 5, 2020	October 4, 2020
9	15	January 3, 2021	April 18, 2021
10	9	January 22, 2022	March 19, 2022
11	8	August 6, 2022	October 23, 2022

=== Season 1 (2016) ===
No. overall	No. in season	Title	Original release date
1	1	"Game On"	June 2, 2016
Game wardens respond to stray snapping turtle in resident's yard, conduct investigation into poaching (where suspect bragged about kill on Facebook), patrol shrimp boat for regulatory compliance, patrol coast for smuggling operations, patrol Rio Grande for gill nets (legal on Mexico side, illegal on Texas side), night-time patrol for poaching (arresting one person for suspected meth possession)
2	2	"Caught Red Handed"	June 9, 2016
Game wardens conduct three illegal wildlife sale sting operations (one sale was found to be legal), set decoy deer to catch poachers, patrol lake for intoxicated boaters, respond to pipeline leak spilling oil on coastline, patrol fishing boat charter and night-time jetty fishing for unlicensed/illegal fishing
3	3	"Gulf Recon"	June 16, 2016
4	4	"Calm Before the Storm"	June 23, 2016
5	5	"Mayday Mayday"	June 30, 2016
6	6	"Gator Bait"	July 7, 2016
7	7	"To Catch a Poacher"	July 14, 2016
8	8	"Gator vs. Dog"	July 21, 2016
9	9	"Caught on Camera"	July 28, 2016
10	10	"Out for Blood"	August 4, 2016
11	11	"Busted"	August 11, 2016
12	12	"Order on the Border"	August 18, 2016

=== Season 2 (2017) ===
No. overall	No. in season	Title	Original release date
13	1	"Gator vs. Game Warden"	February 19, 2017
14	2	"New Blood"	February 26, 2017
15	3	"The Eagle has Landed"	March 5, 2017
16	4	"Run and You're Done"	March 12, 2017
17	5	"Moving Target"	March 19, 2017
18	6	"Border Bust"	March 26, 2017
19	7	"Roadside Sting"	April 2, 2017
20	8	"Gator Showdown"	April 9, 2017
21	9	"Armed and Dangerous"	April 16, 2017
22	10	"Wild Encounters"	April 16, 2017

=== Season 3 (2018) ===
No. overall	No. in season	Title	Original release date
23	1	"Don't Mess With Texas"	January 7, 2018
24	2	"In The Nick of Time"	January 14, 2018
25	3	"Trespassers Beware"	January 21, 2018
26	4	"Thousand Year Flood"	January 28, 2018
27	5	"The Face of Danger"	February 11, 2018
28	6	"Danger at Dawn"	February 18, 2018
29	7	"Submerged"	February 18, 2018
30	8	"Chase on the Border"	March 4, 2018
31	9	"When Deer Attack"	March 11, 2018
32	10	"Poachers and Liars"	March 18, 2018
33	11	"Shock on the Bay"	March 25, 2018
34	12	"Poaching Rampage"	April 1, 2018

=== Season 4 (2018-19) ===
No. overall	No. in season	Title	Original release date
35	1	"Justice Served"	November 20, 2018
36	2	"Back Road Bait"	November 27, 2018
37	3	"Seeing Stars and Stripes"	December 4, 2018
38	4	"Crash Course"	December 11, 2018
39	5	"Wet and Wild"	December 18, 2018
40	6	"Deceived"	January 8, 2019
41	7	"Boiling Point"	January 15, 2019
42	8	"Fawn Stars"	January 22, 2019
43	9	"Poachers Beware"	January 29, 2019
44	10	"Red Flag"	February 5, 2019
45	11	"Wildlife Rescues"	February 12, 2019
46	12	"Best Chases"	February 19, 2019

=== Season 5 (2019) ===
No. overall	No. in season	Title	Original release date
47	1	"Saving the Herd"	May 7, 2019
48	2	"Stray Bullets"	May 14, 2019
49	3	"Back in the Wild"	May 21, 2019
50	4	"Bucks and Bows"	May 28, 2019
51	5	"Owl Gone Bad"	June 4, 2019
52	6	"Wildcat Garage"	June 11, 2019
53	7	"Panhandle Poachers"	June 16, 2019
54	8	"Crossing the Line"	June 23, 2019
55	9	"Hunting Hunters"	June 30, 2019
56	10	"Finding a Felon"	July 7, 2019
57	11	"Pelicans and Poachers"	July 14, 2019

=== Season 6 (2019) ===
No. overall	No. in season	Title	Original release date
58	1	"Small Town Troubles"	July 29, 2019
59	2	"In Hot Water"	October 6, 2019
60	3	"Trashed"	October 13, 2019
61	4	"Deadly Conduct"	October 20, 2019
62	5	"Calm After the Storm"	October 27, 2019
63	6	"Midnight Manhunt"	November 3, 2019
64	7	"Shrimp and Run"	November 10, 2019
65	8	"Rattled"	November 17, 2019
66	9	"Bullets and Lies"	November 24, 2019
67	10	"Drug Run River"	December 1, 2019
68	11	"Old Warrants Die Hard"	December 8, 2019

=== Season 7 (2020) ===
No. overall	No. in season	Title	Original release date
69	1	"Lying Dogs"	January 5, 2020
70	2	"In the Crosshairs"	January 5, 2020
71	3	"Bucks Collide"	January 12, 2020
72	4	"Sparks Flying"	January 19, 2020
73	5	"Liars and Trespassers"	January 26, 2020

=== Season 8 (2020) ===
No. overall	No. in season	Title	Original release date
Special
74	-	"Guardians of the Gulf"	July 5, 2020
Season
75	1	"Wild Call"	July 12, 2020
76	2	"Stag Poaching"	July 19, 2020
77	3	"Confronting the Captain"	July 26, 2020
78	4	"Family Lies"	August 2, 2020
79	5	"Thrill of the Hunt"	August 9, 2020
80	6	"Reckless Behavior"	August 16, 2020
81	7	"Anglers, Alcohol and Owls"	August 23, 2020
82	8	"Confessions of a Poacher"	August 30, 2020
83	9	"Caught By Surprise"	September 6, 2020
84	10	"Tempers Are Rising"	September 13, 2020
85	11	"Chasing a Dead Man"	September 20, 2020
86	12	"Suspicious Encounters"	September 27, 2020
87	13	"Passing the Torch"	October 4, 2020
Special
88	-	"Boundary Wars"	October 5, 2020
89	-	"Wake of Destruction"	January 3, 2021
