= Enemy of My Enemy =

- Fringe episode
- Episode no.: Season 4 Episode 9
- Directed by: Joe Chappelle
- Written by: Monica Owusu-Breen; Alison Schapker
- Production code: 3X7009
- Original air date: January 20, 2012

Guest appearances
- Orla Brady as Elizabeth Bishop; Jared Harris as David Robert Jones; Michelle Krusiec as Nadine Park

Episode chronology
| ← Previous "Back to Where You've Never Been" | Next → "Forced Perspective" |
- Fringe season 4

"Enemy of My Enemy" is the ninth episode of the fourth season of the Fox science-fiction drama television series Fringe, and the series' 74th episode overall.

The episode was co-written by Monica Owusu-Breen and Alison Schapker, while being directed by Joe Chappelle.

== Plot ==
Following from "Back to Where You've Never Been", the alternate universe's Olivia (Anna Torv) and Lincoln (Seth Gabel) track down David Robert Jones (Jared Harris) to a warehouse, unaware that Colonel Broyles (Lance Reddick) had alerted Jones to their arrival. Jones waits until Olivia and Lincoln arrive before destroying one of his beloved shapeshifters, warning that if he's willing to destroy someone he loves, they should fear what he would do to anyone else. He asks to be taken to Fringe headquarters.

There, Peter (Joshua Jackson) and the prime universe's Lincoln (Gabel), having been cleared to return to the prime universe, are present when Jones is escorted to an interrogation room. Peter recognizes Jones, whom Peter has killed in his original timeline, and offers to interrogate him; Peter is able to throw Jones off guard, revealing that he knows Jones had crossed over from the prime universe and that his scars showed he'd suffered injuries as a result of being teleported out of prison. Jones makes a demand for a hard drive, containing satellite tracking data, to be returned to him and to let him go or else his agents will launch terrorist attacks; this is demonstrated when one agent sets off a biochemical agent in a hospital ward, killing all inside.

They let Jones go after secretly fitting him with a tracking device. However, due to Broyles' interference, Jones is able to elude the tracking system, leaving the prime version of Lincoln suspicious of a mole within Fringe division. Peter and Astrid (Jasika Nicole) study the data from the hard drive, and identify that Jones appears to be looking in a nearby quarry for amphilicite, a mineral in appreciable quantities that when processed correctly can create a hole in the universes. Peter realizes too late that the maps are those of the prime universe; Jones has crossed back over with help of his shapeshifter agents there to access the quarry. Peter and Lincoln return to the prime universe to catch up to Jones, but arrive too late as Jones takes a load of the mineral back to the alternate universe. The two Fringe teams meet and agree they must work together to defeat Jones, even though they know that Jones has been ahead of them. Peter recognizes that he knows Jones from the alternate timeline and is a variable that Jones has not accounted for. Later, the viewer is shown that Jones is communicating with Nina Sharp (Blair Brown), who is preparing an unnamed woman for "Phase Two" of their plan.

Meanwhile, Walternate (John Noble) and his wife Elizabeth (Orla Brady) discuss helping Peter. Elizabeth crosses to the prime universe to meet with Walter (Noble) and to gain his help to assist Peter, which he has been reluctant to do, believing he has been given no sign of absolution for taking Peter from her. Elizabeth assures him that she had forgiven him long ago. Walter returns to Peter that evening and offers Peter his help to return home.

== Production ==
"Enemy of My Enemy" was co-written by co-executive producers Alison Schapker and Monica Owusu-Breen. Executive producer Joe Chappelle served as episode director.

== Reception ==
=== Ratings ===
This episode saw an increase in viewership from the lowest ratings of the series. "Enemy of My Enemy" was watched by an estimated 3.19 million viewers, while the previous two episodes (returning from a winter hiatus) were watched by 2.8 million viewers each.

=== Reviews ===
Zach Handlen of The A.V. Club graded the episode with a B+. He began his review by calling the season's Peter storyline a "bold move," but added that the decision had "turned off a lot of critics and fans, and it’s not hard to see why. One of the reasons we watch a television show (or get invested in any sort of long-form storytelling) is because it’s fun to care about fictional people... The fourth season of Fringe has, so far as we can tell, left nearly everyone we know behind." Despite this observation, Handlen clarified that "the fourth season has actually by and large worked for me," and that he believed "Enemy of My Enemy" to be a "fun, thrilling piece of work, with plenty of solid emotional scenes to help ground the action sequences." The reviewer also enjoyed seeing Harris' return, especially as it added a "non-Walternate villain [to] help keep the current story arc from" repeating past universe conflicts.
