= Immortality (Fringe) =

- Fringe episode
- Fringe Division investigates a man's death, caused by flesh-eating "skelter beetles" (seen in background)
- Episode no.: Season 3 Episode 13
- Directed by: Brad Anderson
- Written by: David Wilcox; Ethan Gross
- Production code: 3X6113
- Original air date: February 11, 2011

Guest appearances
- Seth Gabel as Lincoln Lee; Kirk Acevedo as Charlie Francis; Philip Winchester as Frank Stanton; Ryan McDonald as Brandon Fayette; Alon Abutbul as Dr. Armand Silva; Joan Chen as Reiko; Eric Keenleyside as Jerry Bissell; Julie McNiven as Mona Foster

Episode chronology
← Previous "Concentrate and Ask Again"	Next → "6B"
- Fringe season 3

"Immortality" is the 13th episode of the third season of the American science fiction drama television series Fringe, and the 56th episode overall. In the episode, the Fringe Division of the parallel universe investigates a series of deaths caused by flesh-eating "skelter beetles", unleashed by a mad scientist (Alon Abutbul). Abutbul, Seth Gabel, Kirk Acevedo, Philip Winchester, Ryan McDonald, and Joan Chen appeared as guest stars.

The episode was written by co-executive producer David Wilcox and story editor Ethan Gross, and was directed by filmmaker Brad Anderson. "Immortality" first aired in the United States on February 11, 2011 to an estimated 3.7 million viewers, a 12.5 percent decrease from the previous week. Time shifted viewing led to an addition of 64 percent to the week's original ratings, but lead actor Joshua Jackson still expressed concern for the show's future, urging fans to watch the series live on Fridays. Television critics viewed the episode positively, with one praising it for offering "a creepy case, a great villain, and a pertinent plot twist".

== Plot ==
In the parallel universe, Lincoln (Seth Gabel) has been promoted to head of the Fringe Division, while Fauxlivia (Anna Torv) welcomes back Frank (Philip Winchester), her boyfriend who has been working as part of the Centers for Disease Control to deal with an outbreak in North Texas for the last several weeks. The division is alerted to a case where a man has been killed, eaten from the inside by insects. They identify the insects as "skelter beetles", which is surprising as they had been assumed to have become extinct some ten years earlier along with sheep, the only host they can survive in. Frank is brought in to consult on the case at Lincoln's request, and later proposes marriage to Fauxlivia, who happily accepts.

A second case occurs a few days later, another man killed by the beetles, but they find the beetles to be larger and more mature. From the second victim's movements, they identify the likely culprit as Dr. Armand Silva (Alon Abutbul), a former scientist. Dr. Silva was working on a cure for avian flu using the skelter beetle, but his research was terminated with the extinction of the sheep. Fauxlivia and Frank postulate Dr. Silva may be trying to breed the beetles in humans, who share similar biological features with sheep.

Fauxlivia and Lincoln track Dr. Silva's location, an abandoned building, and separate. Dr. Silva locks Lincoln in a cold storage room, while Fauxlivia falls through a weakened floor and passes out. She is woken by Dr. Silva, but finds herself secured to a chair. Dr. Silva explains to Fauxlivia that he wants to see through the end of his research, needing only one more human host for a final gestation cycle to birth the queen beetle from which the beetle species, and his cure, can be sustained. Fauxlivia feels pains in her body when Dr. Silva implies the last cycle has begun, believing herself to be the host.

By then, Lincoln has broken out of the cold locker and called for backup. Frank rushes Fauxlivia to a hospital while Lincoln interrogates Dr. Silva. Dr. Silva reveals he was the last host, and implores Lincoln to remember his name as he extracts the live queen beetle from his body and dies. Meanwhile, Frank discovers Fauxlivia is pregnant; the adrenaline had induced morning sickness symptoms. At the hospital, the fetus is found to be six weeks old. Frank realizes he was away at that time, accuses Fauxlivia of sleeping with another man, and leaves her. Fauxlivia cries to herself, realizing her child's father is Peter (Joshua Jackson) from her time in the prime universe.

In a side plot, Walternate (John Noble) has recovered the portion of the doomsday machine that Fauxlivia has secured from the prime universe, and has discovered the formulation for Cortexiphan from his tests on Olivia, but refuses to allow it to be tested on children. When he hears of Fauxlivia's pregnancy with his grandchild, Walternate comforts her and offers his complete support for her, believing the child to be another way to bring Peter voluntarily back to the parallel universe.

== Production ==
"Immortality" was written by co-executive producer David Wilcox and story editor Ethan Gross, and was directed by frequent Fringe collaborator Brad Anderson. Around the time the episode aired, executive producer and showrunner J.H. Wyman said of Anderson, "If we come up with this great concept and say, 'That's going to be tricky to shoot,' we know he's going to transcend it because he just has that way of looking at film as a feature director where anything's possible." Wyman and fellow executive producer and showrunner Jeff Pinkner planned the Fauxlivia pregnancy storyline since they conceived her character; according to them, they departed from the typical television pregnancy trope by "Fringe-if[ying] it" and adding a science fiction element.

The episode's premise was based on an extinct type of beetle, which caused trouble for guest actor Kirk Acevedo, as he had a fear of bugs. Pinkner commented in an interview that Acevedo "has a primal fear of bugs and had to act with a bunch of live bugs and fake bugs, all of which equally terrified him. And we didn't know. But he was game and heroic despite. He conquered his fears, which was awesome". Upon discovering her character Fauxlivia would be pregnant, Wyman described Anna Torv's reaction, "She was up for it! All our cast has such a terrific attitude. They get as excited as we do. They really embrace the ideas. She's had a lot of challenges and she's met them with such aplomb. She's really terrific. She was happy!"

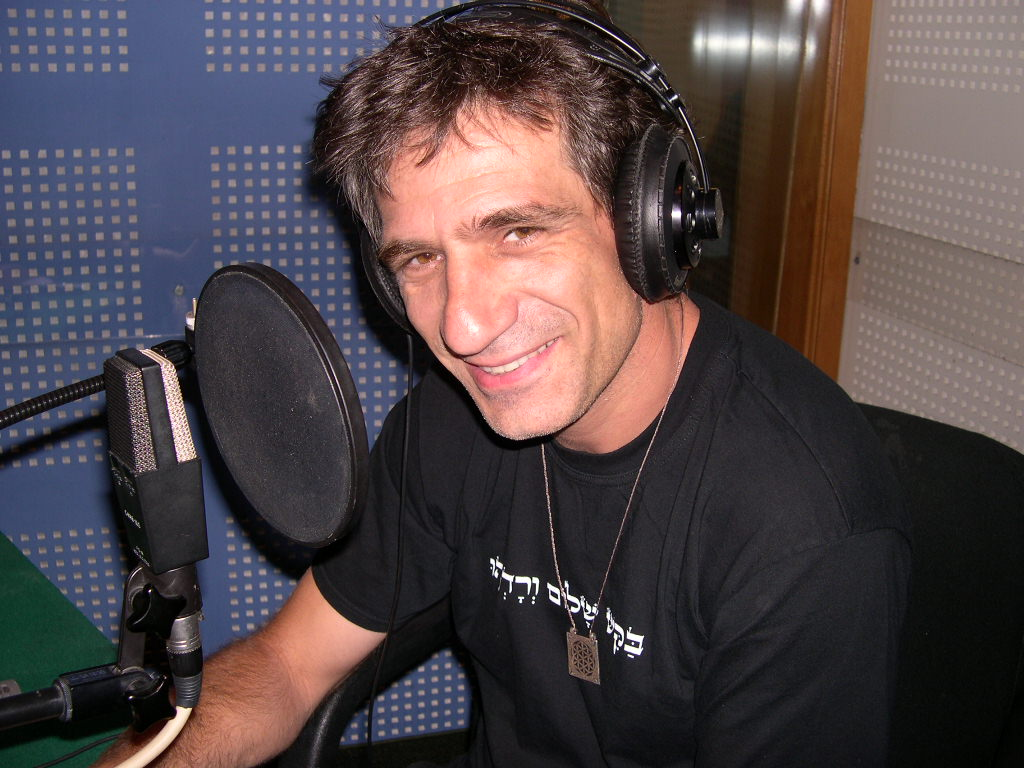
In "Immortality", Alon Aboutboul made his only guest appearance of the series.

In addition to Acevedo, other recurring guest actors included Seth Gabel as Lincoln Lee, Philip Winchester as Frank Stanton, and Ryan McDonald as Brandon Fayette. In his only guest-starring role for the series, Alon Aboutboul appeared as the episode's main villain, Dr. Armand Silva. Former Twin Peaks star Joan Chen made an appearance as Reiko, Walternate's lover.

After the episode broadcast, Joshua Jackson commented in an interview with Entertainment Weekly that "apparently I’m [Peter's] gonna be a dad. And it is like the most extreme long-distance relationship, which I am pretty good at as it turns out in real life. My baby mama is in another universe. I think he has to find out, but I don’t know exactly how we’re gonna work that out yet. As with other Fringe episodes, Fox released a science lesson plan in collaboration with Science Olympiad for grade school children, focusing on the science seen in "Immortality", with the intention of having "students learn about the influenza virus and how it spreads and impacts its host."

== Cultural references ==
Two allusions to the ABC show Twin Peaks were observed by journalists. The first was the presence of Joan Chen, who starred in the role of Reiko, Walternate's mistress, and had appeared on Twin Peaks as the femme fatale Josie Packard. The second allusion is made when the second victim orders "a piece of cherry pie" at a diner, alluding to the Twin Peaks lead character Dale Cooper's own fondness for this item. The insect Dr. Silva was trying to rescue from extinction was called a "skelter beetle", with the scientific name Mansohnium boogliosus. This is a reference to the Beatles song "Helter Skelter", cult leader Charles Manson, who was obsessed with the song, and Vincent Bugliosi, the district attorney who prosecuted Manson. The second victim was identified as having eaten at the Abbey Road Diner, a reference to the recording studio that the Beatles used. The episode featured the song "I Want You to Want Me" by American rock band Cheap Trick and a cover of "Road To Nowhere" by French band Nouvelle Vague.

== Reception ==
=== Ratings ===
"Immortality" was watched by about 3.7 million viewers, drawing a 1.4/4 ratings share on its initial broadcast, down 12.5 percent from the previous episode's viewership. During the first half hour, the episode placed second in its timeslot, but dropped to fourth for its second half. Its lead-in, Kitchen Nightmares, also dropped 12 percent, as did all other network shows for that night. Time shifting viewing added 57 percent to the episode's ratings for three days out, and 64 percent for a week following the first airing. This was the greatest DVR gain yet for the series in that timeslot. Despite this, Joshua Jackson urged fans to watch the series live in an interview with Entertainment Weekly a week after "Immortality" aired. He explained "I'm a positive person in general, but we really need our Fringe fans to tune in and watch us on Fridays. We did good when we first moved, but last week we did not have a good week, ratings wise. It is going to take the people that like the show to watch the show and start the campaign and show their support if they want to see us stick around for another season."

=== Reviews ===
"Immortality" generally received positive reviews from television critics. Noel Murray of The A.V. Club graded the episode an A−, explaining that "after last week’s semi-misfire, it was reassuring to see Fringe back in good form this week, with a creepy case, a great villain, and a pertinent plot twist". Andrew Hanson from the Los Angeles Times' enjoyed the "fun" scenes in the parallel universe, and stated he would not mind watching an entire show about their Fringe Division. IGN's Ramsey Isler called the victims' method of death in "Immortality" "one of the nastiest in recent memory," and rated the episode 8.5/10. He concluded that he was "quite surprised by this episode. The storyline with the Dr. Silva [sic] and his beetles didn't hold my interest at all, but everything else in this installment was fascinating material that expanded the mythos of the series far more than I could have imagined." Den of Geek's Billy Grifter wrote, "What this show is now quite good at is lulling us into a false sense of security, before pulling away the rug rather smartly. If you follow the show, like me, you probably got a slightly déjà vu feeling to the plot, as it rode the previously saddle worn concept of a scientist who has lost the perspective to realise that he's killing people for science."

SFScope contributor Sarah Stegall liked Frank's final conversation concerning Fauxlivia's pregnancy, praising the plot twist's potential to "make for some interesting drama, perhaps even allowing the show to get past the inevitable mawkishness of most pregnancy stories." However, there was some negative fan feedback concerning the pregnancy storyline. In reaction to this, Jeff Pinkner commented, "Our interpretation of it is that people desperately want to see Olivia and Peter together. And that Fauxlivia having a baby makes Olivia’s life that much harder and people are angry because of that. Anything that makes Olivia’s life harder, people seem to be angry at. Olivia is a hero, she will conquer all. She'll deal." After "Immortality" aired, Joshua Jackson expressed sympathy for fans of the Olivia-Peter relationship, commenting that they "have been taken for quite a ride. He [Peter] wants to be with her [Olivia], and in his mind it was her. But in her mind, he should have been able to tell the difference."
