= American Stuffers =

- Joseph, Dixie, Daniel Ross and Fred (from left)
- Starring: Daniel Ross
- Country of origin: United States
- No. of seasons: 1
- No. of episodes: 8 (3 unaired)

Production
- Executive producers: Jeff Collins; Mick Kaczorowski
- Production company: Collins Avenue Entertainment

Original release
- Network: Animal Planet
- Release: January 5 – February 2, 2012

American Stuffers is an American reality documentary on Animal Planet. The series debuted on January 1, 2012, and follows taxidermist Daniel Ross and his employees at his company, Xtreme Taxidermy, as they live preserve the pets of the customers that come into the store. The series was cancelled after five episodes due to low ratings.

== Episodes ==
No.	Title	Original release date	U.S. viewers (millions)
1	"Keep Your Dead Animals Out of My Kitchen"	January 5, 2012	0.58
2	"The Woman with a Pet Raccoon?"	January 12, 2012	0.57
3	"How to Stuff a Chihuahua"	January 19, 2012	0.53
4	"The Yorkie a Hawk Tried to Carry Away"	January 26, 2012	0.47
5	"The Dog Named Precious"	February 2, 2012	0.55
6	"The Cat Without a Nose"	N/A	N/A
7	"The Hairless Dog"	N/A	N/A
8	"A Tornado Hits Romance"	N/A	N/A

== Reception ==
The program has received mixed reviews. The New York Times called it possibly "The most wholesome reality show on television right now," noting "it succeeds in being as entertaining as less-wholesome shows is a testament to the wry good humor and general niceness of its subjects". The A.V. Club was less positive, with the reviewer saying that the show "will probably be a goldmine for [clip show program] The Soup" while noting that the program "was touching in ways I didn’t expect as well as disturbing in ways I didn’t expect". A reviewer from the Arkansas Times was negative, saying that pet lovers will find that the show "is going to make you want to scream and jump backwards through a plate glass window", and that the reviewer "couldn't stop chuckling at some of the seemingly-heartwarming situations captured in the clips I saw".
