= Reciprocity (Fringe) =

- Fringe episode
- The assembled machine under study by Massive Dynamic and Fringe Division scientists
- Episode no.: Season 3 Episode 11
- Directed by: Jeannot Szwarc
- Written by: Josh Singer
- Production code: 3X6111
- Original air date: January 28, 2011

Guest appearances
- Ryan McDonald as Brandon Fayette; Charles Parnell as Dr. James Falcon; Sean Campbell as Zach Alpert; Noah Beggs as Lt. Pike; Hector Johnson as PFC Tomforde; Brett Delaney as Agent Goldin; Paula Giroday as Agent Ruiz

Episode chronology
← Previous "The Firefly"	Next → "Concentrate and Ask Again"
- Fringe season 3

"Reciprocity" is the eleventh episode of the third season of the American science fiction drama television series Fringe, and the 54th episode overall. In the episode, the Fringe division follows a chain of shapeshifter murders as the assembly of the doomsday device nears completion. Ryan McDonald and Charles Parnell guest starred.

Co-executive producer Josh Singer wrote "Reciprocity", his seventh such credit for the series. For his third Fringe directional credit, Jeannot Szwarc served as the director. The episode first aired in the United States on January 28, 2011 to an estimated 4.57 million viewers, making it the highest rated program of the night. Television critics generally viewed the episode positively, with a number praising the revelation of the shapeshifter killer's identity.

== Plot ==
The Fringe division visits a secured Massive Dynamic facility where the prime universe's version of the doomsday device, believed to be an artifact of the "First People", has been assembled. The company is trying to use the books about the First People, including those that William Bell had sought, that they have collected to understand the workings of the device. They are aware that before her departure, Fauxlivia (Anna Torv)—Olivia's parallel universe doppelgänger—stole one component of the unit, possibly its power source as they cannot find any other way to engage the device. However, as Peter (Joshua Jackson) nears it, the device reacts, moving into a new configuration and sending out electromagnetic pulses, while Peter suddenly has a nosebleed. Peter returns with Olivia (Torv) and Walter (John Noble) to Massive Dynamic to undergo some tests to see if he was the cause for the device's activation. Meanwhile, Broyles (Lance Reddick) asks Astrid (Jasika Nicole) to discreetly review the files pulled from Fauxlivia's computer for any hidden messages, not wishing to have Olivia or Peter be forced to learn of what Fauxlivia wrote about them.

The next day, the corpse of a shapeshifter is found, shot in the head with its data disc—encoded information regarding its mission—missing. When the identity connects it to one of the employees at the facility where the Fringe mainframe is housed, Broyles suspects a mole seeking to wipe out Fauxlivia's data, and orders a mainframe lockdown, while verifying the humanity of key people in the FBI and Massive Dynamic. Astrid identifies several other potential candidates, including a doctor from Massive Dynamic who had already left. By the time Fringe division reaches his home, they find the man, a shapeshifter, already dead.

Olivia returns to the lab and convinces Astrid to let her review Fauxlivia's notes, believing that should she think like her doppelgänger, she will see something they missed. Eventually, she comes to identify a cipher based on her childhood name, Olive, that identifies Newton and the other slain shapeshifters, and one that has yet to be killed. Fringe begins to descend on his residence.

Meanwhile, Walter, having thought Peter had returned to Massive Dynamic for tests, learns he is not there. Walter enters his room, finding printed pages of Fauxlivia's notes including the circled names of the shapeshifters, those that Olivia just identified. Walter arrives at the home of the final shapeshifter just as Peter finishes killing him. Peter tries to justify his actions as no longer wanting to be just reactive to the situation and to learn of the shapeshifters' goal. Peter and Walter depart before the Fringe team arrives; Walter postulates that the device, when it activated, may have "weaponized" Peter to take these steps and fears what else Peter may attempt to do.

== Production ==
Co-executive producer Josh Singer was responsible for writing "Reciprocity", his seventh such credit for the series. The episode was directed by Jeannot Szwarc, his third directional credit for the series. The episode featured one-time guest roles by actors Charles Parnell as Dr. James Falcon and Sean Campbell as Zach Alpert. Ryan McDonald reprised his role as Massive Dynamic scientist Brandon Fayette.

Alluding to the premise of "Reciprocity", story editor Glen Whitman noted that "often in science fiction simply because you need a source of conflict, it ends up being that science or technology is the source of evil. And that happens a lot in Fringe. I think that’s unavoidable. But the flip side of that coin is that on Fringe, science just as often ends up being able to save the day." The machine around which the episode is based was rendered using CGI.

Since the parallel universe was revealed in the season two finale, viewers have debated nicknames for the various doppelgangers featured. Olivia Dunham's double from the parallel universe was one such matter of contention; such nicknames included Bolivia, Fauxlivia, and Altlivia. "Reciprocity" was believed by some critics to have resolved this, as one character refers to her as Fauxlivia.

As with other Fringe episodes, Fox released a science lesson plan in collaboration with Science Olympiad for grade school children, focusing on the science seen in "Reciprocity", with the intention of having "students learn about the classification of blood into blood types based upon the molecules on the surface of red blood cells."

== Reception ==
=== Ratings ===
"Reciprocity" was the second episode to air on Friday in the United States. On its initial broadcast on January 28, 2011, "Reciprocity" maintained similar numbers of viewers from the previous episode, "The Firefly", with a 1.9/6 share and an estimated 4.57 million viewers. There was some concern that Fringe would be aired against Supernatural, a CW show with a similar science fiction theme, but that network decided to move the episode to the following week, when it aired opposite the Fringe episode "Concentrate and Ask Again". "Reciprocity" was broadcast against reruns and news programs from the other rival networks. It was the highest-rated program of the night, as it tied with NBC's Dateline, but its ratings were not enough to prevent the Fox network from placing fourth in total viewers. With time shifting devices taken into account, the episode had been watched by an estimated 6.17 million a week from its initial broadcast.

=== Reviews ===
"This was a very good episode, with enough 'mythology' in it to reward long-term viewers and enough new stuff to draw in new viewers."

— SFScope contributor Sarah Stegall

Reviews of the episode from television critics were generally positive. Ken Tucker from Entertainment Weekly enjoyed the scenes set at Massive Dynamic, and thought the episode did a good job tricking the audience into thinking Peter was not responsible for the shapeshifter killings. After not loving the previous week's episode, Andrew Hanson from the Los Angeles Times thought "Reciprocity" had "all the aspects of Fringe I loved". Hanson particularly loved the opening's first few minutes, and like Tucker, he was pleasantly surprised about Peter and the murders. The A.V. Club's Noel Murray graded "Reciprocity" with a B, explaining that despite the awe-inspiring opening (which reminded him of the film Close Encounters of the Third Kind) and the final revelations, Murray found the episode "solid but largely unexceptional". He thought the shapeshifter investigation "lacked a certain frisson" and found the Peter–Olivia relationship scenes to be "more of a drag".

SFScope contributor Sarah Stegall believed the episode "got us quickly back on track after last week's lackluster tale," and called the killer revelation the greatest shock she has received on the series thus far. She continued that one of her favorite parts of the Peter-as-a-killer arc is being able to watch the emotional setbacks he is facing as a result of Fauxlivia's betrayal; she called it "good characterization, and excellent acting". However, Stegall questioned why Massive Dynamic would build a machine known to be the destroyer of mankind. IGN columnist Ramsey Isler praised the writing staff because "just when you think they might be stuck in old habits, they come up with new ideas and put a whole new perspective on old storylines and characters." Isler continued that while "'Reciprocity'" isn't the most groundbreaking episode in the series, it does try a number of new ideas, and it gives us one big new plot point that could change the tone of the rest of the season."
