= Mick Kaczorowski =

American film producer (born 1960)

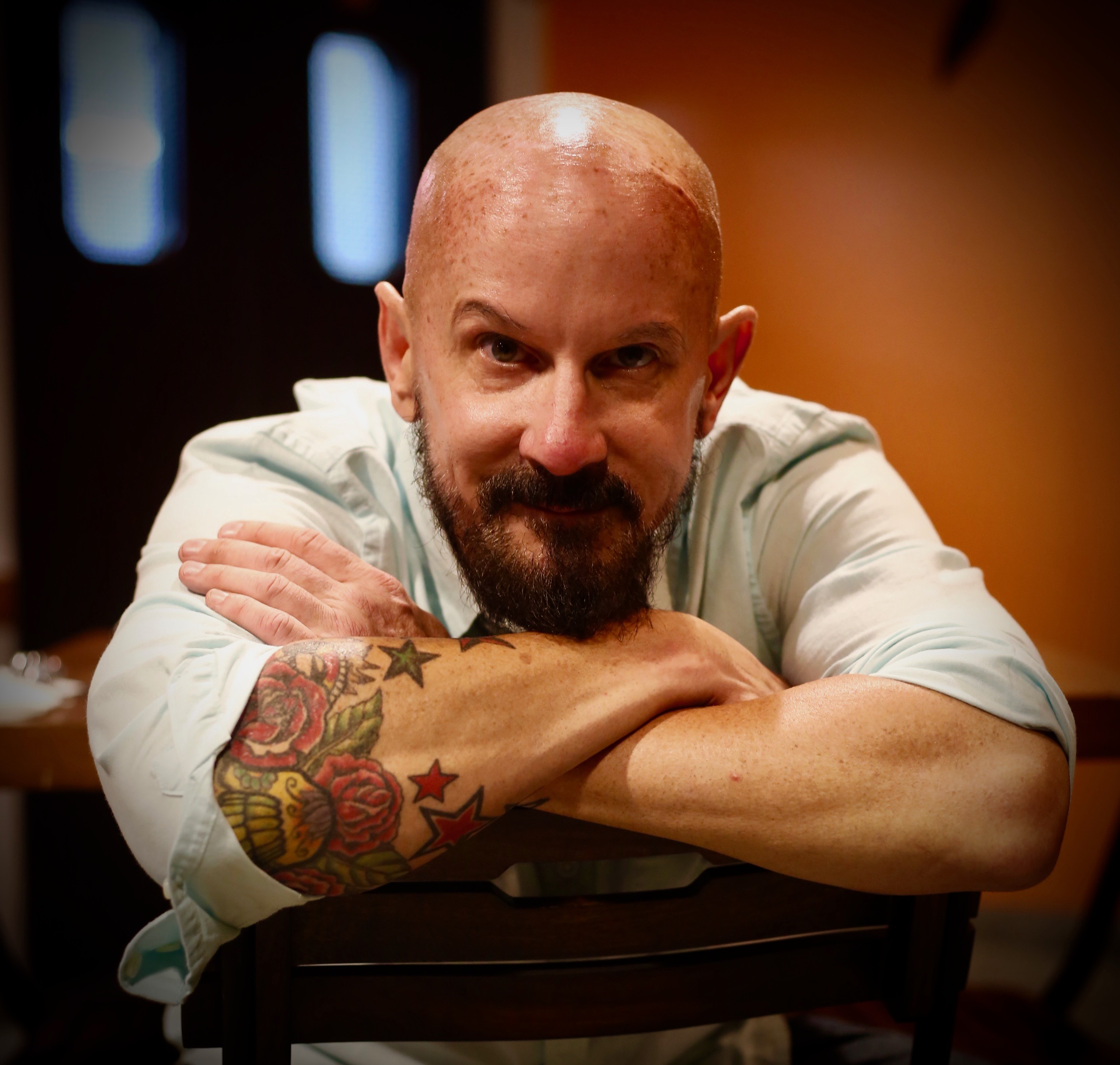
Mick Kaczorowski

Michael Kaczorowski (born January 4, 1960), a nine-time nominated and three-time Emmy Award-winning producer and executive producer, is currently the creative director and producer of Bangkok Swagger. As executive producer, he is responsible for some of Animal Planet and Discovery's biggest and most iconic hits including Carrier: Fortress at Sea, Raising the Mammoth, and Walking with Prehistoric Beasts.

Kaczorowski is also responsible for many of Discovery Channel and Animal Planet's long running hit series including Meerkat Manor, North Woods Law, River Monsters, Alaskan Bush Family, Wild West Alaska, Buggin with Rude, and American Stuffers. Kaczorowski has worked in Washington D.C. for Discovery Channel, Animal Planet and the National Geographic Society.

Kaczorowski began his filmmaking career in 1982 working in feature films for Director Robert Altman on Streamers, O.C. and Stiggs and Secret Honor. In 1985 Kaczorowski helped launch before it became National Geographic Television, and was a film editor for over 10 years editing over 40 films, earning two Emmy nominations for best editing for Dancing with Stingrays and Ocean Kayakers. He edited Discovery Channel's first original production Ivory Wars.

Kaczorowski joined Discovery Communications in 1994 holding many positions and titles across different Discovery networks. Over the next 20 years, he developed, supervised and managed everything from documentary specials and long running series, IMAX movies Wildfire: Feel the Heat, Discovery's first feature film The Leopard Son, Animal Planet's first feature film Meerkat Manor: The Story Begins and Animal Planet's first scripted drama The Whale. His production company Bangkok Swagger casts, develops and creates programing around the world for the web, social media and traditional television & cable networks.

== Biography ==
Mick grew up in Detroit, Michigan. He developed interest in film at a young age. His mother encouraged his interest in film by taking him to the cinema weekly. Yet, he didn't consider a career in film-making until his college years. Mick majored in psychology while attending the University of Michigan. His career changing decision came after enrolling in the English department film class where he studied the films of Swedish director Ingmar Bergman. " after I saw Sawdust and Tinsel the first film in the class, I knew that I wanted to be a filmmaker ". (Kaczorowski, 2016)

While at University of Michigan, Mick met the multi-award-winning director Robert Altman. In 1983, University of Michigan School of Music invited Altman to direct Stravinsky's opera, The Rake's Progress. Altman lectured about his films while in at the university. Mick Kaczorowski used this opportunity to take advantage of having the world renown Altman at the University. He began to work on the opera volunteering on all aspects of the production, attended his film lectures and rehearsals and waited tables at a restaurant frequented by Altman. He was later given the responsibility as primary note-taker for the director when the opera began stage rehearsals. Post-graduation, he moved to New York to continue working with Robert Altman. In New York, he worked as one of Altman's production assistants in New York and on location. He served in various capacities in the editing phase of Streamers, OC and Stiggs, and Secret Honor.

In 1985, Mick Kaczorowski assisted in the launching of National Geographic Explorer. Over the course of the next decade, he edited over 40 films. He was nominated an Emmy (1990) for Outstanding Individual Achievement in a Craft: Editing for "Dancing with the Stingrays" and (1993) Outstanding Individual Achievement in a Craft: Editing for “Ocean Kayakers”.

In 1994, Kaczorowski joined Discovery Communications and for the next 20 years worked across many different Discovery networks getting numerous Emmy nominations and winning three Prime-Time Emmy Awards his work. Over the years, he has managed, supervised and produced everything from Documentary specials and long running series, IMAX movies, Kaczorowski has helped to develop the careers of David Tutera, Dave Salmoni, Christopher Lowell, Robert Verde, Jeremy Wade, and others.

As a director, Kaczorowski has worked with a variety of talents, including directing narrations with John Gielgud, Rod Steiger, Linda Hunt, Stockard Channing, Novella Nelson, Kenneth Branagh, Brenda Vaccaro, Andre Braugher, William Shatner and many others.

Mick Kaczorowski was the senior producer for Discovery Channel's Carrier: Fortress at Sea. The documentary was well received. This earned him an Emmy (1996) for Outstanding Informational Programming Long Form.

== Awards and nominations ==
- 1990- Nominated for Outstanding Individual Achievement in a Craft: Editing Emmy for Dancing with Stingrays.
- 1996- Won Outstanding Informational Programming Long Form for Carrier: Fortress at Sea (1995).
- 2001- Won Outstanding Animated Program (For Programming More Than One Hour) Primetime Emmy for The Ballad of Big Al (2000). Shared with Sharon Reed (animation executive producer), William Sargent (animation executive producer), Tim Haines(animation producer), Kate Bartlett (writer), Michael Olmert (writer).
- 2002- Won Outstanding Animated Program (For Programming One Hour or More) Primetime Emmy for Walking with Beasts (2001). Shared with Tim Haines (executive producer), Jasper James (producer/writer), Nigel Paterson (producer/director/writer), Sharon Reed (computer animation executive producer), William Sargent (computer animation executive producer), Mike Milne (computer animation director), Kate Bartlett (writer), Michael Olmert (writer).
- 2006- Nominated for Outstanding Individual Achievement in a Craft: Music and Sound Emmy for Buggin' with Ruud (2005). Shared with Trevor Coleman (music), Richard Fiocca (music), Myungsoo Shin (music), Mervyn Aitchison (sound), Stacey Hertnon (sound), Dick Reade (sound), Craig Watson (sound), Peter Hayden (music & sound), Warren Saunders (music & sound).
- 2011- Nominated for Outstanding Nature Programming Emmy for The Secret Life of Elephants (2009). Shared with Sara Ford (executive producer), Nigel Pope (series producer), Holly Spearing (producer),
- 2012- Nominated for Outstanding Nature Programming Emmy for Polar Bears: Spy on the Ice (2011). Shared with John Downer (executive producer), Cassian Harrison (executive producer), Philip Dalton (producer).
- 2014- Nominated for Outstanding Nature Programming Emmy for Wild Arabia (2013).

== Filmography ==
This section outlines Kaczorowski's works as an editor and producer.

=== Restoration Wild Harvest Moon Saloon (2015) ===
Aired in December 2015, Restoration Wild Showcases Master restorer Jay Chaikin repurpose Dilapidated structures and abandoned spaces for modern use. Kaczorowski was the executive producer for the Episode “Harvest Moon Saloon”(Season 1 Episode 4) in which a 60-foot silo is transformed into a bar featuring stained glass, a chandelier and a spiral staircase on a Maryland farm that specializes in weddings and other special events.

=== North Woods Law (2012 – 2015) ===
Kaczorowski was the executive producer for 53 episodes and senior executive producer for the episode “Warden Warriors” (Season 1 Episode 101). North Woods law TV series follows Maine game wardens as they patrol the Pine Tree State to make sure hunters, tourists and outdoors enthusiasts play by the rules. In the episode, Warden Warriors follows Maine game wardens as they look for poachers, using night-vision equipment. Meanwhile, Warden LaFlamme must take matters into his own hands to protect the Maine public from a tragic outcome.

=== Alaskan Bush People (2014) ===
First aired in May, 2014, the TV show showcases an Alaskan family of nine who live in the wilderness. Kaczorowski was the executive producer for 5 episodes: The Wild Life, Fight or Flight, Blindsided, Human Wolf Pack, Raised Wild.

=== Fool’s Gold (2014) ===
It showcases Amateur miners search for gold in Northern Ontario. The show was aired in May, 2014. Kaczorowski was the executive producer for 8 episodes: No country for Gold Men, Gold habits die hard, On the haunt for Gold, A chip of the gold block, Miner altercations, Chasing their tailings, What gold is new again, A Miner setback.

=== Wild West Alaska (2013 – 2014) ===
Premiered on January 13, 2013, Wild West Alaska is a reality series following the crew at a gun shop in Alaska called Wild West Guns. Kaczorowski was the executive producer for 21 episodes between 2013 and 2014.

=== Rattlesnake Republic (2011 – 2014) ===
Premiered in February, 2012, the plot revolves around the Rattlesnake wranglers in Texas who remove the venomous vipers from residential areas, farms and job sites. Kaczorowski was the executive producer for 21 episodes.

=== The Whale (2013) ===
Mick Kaczorowski was the executive producer for the TV movie. The Whale is a British television film that was first broadcast on BBC One on 22 December 2013. Terry Cafolla wrote the film about the Essex incident in 1820, which also formed the basis of Herman Melville's Moby-Dick. The Whale was also broadcast on Animal Planet in the United States during the summer of 2014.

=== North America (2013) ===
North America is a miniseries that aired on the Discovery Channel. It premiered on May 19, 2013. The series is the first natural history landmark series on the Discovery Channel that is internally produced. The series has also been aired on Animal Planet. Kaczorowski was the executive producer for the following episodes: Revealed (2013), Outlaws and Skeletons (2013), Savage Edge (2013), Learn Young or Die (2013), No Place to Hide (2013), Born to Be Wild (2013).

=== Wild Arabia (2013) ===
Premiered on 22 February 2013, is a British nature documentary series. Produced by the BBC Natural History Unit and narrated by Alexander Siddig, the three-part series focuses on the landscapes, wildlife and people of the Arabian Peninsula. Kaczorowski was the executive producer for 3 episodes: Shifting Sands (2013), The Jewel of Arabia (2013), Sand, Wind and Stars (2013).

=== Wild Appalachia (2013) ===
Kaczorowski was the executive producer of Wild Appalachia, the TV series. The host played by Robert Jiminez explores the Great Smoky Mountains in the southeastern US. Directed by Simon Nash, the documentary features a look at the flora and fauna of the region and includes profiles of the rangers who patrol its vast wilderness.

=== Wild Hawaii (2012) ===
Wild Hawaii is a 2012 TV documentary, first released on 20 April 2014. Kaczorowski was the executive producer of Animal planet and handled the production of the documentary. The documentary was nominated for News & Documentary Emmy Award for Outstanding Nature Programming.

=== American Stuffers (2012) ===
Premiered on 5 January 2012 "American Stuffers" follows the happenings at the shop, located in the backyard of its owner and founder, Daniel Ross, in Romance, Ark., that specializes in giving its grieving clients a loving and lasting alternative to cremation or burial. Kaczorowski was the executive producer at animal planet and the TV series was produced under his guidance.

=== Wild Amazon: Savage Realm (2011) ===
Kaczorowski was the executive producer of TV documentary, Wild Amazon: Salvage Realm.

=== Bite of the Living Dead (2011) ===
Kaczorowski was the executive producer of this show. Premiered on 14 October 2011, the TV documentary showcases two victims of krait, a venomous snake's bite. The krait's venom causes the victim to suffer from "locked-in syndrome," where the body becomes paralyzed but the mind can still function. The plot set in a rural village of India and isolated region of Myanmar. The documentary portrays Joseph Bruno "Joe" Slowinski, Ph.D. (November 15, 1962 – September 12, 2001) an American herpetologist attempt to survive the bite of the deadly krait while working in an isolated region of Myanmar.

=== The Bear Whisperer (2011) ===
Kaczorowski was the executive producer for animal planet during development of this TV show.

=== Polar Bears: Spy on the Ice (2011) ===
Premiered on 10 March 2011, the documentary is mainly shot using Icebergcam, Blizzardcam and Snowballcam. Set in the Arctic islands of Svalbard in Norway, the spycams are set very close to polar bears to study their activities. When their curious subjects discover the cameras, the cameras are subjected to some comical-but-destructive encounters. The show was nominated for News & Documentary Emmy Award for Outstanding Nature Programming. Kaczorowski was the executive producer at Animal Planet during development of the show.

=== Mutant Planet (2010) ===
Premiered on 4 December 2010, the original title was changed from “Life Force” to “Mutant Planet” for USA audience. The show examines the animal species from different regions of the world and how their habitats may have shaped their evolution. The show's main focus was on animals displaying ingenious lifestyles and unorthodox patterns of behavior. Kaczorowski was the executive producer for the first six episodes for the series. Kaczorowski was the executive producer for the following episodes: Japan (2010), Brazil's Cerrado (2010), Africa's Rift Valley Lakes (2010), Australia (2010), Madagascar (2010), New Zealand (2010).

=== Safari: An Extraordinary Adventure (2008 – 2010) ===
The documentary follows the efforts of wild life conservationists trying to aid an out-of-control elephant population. Safari: AN Extraordinary Adventure premiered in May 2005, showcases the exotic and stunning wildlife in the South African Wilderness. Kaczorowski was the executive producer for the following episodes: The Last Lion of Liuwa (2010), Meet the Jackals (2008).

=== Underdog to - Wonderdog (2009 – 2010) ===
Premiered on 3 January 2009, Underdog to - Wonderdog showcases rescued, rehabilitated stray dogs who are ultimately placed in loving homes courtesy of the Doggie - Wonder Team. The "doggie dream team" rescues abandoned strays that haven't been adopted from a shelter and, after some training and grooming sessions, finds loving homes for these once-sad pooches. Kaczorowski was the executive producer of the following episodes: Duke's a Hazard! (2010), Flying Dogs for Triplets (2010), Duke and the Dribbler (2010), Lucky to Be Alive (2010), Operation: Baghdad Dog (2010), You Gotta Have Faith (2010), Quints Plus Canine Equals Chaos! (2010), Amazing Chase (2010), Dog Phobia (2010), Petrified Pit Bull (2010), Bella (2009), Nellie (2009), Sam (2009), Venus (2009), Joshua (2009), Woobie (2009), Oliver (2009), Brownie (2009), Benlo (2009), Lucky (2009).

=== Monsters Inside Me (2009) ===
Premiered on 1 July 2009, Monsters Inside Me showcases people who have contracted and survived rare and deadly diseases, infections, or parasites. Kaczorowski was the executive producer for the following episodes: Outbreak (2009), Sleeper Cells (2009).

=== River Monsters (2009) ===
Premiered on 5 April 2009, River Monsters is a wildlife documentary television program produced for Animal Planet by Icon Films of Bristol, United Kingdom. Hosted by extreme angler and biologist Jeremy Wade, it showcases the most fearsome freshwater killers, and stories about people who were dragged underwater by these vicious predators. He tries to catch the biggest specimens and then release them back into the wild. His aim is to save these rare creatures from extinction and to help people understand the truth behind the horrific attacks on humans. Kaczorowski was the execute producer of the following episodes: Freshwater Shark (2009), Amazon Flesh Eaters (2009), Amazon Assassins (2009), European Maneater (2009), Alligator Gar (2009), Killer Catfish (2009), Piranha (2009).

=== Mutual of Omaha's Wild Kingdom (2007 – 2009) ===
Premiered on 17 September 2002, is the revival of Wild Kingdom. Hosted by Stephanie Arne, Mutual of Omaha's Wild Kingdom showcased stories about the world's wildest places and creatures. Kaczorowski was the execute producer of the following episodes: Tigerhounds (2009), Hyena Princess (2008), Borneo's Pygmy Elephants (2007), Last Lions of India (2007).

==== Natural World (2006 – 2009) ====
Natural World is a documentary about wildlife and the environment. Kaczorowski was the executive producer of the following episodes: Snow Monkeys of Japan (2009), The Last Lions of India (2006), The Bear Man of Kamchatka (2006).

=== The Secret Life of Elephants (2009) ===
Premiered on 14 January 2009, The Secret Life of Elephants is a BBC nature documentary series following the lives of elephants and the work of the conservation charity Save the Elephants in Samburu National Reserve, Kenya. The three-part series follows the lives of African elephants in Samburu, Northern Kenya, focusing on the stories of individual elephants to show the most dramatic moments of their lives. It was nominated for News & Documentary Emmy Award for Outstanding Nature Programming. Kaczorowski was the executive producer for the show.

=== Dancing with Dogs (2008) ===
Kaczorowski was the executive producer at Animal Planet during the development of this show, which premiered on 6 December 2008. Hosted by actor Alec Mapa and comedian Katy Massey, it showcases teams of dog-owners, ranging from beginner to advanced, dancing to rock ‘n’ roll, hip-hop, classical and country.
