= Ad Astra (film) =

2019 film by James Gray

- Theatrical release poster
- Directed by: James Gray
- Written by: James Gray; Ethan Gross
- Produced by: Brad Pitt; Dede Gardner; Jeremy Kleiner; James Gray; Anthony Katagas; Rodrigo Teixeira; Arnon Milchan
- Starring: Brad Pitt; Tommy Lee Jones; Ruth Negga; Liv Tyler; Donald Sutherland
- Cinematography: Hoyte van Hoytema
- Edited by: John Axelrad; Lee Haugen
- Music by: Max Richter
- Production companies: 20th Century Fox; Regency Enterprises; Bona Film Group; New Regency Productions; Plan B Entertainment; Keep Your Head Productions; RT Features; MadRiver Pictures
- Distributed by: 20th Century Fox
- Release dates: August 29, 2019 (Venice); September 20, 2019 (United States); September 26, 2019 (Brazil)
- Running time: 123 minutes
- Countries: United States; Brazil
- Language: English
- Budget: $80–100 million
- Box office: $135.2 million

Ad Astra (Latin for "To the stars") is a 2019 psychological (Note: Attributed to multiple references:) science fiction film directed by James Gray who co-wrote with Ethan Gross. Starring Brad Pitt, Tommy Lee Jones, Ruth Negga, Liv Tyler, and Donald Sutherland, it follows an astronaut who ventures into space in search of his lost father, whose obsessive quest to discover intelligent alien life at all costs threatens the Solar System and all life on Earth.

The project was announced in early 2016, with Gray stating he wanted to feature "the most realistic depiction of space travel that's been put in a movie". Pitt signed on to star in August 2016 and the rest of the cast, save Tyler, joined in 2017. Filming began around Los Angeles that August, lasting through October. Tyler was added to the cast in 2018 after unsatisfactory test screenings mandated a love interest for Pitt's character.

Ad Astra premiered at the Venice Film Festival on August 29, 2019, and was theatrically released in the United States on September 20, by 20th Century Fox. The film received critical acclaim from critics, with particular praise for Pitt's performance, but underperformed at the box office, grossing $135.2 million against an $80–100 million budget. At the 92nd Academy Awards, it was nominated for Best Sound Mixing.

== Plot ==
In the early 22nd century, mysterious cosmic-ray bursts emanating from Neptune cause power surges that threaten to destroy all life in the Solar System. Major Roy McBride is informed that the surge is antimatter in origin and may be connected to the Lima Project, a space station in orbit around Neptune, sent twenty-nine years earlier to search for intelligent life and fuelled by antimatter. Roy's father, Clifford McBride, was the project's leader, a man considered a hero in SpaceCom history. Contact was lost sixteen years into its mission. Roy agrees to travel to Mars to use the last active communications station unaffected by the bursts in an effort to contact Clifford aboard the Lima.

At the Moon SpaceCom base, Roy is told in secret by Colonel Pruitt that should he fail to make contact with the Lima Project, the station will have to be destroyed. Roy obtains passage to Mars on the cruiser Cepheus.

On the way to Mars the Cepheus attends a distress call from a research station, where the captain is killed. The ship continues to Mars but is hit by a surge as it is landing, Roy assumes command from the overwhelmed (but now in charge) First Officer, and calmly lands the ship. After securing himself in the underground SpaceCom complex, Roy begins recording officially pre-written voice messages and transmitting them to the Lima Project in hopes that his father will respond. Following several failed attempts, Roy ends up ignoring the official message and sends a personal message to his father stating that he hopes he will see him one day. Roy is then told he will be returning to Earth as his 'personal connection' makes him unsuitable for further service.

Roy is visited by facility director Helen Lantos, who reveals that her parents were Lima Project team members. She shows him classified footage revealing that Clifford's team mutinied and attempted to return to Earth, causing him to shut off their life-support systems; her parents were among those killed. She also states that the Cepheus is carrying a nuclear weapon and has now been requisitioned for a secret 'seek and destroy' mission without Roy. Seeing that the 'hero' story was fabricated to hide the truth, Roy decides that he should deal with his father. Lantos facilitates Roy getting to the rocket as it prepares to depart.

Roy climbs aboard as the rocket takes off and is immediately discovered by the crew, who are unintentionally killed in the confrontation. During the 79-day journey to Neptune, a solitary Roy reflects on his relationship with his father and with his estranged wife, Eve. He finally arrives at the station and plants the nuclear bomb before encountering Clifford, the sole survivor of the Lima Project. Clifford explains that the surges are coming from an antimatter meltdown caused by the mutiny. He also admits to Roy that he never really cared about his family and does not consider Earth his home. Yet despite his efforts, the Lima Project found no other intelligent life in the entire knowable universe.

Roy copies data gathered about numerous planets by the Lima Project team and persuades Clifford to accompany him back to Earth. He arms the bomb and they climb out on the station's outer hull to return to the Cepheus. Clifford suddenly launches them into space using his spacesuit's thrusters. The old man pleads for Roy to untether and leave him; Roy reluctantly does so and watches his father drift away into space. He propels himself back to the Cepheus using his own spacesuit. Roy sends a message back to SpaceCom to ensure that if his return journey should fail, SpaceCom would make every effort to retrieve the data he has recovered from the Lima Project. Roy uses the shock wave from the nuclear explosion from the station as his primary propellant to propel the Cepheus back towards Earth.

Despite finding no signs of other life, the data from the Lima Project contains a treasure trove of information on many 'magnificent' worlds. Roy is entranced by their beauty and wonder, something that was lost on his father. He returns to Earth with a newfound optimism he was previously lacking, meeting with his estranged wife again.

== Cast ==
- Brad Pitt as Roy Richard McBride, a major in U.S. Space Command
- Tommy Lee Jones as H. Clifford McBride, Roy's father, and the Commander of the missing Lima Project
- Ruth Negga as Helen Lantos
- Liv Tyler as Eve McBride, Roy's wife
- Donald Sutherland as Colonel Thomas Pruitt
- John Ortiz as Lieutenant General Rivas
- Greg Bryk as Chip Garnes
- Loren Dean as Donald Stanford
- Natasha Lyonne as Tanya Pincus
- John Finn as Brigadier General Stroud
- Kimberly Elise as Lorraine Deavers
- Sean Blakemore as Willie Levant
- Bobby Nish as Franklin Yoshida
- LisaGay Hamilton as Major General Amelia Vogel
- Donnie Keshawarz as Captain Lawrence Tanner

== Production ==
=== Development ===
Director and co-writer James Gray had originally met co-writer Ethan Gross while attending the USC School of Cinematic Arts together in the late 1980s. In June 2007, Gross contacted Gray, pitching the idea of a sci-fi film inspired by 2001: A Space Odyssey (1968). The two worked on the story intermittently, referring to it initially as Lima Project. On February 21, 2013, Gray and Gross would pitch the concept to producers Rodrigo Teixeira and Sophie Mas of RT Pictures at Babbo, an Italian restaurant in Manhattan. After Teixeira and Mas agreed to finance the screenwriting process, Gray and Gross would submit several drafts between November 29, 2013, and May 22, 2015, partly to solicit feedback from producers and colleagues: some of the changes made in this period included changing the character of John Gates, a father figure to main character Roy McBride, to Roy's actual father, before further rewriting the story so that the father was killed while in a cryogenic state, rather than in an active confrontation in earlier drafts. In addition, the story had originally been set on Saturn, but the release of Interstellar (2014) caused the setting to be moved to Neptune to draw more of a distinction between the two films.

Gray first confirmed his plans to write and direct Ad Astra on May 12, 2016, during the 2016 Cannes Film Festival. Six months later, Gray would consult theoretical physicist Lawrence Krauss to assist in improving the film's scientific accuracy: one major change that resulted from this was the removal of a plot point regarding antimatter being found on Neptune. Despite this, critics cite multiple issues with scientific accuracy and feasibility, regarding significant plot points such as the Mars underground lake, asteroid belt around Neptune, and spaceflight logistics.

In April 2017, while promoting The Lost City of Z, Gray compared the story of Ad Astra to the 1899 novella Heart of Darkness. Gray also mentioned that he intended for the film to feature "the most realistic depiction of space travel that's been put in a movie and to basically say, 'Space is awfully hostile to us'". Gray also confirmed that filming for Ad Astra would commence on July 17, 2017.

=== Casting ===
In August 2016, while Gray was screening The Lost City of Z to producer Brad Pitt, the former had a conversation with the latter to discuss Ad Astra. Pitt expressed interest and agreed to both star in and produce the film; on April 10, 2017, Gray publicly confirmed that Pitt would star in Ad Astra. In June, Tommy Lee Jones joined the cast to portray Pitt's lost father. In August, Ruth Negga, John Finn, and Donald Sutherland joined the cast.

=== Filming ===
Principal photography on the film began on August 10, 2017 in Santa Clarita, California, lasting 60 days. After initial post-production work, test screenings were held on May 30 and July 18, 2018; following poor reception, reshoots were conducted (although Pitt was unavailable), increasing the production budget from $80 million to over $100 million. The character of Eve—originally named Liv (the name being changed to avoid confusion with her actress, Liv Tyler)—was added as a love interest, and new scenes were added to the film; the according reshoots began on March 15, 2019, and lasted for seven days. Charlie Kaufman provided an uncredited rewrite of the voice-over dialogue in the film.

=== Post-production ===
The visual effects were by Moving Picture Company, Method Studios, Mr. X, Weta Digital, Brainstorm Digital, and Capital T, and supervised by Allen Maris, Christopher Downs, Guillaume Rocheron, Ryan Tudhope, Aidan Fraser, Olaf Wendt, Anders Langlands, Eran Dinur, Jamie Hallett, and Territory Studio. Gray consulted with experimental film scholars Gregory Zinman and Leo Goldsmith for inspiration on the visuals.

The film's post-production was completed c. August 7, 2019, when Pitt recorded the rewritten voice-over dialogue. Gray did not have control over the film's final cut, which he told The Hollywood Reporter was "as painful a thing as I have experienced outside the death of a loved one." In a 2026 interview, he added that he hoped to eventually be able to release his director's cut, saying "It would have been a very different movie... It would be 12 minutes shorter. I'm the only director who makes a shorter director's cut. I hope someday I'll do it. I mean, it's obviously not up to me, but I would love to do it — it would be thrilling for me."

=== Music ===
Max Richter composed the film's score and recorded it at AIR Studios in London. Additionally, Lorne Balfe and Nils Frahm contributed additional music for the score. The orchestra and choir were then recorded at Synchron Stage Vienna. The album was nominated for a Grammy Award for Best Score Soundtrack for Visual Media.

== Release ==
=== Theatrical ===
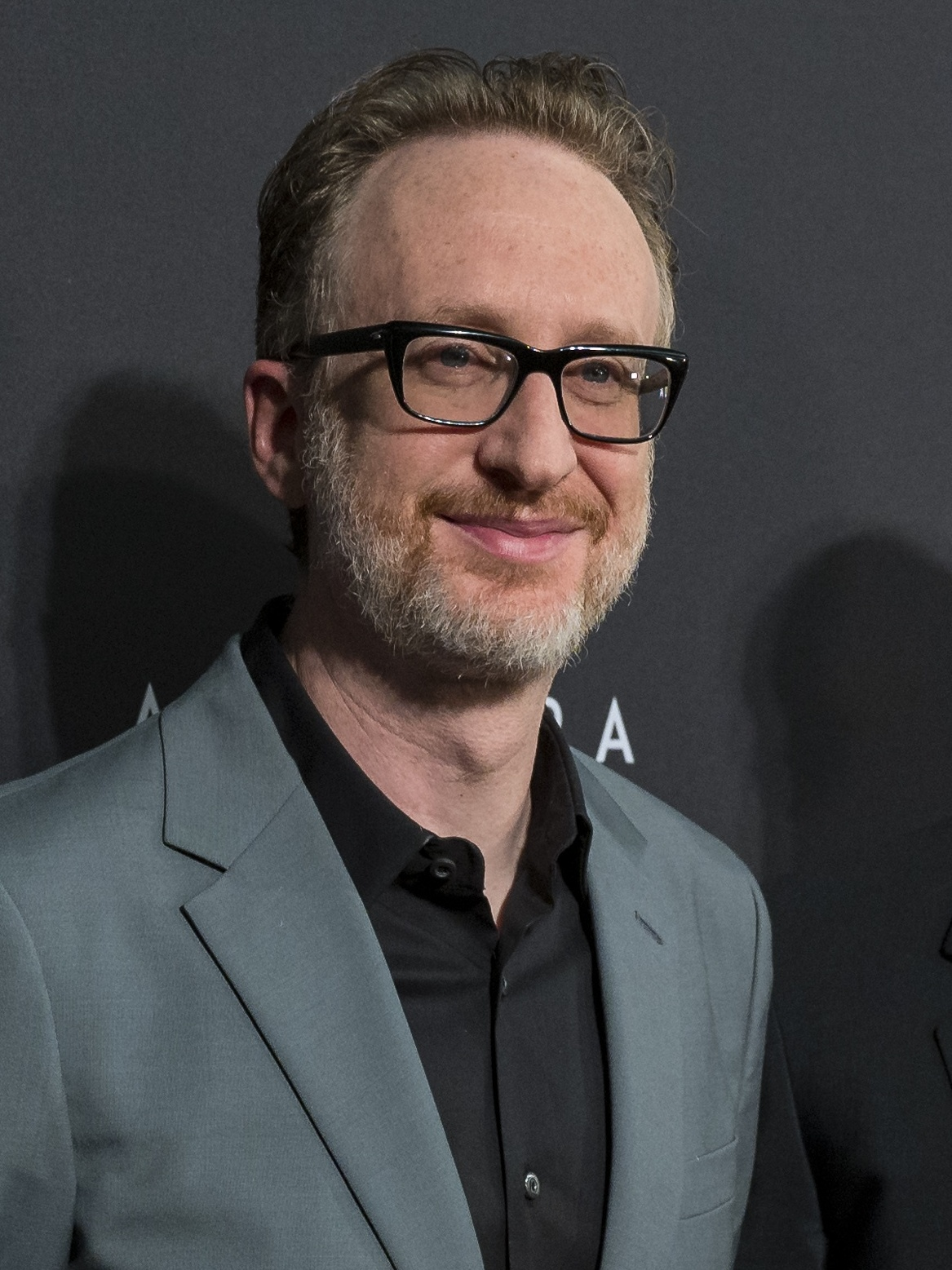
James Gray at the Ad Astra premiere in 2019

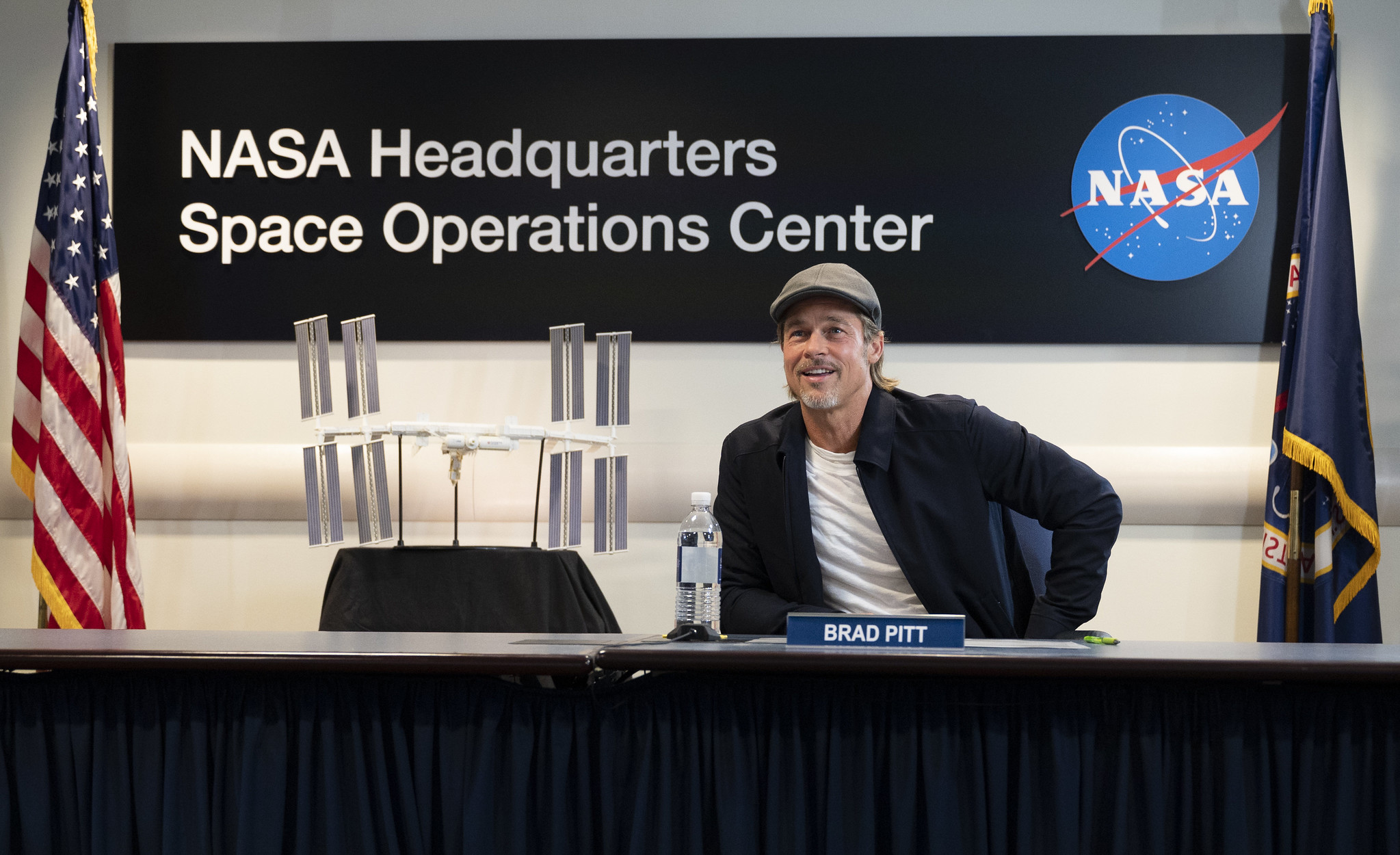
Brad Pitt speaking with ISS astronauts in a teleconference at NASA Headquarters Space Operations Center about the film's release

Ad Astra had its world premiere at the Venice Film Festival on August 29, 2019. and was released in the United States on September 20, 2019, by 20th Century Fox. The film received an early release in the United Kingdom, Ireland and France on September 18. It had previously been scheduled for January 11, 2019, and then for May 24 before being pushed back.

=== Home media ===
Ad Astra was released on digital and Movies Anywhere by 20th Century Fox Home Entertainment on December 3, 2019, with Blu-ray, 4K Ultra HD, and DVD releases following on December 17.

== Reception ==
=== Box office ===
Ad Astra grossed $50.2 million in the United States and Canada and $85 million in other territories, for a worldwide total of $135.2 million, against an estimated production budget of $80 million.

In the United States and Canada, the film was released alongside Downton Abbey and Rambo: Last Blood, and was projected to gross $15–20 million from 3,450 theaters in its opening weekend. The film made $7.2 million on its first day, including $1.5 million from Thursday night previews. It went on to debut to $19 million, finishing second behind Downton Abbey. The opening was compared to First Man (2018), another drama involving outer space which received high praise from critics but a lukewarm audience reception, resulting in a muted box office turnout despite its cast and budget. Deadline Hollywood deduced the film would lose $30 million off a projected $150 million final worldwide gross (a figure it would ultimately fall short of). The film made $10.1 million in its second weekend and $4.4 million in its third, finishing fifth and sixth, respectively.

=== Critical response ===
On Rotten Tomatoes, the film holds an approval rating of 83% based on 399 reviews, with an average rating of 7.5/10. The website's critical consensus reads, "Ad Astra takes a visually thrilling journey through the vast reaches of space while charting an ambitious course for the heart of the bond between parent and child." On Metacritic, which uses a weighted average, the film has a score of 80 out of 100, based on 56 critics, indicating "generally favorable" reviews. Audiences surveyed by CinemaScore gave the film an average grade of "B–" on an A+ to F scale, while those polled by PostTrak gave it an average 2.5 out of 5 stars, with 40% saying they would definitely recommend it.

Brian Tallerico, writing for RogerEbert.com, gave the film four out of four stars, writing that "This is rare, nuanced storytelling, anchored by one of Brad Pitt's career-best performances and remarkable technical elements on every level." Richard Roeper of the Chicago Sun-Times gave the film 3.5 out of 4 stars, writing, "In the hands of director and co-writer James Gray, Ad Astra is one of the most beautiful films of the year, even when it makes little sense and even when Brad Pitt's performance veers between one of his all-time best and one of his all-time not-best." David Ehrlich of IndieWire gave the film an "A" and said, "Ad Astra is one of the most ruminative, withdrawn, and curiously optimistic space epics this side of Solaris. It's also one of the best." Similarly, Xan Brooks of The Guardian gave the film five out of five stars, called it a "superb space-opera", and praised Pitt's performance, saying, "Pitt embodies McBride with a series of deft gestures and a minimum of fuss. His performance is so understated it hardly looks like acting at all." Variety critic Owen Gleiberman praised Pitt's performance, explaining, "Gray proves beyond measure that he's got the chops to make a movie like this. He also has a vision, of sorts – one that's expressed, nearly inadvertently, in the metaphor of that space antenna." Peter Travers of Rolling Stone rated the film four out of five stars and referred to it as "absolutely enthralling" and praised Gray for his direction and his unique approach to the science fiction genre, as well as the cinematography and Pitt's performance (whom he referred to as "marvel of nuanced feeling"). He also drew comparisons of the film's tone and themes to other notable films set in space, particularly 2001: A Space Odyssey (1968), Solaris (1972), Gravity (2013), and Interstellar (2014). Mark Kermode of The Guardian compared the film to "Event Horizon with interstellar overdrive", noting the similar premise to the 1997 film.

Critic Kurt Loder praised the visual effects but criticized the lack of originality and the patchwork style of the script. Adam Graham writing for The Detroit News found problems with the film, giving it a "C" rating: "This is slow, obtuse film-making with little emotional connection."

=== Accolades ===
Award	Date of ceremony	Category	Recipients	Result	Ref.
Academy Awards	February 9, 2020	Best Sound Mixing	Gary Rydstrom, Tom Johnson and Mark Ulano	Nominated	
Art Directors Guild Awards	February 1, 2020	Excellence in Production Design for a Fantasy Film	Kevin Thompson	Nominated	
Austin Film Critics Association	January 22, 2019	Best Cinematography	Hoyte van Hoytema	Nominated	
Chicago Film Critics Association Awards	December 14, 2019	Best Use of Visual Effects	Allen Maris, Jedediah Smith, Guillaume Rocheron and Scott R. Fisher	Nominated	
Critics' Choice Movie Awards	January 12, 2020	Best Visual Effects	Allen Maris, Jedediah Smith, Guillaume Rocheron and Scott R. Fisher	Nominated	
Critics' Choice Movie Awards	January 12, 2020	Best Sci-Fi/Horror Movie	Ad Astra	Nominated	
Dragon Awards	2020	Best Science Fiction or Fantasy Movie	Ad Astra	Nominated	
Dublin Film Critics Circle Awards	December 19, 2019	Best Cinematography	Hoyte van Hoytema	Nominated	
Dublin Film Critics Circle Awards	December 19, 2019	Best Actor	Brad Pitt	7th Place	
Florida Film Critics Circle Awards	December 23, 2019	Best Film	Ad Astra	Nominated	
Florida Film Critics Circle Awards	December 23, 2019	Best Cinematography	Hoyte van Hoytema	Nominated	
Florida Film Critics Circle Awards	December 23, 2019	Best Score	Max Richter	Nominated	
Florida Film Critics Circle Awards	December 23, 2019	Best Production Design	Kevin Thompson, Kevin Constant, Christa Munro, Alison Sadler, David Scott and Gary Warshaw	Nominated	
Florida Film Critics Circle Awards	December 23, 2019	Best Visual Effects	Allen Maris, Jedediah Smith, Guillaume Rocheron and Scott R. Fisher	Nominated	
Georgia Film Critics Association	January 10, 2020	Best Cinematography	Hoyte van Hoytema	Nominated	
Grammy Awards	March 14, 2021	Best Score Soundtrack for Visual Media	Ad Astra – Max Richter	Nominated	
Hollywood Critics Association	January 9, 2020	Best Visual Effects	Allen Maris, Jedediah Smith, Guillaume Rocheron and Scott R. Fisher	Nominated	
Houston Film Critics Society Awards	January 2, 2020	Best Visual Effects	Allen Maris, Jedediah Smith, Guillaume Rocheron and Scott R. Fisher	Nominated	
Indiewire Critics' Poll	December 16, 2019	Best Lead Actor	Brad Pitt	Nominated	
Jupiter Awards	August 29, 2020	Best International Film	Ad Astra	Nominated	
Online Film Critics Society Awards	January 6, 2020	Visual Effects	Allen Maris, Jedediah Smith, Guillaume Rocheron and Scott R. Fisher	Won	
Saturn Awards	October 26, 2021	Best Science Fiction Film Release	Ad Astra	Nominated	
Saturn Awards	October 26, 2021	Best Costume Design	Albert Wolsky	Nominated	
Saturn Awards	October 26, 2021	Best Film Special / Visual Effects	Scott R. Fisher and Allen Maris	Nominated	
San Diego Film Critics Society	December 9, 2019	Best Cinematography	Hoyte van Hoytema	Nominated	
San Diego Film Critics Society	December 9, 2019	Best Visual Effects	Allen Maris, Jedediah Smith, Guillaume Rocheron and Scott R. Fisher	Won	
Sant Jordi Awards	April 23, 2020	Best Actor in a Foreign Film	Brad Pitt	Won	
Seattle Film Critics Society	December 16, 2019	Best Visual Effects	Allen Maris, Jedediah Smith, Guillaume Rocheron and Scott R. Fisher	Won	
St. Louis Film Critics Association	December 15, 2019	Best Visual Effects	Allen Maris, Jedediah Smith, Guillaume Rocheron and Scott R. Fisher	Runner Up	
St. Louis Film Critics Association	December 15, 2019	Best Score	Max Richter	Nominated	
Venice Film Festival	September 7, 2019	Golden Lion	Ad Astra	Nominated	
World Stunt Awards	December 15, 2019	Best High Work	Stunt Team of Ad Astra	Nominated	

== See also ==
- List of films set on Mars
- Neptune in fiction
- List of appearances of the Moon in fiction
