= Ethan Gross =

American television writer

- Born: United States
- Occupation: Writer

Ethan Gross is an American television writer.

== Career ==
He worked for three seasons on the FOX science-fiction series Fringe, as executive story editor and writer.

He co-wrote the independent thriller Klepto with the film's director, Thomas Trail.

Gross co-wrote the screenplay for Ad Astra with James Gray, the director of The Lost City of Z.

=== Fringe episodes ===
- "The Man from the Other Side" (2.19) (co-written with co-executive producer Josh Singer)
- "Amber 31422" (3.05) (co-written by Singer)
- "Immortality" (3.13) (co-written by co-executive producer David Wilcox)
- "Forced Perspective" (4.10)
