= Forced Perspective (Fringe) =

- Fringe episode
- Episode no.: Season 4 Episode 10
- Directed by: David Solomon
- Written by: Ethan Gross
- Production code: 3X7010
- Original air date: January 27, 2012

Guest appearances
- Currie Graham as Jim Mallum; Alexis Raich as Emily Mallum

Episode chronology
← Previous "Enemy of My Enemy"	Next → "Making Angels"
- Fringe season 4

"Forced Perspective" is the tenth episode of the fourth season of the Fox science-fiction drama television series Fringe, and the series' 75th episode overall.

The episode was written by Ethan Gross and directed by David Solomon.

== Plot ==
Olivia (Anna Torv) contemplates the warning from the bald man—known to the viewer as the Observer September (Michael Cerveris)—about how she appears destined to be killed. Broyles (Lance Reddick) cautions her about taking unnecessary risks until they learn more about this man, but Olivia agrees to continue to perform her job.

A man is killed when a girder from a nearby construction site accidentally falls and impales him. The Fringe division is called in when they find the man was given a piece of paper from a young girl (Alexis Raich) moments before the accident, a drawing of his death in perfect detail. The Fringe team uses nearby security footage to determine the identity of the girl, Emily Mallum. They approach her father, Jim (Currie Graham), who initially lies about Emily, but eventually lets them in. Jim is aware that Emily has a gift for seeing the future, and he has been moving his family across country and changing their identities, trying to stay ahead of people who he believes are agents of Massive Dynamic using black panel vans, trying to take Emily and experiment on her ability to see the future. Jim refuses to allow the Fringe team to help out any further, but Olivia leaves him her card. Later, Olivia talks to Nina Sharp (Blair Brown) about Emily, who admits that Massive Dynamic has an interest in the girl, but only to study her abilities. Olivia begins to compare Emily's case to her own as a child in the Cortexiphan experiments, but is interrupted by a call from Emily, who wants to meet privately.

At a park bench near a lake, Emily shows Olivia her latest picture that she drew after encountering a man on a bus but wasn't able to hand to him: a pile of dead bodies. She explains her "gift", that when she is near someone that will die she gets flashes of their death in her mind. These visions have never failed to come to fruition, and she worries for the apparent death toll in this latest drawing. The drawing does not give enough information to guess where it may occur, so Olivia takes Emily to Walter's (John Noble) lab, where Walter believes that Emily's brain is picking up on the vibrations of traumatic events as they flow backwards in time. After obtaining Jim's approval, they hook Emily up to Walter's equipment, to allow her to explore her own mind under hypnosis. Within her vision of the forthcoming event, Emily recognizes that it is a result of an explosion, and enough of a sign to pinpoint the location, a nearby courthouse. The team is also able to identify the man aboard the bus, Albert Duncan. They conclude Duncan is about to blow up the courthouse. The team races there to discover Duncan targeting a judge that ruled against him in a child custody case, ruining his life. With Peter's (Joshua Jackson) help, the radio-controlled bomb is disabled, but Duncan further reveals he has a bomb strapped to himself. Olivia is able to talk him out of detonating it, saving everyone's lives, and taking Duncan into custody.

As they close the case, Olivia contacts Emily to pass on thanks, but gets Jim instead. Jim finds Emily missing from her bedroom, and the Fringe team sets off to follow a black van that Jim had spotted believing Emily was kidnapped; it turns out this was only a dry cleaning delivery van. Olivia quickly realizes where Emily has gone and directs Jim to meet her at the park bench by the lake. Emily is there in the bitter cold, and Jim sits down next to her coaxing her to get help, but she refuses. Olivia spots Emily's most recent drawing, of her and her father on the bench with her watching, and realizes that Emily is dying. Jim holds onto Emily as she dies from an overload of electrical activity in her brain caused by her ability.

Meanwhile, Walter and Peter continue to bond as they work to understand the principles of the Machine to allow Peter to return to his original timeline. Peter later explains to Olivia who the Observers are and their ability to be aware of the consequences of time. That evening, Nina drops by to visit Olivia, and upon hearing that she is still suffering from migraines at night, promises to send her new medicine that may help her. At exactly the same moment, outside of her home, an Observer is watching.

== Production ==
"Forced Perspective" was written by executive story editor Ethan Gross and Buffy the Vampire Slayer veteran David Solomon directed.

== Reception ==
=== Ratings ===
"Forced Perspective" was first broadcast on January 27, 2012 in the United States on Fox. An estimated 3.33 million viewers watched the episode, marking an increase in overall viewership from the previous episode and received its highest ratings of the season since the premiere episode.

=== Reviews ===
The A.V. Club gave the episode a B and called it "a solid case-of-the-week." The Los Angeles Times found Emily’s story unengaging and called it "a textbook example of anticlimcatic."
