= Concentrate and Ask Again =

- Fringe episode
- Episode no.: Season 3 Episode 12
- Directed by: Dennis Smith
- Written by: Matthew Pitts; Graham Roland
- Production code: 3X6112
- Original air date: February 4, 2011

Guest appearances
- Omid Abtahi as Simon Phillips; Kevin Corrigan as Sam Weiss; Jody Thompson as Sara Downey; J. R. Bourne as Agent Edwards; Paul Jarrett as Warren Blake; Richard Keats as Don; Ian Robison as George; Carlos Diaz as Randall; Sylvesta Stuart as Dillon

Episode chronology
← Previous "Reciprocity"	Next → "Immortality"
- Fringe season 3

"Concentrate and Ask Again" is the 12th episode of the third season of the American science fiction drama television series Fringe, and the 55th episode overall. In the episode, the Fringe division enlists the help of a troubled telepathic man (Omid Abtahi) in their investigation of a mysterious blue killing powder. Abtahi, Kevin Corrigan, Jody Thompson, and Paul Jarrett guest-starred.

Graham Roland and Matthew Pitts co-wrote the episode, while Dennis Smith directed. The episode first aired in the United States on February 4, 2011, to an estimated 4.3 million viewers on its initial broadcast, a 16-percent drop in viewership from the previous two Friday episodes, "Reciprocity" and "The Firefly". "Concentrate and Ask Again" received mixed to positive reviews from television critics, with writers praising the advancement of the series' mythology but criticizing the main mystery plot.

== Plot ==
A lead scientist for a pharmaceutical company is killed by a blue powder that turns his bones into dust. The Fringe division traces the source of the package which contained the powder to a former Marine; when they search his home, Peter (Joshua Jackson) finds the man nearby and gives chase, but the man is hit by a car and knocked into a coma. Broyles (Lance Reddick) fears that there may be others involved in targeted attacks. Walter (John Noble) suggests they read the man's mind to learn of any such plot using the ability of one of his undocumented nootropic Cortexiphan patients, Simon Phillips (Omid Abtahi). Simon, who is unable to control his telepathic abilities, has isolated himself from the general population for two decades, but finds some comfort in not being able to read the mind of Olivia (Anna Torv)—a fellow Cortexiphan patient. Olivia convinces Simon to help them with the ongoing investigation despite the mental anguish he will suffer in a large crowded city such as Boston. During their time together, Olivia explains her concerns over Peter, wondering if he still feels any attraction to her alternate self, Fauxlivia, in the parallel universe. Meanwhile, three military contractors are killed by the release of the compound in an elevator, confirming Broyles' fears.

With Simon's ability and Nina Sharp's (Blair Brown) help, the team learn of a "Project Jellyfish", a secret military bioweapon project that the comatose man and two others were involved in, aimed at developing a chemical agent that destroys skeletons. Though they were given inoculations to negate the effects of the chemical agent, their exposure was passed to their stillborn children who had developed without skeletons. Realizing that the men are seeking revenge on those involved with Project Jellyfish, the Fringe team determines the identity of the last intended victim, a former military general running for public office. With Simon's help, Olivia is able to neutralize the two targets before they release the powder at a dinner gala for the general. As Olivia returns Simon to his home, he hands her an envelope that contains what he had read of Peter's thoughts.

In side plots, Nina has recovered different translations of the tomes about the First People, including one from William Bell's personal safe, and realizes that they all say the same thing in different languages. She identifies the name of the author of each book as an anagram of the name "Sam Weiss", the bowling alley owner who she had directed Olivia to after her initial return from the parallel universe. She approaches Sam, who does not deny he wrote the books, and who explains that the doomsday device being constructed can either create or destroy a universe; how that will work will depend on Peter, who is biologically tuned to the device. Sam posits that Peter will most likely save the universe from which the Olivia he loves originates. The episode ends with Olivia reading the note from Simon, which states that Peter still has feelings for Fauxlivia.

== Production ==
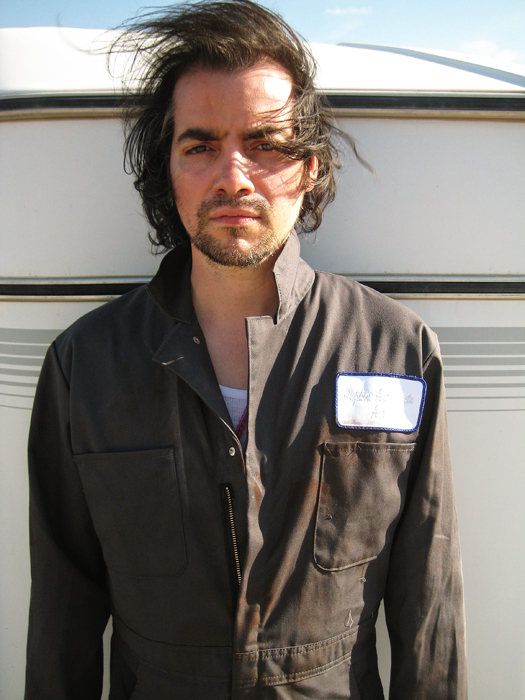
Guest star Kevin Corrigan returned as Sam Weiss.

"Concentrate and Ask Again" was written by co-producer Graham Roland and story editor Matthew Pitts, a former assistant of series co-creator J. J. Abrams. The last episode Roland co-wrote was the season three episode "The Abducted", while Pitts' last writing credit was the season three episode "Do Shapeshifters Dream of Electric Sheep?". Dennis Smith directed the episode, his first Fringe credit since the season two episode "August".

"Concentrate and Ask Again" featured guest star Omid Abtahi as telepathic Simon Phillips, his only credit for the series. Guest actor Kevin Corrigan returned as recurring character Sam Weiss. The episode featured guest stars Jody Thompson and Paul Jarrett as the new characters Sara Downey and Warren Blake, respectively. Thompson called the part "the kind of role that actors dream of". She described the episode, "The material was so compelling and perfectly written it was a matter of not getting in the way of what the creators had created. I’m anxious about how it will come off. Truthfully, I’ve been torturing myself, wondering if I have somehow ruined the beauty of what I read in the script".

As with other Fringe episodes, Fox released a science lesson plan in collaboration with Science Olympiad for grade school children, focusing on the science seen in "Concentrate and Ask Again", with the intention of having "students learn about bones and the nature of their chemical and physical composition."

== Reception ==
=== Ratings ===
"Concentrate and Ask Again" was watched by an estimated 4.3 million viewers in the United States on its initial broadcast, earning a 1.6 rating. It was a 16 percent drop in viewership from the previous two Friday episodes, "Reciprocity" and "The Firefly". With 7-day out time shifted viewings taken into account, over 6.0 million viewers ultimately watched "Concentrate and Ask Again", including a 56 percent increase in the 18–49 age group, the largest percentage gains of any other show of that week.

=== Reviews ===
"Despite a fairly pedestrian main plot (by Fringe standards, at least) there's plenty to like in this episode. I'm really digging seeing Blair Brown more often as Nina Sharp takes a more prominent role in the series, and I like how the writers are using all the tools in their toolbox (including Sam) to weave an intricate story and put new perspectives on characters we thought we knew well."

— IGN writer Ramsey Isler

The episode received mixed to fairly positive reviews. Entertainment Weekly staff member Ken Tucker called "Concentrate and Ask Again" the completion of a trilogy of episodes that "bring together a lot of the show's mythology." However, he did not believe the main plot to be all that fascinating, commenting that it "could have passed for an episode of Undercovers." Instead, Tucker enjoyed the smaller details in the episode, such as the room full of items owned by William Bell; he also praised guest actor Omid Abtahi's "marvelously anguished" performance.

Carissa Pavlica from TV Fanatic noted, "'Concentrate and Ask Again'" did little to drive the overriding story forward, but it did a brilliant job of making me question everything." Nonetheless, she commented that it "... was nowhere near as intense as 'Reciprocity'." IGN writer Ramsey Isler did not think there was anything "particularly remarkable about the core elements of this story – it's the same old formula that both Fringe and The X-Files used frequently – but the episode has a generous helping of little revealing character elements sprinkled throughout." Isler praised the final ten minutes for "provid[ing] some really interesting action" with Olivia's ending of the case, and the revelation of Simon's note in conjunction with Sam's knowledge of the First People. He ultimately graded the episode 7.5/10.

Fearnet staffer Alyse Wax highlighted the episode's opening scene in her review of the best television "kills" of 2011.
