= North Woods Law =

American reality television series

- Genre: Reality
- Narrated by: Charles Parnell; Mike McColl
- Country of origin: United States
- Original language: English
- No. of seasons: 16
- No. of episodes: 164

Production
- Executive producers: Jessica Winchell Morsa; Mick Kaczorowski; Devon Platte; Steve Engel
- Production company: Engel Entertainment

Original release
- Network: Animal Planet
- Release: March 11, 2012 – September 26, 2021

Related
- Northwest Law; Lone Star Law; Louisiana Law

North Woods Law is an American reality television series that debuted on March 11, 2012, on the Animal Planet channel. Originally set in Maine, the show followed numerous game wardens of the Maine Warden Service. Paul LePage, then governor of Maine, took credit for canceling the show, arguing that it was not a good reflection of Maine. Other sources noted controversy concerning a poaching sting operation.

In 2017, the show changed locations to New Hampshire, following members of the state's Fish and Game Department. The series was renewed for a sixteenth season, which began on June 20, 2021. As of July 2024, filming for the show is currently on hold, but the producers have expressed optimism for further episodes.

In 2025, the producers behind the show, Engel Entertainment, announced a new show following the conservation officers of New Hampshire under a new title, On Patrol New Hampshire, which streams on their YouTube page, The Game Warden Channel.

Lone Star Law is a spin-off series set in Texas.

== Cast ==
Maine

- Ryan Fitzpatrick
- Chris Simmons
- Scott Thrasher
- Tim Spahr
- Jonathan Parker
- Alan Curtis
- Rick LaFlamme
- Kris MacCabe
- Josh Bubier
- Ray Dineen
- Helen Dineen
- Eric Blanchard
- Aaron Cross
- Cody Lounder
- Pete Herring
- Josh Beal
- Troy Thibodeau
- Dan Christianson
- Jason Luce
- Ethan Buuck
- Dave Craven
- Joe McBrine
- Wayde Carter
- Alan Dudley
- Chad Robertson
- Dan Menard
- Carleton Richardson III
- Kevin Pelkey

New Hampshire

- Glen Lucas
- Jon Demler
- Heidi Murphy
- Shawn MacFadzen
- Ron Arsenault
- Bob Mancini
- Kevin Bronson
- Bill Boudreau
- K9 Ruby Boudreau
- Eric Hannett
- Graham Courtney
- Adam Cheney
- Geoff Pushee
- Eric Fluette
- K9 Moxie Fluette
- Levi Frye
- Rob McDermott
- Josiah Towne
- Chris Egan
- Matt Holmes
- James Benvenuti
- Joe Canfield
- K9 Cora Benvenuti
- Richard Crouse
- Brad Jones

== Episodes ==
Season summary
Season	Year(s)	Episodes	Location
1	2012	6	Maine
2	2013	10	Maine
3	2013	10	Maine
4	2014–15	19	Maine
5	2015	9	Maine
6	2015–16	10	Maine
7	2016	11	Maine
8	2017	6	New Hampshire
9	2017	6	New Hampshire
10	2018	12	New Hampshire
11	2018	12	New Hampshire
12	2019	12	New Hampshire
13	2019	10	New Hampshire
14	2020	9	New Hampshire
15	2020	11	New Hampshire
16	2021	12	New Hampshire

=== Season 1 (2012) ===
No. overall	No. in season	Title	Original release date
1	1	"Warden Warriors"	March 11, 2012
2	2	"Moose Mania"	March 16, 2012
3	3	"Off Roadin'"	March 23, 2012
4	4	"Gun Country"	March 30, 2012
5	5	"On Thin Ice"	April 13, 2012
6	6	"Maine Freeze"	April 20, 2012

=== Season 2 (2013) ===
No. overall	No. in season	Title	Original release date	U.S. viewers (millions)
7	1	"Wicked Summer"	January 24, 2013	1.27
8	2	"Boat Load of Trouble"	January 31, 2013	1.12
9	3	"Harvest Time"	February 7, 2013	0.99
10	4	"The Rookies"	February 21, 2013	0.63
11	5	"Things Are Afowl"	February 28, 2013	0.84
12	6	"Racking up the Bad Guys"	March 7, 2013	0.84
13	7	"The Crime of the Century"	March 14, 2013	0.77
14	8	"Deer Deception"	March 21, 2013	0.75
15	9	"Crossing the Line"	March 28, 2013	0.91
16	10	"Uncuffed"	April 4, 2013	0.58

=== Season 3 (2013) ===
No. overall	No. in season	Title	Original release date
17	1	"Ice Out"	October 3, 2013
18	2	"Turkey Dog"	October 10, 2013
19	3	"24 Hours on the Job"	October 17, 2013
20	4	"Running Cold and Fast"	October 24, 2013
21	5	"Mud Season"	November 7, 2013
22	6	"Summer Heats Up"	November 14, 2013
23	7	"Mysteries in the Moose State"	November 21, 2013
24	8	"Life on the Border"	December 5, 2013
25	9	"Lost and Found"	December 12, 2013
26	10	"Uncuffed 2"	December 19, 2013

=== Season 4 (2014–15) ===
No. overall	No. in season	Title	Original release date
27	1	"Cheaters"	May 29, 2014
28	2	"Just One More"	June 5, 2014
29	3	"The End is Near"	June 12, 2014
30	4	"Throttle Out"	June 19, 2014
31	5	"Cold As Ice"	June 26, 2014
32	6	"Outfoxed"	October 5, 2014
33	7	"Man vs Animal"	October 5, 2014
34	8	"Moose on the Loose"	October 12, 2014
35	9	"Take the Plunge"	October 12, 2014
36	10	"Distress Call"	October 19, 2014
37	11	"All Hands On Deck"	October 19, 2014
38	12	"Trail of Trouble"	November 2, 2014
39	13	"Night and Day"	November 2, 2014
40	14	"Star Spangled Weekend"	November 16, 2014
41	15	"High Jinks"	November 23, 2014
42	16	"Wild Kingdom"	November 30, 2014
43	17	"Passing the Torch"	December 7, 2014
44	18	"'Tis the Season"	December 21, 2014
45	19	"Rapid Responders"	January 11, 2015

=== Season 5 (2015) ===
No. overall	No. in season	Title	Original release date
46	1	"Takedown"	March 8, 2015
47	2	"Judgement Day"	March 15, 2015
48	3	"Wild Moose Chase"	March 22, 2015
49	4	"Hot on the Heels"	March 29, 2015
50	5	"To Serve and Protect"	July 19, 2015
51	6	"Down to the Wire"	July 26, 2015
52	7	"Deer Detectives"	July 26, 2015
53	8	"The Nick of Time"	August 9, 2015
54	9	"Warden vs. Wild"	August 16, 2015

=== Season 6 (2015–16) ===
No. overall	No. in season	Title	Original release date
55	1	"And the Little Ones Too"	November 15, 2015
56	2	"Above and Beyond"	November 22, 2015
57	3	"Dirty Habits"	November 29, 2015
58	4	"Truth Be Told"	December 6, 2015
59	5	"Occupational Hazards"	January 3, 2016
60	6	"Catcher in the Wild"	January 10, 2016
61	7	"In a Hot Second"	January 17, 2016
62	8	"Close Encounters of the Wild Kind"	January 17, 2016
63	9	"Can't Believe Your Eyes"	January 31, 2016
64	10	"The Rescuers"	February 14, 2016

=== Season 7 (2016) ===
No. overall	No. in season	Title	Original release date
65	1	"Long Shot"	June 2, 2016
66	2	"Antlers And Antics"	June 9, 2016
67	3	"Weed It And Reap"	June 16, 2016
68	4	"Dead Moose Talking"	June 23, 2016
69	5	"Excuses, Excuses"	June 30, 2016
70	6	"The Big Bad Woods"	July 7, 2016
71	7	"Baiters Beware"	July 14, 2016
72	8	"Crossed Wired"	July 21, 2016
73	9	"Shifting Gears"	July 28, 2016
74	10	"Buck Fever"	August 4, 2016
75	11	"Homecoming"	August 11, 2016

=== Season 8 (2017) ===
No. overall	No. in season	Title	Original release date
76	1	"Fighting the Flood"	March 5, 2017
77	2	"Alligator Showdown"	March 12, 2017
78	3	"Hunting the Hunters"	March 19, 2017
79	4	"Manhunt"	March 26, 2017
80	5	"No Way Out"	April 2, 2017
81	6	"Into Thin Air"	April 9, 2017

=== Season 9 (2017) ===
No. overall	No. in season	Title	Original release date
82	1	"When Duty Calls"	September 3, 2017
83	2	"On the Run"	September 10, 2017
84	3	"Truth or Consequences"	September 17, 2017
85	4	"Blindsided"	September 24, 2017
86	5	"Under Suspicion"	October 1, 2017
87	6	"Crossing the Line"	October 8, 2017

=== Season 10 (2018) ===
No. overall	No. in season	Title	Original release date
88	1	"Out Of Control"	January 7, 2018
89	2	"Cold Case"	January 14, 2018
90	3	"No Room For Error"	January 21, 2018
91	4	"Breaking And Entering"	January 28, 2018
92	5	"Weed Whackers"	February 11, 2018
93	6	"Too Close For Comfort"	February 18, 2018
94	7	"Caught In A Lie"	February 25, 2018
95	8	"Bait And Switch"	March 4, 2018
96	9	"Nothing To Hide"	March 11, 2018
97	10	"Over The Edge"	March 18, 2018
98	11	"The Hunt Begins"	March 25, 2018
99	12	"Collision Course"	April 1, 2018

=== Season 11 (2018) ===
No. overall	No. in season	Title	Original release date
100	1	"Wild Rescues"	August 5, 2018
101	2	"Hunting Season"	August 12, 2018
102	3	"Schoolyard Bear"	August 19, 2018
103	4	"No Trespassing"	August 26, 2018
104	5	"Turkey Trouble"	September 2, 2018
105	6	"Spring Training"	September 9, 2018
106	7	"Don't Feed The Bears"	September 16, 2018
107	8	"Coastal Criminals"	September 23, 2018
108	9	"Under The Radar"	September 30, 2018
109	10	"Shakedown"	September 30, 2018
110	11	"Fatal Attraction"	October 7, 2018
111	12	"Boiling Point"	October 14, 2018

=== Season 12 (2019) ===
No. overall	No. in season	Title	Original release date
112	1	"Midsummer Mayhem"	February 19, 2019
113	2	"Stranded And Abandoned"	February 26, 2019
114	3	"Invisible Evidence"	March 5, 2019
115	4	"The Fast and the Curious"	March 12, 2019
116	5	"A Test of Strength"	March 19, 2019
117	6	"Hit and Run"	March 26, 2019
118	7	"Triple Threat"	April 2, 2019
119	8	"Decoy Detail"	April 9, 2019
120	9	"Rules of the Game"	April 16, 2019
121	10	"Dawn Patrol"	April 23, 2019
122	11	"Winter is Coming"	April 30, 2019

=== Season 13 (2019) ===
No. overall	No. in season	Title	Original release date
123	1	"Wild Winter"	July 21, 2019
124	2	"Frozen Over"	July 28, 2019
125	3	"Treacherous Trails"	August 4, 2019
126	4	"Snow Way Out"	August 11, 2019
127	5	"In the Thick of It"	August 18, 2019
128	6	"Last Days of Winter"	August 24, 2019
129	7	"Circle of Life"	August 31, 2019
130	8	"On the Loose"	September 7, 2019
131	9	"Riverside Stakeout"	September 14, 2019
132	10	"Good News, Bad News"	September 21, 2019

=== Season 14 (2020) ===
No. overall	No. in season	Title	Original release date
133	1	"Running Out of Time"	April 26, 2020
134	2	"Out of Options"	May 3, 2020
135	3	"Needle in a Haystack"	May 10, 2020
136	4	"Bump in the Road"	May 17, 2020
137	5	"Case Closed"	May 24, 2020
138	6	"Leading the Way"	May 31, 2020
139	7	"Raccoon Rescue"	June 7, 2020
140	8	"Twists and Turns"	June 14, 2020
141	9	"No Place Like Home"	June 21, 2020

=== Season 15 (2020) ===
No. overall	No. in season	Title	Original release date
142	1	"Mountaintop Mystery"	October 11, 2020
143	2	"Cliff Face Crisis"	October 25, 2020
144	3	"Trail Blazers"	November 1, 2020
145	4	"Moose in the City"	November 8, 2020
146	5	"Cracking a Cold Case"	November 15, 2020
147	6	"Stubborn as a Moose"	November 22, 2020
148	7	"Taking the Bait"	November 29, 2020
149	8	"Trail Blazers"	December 6, 2020
150	9	"Trapped"	December 13, 2020
151	10	"Cat and Mouse"	December 20, 2020
152	11	"Backseat Bear"	December 27, 2020

=== Season 16 (2021) ===
No. overall	No. in season	Title	Original release date
153	1	"Hidden in the Water"	June 20, 2021
154	2	"Bobcat on the Loose"	June 27, 2021
155	3	"Meltdown"	July 18, 2021
156	4	"Snow Patrol"	July 25, 2021
157	5	"Don't Tread on Me"	August 1, 2021
158	6	"Abandoned"	August 8, 2021
159	7	"Grave Danger"	August 15, 2021
160	8	"Call in the Cavalry"	August 22, 2021
161	9	"Raccoon Rodeo"	August 29, 2021
162	10	"Dangerous Consequences"	September 12, 2021
163	11	"Squirrel Showdown"	September 19, 2021
164	12	"Officer Down"	September 26, 2021

=== Special episodes ===
Season	Title	Original air date
5	"Unwarranted Waste"	September 20, 2015
6	"Wardens vs. Poachers"	December 20, 2015
6	"Wardens vs. The Elements"	June 19, 2016
8	"Protect and Preserve: Alligator Showdown"	September 10, 2017
8	"Protect and Preserve: Hunting the Hunters"	September 17, 2017
8	"Protect and Preserve: Manhunt"	September 24, 2017
8	"Protect and Preserve: No Way Out"	October 1, 2017
8	"Protect and Preserve: Into Thin Air"	October 8, 2017
13	"Dynamic Duos"	July 21, 2019
