= The Firefly (Fringe) =

- Fringe episode
- Episode no.: Season 3 Episode 10
- Directed by: Charles Beeson
- Written by: J. H. Wyman; Jeff Pinkner
- Production code: 3X6110
- Original air date: January 21, 2011

Guest appearances
- Christopher Lloyd as Roscoe Joyce; Michael Cerveris as The Observer; Nick Ouellette as Bobby Joyce; Eugene Lipinski as December; David Quinlan as Joe; Olivia Cheng as Victoria DiMiri; Marci T. House as Pam

Episode chronology
← Previous "Marionette"	Next → "Reciprocity"
- Fringe season 3

"The Firefly" is the 10th episode of the third season of the American science fiction drama television series Fringe, and the 53rd episode overall. The episode centers on a chain of events created by Walter's crossing over into the parallel universe in 1985 that has had subtle but significant effects in the present. Christopher Lloyd guest-starred as retired rocker Roscoe Joyce.

As the first episode in its new Friday time slot, "The Firefly" aired on January 21, 2011, in the United States to 4.88 million viewers, outperforming the previous episode "Marionette" Thursday night viewership by 18%. Time shifted viewership added 42% in its ratings. It received generally positive reviews, with many praising the storyline as "elegant" and "beautiful."

== Plot ==
The Fringe team is brought to a nursing home, where Roscoe Joyce (Christopher Lloyd), the former keyboardist of the band Violet Sedan Chair, was seen talking to his son Bobby (Nick Ouellette) who had died in 1985, as well as evidence of an Observer. Walter Bishop (John Noble), meeting his musical hero, requests to take Roscoe back to his lab to help Roscoe remember what his son said. Walter is able to help Roscoe remember much of his past since the loss of his son through therapy that includes helping Roscoe to recall his piano-playing skills. Roscoe shortly recalls the conversation with his son, which was actually a message from the Observer September to Walter. September (Michael Cerveris) soon appears at the lab and requests to speak to Walter.

As they walk, September reminds Walter of the damage he did when he brought Peter from the parallel universe. September recounts the events of one such chain: in the prime universe, three months after Walter's crossing, Peter (Joshua Jackson) captured a firefly which set into motion a chain of events that eventually led to the death of a pedestrian in a car accident (Walter brought over Peter, Peter caught a firefly, a little girl nearby didn't catch that same firefly, she wandered away, her father drove around looking for her, he hit the pedestrian). September mysteriously departs when Walter answers a telephone call, but not before leaving him with a message: "give him the keys and save the girl." Later, Walter returns Roscoe to the nursing home. Roscoe thanks him and explains that the recent events reminded him of the last phone call he had with his son, where Bobby said he had dreamed of meeting Roscoe in a nursing home in the future. Roscoe is remorseful that Bobby died shortly after that call when a car struck him while crossing the street, which led to the breakup of the band. Because of the date and place of the accident, Walter realizes that Roscoe's son was the pedestrian previously mentioned by September.

Unbeknownst to the Fringe team, September has engineered several events in the last few days, including stopping an armed robbery to help the asthmatic female employee (Olivia Cheng) recover from an asthma attack, taking her inhaler. When Walter hears of this witness, he requests Peter and Agent Olivia Dunham (Anna Torv) to bring her to his lab, believing her to be related to the Observer's warning. Minutes from the lab, September rams the car in which the woman is being transported, initiating another asthma attack. September races from the scene, prompting Peter to follow him in Walter's car, requesting Walter to "give me the keys and save the girl." Walter realizes that September has been orchestrating the events leading up to this point and urges Peter not to go, believing that following the advice of the Observer might lead to Peter's death. Walter eventually relents and returns to help the woman, creating a makeshift inhaler before emergency help arrives. Meanwhile, Peter and Olivia follow the Observer to a rooftop. Peter corners September, who says "It must be very difficult, being a father", before he shoots Peter with an energy blast that knocks him off his feet. Olivia arrives in time to give chase to the Observer but September disappears from an adjacent rooftop.

While Walter and Agent Astrid Farnsworth (Jasika Nicole) ensure that the witness is safe at the hospital, Olivia takes Peter back to the lab. Peter, suffering from a headache, takes an aspirin and drinks out of what he believes to be an ordinary bottle of milk from the fridge. In reality, the milk contains a serum developed by Walter in order to help him recover his full mental function. However, the serum was incorrectly prepared, which causes Peter to begin convulsing. Over the phone, Walter directs Olivia to inject Peter with the correct compounds in order to save his life. Walter realizes that the serum would have killed him if he had consumed it, and that this was another step in the Observer's plot. Later that evening, September meets with another Observer, and identifies the fact that Walter was able to let Peter go, despite believing that he may not survive, and that when the time comes, they can expect Walter to do it again.

In a side plot, Olivia and Peter attempt to reorganize their relationship after Olivia receives a book (If You Meet The Buddha On The Road, Kill Him! by Sheldon Kopp) from Peter that he had originally ordered for Olivia's doppelgänger from the parallel universe.

== Production ==
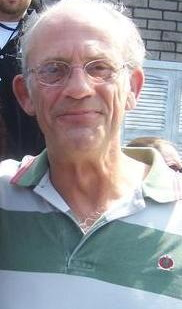
Christopher Lloyd was cast for one episode as a musical hero of Walter's in "The Firefly".

"The Firefly" was co-written by co-showrunners J.H. Wyman and Jeff Pinkner, while being directed by Supernatural veteran Charles Beeson. On October 20, 2010, TV Guide announced that Back to the Future star Christopher Lloyd had been cast in an upcoming episode as "Walter's musical hero". Noble explained Lloyd's role: "We all know how much Walter loves music, right? Well this fellow was one of his icons. He adored this man. So Walter gets to be a bit of a fanboy". Lloyd began shooting the episode in late October. Soon before the episode aired, Lloyd told reporters "I was very excited for this role. My character is going through an experience he never expected to happen to him, and he's adjusting to that." Lloyd also added he felt welcomed in as a part of the ensemble cast. In a conference call interview with journalists, John Noble explained that "probably the best fun that I've had [on Fringe] was doing the stuff with Chris Lloyd, because it was two crazy old guys just trying desperately to communicate with each other. We had a lot of laughs. There was a common thread of trying to find the music again, because Chris' character had forgotten how to play the piano, so we go through this journey of bringing the music back to him, and [it's a] thrill to Walter. This happens all the way through this very complicated episode".

The band name of Lloyd's character Roscoe Joyce, "Violet Sedan Chair," is a fictional band that Walter Bishop had mentioned the previous season, in the episode "Grey Matters". J.J. Abrams had also named-dropped the fictional band two years earlier in an issue of Wired for which he had guest-edited, alluding to the band's album, Seven Suns, recorded in the 1970s. Several months prior to the broadcast of "The Firefly", a number of vinyl records of Seven Suns were shipped to a select number of independent record stores across the United States, which have been discovered by some people. The album does contain twelve songs in the style of psychedelic and folk. The album itself has been briefly shown in the series.

As with other Fringe episodes, Fox released a science lesson plan in collaboration with Science Olympiad for grade school children, focusing on the science seen in "The Firefly", with the intention of having "students learn about pharmacology and the interactions that occur between a living organism and chemicals that affect normal or abnormal biochemical functions."

== Cultural references ==
Walter explains that the red and blue sunglasses he uses in order to see Roscoe Joyce's aura were sent to him by his friend, Doctor Jacoby from Washington State. This is a reference to the television series Twin Peaks, set in Washington State where Doctor Lawrence Jacoby is the local psychiatrist who also owns a pair of the same sunglasses. Reviewers also contrasted the casting of Christopher Lloyd, better known for his role of the scientist "Doc" Brown from the Back to the Future trilogy which took place in 1985, to that of a character involved with time travel involving the year 1985. Some journalists have speculated that the episode's title was in reference to Joss Whedon's Firefly series, which while critically acclaimed was cancelled mid-season after being scheduled in the Friday night death slot. However, though "The Firefly" was the first Fringe episode to be first aired in the new Friday night slot, the producer had already selected the title of the episode prior to the Fox Network rescheduling.

== Reception ==
=== Ratings ===
In November 2010, Fox announced that Fringe was being moved to Friday nights as a part of the network's midseason overhaul, to air after the fourth season of their reality series Kitchen Nightmares. The move meant that Fringe would be airing against Supernatural, a show with a similar science fiction genre, though this competition did not begin until Fringe's third Friday episode "Concentrate and Ask Again". Fox's popular reality series American Idol took Fringe's timeslot, as it was shifted a day later to Wednesdays and Thursdays. Executive producer J.H. Wyman stated in an interview that they were excited and believed Friday nights are "open territory that can be conquered... [We believe] we can actually deliver like The X-Files did. ... I think we both agree it's a good opportunity". Wyman elaborated that the show's high DVR numbers proved that though fans were watching the show, they did not want to do so on Thursdays. Co-executive producer Jeff Pinkner felt that if the show "can build a fan base on and carve out some territory on Friday night, we can be there for years".

The episode was originally going to air on January 28 until it was moved to a week earlier, on January 21 behind the season premiere of Kitchen Nightmares. "The Firefly" was the first Fringe episode to broadcast in its Friday slot, and many journalists considered the pending viewership numbers critical for the future of the show. The episode was the most watched show of the night, earning a 1.9/6 share or about 4.88 million viewers in the 18–49 age group. This figure was slightly higher than the average viewership for Fringe in the first half of the 2010-2011 television season, and 18% higher than the previous episode, "Marionette". When time shifted viewership over the following three days is considered, the episode received a 42% ratings increase with a 2.7 rating share, and within 7 days after its airing, reported a total of 6.7 million viewers with 2.8 rating, representing a 37% increase from the live broadcast. Fringe and its lead-in show, Kitchen Nightmares, resulted in Fox's highest rated Friday night with entertainment programs since 2008.

=== Reviews ===
"The Firefly" was well received by critics who considered the episode to be backed by a strong script. Ken Tucker of Entertainment Weekly considered "The Firefly" as one of the series' "finest episodes", calling on the show's many qualities:

The pull of family; the knotty complexity of romance; the way sci-fi can provide fresh metaphors for the most frequently explored ideas and emotions; the way we encounter humor and surprise even in the midst of anguish and regret — this is the stuff of which Fringe is made.

— Ken Tucker, Entertainment Weekly

The A.V. Club's Zack Handlen rated the episode an "A" in considering the "elegance" of the complicated Rube Goldberg-like plot, and praised the "beautiful, beautiful writing" in the reveal of the connection between Walter's actions and Roscoe's loss. Time's James Poniewozik also enjoyed the elegant plot, calling the episode "an impressive outing for the series to welcome back its fans with"; Poniewozik also appreciated John Noble's performance as he "made Walter's regret, and the toll it has taken, real—while also pulling off an amusing turn as an overawed, elderly rock fanboy".

Andrew Hanson of the Los Angeles Times, though somewhat confused to the cause-and-effect of the Observer's plot, he still found the show enjoyable, and called it "the Fringe version of the butterfly effect", a trope often used in other shows to show the impact of small changes in the characters' lives. IGN's Ramsey Isler gave the episode a rating of 7.5/10, stating that was "an important part of the setup for the second half of the season" with strong character development, but felt the pacing was slow and needed more action. Television Without Pity graded the episode a "B+". The A.V. Club staff highlighted the episode in their review of the best television shows of 2011.

=== Awards and nomination ===
At the 63rd Primetime Emmy Awards, John Noble submitted "The Firefly", along with "Entrada" and "The Day We Died", for consideration in the Outstanding Supporting Actor in a Drama Series category, but did not receive a nomination.
