= New York City Subway in popular culture =

References to the New York City Subway in popular culture are prevalent, as it is a common element in many New Yorkers' lives.

== By service ==
=== 6 ===
- Justin Townes Earle's song "Working for the MTA" describes the 6 train from the perspective of the driver.
- In the novel The Taking of Pelham One Two Three and the films based on it, a 6 train that originated in Pelham Bay Park Station was hijacked, and hostages were held inside a subway car.
- After his first visit to NYC in 1969, Rubén Blades wrote the song "El número seis" about waiting for the 6 train. He never recorded it, but it was recorded in 1975 by Bobby Rodríguez y la Compañía in 1975, Los Soneros del Barrio in 1999, and Jimmy Sabater with Son Boricua in 2002.
- When she was growing up, Jennifer Lopez regularly rode a 6 train into Manhattan to go to her dance studio. Her debut 1999 album is called On the 6, a reference to the train.

=== A ===
- "Take the A Train" is a jazz standard by Billy Strayhorn, referring to the A train, going at that time from eastern Brooklyn up into Harlem and northern Manhattan, using the express tracks in Manhattan. It became the signature tune of Duke Ellington and often opened the shows of Ella Fitzgerald. Part of the significance of this is sociological: it connected the two largest Black neighborhoods in New York City, Harlem and Bedford-Stuyvesant.
  - The A-Train series of Japanese railroad management games is named after this song. The original Japanese title translates to "Take the A Train".
- "Cinderella & The "A" Train" is a song by Joe Purdy, and is one of several songs by Purdy about (or with references to) New York City.

=== C ===
A satirical depiction of the C Eighth Avenue Local appears in a full page "Sketchbook" in The New Yorker by cartoonist Roz Chast, titled "The Legend of the C Train."

=== D ===
- The opening track on Yoko Ono's 2009 album Between My Head And The Sky is titled "Waiting For The D Train". The D passes through 72nd Street (opposite Yoko's apartment in the Dakota Building) but never stops there, as it is a local station.
- The 1980s folk-pop trio The Washington Squares includes a song titled "D Train" on their eponymous 1987 debut album.
- Jean-Michel Basquiat generated much interest in his graffiti art, which took the form of spray-painted aphorisms that were targeted at the D train.

=== F ===
- Lofi hip hop artist Samsa references the F train running from Brooklyn to Jamaica, Queens in his song "to the girl three seats over on the f train."

=== J/Z ===
- Rapper Jay Z has acknowledged that his moniker is partially a homage to the J/Z services, which stop at Marcy Avenue, near his childhood home in Marcy Houses.

=== R (RR) ===
- The 1977 film Saturday Night Fever shows several clips of the subway, most notably Tony's ride on the RR train.

== By medium ==
=== Comic books ===
- In Tales of the Night Watchman #3 and #4, published by So What? Press, the story "The Dwellers of Big Bogie" takes place predominantly in the subway. A group of spider-like humanoids called Dwellers live in a cave beneath the L train in Williamsburg. It was written by Dave Kelly and illustrated by Amanda Scurti. In #3, Serena is mugged by a Dweller named Taryn while waiting for a train. In #4, Nora chases Taryn into the cave and is captured by its rulers, the maniacal Vera and her husband, the eponymous Big Bogie.
- In 2018, Dave Kelly and Simon Fraser began serializing a Tales of the Night Watchman strip in the Park Slope Reader, a local Brooklyn paper. The first story, "The Ghost Train", is about the elevated train involved in the infamous Malbone Street Wreck returning to terrorize the city on the centenary of the accident. The story debuted in the paper's Spring 2018 edition, number 64.

=== Music ===
- The Arthur Gilespie 1912 song "The Subway Glide" was a popular dance piece.
- The jazz standard "Take the A Train", composed by Billy Strayhorn the 1940s, was named for and inspired by the then-new A train.
- The Velvet Underground used a painting of an old Times Square subway station entrance with pink smoke coming out of it for the cover of their 1970 release, Loaded.
- The Bee Gees recorded the song "Subway" for their 1976 album Children of the World.
- Jennifer Lopez's 1999 album was called On the 6, named after the 6 train that she regularly rode while growing up in the Bronx on her way to dance practices in Manhattan, prior to her stardom.
- The 1999 video for Macy Gray's video "I Try" shows Gray entering the Lexington Avenue / 53rd Street subway entrance, which at the time served the 6, E and F trains. Her train is depicted arriving on at 63rd Street.
- The 1999 music video of "I Knew I Loved You" by Savage Garden used the same set as the Seinfeld episode "The Subway".
- The music videos for both "Bad" and "Fat" take place at the Hoyt–Schermerhorn Streets station.
- The 1990 music video for "Just to Get a Rep" by Gang Starr features the elevated Marcy Avenue subway station.
- The 1990 music video for "Product of the Environment" by 3rd Bass shows MC Serch dancing around at the Far Rockaway–Mott Avenue station.

=== Television ===
- The subway has a fictional station on Sesame Street. It also has appeared in some closing sequences of the series.
- The second half of the 1974 The Odd Couple episode "The Subway Story" takes place in a subway train. The episode was filmed on a set.
- The entire All in the Family episode "Mike The Pacifist" (which aired in 1977) takes place on a subway train. A set was constructed at Television City in Hollywood, which resembled the interior of a subway train traveling toward Queens.
- In the 1987–1989 American television series Beauty and the Beast, Vincent (the "Beast"), who lived in tunnels beneath the city (see "Mole People"), rode on top of a subway car to travel surreptitiously around the city.
- In the 1992 Seinfeld episode "The Subway", a subway ride leads to four unique experiences. Jerry Seinfeld befriends an overweight nudist, George Costanza meets an attractive woman who invites him to her hotel room, Elaine Benes misses a lesbian wedding, and Cosmo Kramer wins a horse bet.
- In the 1993 Full House episode "Subterranean Graduation Blues", the entire family rides the subway to Jesse's graduation ceremony. Exterior shots of trains pulling in and out of stations are of the New York City Subway, but the episode takes place in San Francisco.
- The fourth episode of the second season of Courage the Cowardly Dog titled Courage in the Big Stinkin' City features Courage boarding the A train and being chased by a police officer. The train’s operator is scared off the train, which speeds out of control with Courage attempting to steer it, until it crashes into Radio City Music Hall’s rehearsal room.
- The first season of the Disney Channel sitcom Girl Meets World often contains episodes with scenes mimicking Bleecker Street (IRT Lexington Avenue Line). The show is actually filmed at Los Angeles Center Studios.
- The seventh episode of The Defenders sees Matt Murdock, Jessica Jones and Luke Cage use the subway to travel to Midland Circle Financial after escaping police custody, however the scenes themselves were actually shot on the PATH train.
- The TV show Forever uses the subways in three different plots. The pilot features an investigation into a subway train crash which kills 15 people and protagonist Dr. Henry Morgan. In "Fountain of Youth", Abe tracks one of the NYPD's suspects through the system, prompting Henry and NYPD Detective Jo Martinez to follow him. In "The Last Death of Henry Morgan", Henry and Adam confront each other in one of the abandoned tunnels, which leads to Henry's death, Adam being stabbed in the neck with a needle filled with air, and Jo finding an old photograph which shows Henry appearing unchanged since it was taken.
- The second season of Russian Doll features main character Nadia Vulvokov being transmitted to the past and back through the 6 Train. In later episodes, Alan takes the same train and ends up in East Berlin.
- The Scooby Doo and Scrappy Doo Show's final episode "The Ransom of Scooby Chief" shows Scrappy and his childhood pals finding a "Y" token in a storm drain, and enttering a subway entrance marked "6th Avenue-Concourse-Brighton Express", and then disguising as a single man use the token to walk through the turnstile on one fare (and past a sign for "B D F KK" on the wall) and evade a cop as they escape on a "BB" train.

=== Film ===
The New York City Subway has been featured prominently in many films.

- One of the subway's first color appearances is the 1949 musical On the Town, shot on location. One of the characters takes a fancy to "Miss Turnstiles", a "typical rider" whose picture appears in many different poses on advertising placards.
- In Pickup on South Street (1953), Richard Widmark steals Jean Peters' wallet in a subway train in the opening sequence and finds himself in a lot of trouble for doing it.
- The 1966 counterculture film You're a Big Boy Now contains a scene where Peter Kastner reads some racist graffiti in a subway station.
- The 1967 film The Incident (which starred Beau Bridges) takes place on a subway train along the IRT Jerome Avenue Line in the Bronx.
- The 1969 film Midnight Cowboy featured surrealistic pastiche scenes of Dustin Hoffman on the New York subway.
- In the 1971 film The French Connection, the subway and car chase on and underneath the elevated BMT West End Line is often considered one of the greatest chase scenes in film history. It was shot without permits. The platform at Grand Central of the 42nd Street Shuttle was also extensively used for a scene.
- The Woody Allen film Bananas (also 1971) has a scene in which Woody's character Fielding Melish confronts two muggers (one played by a pre-fame Sylvester Stallone) assaulting an old lady by tossing them off the train. As with the above example, this scene was shot on 42nd Street Shuttle at Grand Central.
- The 1974 film Death Wish has a few scenes on various lines of the NYC Subway in which the character of Paul Kersey (played by Charles Bronson) gets to practice vigilantism.
- The 1974 film The Taking of Pelham One Two Three centers on the hijacking of a southbound 6 train. The time of the movie led to the MTA avoiding 1:23 as a departure time for Pelham trains. The film was remade in 1998 and 2009.
- The 1977 film Saturday Night Fever shows several clips of the subway, most notably Tony's ride on the RR train and several of his walks underneath the West End El. All of the clips show trains covered in graffiti, which was a major problem in the subway at the time the movie was filmed.
- The 1979 cult film The Warriors focuses on a street gang taking the subway from upper Bronx to Coney Island. The film's heavily graffitied cars contrast starkly with today's relatively clean subway system.
- In the 1984 film Beat Street, Kenny, his younger brother Lee, and their friends Tracy, Ramon (Ramo), and Luis, are seen hanging out in the subway system, spray-painting an abandoned subway platform. Ramo's rival, Spit, a rogue graffiti artist is also in the subway system defacing Ramo's artwork as well as the artwork of other graffiti artists by tagging his name all over it. The gang took the subway to the Roxy, a dance nightclub. A dance battle between Lee and his break-dancing team and the New York City Breakers breaks out near the subway exit. Ramo, along with Kenny is later shown painting an all white painted subway train he vowed to tag one night when after painting one side of the car and working on the second side, they catch Spit tagging his name on Ramo's recently finished work. A chase ensues leading to an altercation between Ramo and Spit on the roadbed and ended with Ramo and Spit electrocuted on the electrified third rail.
- In the climactic scene of 1986 film Crocodile Dundee, Sue follows Mick to a subway station. There, she cannot reach him through the crowd on the platform, but has members of the crowd relay her message to him, whereupon he walks to her on the heads and raised hands of the jubilant crowd and embraces her.
- The 1988 film Coming to America features the Hoyt–Schermerhorn Streets subway station but it is actually Sutphin Boulevard subway station in Queens instead.
- Friday the 13th Part VIII: Jason Takes Manhattan from 1989 includes scenes with main villain Jason Voorhees on the subway.
- The IND Culver Line, particularly the Bergen Street station, features prominently in the opening of the 1990 film Jacob's Ladder.
- In the 1990 drama Ghost, Patrick Swayze encounters Vincent Schiavelli, a "subway ghost" who has haunted several trains in the system since being pushed onto the tracks while alive. All the scenes were filmed on the unused lower level at 42nd Street – Port Authority Bus Terminal.
- Glengarry Glen Ross (1992) is set in Sheepshead Bay, Brooklyn and has the D train as a scene-setting device.
- Just Another Girl on the I.R.T. (1992) is set in Brooklyn and features scenes filmed on the IRT Lexington Avenue Line.
- The 1995 film Die Hard with a Vengeance features Simon Gruber (Jeremy Irons) planting a bomb on a 3 train in order to blow up the Wall Street station.
- The 1995 film Money Train takes place in the subway system, with Wesley Snipes, Woody Harrelson, and Jennifer Lopez playing New York City Transit Police officers. The main plot of the film dealt with a plan to hijack the NYCT revenue collection train. The train scenes were filmed in Los Angeles on a specially constructed replica of the New York City Subway system on an old railroad yard adjacent to Chinatown known as "The Cornfield."
- Much of the 1997 film Mimic is set inside an abandoned subway station.
- In 1997, HBO held a contest wherein New Yorkers were encouraged to send in stories about their experiences on the system to be part of a documentary. The documentary, Subway Stories: Tales from the Underground, included over ten stories featuring performances by actors such as Denis Leary, Steve Zahn, Jerry Stiller, Gregory Hines, and Rosie Perez (who also helped to produce).
- In the 2000 Adam Sandler comedy Little Nicky, the subway below Grand Central Terminal possesses a portal to hell. At one point, Sandler's character saves girlfriend Patricia Arquette from an oncoming train by throwing himself onto the tracks in her place; upon dying, he finds himself in heaven.
- The Yards (2000) revolves around private subway and commuter railroad contractors and corruption. Several scenes in rail yards are present and Mark Wahlberg rides the 6 train.
- In 2001, the producers of the drama Don't Say a Word, starring Michael Douglas and Brittany Murphy, converted the abandoned Lower Bay subway station platform in Toronto to a station similar to Canal Street.
- The 2002 film Men in Black II featured an alien entering a tunnel. Once there, it attacks and devours most of a subway train (which is a combination of R32 and R38 cars) until Agent J destroys it. He is then seen walking out of the station, 81st Street – Museum of Natural History.
- The main character of the 2003 television film Homeless to Harvard: The Liz Murray Story lives in the subway.
- In 2004, Spider-Man 2 featured a fight and crash scene between Spider-Man and Doctor Octopus on an out-of-control elevated R train in Manhattan. As the R is not elevated on any portion of the line in real life, the sequence was actually filmed on the Chicago 'L' with a train of repainted 2200 Series cars (except for a short sequence where Spider-Man is dragged along Broadway at street level, which was filmed beneath the viaduct transporting the IRT Broadway-Seventh Avenue Line across Manhattan Valley).
- The 2005 film Little Manhattan shows Gabe and Rosemary riding from 72nd Street to Christopher Street along the IRT Broadway–Seventh Avenue Line. Also, Gabe wears a 3 train T-shirt during parts of the film.
- The 2005 DreamWorks Animation animated film Madagascar where Alex the lion, Gloria the hippopotamus, Melman the giraffe escaping from Central Park Zoo and they are riding the 4 train from 59th Street station to Grand Central-42nd Street station to chase after Marty the zebra in Grand Central Terminal.
- The 2007 film The Brave One features a scene where Erica shoots and kills two men on the subway after they attacked the other passengers in the car and took a teenager's iPod. The scene was filmed on the unused express tracks at Church Avenue.
- In the 2009 film Knowing, a major collision occurs between a 6 and a 4 train at Lafayette Street station.
- In the 2013 film Inside Llewyn Davis, Llewyn enters the 96th Street Station and rides an R32 train to Downtown. In a later scene, he talks on a pay phone at an elevated station platform when an R62A 7 train enters on the other side. Both scenes are historically inaccurate as the film is set in 1961 and the R32s and R62As did not enter service until 1964 and 1985, respectively.
- In the 2015 film Love Live! The School Idol Movie, Honoka enters 14th Street - Union Square Station and gets separated from her friends by getting on the wrong train which takes her to Times Square - 42nd Street.
- In the 2025 film Highest 2 Lowest, David King goes to Brooklyn's Borough Hall subway stop, and gets on a train to Yankee Stadium as part of an elaborate ransom drop off. Later in the movie, King chases the antagonist Yung Felon on a train bound from 161st street.

=== Video games ===
- The subway system appears in True Crime: New York City. In the game, the player can ride the subway for a small fee.
- The subway appears in Grand Theft Auto III & Grand Theft Auto IV as the Liberty City Transport Authority subway.

=== Other ===
- Series of baseball games between New York City teams are referred to as Subway Series. It is said that early 20th-century teams took the subway to their opponents' parks. The Brooklyn Dodgers played at Ebbets Field, located near the Prospect Park station on the BMT Brighton Line; the New York Giants played at the Polo Grounds, located near the 155th Street station of the IRT Ninth Avenue Line and the 155th Street station of the IND Concourse Line; and the New York Yankees played at Yankee Stadium, near 161st Street station on the IRT Jerome Avenue and IND Concourse lines.
- In 1993, a 16-year-old boy named Keron Thomas, who was obsessed with the city's subway system, put on a uniform and successfully impersonated a subway motorman. For three hours, he operated an A train along its route, passengers none the wiser, until he rounded a curve too fast and tripped the emergency brakes. He was caught when he was unable to reset them. He received a suspended sentence and a lot of publicity.

== See also ==
- Culture of New York City
- List of films set in New York City
