= The Last Death of Henry Morgan =

- Forever episode
- Adam, the antagonist of the series, finally neutralized by way of an air embolism.
- Episode no.: Season 1 Episode 22
- Directed by: Brad Anderson
- Written by: Matt Miller; Chris Fedak
- Production code: 4X6022
- Original air date: May 5, 2015
- Running time: 43 minutes

Guest appearances
- Jeff Biehl as Butler; Shamika Cotton as Anita; Marcus Allen Cooper as Bystander; Craig De Lorenzo as Dwayne; Angel Desai as Diane Clark; Burn Gorman as Adam/Lewis Farber; Matt Gorsky as Corky Steven; Jabari Gray as Doctor; Julia Haubner as EMT; Mike Houston as Ken; Mark Junek as Johnny Haygood; Dillon Matthews as Fight Spectator; MacKenzie Mauzy as Abigail Morgan; John Noble as Aubrey Griffin; Hannah Scott as Blair Dryden

Episode chronology
← Previous "The Night in Question"	Next → —

"The Last Death of Henry Morgan", the 22nd and final episode of the American television series Forever, first premiered in the United States on May 5, 2015 on ABC. It was written by series creator Matt Miller and Chris Fedak, and Brad Anderson directed the episode. In the episode, immortal New York City medical examiner Dr. Henry Morgan confronts his nemesis while simultaneously assisting New York City police detectives in solving the murder of a museum curator. It also tells the story of how Henry's future wife Abigail first learned that he is immortal. "The Last Death of Henry Morgan" resolved the two season-long story arcs introduced in the pilot.

John Noble was cast as a witness to the case. When the episode aired, the episode bested its own ratings from December 2014. Critically, television critics generally gave the episode positive reviews. They and the series fans both believed that the cliffhanger ending was one of the best cliffhangers of the season. The cliffhanger was never solved, since the series was canceled.

== Plot summary ==
While New York Police (NYPD) detectives Jo Martinez (Alana de la Garza) and Mike Hanson (Donnie Keshawarz) and Assistant New York City medical examiner Lucas Wahl (Joel David Moore) examine the body of a female murder victim, a museum curator who discovered a dagger, New York City medical examiner Dr. Henry Morgan (Ioan Gruffudd) and his son Abe (Judd Hirsch) hold a private funeral for the family matriarch Abigail. Henry tells Abe that he plans to seek revenge against Adam (Burn Gorman), an immortal who played a role in Abigail's death. At the morgue, Henry and Lucas find ancient iron shavings in the curator's wounds. Henry and Jo learn from the curator's boss and Aubrey Griffin (John Noble), a specialist in Roman era antiquities, that the discovered dagger was used in the assassination of Julius Caesar. Henry, suspecting that the dagger is the same one that originally killed Adam, returns to his and Abe’s antique shop. Upon hearing Adam's theory that an immortal can die by being killed by the same weapon that first killed them, Abe places the flintlock that originally killed Henry into the shop's safe and reminds his father that he is not a killer.

Hanson and Jo learn from the curator's boyfriend that a friend had the dagger. Henry and Jo arrive at the friend's apartment and find the friend bleeding to death. Henry also encounters Adam, who threatens to harm anyone who tries to stop him from obtaining the dagger. After Lucas' revelation that both victims' attacker wore nitrile gloves, Henry and Jo return to the museum. Henry follows a man resembling Adam, and Jo arrests a security guard who attacks Henry. During the guard’s questioning, Henry spikes the guard's coffee with antacid and learns that Griffin has the dagger. Henry goes to Griffin's residence and learns that Griffin, who knows that Adam is immortal, is interested in gaining immortality from the dagger. Jo finds Henry with Griffin and drives Henry home after confiscating the dagger. Henry relates the latest events to Abe and plans to steal the dagger from the precinct. At the morgue, Henry finds that Lucas, risking his career, left the dagger on Henry's desk.

Henry and Adam meet in a subway tunnel. Henry tosses the dagger onto the ground and leaves. Adam forces Henry to turn around by firing the flintlock into the air and producing a photograph of the Morgan family from 1945. Adam then fatally shoots Henry in the chest. While dying, Henry injects Adam with air, causing Adam to suffer an air embolism. Jo, who followed Henry to the tunnel, finds Henry's pocket watch while Abe watches Henry reappear in the river alive. Later, Jo arrives at the antiques shop with Henry's watch and the family photograph that Adam left at the scene. With Abe's encouragement, Henry invites Jo into the shop to hear a long story.

In the flashback, Henry and Abigail (MacKenzie Mauzy) notice each other's scars one night in 1945 London. Henry claims that a sniper shot him in the chest earlier in World War II; Abigail is reluctant to discuss the cigarette burn that her ex-boyfriend left on her neck. Henry confronts the ex-boyfriend in a pub. The ex-boyfriend fatally stabs Henry during their fight as Abigail finds Henry. Henry apologizes to her before dying and vanishing. Later, Abigail finds Henry saying goodbye to Abe in the nursery. As Henry tries to explain, she tightly embraces him.

== Production ==
=== Writing ===
During the second half of the series, Forever's writers began to resolve two storylines introduced earlier in the season. The first was Henry grieving over losing Abigail. The show's writers began to resolve the storyline concerning Abigail's disappearance over the course of several episodes at the end of the season so that a second season could begin with either the story of one of Henry's past romances or the development of a present romance for him. During "The Last Death of Henry Morgan", Miller and Fedak answered the question of how Abigail learned about Henry's secret to close the storyline for season one.

The other season-long story arc was Henry and Adam's confrontations. Toward the middle of the season, the writers planned for the story arc's resolution at the end of the season. For "The Last Death of Henry Morgan", Miller and Fedak planned for Henry and Adam to have an initial confrontation at the beginning of the episode. They wrote and filmed an action scene in which Henry prevented a subway crash that Adam attempted to cause by poisoning the subway engineer with aconite, a reminder of the case depicted in the pilot episode. While editing the episode, Miller and the editors had to cut the scene out as it affected the tone of the episode and as the writers felt that Adam should not appear until later in the episode.

The two storylines intersected in the penultimate episode of the series with Adam playing a role in Abigail's death. The writers believed that the episode's plotline suited the overall storyline better than having an aged Abigail die shortly after being reunited with Henry, an idea the writers had discussed. Miller and Fedak believed that the former served as a personal mystery for Henry and as the plot's events would force Henry to take action against Adam toward the season's end. The season finale would then serve as the revenge episode. For the method of revenge, Miller and Fedak decided against using the idea that an immortal can permanently die by being killed with the same weapon twice as the question of the permanence of Henry's immortality was a series-long story arc. Instead, they researched possible alternatives and decided that an air embolism to the brainstem which would paralyze Adam but keep him aware of his surroundings would serve as the best method of revenge. To increase the emotional stakes, Miller and Fedak wrote the scenes of Adam shooting Henry in a way that suggested that it could be Henry's final death. They even titled the episode "The Last Death of Henry Morgan" to build suspense for the episode's ending.

Miller and Forever's writers wanted to end the season with several questions answered and with an emotional cliffhanger. At the beginning of the series, Miller and the writers decided that the concept of people learning Henry's secret would serve as a series-long story arc. The idea of Jo learning about Henry's immortality had been discussed earlier in the season, but Miller and the writers decided that her lack of knowledge would serve as both the season's emotional foundation and as a source of tension throughout the season. Toward the end of the season, the writers decided that the end of the first season and the beginning of the second season would be the perfect time for Henry to reveal his immortality to another character so that it would form a storyline for the second season

=== Casting ===
John Noble was cast as Aubrey Griffin, an antiquities expert who learns of the existence of a dagger that had been used in the assassination of Julius Caesar. Although Miller had been a fan of Noble's, neither Miller nor co-writer Chris Fedak had the actor in mind when writing the episode. Suzanne Ryan, the show's casting director, however, did list him as one of several possible actors to cast in the role. Noble's scenes were filmed during his performance in a play in New York.

The character of Henry's stalker Adam, portrayed by Burn Gorman, made his fifth physical appearance in the series during the episode. Gorman voiced Adam during the first two episodes of the series. When the pilot aired, series creator Miller planned to reveal the character later in the series. In the series' sixth episode, Adam's head, hands, and feet were first seen. Adam made his first physical appearance in the episode "Skinny Dipper", which aired on December 9, 2014. The writers created a plot twist by introducing Adam as Henry's assigned therapist; Gorman used his British accent in the episode. In spite of the twist, viewers, such as TVLine's Kimberly Roots, immediately, and correctly, guessed that Gorman was Adam.

== Reception ==
"The Last Death of Henry Morgan" premiered on ABC on May 5, 2015. Over 4.1 million people viewed the episode live. Among adults 18 to 49, the episode had a 1.1 rating and a 4 share; it tied the season finale of CBS's Person of Interest and beat Person of Interest in terms of the adults 18-34 and women 18-34 demographics. In addition, "The Last Death of Henry Morgan" matched Forever's own best ratings from December 2, 2014, in adult viewers 18-49. About 2.8 additional million viewers watched the episode within 7 days, bringing the episode's total number of viewers to 6.995 million viewers.

Internationally, the episode performed very well. When "The Last Death of Henry Morgan" aired on June 16, 2015, in France, it and the previous episode averaged 6.1 million viewers, or 26.3% of the audience. The episode aired in Spain on September 2, 2015, and attracted 1.188 million viewers. It also had an audience share of 23.2%, the highest percentage of shares of the evening and late night broadcasts, which set a record for Antena 3 that evening. When the episode aired in Germany on September 28, 2015, it drew 1.98 million viewers and a 6.7 market share overall; among viewers between the ages of 14 and 49, it drew an audience of 1.07 million viewers and a 9.8 market share.

Critically, "The Last Death of Henry Morgan" generated positive reviews. In his "Critic's Corner" column, Robert Bianco of USA Today felt that the mention of Julius Caesar's assassination was unbelievable but liked the episode's ending and Noble's performance. Although Den of Geek's Billy Grifter found the condition of the dagger and the firing of the pistol unbelievable, he gave the rest of the episode a positive review, stating, "As conclusions go, Forever's finale wasn’t half bad, even though they really only gave themselves 42 minutes to wrap up lots of plot threads." Dahne, a staff writer for SpoilerTV gave the episode an A−, commenting that, as she had written her review after the series' cancellation, the cancellation was a deciding factor in grading the episode. As for the episode's storyline, she felt that the revenge storyline was more interesting than the possible revelation of Henry's immortality. Although they thought that the scene where the victim's friend was dying was disgusting and that Henry giving Adam the air embolism was cruel, Kate Aquillano, Marielou Mandle, and Pegah Rad of AfterBuzz TV generally liked the episode. Fans also liked the episode's ending. The episode's cliffhanger, Henry's possible revelation of his immortality to Jo, placed third in Entertainment Weekly's 2015 TV Season Finale Awards in the online poll's "Best Non-Romantic Cliffhanger" category; it received 14.92% of Entertainment Weekly readers' votes.
