= Barbara Eve Harris =

Canadian actress (born 1959)

- Born: Barbara Evadney Reid-Hibbert; March 8, 1959 (age 67); Tobago, Trinidad and Tobago
- Occupation: Actress
- Years active: 1985–present

Barbara Eve Harris (born Barbara Evadney Reid-Hibbert; March 8, 1959) is a Canadian actress, known for her supporting performances on television. She may be best known for her role as FBI Agent Felicia Lang on Prison Break.

== Life and career ==
Harris was born in Tobago, to Jamaican parents, and immigrated with her family to Canada at the age of six. She has made over 60 television appearances and co-starred in a number of feature films.

Harris starred in the Canadian drama series Side Effects from 1994 to 1996. For her performance on the show, she was nominated for the Gemini Award for Best Performance by an Actress in a Continuing Leading Dramatic Role. On American television she guest-starred in Knots Landing, Party of Five, The West Wing, The Practice, CSI: Miami, ER, JAG, Commander in Chief, Private Practice, Brothers & Sisters, Criminal Minds, NCIS, Rizzoli & Isles and Revenge. She also appeared in a number of made for television films, including Woman on the Run: The Lawrencia Bembenek Story (1993), Against Their Will: Women in Prison (1994), and Captive Heart: The James Mink Story (1996).

Harris had a recurring role as FBI Agent Felicia Lang in the Fox drama series Prison Break from 2006 to 2009 and later appeared in Prison Break: The Final Break. From 2011 to 2012, she had another recurring role on CSI: Crime Scene Investigation as Sheriff Sherry Liston.

In 2014, Harris was cast as Lt. Marcia Roark in the ABC drama series Forever. After ABC picked up the pilot to series, Harris was replaced by Lorraine Toussaint as the new lieutenant. From 2015 to 2017, she had a recurring role as Commander Emma Crowley in Chicago P.D. and Chicago Fire. She co-starred in the HBO miniseries Sharp Objects in 2018, and in 2020 in Netflix thriller Messiah.

In 2023 she appeared as Dot, a regional CIA director who tasked Luke and Emma to work together as a team in FUBAR starring Arnold Schwarzenegger.

== Filmography ==
=== Film ===
Year	Title	Role	Notes
1985	Night Magic	Doubt	
1993	Guilty as Sin	Kathleen Bigelow	
1997	Dead Men Can't Dance	Sergeant Rhodes	
1997	Critical Care	E.R. Nurse	
1999	Nightmare Man	Beth Pyne	
2001	Picture Claire	Patricia	
2001	Ignition	Lt. Kayla Rayne	
2002	A Time for Dancing	Dr. Conner	
2008	The Midnight Meat Train	Detective Lynn Hadley	
2012	The Amazing Spider-Man	Miss Ritter	
2012	People Like Us	Mrs. Haney	
2013	No Ordinary Hero: The SuperDeafy Movie	Principal Gwen	
2015	Welcome to Forever	Jean Raymond	Short film
2015	Born to Be Blue	Elsie Azuka	
2016	Blood Is Blood	Dr. Sprague	
2017	Double Play	Old Vera	
2017	Transformers: The Last Knight	Pentagon Colonel	
2019	The Body Remembers When the World Broke Open	Sophie	

=== Television ===
Year	Title	Role	Notes
1985	Secret Weapons	Miriam	TV film Credited as Barbara Reid-Harris
1987	Night Heat	Lillian	Episode: "Night Heat"
1987	The Magical World of Disney	Bill's mother	Episode: "The Liberators"
1987	Ghost of a Chance	Gladys	TV film
1987	Mariah	Serena Bouchard	2 episodes
1987	Nightstick	Comet Gold	TV film Credited as Barbara Harris
1987	Adderly	Viola Basinee	Episode: "Debbie Does Dishes"; Credited as Barbara Harris
1988	The Return of Ben Casey	Nurse	TV film
1989	Under the Umbrella Tree	Nancy	2 episodes
1990	Knots Landing	Lieutenant Davis	Episode: "If I Die Before I Wake"
1990–1991	E.N.G.	Barbara Cole	2 episodes
1991	Heritage Minutes	Liza	Episode: "Underground Railroad"; Credited as Barbara Harris
1991	The Hidden Room	Liz	Episode: "Wasting Away"
1991–1994	Street Legal	Rose Wilson, Lisa Hines, Patricia Wylie	3 episodes
1992	Are You Afraid of the Dark?	Sally	Episode: "The Tale of the Captured Souls"
1993	Class of '96	Miss Casper	Episode: "They Shoot Baskets, Don't They"
1993	Woman on Trial: The Lawrencia Bembenek Story	Zena Jackson	TV film
1994	TekWar: TekJustice	Thalia McKenzie	TV film
1994	Against Their Will	Captain Williamson	TV film
1994–1996	Side Effects	Wanda Gibbs	Main role, 29 episodes
1995	Sirens	Diane	Episode: "Redemption"
1996	Captive Heart: The James Mink Story	Biddy Shad	TV film
1996	Jack Reed: Death and Vengeance	Mrs. Silvera	TV film
1997	F/X: The Series	Dr. Mohler	Episode: "Gemini"
1997	The Absolute Truth	Ellen Williams	TV film
1997	In His Father's Shoes	Janice	TV film
1998	Blood on Her Hands	District Attorney Jackson	TV film
1998	Due South	Agent Handler	Episode: "Dead Men Don't Throw Rice"
1998	The Outer Limits	Colonel Samantha Elliot	Episode: "Phobos Rising"
1999	36 Hours to Die	Barbara Woods	TV film
1999	Justice	Janet Walker	TV film
1999	Party of Five	Mary Anne Grey	2 episodes
2000	Bull	Mrs. Peterson	Episode: "Love's Labors Lost"
2001	The West Wing	Gretchen Tyler	Episode: "Barlet's Third State of the Union"
2001	That's Life	Irene Boyd	Episode: "Mr. Wrong"
2001	Providence	Dr. Beth Timmons	Episode: "Meet Joe Connelly"
2001	Any Day Now	Dr. Mandelberg	Episode: "Everyone Deserves to Be Loved"
2002	Family Law	Dr. Shauna Morton	Episode: "Arlene's Choice"
2002	The Practice	Judge Joan Limpert	Episode: "Manifest Necessity"
2002	The Agency	Marilyn	Episode: "Home Grown"
2003	CSI: Miami	Danetta Harris	Episode: "Bunk"
2003	ER	Mrs. Kendrick, Sakina	3 episodes
2003	Cold Case	Diane Washington	Episode: "The Runner"
2004	Jack & Bobby	Mrs. Frankel	2 episodes
2004	JAG	Lieutenant Commander Vera McCool	Episodes: "Take It Like a Man" & "The Four Percent Solution"
2004	Sex Traffic	Audrey Dupoint	2 episodes
2005	The Eleventh Hour	Heather Andrews/Kate Washington	Episode: "In Another Life"
2005	Kevin Hill	Nora Banks	Episode: "Occupational Hazard"
2005–2006	Commander in Chief	Lynn	2 episodes
2006	10.5: Apocalypse	Stacy Warner	2 episodes
2006–2009	Prison Break	FBI Agent Felicia Lang	Recurring role, 19 episodes
2007	Eureka	Reverend Harper	Episode: "God Is in the Details"
2007	Private Practice	Melinda Stinson	Episode: "In Which Sam Receives an Unexpected Visitor"
2007	Brothers & Sisters	Carla Brown	Episode: "Domestic Issues"
2008	Boston Legal	Principal Holliston	Episode: "Rescue Me"
2008	Criminal Minds	District Attorney Eve Alexander	Episode: "The Crossing"
2008	Ghost Whisperer	Nurse Dorothy Perry	Episode: "Bloodline"
2009	Da Kink in My Hair	Chandra	Episode: "Black Cake, White Cake"
2009	Hawthorne	Karen	Episode: "All the Wrong Places"
2009	Mental	Eileen Burditt	Episode: "Coda"
2010	Tangled	Barb	TV film
2011	Flashpoint	Dr. Roberta Fenton	Episode: "Collateral Damage"
2011–2012	CSI: Crime Scene Investigation	Sheriff Sherry Liston	Recurring role, 5 episodes
2012–2014	Rizzoli & Isles	Camille Frost	2 episodes
2013	NCIS	FAA Director Stacy Bergin	Episode: "Under the Radar"
2014	Switched at Birth	Beth Wetton	Episode: "And Life Begins Right Away"
2014	Forever	Lieutenant Marcia Roark	Episode: "Pilot"
2015	Revenge	Connie Bales	Episode: "Exposure"
2015	How to Get Away with Murder	Fiona Pruitt	2 episodes
2015–2017	Chicago P.D.	Emma Crowley	Recurring role, 16 episodes
2016	Bosch	Captain Marsha Macken	Episode: "Victim of the Night"
2016	Rogue	Miranda Randpher	Episode: "Halfway Burnt"
2016	Supernatural	Clea	Episode "We Happy Few"
2016	Poor Richard's Alamanack	Elizabeth Walker	Unaired pilot
2016–2017	Chicago Fire	Emma Crowley	3 episodes
2017	Kevin (Probably) Saves the World	Lieutenant Colonel O'Donnell	Episode: "Pilot"
2018	Her Stolen Past	Olivia	TV film
2018	The Crossing	Lydia Doyle	4 episodes
2018	Sharp Objects	Eileen Curry	Recurring role, 7 episodes
2019	Good Trouble	Barbara	Episode: "DTLA"
2019	Magnum P.I.	Lucy Akina	Episode: "Dead Inside"
2019	The Man in the High Castle	Angela	2 episodes
2019	Double Holiday	Jane Bennett	TV film
2019–2022	Station 19	Ifeya Miller	6 episodes
2020	Messiah	Katherine Bailey	Recurring role, 9 episodes
2020	Star Trek: Picard	Emmy	Episode: "The Impossible Box"
2020	The Wilds	Audrey	Recurring role, 5 episodes
2021	Law & Order: Organized Crime	Athena Davis	2 episodes
2021–2023	9-1-1: Lone Star	Denice Williams	3 episodes
2022–2023	FBI: International	Attorney General Rebecca Blair	2 episodes
2023–2025	FUBAR	Dot	Main cast
2025	High Potential	Raina Viera	Episode: "Behind the Music"
2025–2026	Fallout	Rodriguez	3 episodes
