= Olivia. In the Lab. With the Revolver. =

- Fringe episode
- Episode no.: Season 2 Episode 17
- Directed by: Brad Anderson
- Written by: Matthew Pitts
- Production code: 3X5116
- Original air date: April 8, 2010

Guest appearances
- Kevin Corrigan as Sam Weiss; Omar Metwally as James Heath; Diane Kruger as Miranda Greene (uncredited); Jamie Switch as Lloyd Becker; Catherine Barroll as Ms. Lane; Curtis Caravaggio as Ken Messing; Marie Avgeropoulos as Leah

Episode chronology
← Previous "Peter"	Next → "White Tulip"
- Fringe season 2

"Olivia. In the Lab. With the Revolver." is the 16th episode of the second season of the American science-fiction drama television series Fringe, and the 37th episode overall. In terms of production, it is the season’s sixteenth episode, "Unearthed" being held over from the first season. In the episode, Olivia (Anna Torv) investigates a man with a possible connection to her who has the lethal ability to spread cancer by touch.

The episode was written by Matthew Pitts and directed by Brad Anderson. In addition to featuring recurring guest actors Kevin Corrigan and Omar Metwally, the episode marked the only (uncredited) guest appearance from actress/model Diane Kruger. First broadcast in the United States on April 8, 2010 on Fox, "Olivia. In the Lab. With the Revolver." received generally positive reviews, with one critic praising the mixture of mythology and standalone elements for the episode.

== Plot ==
In Providence, Rhode Island, lawyer Miranda Green (Diane Kruger) takes a lunch meeting with sickly young man James Heath (Omar Metwally). While he claims to have been with her in preschool, she does not remember him. She does believe that her firm can help him against those who made him sick. Driving back to her office, Miranda spontaneously develops tumors all over her body and dies in her car.

Olivia (Anna Torv) has a sleepless night owing to her recent discovery that Peter (Joshua Jackson) was abducted from the "Over There" universe by a grief-stricken Walter (John Noble). She goes to the bowling alley, managed by Sam Weiss (Kevin Corrigan), where he tells her she is one of the best people he knows, and he is sure she will do the right thing.

In the case, it transpires that victims of attacks similar to Miranda Green’s have been connected to the Cortexiphan trials in Jacksonville, Florida. Olivia visits Nina Sharp (Blair Brown) at Massive Dynamic's headquarters and demands a full list of the subjects, knowing she herself is one of them. Nina claims not to have any such list. They also discuss Peter, and Nina guesses that Olivia is looking for a reason not to tell him.

Heath confronts Olivia in the hall of her apartment building. When he sees her badge, he attacks her, but Olivia fends him off with a candlestick. He tells her the story of how he was sick with cancer as a child, and a man visited him in the hospital, claiming he could help him fight the disease. But instead of getting better, he got worse and contagious.

At the end of the episode, Olivia has decided not to tell Peter about his origins. Walter says that he has made the opposite decision, and that the truth must be known.

== Production ==
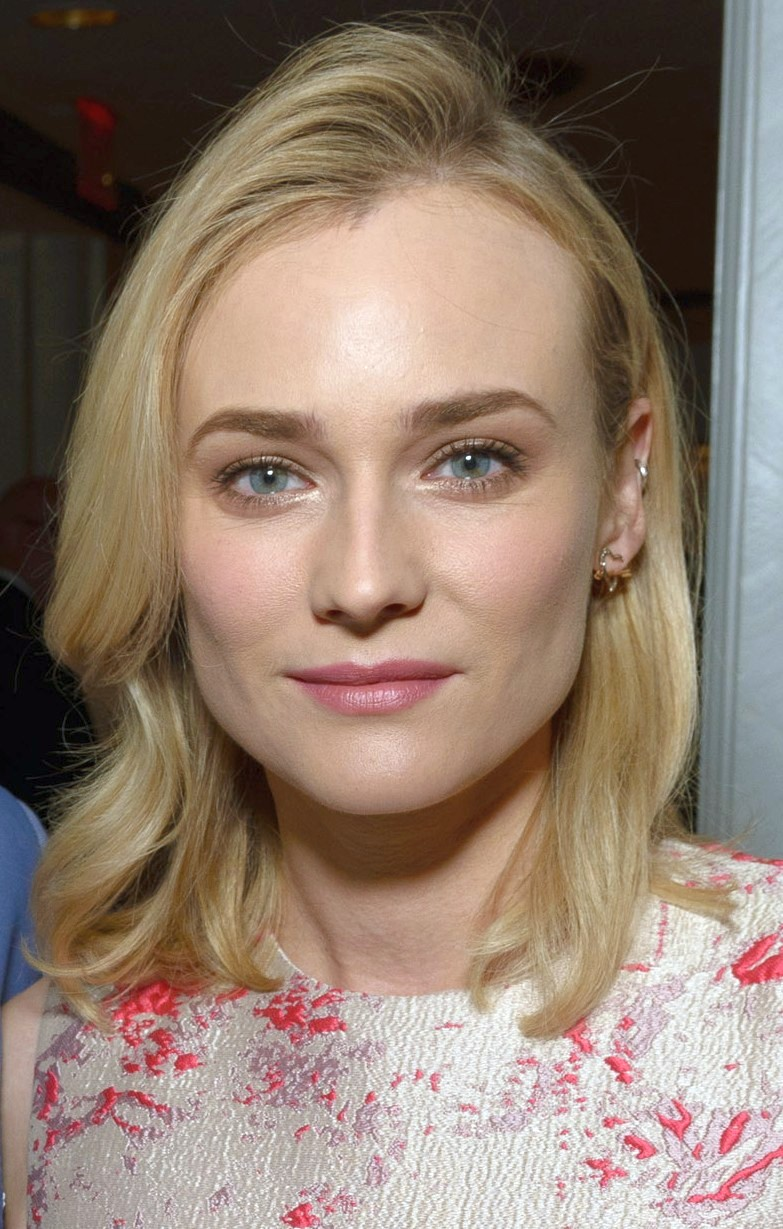
Guest actress Diane Kruger commented, "You know what? I'd love to be a gooey monster. A role where my eyes are popped out of my head or something - that would be fun."

The episode was written by production staffer Matthew Pitts, a former assistant to series co-creator J. J. Abrams, while former Fringe producer Brad Anderson served as director.

"Olivia. In the Lab. With the Revolver." featured the first guest appearances by actor Omar Metwally and German model/actress Diane Kruger. Kruger was in a relationship with star Joshua Jackson at the time, and requested that her part be as a "gooey monster", where her "eyes are popped out" of her head. Kruger's character Miranda Green became the first victim of Metwally's character James Heath, though her character died from malignant tumors on her body rather than what she commented. Metwally later made his second appearance in the first part of the second season finale, "Over There".

The episode contains a deleted scene between Broyles and Olivia discussing the James Heath case, which was available on the second season's DVD as a special feature. As with other Fringe episodes, Fox and Science Olympiad released a lesson plan for grade school children based upon the science depicted in "Olivia. In the Lab. With the Revolver."; the lesson's intention was for "students [to] learn about the science behind cancer, with a focus on the causes and prevention of skin cancer."

== Cultural references ==
The title of this episode references the board game Clue, in which players state who they think the murderer is by saying, for example, "Colonel Mustard. In the Billiard Room. With the screwdriver".

During the episode's first sequence, lawyer Miranda Greene's partner in a car-phone conversation mentions the name "Gorlomi," which was the assumed identity of Brad Pitt's character Aldo Raine in the 2009 movie Inglourious Basterds, also starring Diane Kruger.

== Reception ==
=== Ratings ===
On its initial American broadcast on April 8, 2010, the episode was watched by an estimated 6.33 million viewers. It scored a 3.9/6 rating among all households, and a 2.3/7 rating for those aged 18–49. Fringe dropped from 6.7 million to 6.1 million viewers in its second half hour, but because it aired against repeats of the normally competitive CSI: Crime Scene Investigation from CBS and ABC's Grey's Anatomy, Fringe came in second place for the night.

=== Reviews ===
The episode was viewed positively by CJ Stewart at The Celebrity Cafe, who stated "Overall, this was an exciting return to the familiar story structure that Fringe started out with, and yet it also moved along this season’s main story arch, with the writers doing an excellent job of that with plenty of references to the series’ mythos for fans to pick out. It’s always exciting when a serial drama like this throws us longtime viewers a few bones, isn’t it?" The Los Angeles Times' Andrew Hanson thought there were too many "Really"? moments, such as Olivia recalling the height notches in Jacksonville when playing a game of Clue. Hanson also believed the episode seemed too long, especially when compared to the "best episode ever" ("Peter"), which aired the previous week.

"What made 'Olivia. In The Lab. With The Revolver.' work I think was that the case-of-the-week was both creepy and relevant to the overall story."

— The A.V. Club critic Noel Murray

Writing for The A.V. Club, Noel Murray graded the episode with a B+, explaining that after the previous week's episode, "Olivia. In The Lab. With The Revolver." was a "return to normalcy". Murray appreciated the episode's use of a secret that "eats at people when they can’t bring themselves to air it out", particularly spotlighting the "look of panic" on Walter's face when Olivia and Peter leave his lab. Ken Tucker from Entertainment Weekly also appreciated the balance between mythology and single-episode elements. "This week’s episode stood up as a perfectly comprehensible hour even if you were new to the series, thanks to its medical mystery and fun side-moments such as Walter making brightly colored taffy. But is [sic] also wove in characters and names from previous episodes — Nick Lane, Nancy Lewis — and raised the tantalizing suggestion that the illness James Heath suffered from might be a malady that’s also afflicting parts of the alternate universe."

MTV columnist Josh Wigler positively noted "Mysteries of the week are always compelling when they have interplay with the overarching mythology of Fringe, which was exactly the case in tonight's installment." He also liked the "interesting dynamic" between the still-clueless Peter and the Fringe team about his unknown past. Ramsey Isler from IGN rated the episode 7.8/10; he compared it to "Peter", believing that this week's episode's had "a tough act to follow... this story definitely isn't as good, but it did keep us going along an interesting path to more answers." Isler praised Walter going back to his old jokes while at the same time possessing "an undercurrent of fear and shame in his personality as he deals with Olivia's knowledge of Peter's secret", but disliked the first half's "slow, procedural" elements as well as the cancer make-up. Despite these small critiques, Isler "liked most of this installment", expressing delight that there were a rare two mythology episodes in a row and that there were subtle references to previous episodes such as Nick Lane in "Bad Dreams". Some reviewers liked the episode title but were disappointed that more elements from the boardgame had not been incorporated into the episode.
