= Brad Anderson (director) =

American film director (born 1964)

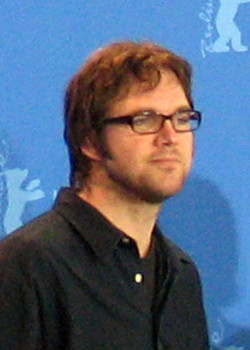
- Anderson in 2008
- Born: April 5, 1964 (age 62); Madison, Connecticut, US
- Education: London Film School
- Occupations: Film director; Producer; Writer
- Years active: 1995–present
- Known for: The Machinist; The Call
- Relatives: Holland Taylor (maternal aunt)

Brad Anderson (born April 5, 1964) is an American film director, producer and writer. A director of thriller and horror films and television projects, he is best known for directing The Machinist (2004), starring Christian Bale, psychological horror film Session 9 (2001) and The Call (2013), starring Halle Berry. He also produced and directed several episodes of the Fox science fiction series Fringe. Earlier in his career he directed the romantic comedies Next Stop Wonderland (1998) and Happy Accidents (2000).

== Biography ==
=== Early life ===
Anderson was born in Madison, Connecticut, the son of Pamela Taylor Anderson, a community services administrator. He is the nephew of Emmy Award-winning actress Holland Taylor. Before he began his film career, he attended Bowdoin College, where he majored in anthropology and Russian. He then went to London to finish his film education at London Film School before returning to Boston.

=== Film career ===
Anderson started out writing and directing the romantic comedies The Darien Gap (1996), Next Stop Wonderland (1998) and Happy Accidents (2000), all of which premiered at the Sundance Film Festival.

His next film was the 2001 psychological horror film Session 9. Unsuccessful at the box office, the film has since gained a cult following. In 2002, Anderson was a member of the dramatic jury at the Sundance Film Festival.

This was followed by his most notable work to date, The Machinist (2004), starring Christian Bale. The film became well known for Bales' dramatic weight loss (62 pounds) for the lead role, and for its screenplay, written by Scott Kosar.

His next two films were TransSiberian (2008), a thriller starring Woody Harrelson, Emily Mortimer and Ben Kingsley and the horror film Vanishing on 7th Street (2010), starring Hayden Christensen, John Leguizamo and Thandiwe Newton. Notably, both TransSiberian and The Machinist were funded by Anglo-German production companies.

At one point, he was also one of the candidates to direct the sequel to Paranormal Activity.

In 2013, Anderson directed The Call, a thriller starring Halle Berry and Abigail Breslin.

This was followed by Stonehearst Asylum (aka Eliza Graves) in 2014, with Kate Beckinsale, Jim Sturgess, David Thewlis and Ben Kingsley in the leading roles.

In 2018, Anderson directed the espionage thriller Beirut, which stars Jon Hamm and Rosamund Pike, and in 2019, he directed the Netflix thriller film Fractured, starring Sam Worthington, Lily Rabe, Stephen Tobolowsky and Adjoa Andoh, which was released on October 11.

=== Television work ===
Anderson has directed numerous episodes of Fringe, as well as two episodes each of The Wire, The Killing, and Boardwalk Empire.

Anderson was one of the contributors to the horror series Masters of Horror, directing the season two episode "Sounds Like".

Anderson directed the pilot episode of the ABC prime time series Forever.

He also directed the pilot episode of CBS's Zoo.

Anderson directed episodes of Clickbait for Netflix.

=== Future projects ===
Anderson replaced Joseph Ruben as director of Bold Films thriller Jack in May 2010, and cast John Cusack for the lead, who has since been replaced by Liev Schreiber. Anderson was supposed to direct The Living and the Dead, based on the novel of the same name by Robert Tinnell and Todd Livingston. As of 2024,"Jack" had not appeared.

After working together on The Machinist, Anderson and Christian Bale have had plans to collaborate again on an adaptation of J. G. Ballard's novel Concrete Island.

Anderson is slated to direct Peter Dinklage in the title role in an adaptation of Nobel prize winning author Pär Lagerkvist's novel The Dwarf.

== Filmography ==
=== Film ===
Documentary film

Year	Title	Director	DoP
1992	Wake Up! On the Road with a Zen Master	Yes	Yes

Short film

Year	Title	Director	Producer	Editor	DoP
1995	Frankenstein's Planet of Monsters!	Yes	Yes	Yes	Yes

Feature film

Year	Title	Director	Writer	Editor	Notes
1996	The Darien Gap	Yes	Yes	Yes	Also producer
1998	Next Stop Wonderland	Yes	Yes	Yes	
2000	Happy Accidents	Yes	Yes	Yes	
2001	Session 9	Yes	Yes	Yes	
2004	The Machinist	Yes	No	No	
2008	TransSiberian	Yes	Yes	No	
2010	Vanishing on 7th Street	Yes	No	No	
2013	The Call	Yes	No	No	
2014	Stonehearst Asylum	Yes	No	No	
2018	Beirut	Yes	No	No	
2019	Fractured	Yes	No	No	
2022	Blood	Yes	No	No	Also executive producer
2024	The Silent Hour	Yes	No	No	Also executive producer
2025	World Breaker	Yes	No	No	

=== Television ===
Year	Title	Director	Executive Producer	Episode(s)
1999	Homicide: Life on the Street	Yes	No	"Bones of Contention"
2002–2006	The Wire	Yes	No	"The Cost" "A New Day"
2003	The Shield	Yes	No	"Inferno"
2006	Masters of Horror	Yes	No	"Sounds Like"
2008	Fear Itself	Yes	No	"Spooked"
2008–2011	Fringe	Yes	Producer	"In Which We Meet Mr. Jones" "The Transformation" "Unleashed" "There's More Than One of Everything" "Night of Desirable Objects" "Olivia. In the Lab. With the Revolver." "The Plateau" "Entrada" "Immortality" "Os" "One Night in October" "And Those We've Left Behind"
2010	Rubicon	Yes	No	"A Good Day's Work"
2010	Undercovers	Yes	No	"Assassin"
2010–2011	Treme	Yes	No	"Shallow Water, Oh Mama" "Carnival Time"
2010–2011	Boardwalk Empire	Yes	No	"Belle Femme" "Battle of the Century"
2011-2012	The Killing	Yes	No	"Orpheus Descending" "Numb"
2012	Person of Interest	Yes	No	"Legacy"
2012	Alcatraz	Yes	No	"Cal Sweeney"
2013	Almost Human	Yes	Yes	"Pilot"
2014–2015	Forever	Yes	Yes	"Pilot" "The Ecstasy of Agony" "The Last Death of Henry Morgan"
2015	Zoo	Yes	Yes	"First Blood"
2016	Frequency	Yes	Yes	"Pilot"
2017–2018	The Sinner	Yes	No	"Part IV" "Part VI"
2017	The Brave	Yes	Yes	"Pilot"
2018	Titans	Yes	Yes	"Titans" "Hawk and Dove"
2019	Treadstone	Yes	No	"The Kentucky Contract" "The Bentley Lament"
2020	Lincoln Rhyme: Hunt for the Bone Collector	Yes	No	"Requiem"
2021	Debris	Yes	Yes	"Pilot"
2022	Peacemaker	Yes	No	"Stop Dragon My Heart Around"
2023-2025	Invasion	Yes	No	"The Tunnel" "Pressure Points" "Down the Rabbit Hole" "Outpost 17" "Homecoming"

Miniseries

Year	Title	Director	Executive Producer	Episodes
2021	Clickbait	Yes	No	"The Sister" "The Wife"
2022	Devil in Ohio	Yes	No	"Mother's Keeper" "Rely-upon"
2026	I Will Find You	Yes	Yes	"Episode 1" "Episode 2"
