= Pilot (Forever) =

- Forever episode
- The main character, Henry Morgan, and his inability to die.
- Episode no.: Season 1 Episode 1
- Directed by: Brad Anderson
- Written by: Matt Miller
- Production code: 276077
- Original air date: September 22, 2014

Guest appearances
- Richard Bird as African Drummer (uncredited); Mauro Bossi as Photographer (uncredited); Marko Caka as Photographer; Shamika Cotton as Anita; Michael Patrick Crane as Forensic Technician; Danny Deferrari as Andre, Jo's Man; Charles DelGatto as MTA Worker; Lou Ferguson as Old African Slave; Jack Koenig as Captain; Olga Maliouk as Russian Woman; Scott Martin as Man on Park Bench; Dillon Mathews as Bartender; MacKenzie Mauzy as Abigail Morgan; Dora Mavrakis as Actress; Rajeev Pahuja as MTA Rider; Lee Tergesen as Hans Koehler; Dominic Wergeland as Young Boy; James Zeiss as World War II Soldier (uncredited)

Episode chronology
← Previous —	Next → "Look Before You Leap"

The pilot episode of the American television series Forever premiered on September 22, 2014, on ABC. It was written by series creator Matt Miller and directed by Brad Anderson, who also served as the series executive producer. The episode introduces the characters of Dr. Henry Morgan, an immortal New York City medical examiner, his friend (and adopted son) Abe, Henry's stalker, and New York Police Department (NYPD) Detective Jo Martinez. It follows Henry and Jo as they investigate a fatal subway train accident, which Henry survives, while Henry attempts to determine the identity of his stalker, who knows about Henry's immortality. The episode shows both Henry's original death and how Henry first met his wife Abigail and Abe in flashbacks. "Pilot" introduced two season-long story arcs, Henry and Abigail's relationship and the identity of Henry's stalker, as well as several aspects of Henry's immortality.

Production occurred in New York City, with filming occurring primarily around New York's Lower East Side. Filming the scene of Henry's rebirth occurred at a university swimming pool and recreated with computer-generated imagery. ABC previewed the pilot several times before airing on network television. When the series premiere was broadcast, "Pilot" received mixed reviews with critics divided over the believability of the crime and the believability of the series' immortality aspect.

== Plot summary ==
A few minutes after Dr. Henry Morgan (Ioan Gruffudd) boards a New York City subway train, it crashes and kills everyone aboard, including Henry. Henry reemerges naked in the East River and is promptly arrested for indecent exposure. Later that day, New York Police (NYPD) detective Jo Martinez (Alana de la Garza) arrives at the crash, where she learns that investigators had determined that the engineer had died of a heart attack. She goes to the medical examiner's office, where Henry and Assistant Medical Examiner Lucas Wahl (Joel David Moore) are processing the bodies of the crash victims. Henry informs Jo that he believes that the engineer was poisoned. An anonymous phone call and an envelope containing both a photograph of Henry and his wife Abigail (MacKenzie Mauzy) dating to 1955 and a newspaper clipping about the accident convince Henry that the train accident was an elaborate plot to expose Henry's immortality. Henry wants to leave New York City after the phone call, but his friend and roommate Abe (Judd Hirsch) convinces him to stay and confront the stalker.

To determine the stalker's identity and to find the engineer's murderer, Henry and Abe test a sample of the deceased engineer's blood on Henry. Henry determines that the killer used a fast-acting form of aconite as the murder weapon. Meanwhile, Jo finds video footage of Henry boarding the train and brings him in for questioning. Henry convinces Jo that he could not be the killer by reminding her that he stated that the cause of death was poison. Later, a fingerprint Henry and Lucas found on the engineer's body leads Jo to Hans Kohler (Lee Tergesen), whose wife was killed in a subway crash involving the deceased engineer; the revelation disproves Henry's theory about the motive behind the accident.

When Henry and Jo arrive at Kohler's house, they find a large amount of monkshood plants and schematics of Grand Central Station, indicating to them that Kohler planned an attack on the station to avenge his wife's death. Kohler ambushes them on the roof and shoots Jo. Henry attempts to talk Kohler out of his plan, but Kohler fatally shoots Henry. Henry throws Kohler off the roof, killing both men. Later, Henry visits Jo in the hospital. She tells him that she thought she had seen both men fall off the roof; he denies it. Henry's stalker calls him again and reveals that the stalker is immortal also.

Three separate flashbacks occur during the episode. In the first one, Henry is shot and thrown overboard for attempting to treat a slave aboard a slave ship in 1814. The second flashback shows Henry and Abigail being photographed in 1955 and the couple discussing Henry's purpose in life. In the third one, set at the end of World War II, Henry walks up to a nurse, Abigail, who hands him an infant boy, Abe, who was rescued from a Nazi concentration camp. The scene following the third flashback reveals that Abe is Henry and Abigail's adopted son.

== Writing ==
Series creator Matt Miller developed the concept for Forever from a conversation between Miller and his five-year-old son about death. After the conversation, he began to imagine what life would be like if a person was immortal but everyone else, including that person's own children, were mortals. He then decided that the character would view immortality as a curse because of the pain of seeing family and friends die and that he would want to find a way to end his immortality. That idea informed both Miller's decision to make his character a doctor-turned-medical examiner who used his occupation for research into his immortality and Miller's decision to make the series a procedural. The details about the character's immortality, his ability to end it, and his desire to do so would serve as the series' main story arc. Miller also created a second character who shared the condition but who would be the moral opposite of his main character as a part of the worldbuilding for the series. As for the family element, Miller created a family with a 35-year-old immortal having a mortal son in his 70s. Miller stated in an interview with BuddyTV writer Catherine Cabanela that he had never seen that type of family on television before, and he believed that it provide the show with an emotional element.

To demonstrate Henry's immortality, Miller decided that Henry would die, feel the pain every time he died, and disappear during each death. Miller felt that Henry's rebirth in water would be an interesting way to keep the show's protagonist alive during the series. The idea of Henry returning to life naked completed the death and rebirth process; it also would create several comedic moments within the series. Miller intended Henry's death and rebirth process to be used sporadically after the first two episodes so that the series would focus on events during Henry's long life.

Beginning with the pilot, Miller structured each episode by telling two stories in the episode. The first was a traditional procedural plotline. The second story was a flashback from Henry's past. The flashback either related to the episode's main present-day storyline, such as Henry's involvement in investigating the Jack the Ripper case, or was a scene from Henry's backstory, such as his life in the Lower East Side's tenements in the 1890s. "Pilot" also introduced two season-long story arcs. The first one, as told through flashbacks, would be Henry's relationship with his wife Abigail, who disappeared in the 1980s. The other was another immortal's knowledge of Henry's immortality.

== Casting ==
Casting occurred over the course of one month. On February 19, 2014, Judd Hirsch was cast as Abe. When Miller and the casting department developed a list of actors for the role, they felt that Hirsch would be the best actor to portray Abe. Hirsch was the first person casting director Barbara Fiorentino asked about the role, and they sent the script to Hirsch. The series' premise, its historical aspect, and its intelligence impressed Hirsch. He also liked the idea that the audience would be seeing life through Henry's eyes.

Two days after casting Hirsch, Ioan Gruffudd was cast as Dr. Henry Morgan. Initially, the search for an actor to portray Henry was more difficult than Miller expected. Miller wanted the actors to read the script so that he could see whether the audience would believe that the man had been alive for over 200 years. Miller and Fiorentino auditioned actors from New York City, Los Angeles, Canada, London, Australia, and South Africa for the role but could not cast the role immediately. One day, Miller noticed Gruffudd in the carpool lane while they picked up their children from preschool. For Miller, Gruffudd's period work, such as in the series Horatio Hornblower, made him an obvious selection for the role. Gruffudd liked the script and felt that he could portray Henry. The story, the science fiction element, and the believability also attracted Gruffudd to the role.

Alana de la Garza was cast as NYPD Detective Jo Martinez. The show's procedural aspect, the series' serialized nature, and the believability of the world interested de la Garza. She also liked the idea that, in contrast to de la Garza's characters on other procedurals, Jo was flawed.

Fiorentino cast the last three actors on March 14, the same week that filming began. Joel David Moore was cast as assistant medical examiner Lucas Wahl, Donnie Keshawarz as NYPD Detective Hanson, and Barbara Eve Harris as NYPD Lieutenant Roark. Originally the role of Lieutenant Roark was written as a male character, but Fiorentino cast Harris in the role.

Both Miller and Fiorentino knew Moore from his previous work with both of them. Moore had met Miller when Moore guest starred on Miller's previous series Chuck. Miller pitched the pilot to Moore, and Fiorentino, a personal friend of Moore's, called him about the role. Moore liked the idea of Lucas providing comedic moments to the series. For Lucas' personality, Miller asked Moore to include several of his own personality traits when portraying the character.

Casting initially did not feel that Keshawarz could portray a NYPD detective, but his work on Homeland convinced them otherwise. For the series, the Arkansas-raised Keshawarz imitated a New York accent. As for the character's name, Hanson did not a first name the first four episodes. The writers named him "Mike" in the fifth episode "The Pugilist Break". Miller did not learn about Hanson's first name until later when Keshawarz mentioned it to him.

As for Henry's stalker Adam, Miller and Fiorentino cast Burn Gorman as Adam. Gorman voiced Adam during the first two episodes of the series. Adam made his first physical appearance in the episode "Skinny Dipper", which aired on December 9, 2014.

== Production ==
On August 15, 2013, ABC agreed with Miller and Lin Pictures to produce the pilot, and the network committed to producing the pilot on January 23, 2014. Miller recruited three writers and two editors from Chuck. On February 21, Brad Anderson was selected to direct the pilot. ABC picked up the series on May 8, 2014. In August 2014, Josh Kramon was selected to score the series.

The pilot was filmed in multiple locations on New York City's Lower East Side during the week of March 14, 2014. The crew filmed in Chinatown and an area along Delancey Street. The Earnest Sewn store on Orchard Street, which had previously been used in the Cinemax series The Knick in 2013, was used as the set for the antique shop. When ABC picked up Forever, the crew leased the Louis Zuflacht building on Stanton Street and used it as the sets for the shop and for Henry and Abe's apartment. The cast and crew also filmed in Grand Central Station.

=== Effects ===
In the script, Miller had written that Henry always returned to life in the Hudson River. Anderson, however, suggested that East River had a more cinematic view, and Miller changed the location because Anderson's assessment. Gruffudd and the crew filmed the rebirth scene against a green screen in a university swimming pool due to the strength of the East River's current. The crew later covered Gruffudd with water. During editing, the producers superimposed the film of Gruffudd's swim in the pool with film of the East River to give the illusion that the scene occurred in the river.

=== Previews ===
ABC showed "Pilot" several times before the network premiere of Forever. ABC screened the pilot at the CMA Music Festival block party on June 6 and 7, 2014, in Nashville, Tennessee. The episode was also previewed at the Paley Center for Media during the 2014 PaleyFest Fall TV Previews on September 6, 2014, in New York City and on September 11, 2014, in Los Angeles. ABC also released "Pilot" on August 26 for Hulu Plus subscribers and on ABC.com. During the Upfronts for the 2014-2015 television season, "Pilot" generated 231,646 posts on social media.

=== Network premiere ===
On July 15, 2014, the network announced that the pilot would air on September 22 as a part of a two-night premiere. "Pilot" premiered on ABC on September 22, 2014. Over 8.6 million viewers watched the episode live. Among adults 18-49, it had a 1.7 rating and a 5 share. The episode beat CBS's Under the Dome by 1.2 million total viewers. "Pilot" also retained a larger percentage of total viewers and of adults 18-49 from its lead-in than Castle's premiere on March 9, 2009; Castle kept 47% of total viewers and 49% of adults 18-49 while Forever kept 67% of total viewers and 77% of adults 18-49.

== Reception ==
Critically, "Pilot" received mixed reviews. Although Paul Dailly of TV Fanatic thought that the crime felt "forced", he called the characters and the premise "exciting" and stated that he enjoyed the episode. USA Today's Robert Bianco gave "Pilot" three out of four stars, claiming that the premise had been well-plotted but the crime was not interesting. Verne Gay of Newsday believed that the show's stars would appeal to the audience more than the series' plot device. Michael Landweber of PopMatters felt that the immortality aspect of the show was more interesting than the case and that the flashback to Henry and Abe's connection was very emotional. San Francisco Gate's David Wiegand called "Pilot" "ambitious" but felt that, in spite of the believability of the crime, the episode was unbelievable.

"Pilot" also performed very well in international ratings. When it premiered in France on April 28, 2015, it drew about 7.08 million viewers. When Forever premiered on Spain's Antena 3 on July 15, 2015, about 2,316,000 viewers watched "Pilot", making it the highest-rated primetime series for the night for the channel. In addition, the character of Doctor Henry Morgan trended on Twitter as the third most-discussed topic of the night. Many users compared Henry to Jordi Hurtado, the host of Saber y ganar whose appearance seemed to have been unchanged over the series' run. In Germany, "Pilot" and the second episode premiered on July 20, 2015, and drew average of 2.02 million viewers and a 7.3 percent market share; among viewers between the ages of 14 and 49, they had 1.13 million viewers and an 11.3 percent market share.
