= Phoebe Forrester =

Fictional character

- The Bold and the Beautiful character
- MacKenzie Mauzy as Phoebe Forrester
- Portrayed by: Brynne McNabb (2002–2003); Chandler Mella (2004); Keaton Nicole Tyndall (2004–2005); Addison Hoover (2005–2006); MacKenzie Mauzy (2006–2008); (and other child actors)
- Duration: 1999–2008
- First appearance: Episode 3136; September 21, 1999
- Last appearance: Episode 5456; December 9, 2008
- Created by: Bradley Bell
In-universe information
- Occupation: Student (2006–07); Model at Forrester Originals (2007–08); Singer (2007–08)
- Family: Marone; Forrester
- Father: Ridge Forrester
- Mother: Taylor Hayes
- Stepmother: Brooke Logan
- Brothers: Thomas Forrester
- Sisters: Steffy Forrester
- Half-brothers: R.J. Forrester
- Grandfathers: Massimo Marone; Jack Hamilton
- Grandmothers: Stephanie Forrester; Sharon Ashford Hamilton
- Uncles: Thorne Forrester; Zachary Hamilton; Nick Marone; Marcus Forrester (adoptive); Rick Forrester (legal)
- Aunts: Angela Forrester; Kristen Forrester; Felicia Forrester; Diana Carter; Bridget Forrester (legal)
- Nephews: Douglas Forrester; Hayes Forrester Finnegan
- Nieces: Kelly Spencer
- First cousins: Aly Forrester; Zende Forrester Dominguez (adoptive); Dino Damiano

Phoebe Forrester is a fictional character from the CBS Daytime soap opera The Bold and the Beautiful. The first actress to play the character on a contract basis was Addison Hoover, who joined the show in April 2005 and left the following year. From July 11, 2006 to December 9, 2008, Phoebe was played by MacKenzie Mauzy, until the character was killed off. Phoebe and her twin sister, Steffy (Jacqueline MacInnes Wood), were born in September 1999 to Ridge Forrester (Ronn Moss) and Taylor Hayes (Hunter Tylo). As a result of constant SORASing, Phoebe was seventeen by 2006. The character has been described as an "ill-fated beauty".

== Creation ==
=== Casting ===
After being played by a range of child actors, Brynne McNabb began portraying Phoebe in January 2002, and departed in August 2003. Chandler Mella took over from January to March 2004, followed by Keaton Tyndall from April to December 2004. Addison Hoover played the role from April to September 2005. Phoebe has been aged multiple times; first in January 2002, when she was aged to 6. In 2004, she was aged to pre-teen, and by 2006 was nearly 20 years old. Mauzy relocated to Los Angeles to be on The Bold and the Beautiful. In May 2008, Steffy, who had been out of town since December 2006 was re-cast with Jacqueline MacInnes Wood; the character was re-written as fraternal twins. On July 3, 2008, it was announced that Mauzy was now on a recurring status, as the actress had been cast in the Broadway production of A Tale of Two Cities. Her last appearance was on December 9, 2008, when the character was killed off.

=== Development ===
Phoebe had a major romance with Rick Forrester (Kyle Lowder), her legal uncle, although they are not blood related. At the time of the storyline, Mauzy was just 18 years old. Lowder stated that she was "so mature for her age", and that off-screen the actors did not feel "awkward" as they formed a bond which translated well on-screen. Prior to Rick, Phoebe had a brief attraction to Shane McGrath (Dax Griffin). Mauzy observed that the writers initially had Phoebe "so creeped out by him, but now, she's turning around and falling in love with him", a switch she called "fun" and "a challenge to figure out" as an actor.

Mauzy and co-star Lowder are both singers off-screen, which prompted executive producer Bradley Bell to have both sing on the soap. Speaking of how this came about, Mauzy said, "It kind of evolved. I think I talked to Brad about having done theater in the past. One day, he called me and asked, 'Do you want to start singing on the show?' I said, 'Absolutely!'" In August 2007, former American Idol contestant Constantine Maroulis was cast as record promoter Constantine Parros on the show, with Phoebe as his protege. On the website for his company Boldface Records, he and Phoebe post a duet they recorded together, and another duet she recorded with now ex-boyfriend Rick, asking viewers to select their favorite. The series aired a special concert with Constantine, Phoebe, Rick, and recording artists Elliott Yamin and Jon McLaughlin. Maroulis told People "[My character] becomes sort of fixated on Phoebe" who is "beautiful and young and very, very talented". Mauzy said that Maroulis' character "adds such a great dimension to the show", and described filming Phoebe and Rick's duet as "the ultimate form of expression, because you're really putting yourself out there". The actress found that shooting the concert before a live audience was "a different energy" from where the soap is usually filmed, in a studio.

== Storylines ==
=== 1998–2006 ===
Phoebe and her twin, Steffy, were born onscreen on September 21, 1998, to Ridge Forrester (Ron Moss) and Dr. Taylor Forrester (Hunter Tylo). Taylor nearly died giving birth to them after suffering from tuberculosis. Steffy was named after her grandmother, Stephanie Forrester (Susan Flannery). In February 2001, Ridge and Taylor took the twins and Thomas to Saint Thomas, where they renewed their wedding vows. The family, along with the babysitter Catherine, then took a boat trip, and two-year-old Steffy fell overboard during stormy weather and was presumed eaten by sharks. However, Steffy turned up weeks later at Morgan DeWitt's house. Morgan, an old flame of Ridge's who desperately wanted to have his child, had kidnapped her and was holding her captive. Taylor grew suspicious of Morgan and was shocked to discover Steffy in her house. As Taylor was about to take her daughter home, Morgan returned and held them both captive. Ridge eventually saved his wife and child by driving his car through Morgan's house as she was about to shoot Taylor. Morgan was eventually committed to a psychiatric institution. Family problems continued to spiral when Taylor was presumed dead after being shot by Sheila Carter (Kimberlin Brown), Steffy and her siblings wanted Bridget Forrester to live with them and raise them. Instead, Ridge married Brooke Logan a woman he had been involved with and engaged to prior to meeting Taylor. A new addition, R.J Forrester was added to their family when Brooke and Ridge had their first child together before Ridge and Brooke married. Years later, Taylor was revealed to be alive and Ridge and Taylor renewed vows. The following year, they split up due to Taylor revealing the truth about her sleeping with a man named James in 1993. Phoebe believed that her older brother Thomas' (Drew Tyler Bell) relationship with illegal immigrant Gaby Moreno (Shanelle Workman) was what divided Ridge and Taylor, and informed Taylor that the two had sex, knowing that this would cause Taylor to have Gaby deported. Taylor did call the immigration department, but was unsuccessful in convincing them to deport Gaby. After Taylor's second death from a gunshot wound, Brooke and Ridge married and she moved in with the family. Later Phoebe and Steffy chose to go to boarding school to gain more of their own independence.

=== 2006–2008 ===
On July 11, 2006, Phoebe returned to Los Angeles to see her family, and explained that Steffy had opted to stay in London, where they were on vacation. As she was driving home one night she got a flat tire. Her aunt, Darla (Schae Harrison), arrived to help her fix it. While strenuously pulling, Darla was jolted back onto the road and run down by a drunken Taylor who was coming to Phoebe's rescue. This resulted in Darla's death. Phoebe, Hector Ramirez (Lorenzo Lamas), and Phoebe's grandmother Stephanie all conspired to keep Taylor's part in Darla's death a secret. Phoebe being the emotional twin, feared losing her mother again and begged for her mother to remain silent which Taylor gladly went along with. Phoebe had taken a liking to gardener Shane McGrath (Dax Griffin), who was a witness to Darla's accident. However, there has been a growing attraction between Phoebe and Rick (Kyle Lowder) since his return from Europe. It has been explained that Phoebe and Rick are technically not related, as Phoebe's father Ridge is the son of Massimo Marone and not Eric Forrester while Rick's father is Eric. The Forresters are strongly opposed to the growing relationship between Rick and Phoebe.

Phoebe's recent friendship with singer Constantine Parros has caused some friction between her and Rick. Constantine, who saw her and Rick singing in a video posted by Rick's friend C.J. Garrison offered for them to join his label, Boldface Records, but Rick declines while Phoebe agrees, much to Rick's dismay. Rick believes that Constantine has an "ulterior motive" to his relationship with Phoebe and is determined to find out what he can all while he hides his affair with Ashley Abbott. Rick and Constantine make a bet, to which Phoebe reluctantly agrees, that they will both sing at C.J's cafe Insomnia with Phoebe. The flirtatious and complicated triangle between Phoebe, Rick, and Constantine continues. Eventually Constantine 'moves on' with Rick's half-sister Felicia, ending the love triangle between them and Phoebe. For a while, Rick and Phoebe were happy, despite the disapproval from both of their families, but then Phoebe was devastated when she discovered Rick had slept with Ashley so she broke things off.

About a year later Phoebe suddenly says she still has feelings for Rick, but Rick has fallen in love with her mother Taylor. Phoebe then went to Australia, unaware of Rick and Taylor's feelings. Meanwhile in L.A., Taylor told Rick that she loved him. When Phoebe returned, she walked in her mothers room and saw Rick and Taylor kissing on the bed. After seeing how upset Phoebe was Taylor broke it off with Rick because her love for her daughter was more important to her than her love for Rick. Then later Phoebe calmed down and told her mother and Rick (in front of Brooke and Ridge) that she would not stand in the way of their love because she understood how being in love felt. Brooke was very upset and ordered Taylor to stay out of her son's life.

Phoebe left to tour with a band but returned to Los Angeles to attend her father's upcoming wedding to Brooke Logan. She told her mother that she stayed away on tour and promoting Forrester Creations's new fragrance "Phoebe" because she didn't want to see her mother and Rick together. Phoebe talked with Steffy about Rick's recent antics toward their father. What she didn't expect to hear was her sister's confession that Rick had recently kissed her, against Steffy's will. Extremely furious, Phoebe told Steffy she had to make a stop before going to Ridge and Brooke's wedding rehearsal party. Hurt, angry and immaturely thinking that Rick had used her, her mother, then her sister Phoebe argued with Rick in his office at Forrester Creations then followed him to his car to continue the argument. She told Rick to pull over but he refused wanting to get to the rehearsal and away from Phoebe as quickly as possible. Phoebe commence to pummel Rick furiously yelling and screaming causing it to be hard for him to control the car. She also unknowingly placed her foot atop his on the accelerator flooring the gas which led to a very bad car crash. After the accident, Rick very injured, in pain, and dizzy from a head injury managed to walk to Eric's house for help. He encountered Ridge in front of the house trying to call Phoebe and got him to help. Ridge went with Rick to the site of the accident and found a barely conscious Phoebe. As he called to her she woke up and began to sing the song she wrote for Ridge and Brooke's wedding then died in her father's arms. Ridge screams out in horror at the site of Phoebe's death, and her family mourns her. Rick is initially blamed for the crash, but evidence later comes to light that Phoebe was attacking Rick when he lost control of the car. In 2019, Steffy names her adoptive daughter after Phoebe, although ends up giving her up after it transpires that she is the stolen baby of Liam Spencer and Hope Logan.

== Reception ==
In 2007, Soap Opera Digest named Mauzy their annual "Hottest Newcomer" on soaps, noting that she had been "thrown into heavy story right away" upon her casting. Soap Opera Digest also placed Phoebe's exit on their list of the six saddest deaths from The Bold and the Beautiful. Chris Eades from Soaps In Depth believed that Phoebe had a "dramatic history" and added that despite the character's death, Phoebe "will continue to live on in the hearts of those who still love her".
