= Forever (2014 TV series) =

American fantasy crime drama TV series

- Genre: Fantasy; Crime drama; Medical drama
- Created by: Matthew Miller
- Starring: Ioan Gruffudd; Alana de la Garza; Joel David Moore; Donnie Keshawarz; Lorraine Toussaint; Judd Hirsch
- Composer: Josh Kramon
- Country of origin: United States
- Original language: English
- No. of seasons: 1
- No. of episodes: 22

Production
- Executive producers: Matt Miller; Jennifer Gwartz; Dan Lin; Chris Fedak
- Running time: 42 minutes
- Production companies: Good Session; Lin Pictures; Warner Bros. Television

Original release
- Network: ABC
- Release: September 22, 2014 – May 5, 2015

Forever is an American fantasy crime drama television series that aired on ABC as part of the 2014–15 fall television season. Created by Matthew Miller, it centers on the character of Dr. Henry Morgan, an immortal New York City medical examiner who uses his extensive knowledge to assist the New York City Police Department (NYPD) in solving crimes and to discover a way to end his immortality. Flashbacks within each episode reveal various details of Henry's life.

The series' network aired a sneak preview on September 22, 2014, and resumed the series at 10 p.m. ET on September 23, 2014. Reception of the series was mixed. In the United States, television critics were divided over the series' similarity to other crime dramas and its premise. In contrast, voters in several online polls ranked the series as one of the best of the television season. Forever's broadcast was well received in France and Spain.

Although ABC gave the series a full-season episode order on November 7, 2014, it cancelled Forever after one season citing the show's low ratings. Television critics believed that other factors explained the network's decision, as the show gained viewers who watched up to seven days later on their DVRs. Fans of the series reacted strongly, creating a social media campaign to save the series; despite these efforts, the series remains canceled.

== Premise ==
Dr. Henry Morgan (Ioan Gruffudd) is a New York City medical examiner who studies the dead for criminal cases, and to solve the mystery of his own immortality.

His first death was 200 years ago while trying to treat a slave as a doctor aboard a ship in the African slave trade; one of the ship's owners becomes frustrated with the time and effort Henry is putting into this and orders him to stop, shooting Henry and throwing him overboard when he fails to comply. Each time he dies, Henry disappears almost immediately and returns to life naked in a nearby body of water, the only sign of injury being a scar at the site of his original gunshot wound from long ago. He has also stopped aging. Henry's long life has given him broad knowledge and remarkable observation skills which impress most people he encounters, including New York Police Department Detective Jo Martinez (Alana de la Garza). Only antiquarian Abe (Judd Hirsch), whom Henry and his now-deceased wife Abigail found as a newborn in a German concentration camp during World War II and adopted as their son, knows that he is immortal.

Henry is stalked by "Adam", who is also an immortal, and claims to have been alive for around 2,000 years.

== Cast and characters ==
=== Main ===
- Ioan Gruffudd as Doctor Henry Morgan:

Born in 1779, Henry is a New York City medical examiner who studies the dead for criminal cases and to solve the mystery of his immortality. His first death was in 1814 while trying to free slaves as a doctor aboard a ship in the African slave trade in the Caribbean. Since that time, Henry disappears each time he dies and returns to life naked in a nearby body of water. He has been married twice; his first wife Nora, whom he married before he became immortal, had him committed to an asylum, and his second wife, Abigail, whom he met during the Second World War and remained with until 1984, when she left to find somewhere they could be together without being judged for Abigail's apparently greater age. He abandoned his original career as a doctor in 1956 after he and a butcher were shot; Henry chose to crawl away and die instead of trying to save the other man because he feared others finding out his secret. Although knowledgeable about many topics, Henry demonstrates a general lack of knowledge about modern popular culture. He also dislikes cell phones but will use one if necessary.

- Alana de la Garza as Detective Jo Martinez:

Jo is a sharp, no-nonsense, determined detective with the NYPD who is both intrigued and disgusted by Henry's detailed medical knowledge when examining a corpse. She finds his behavior to be "out there", but still relies on his insight for solving homicides. Originating from a rough background with a law-breaking father, she is also a recent widow; her husband was a lawyer who died of an unexpected heart attack while running on a treadmill on a visit to Washington a year before she met Henry. She is stationed at the 11th Precinct.

- Joel David Moore as Lucas Wahl:

Henry's assistant in the Medical Examiner's office, who expresses uncertainty about how little he knows about his boss, and an uncanny memory for his daily activities. He studied film in college before working in the medical examiner's office. He makes horror films in his spare time; in the episode, "The Last Death of Henry Morgan", Lucas confesses to using the morgue as a set for several of his movies. Lucas tends to use popular culture references in his speech, many of which Henry does not understand.

- Donnie Keshawarz as Detective Mike Hanson:

Jo's partner, who is stationed at the 11th Precinct. He was in a band when he was younger, a characteristic added at the request of AfterBuzz TV hosts Kate Aquillano, Marielou Mandl, and Pegah Rad and of fans of the series who watched the after show. He is married and has two sons. He also has a brother. During an earlier interview with AfterBuzz TV, Keshawarz discussed Hanson's role as Henry's foil, namely Hanson's orthodox methodology in solving cases and knowledge accumulated over a limited lifetime contrasting with Henry's unorthodox ways and extensive knowledge gathered over a long life. This was particularly demonstrated in "The King of Columbus Circle", when both deduced that their victim had been suffering from cancer, Henry observing various tell-tale signs of chemotherapy such as stained hands and slight hair-loss while Hanson just noticed the medical alert bracelet the dead man was wearing.

- Lorraine Toussaint as Lieutenant Joanna Reece: Jo and Hanson's supervisor at the 11th Precinct.
- Judd Hirsch as Abraham "Abe" Morgan:

Henry's adopted son and main confidant. No one knows Dr. Henry Morgan better than his son, Abe. The keeper of Henry's immortality secret, although he has claimed that he worked with Henry's father to explain their association to strangers. At the end of World War II, he was rescued from Belsen, after surviving a death march from Auschwitz. He currently owns an antique store where Henry uses the basement for his immortality research on himself. Abe fought in the Vietnam War and has a two-time ex-wife named Maureen Delacroix (Jane Seymour). Abe's research into his family tree revealed that he is a distant relative of Henry's, as one of his ancestors was the illegitimate son of Henry's womanizing uncle.

=== Recurring ===
- MacKenzie Mauzy as Abigail Morgan:

Henry's second wife and Abe's adoptive mother. Henry met her toward the end of World War II, when they were working as medical personnel near a Nazi concentration camp. She worked as a nurse and raised Abe with Henry. Their relationship is depicted through flashbacks, with Janet Zarish portraying Abigail in her later years. In flashbacks set in 1982, Abigail is still married to Henry but appears considerably older than her unaging husband, creating difficulties when others mistake their relationship. She disappears in the mid-1980s, leaving Henry searching for an explanation. Her disappearance and Henry's efforts to discover her fate form an ongoing storyline. The loss leaves Henry reluctant to pursue another relationship with someone for whom he has genuine feelings. In "The Night in Question", Henry learns that Abigail had intended to reunite with him and Abe, but encountered Adam following a car crash. She killed herself to prevent Adam from discovering Henry's whereabouts.

- Burn Gorman as Lewis Farber / "Adam":

An immortal who claims to have lived for approximately 2,000 years and seeks a way to end his life permanently. He serves as Henry's adversary, initially contacting him through anonymous telephone calls. His identity is revealed as Lewis Farber, a therapist who manipulates a patient into posing as Henry's mysterious caller. Analysis of his blood reveals that he has contracted and recovered from several extinct diseases, including the bubonic plague. Adam reveals that the Nazis imprisoned and experimented on him in an attempt to understand his immortality. His experiences connect him to Abe's history as a Holocaust survivor, and he helps Abe discover information about his biological parents. He asks Henry to help locate an ancient Roman dagger taken from him by the Nazis. The dagger caused his first death and was also used in the assassination of Julius Caesar. Adam believes that the weapon responsible for an immortal's original death may also be capable of ending that person's immortality.

== Episodes ==
No.	Title	Directed by	Written by	Original release date (Note: Episodes were broadcast one day earlier in Canada. The dates listed are when episodes were broadcast on ABC in the U.S.)	Prod. code	US viewers (millions)
1	"Pilot"	Brad Anderson	Matt Miller	September 22, 2014	276077	8.26
Dr. Henry Morgan is killed by a subway train collision, and after his return from the East River underneath the Brooklyn Bridge, he is called by an unknown individual who says he saw his power of immortality. Abraham, Henry's confidant, convinces him to continue his routine until he feels he is truly compromised. Detective Jo Martinez, investigating the crash, finds footage of Morgan on the very train and suspects him of causing the accident until he proves the accident was murder by poison of the train conductor. The culprit used Aconite, a near instant and incredibly painful poison from the Monkshood flower, and is planning to use it in gas form to distribute through Grand Central Station as revenge on the train companies who were "responsible" for his wife's death on a subway track. Henry and Jo intercept the culprit atop the roof of Grand Central, where both are shot and Henry plummets from the roof of Grand Central with the murderer. After stopping the threat, Henry receives another call from the mysterious caller. Flashbacks: Initial flashbacks look at Henry's first death and his initial immortality. Later flashbacks reveal that Henry was in the U.S. Army during World War II, where he met his future wife Abigail in a field hospital in Germany. They first meet while rescuing an infant at an internment camp, who grows up to be Abraham.
2	"Look Before You Leap"	Sam Hill	Matt Miller	September 23, 2014	4X6002	6.62
A young woman who falls off a bridge is believed to have committed suicide until Morgan proves otherwise. Meanwhile, Henry receives a letter from his mystery stalker on old paper from the Italian Hotel where Henry fell in love with Abigail. In the present, the victim's professor, who was translating an ancient Latin codex with her, is the prime suspect until found dead, after being released on bail. Because the lack of evidence would exonerate the professor, and cause police to continue looking for the real killer, the professor's death was also made to look like suicide. Again, Henry proves otherwise and is saved by the police when he decides to confront the real killer. After solving the case, Henry gets a call from his stalker, now introducing himself as "Adam", to congratulate him. "Adam" claims that he shares the same immortality as Henry, that he has been alive for at least 2000 years, and that he and Henry will eventually meet in person as they have eternity together. Flashbacks: In 1945, in Italy, Henry writes a note to Abigail about his secret and how they cannot be together; Abigail pursues Henry and lets him know that she will not let him go, after which they share a kiss.
3	"Fountain of Youth"	David Warren	Janet Lin	September 30, 2014	4X6005	5.69
An elderly man dies from a youth potion that made his body younger, but caused his brain to age more quickly. Henry and Detective Martinez must race to determine the source of the potion before any more die from its effect. Flashbacks: Henry reflects on a colleague who suffered from tuberculosis in 1906, and how, then as now, people resorted to desperate measures to try to cling to life.
4	"The Art of Murder"	Jace Alexander	Chris Fedak	October 7, 2014	4X6004	5.17
Gloria Carlyle, the matriarch of a rich and powerful New York family, is found dead during a celebratory event in the museum she was a major patron of, that was organized in her honor. Henry is first reluctant to investigate the case as Gloria was pivotal in his life, having encouraged him to propose to Abigail. However, he is determined to complete the investigation after he is forced off the case by Conrad Carlyle, Gloria's son, and begins to delve into Gloria's tragic past. Flashbacks: In 1945, Henry meets a young Gloria after he and Abigail sneak into an art exhibit, Gloria's advice inspiring him to propose to Abigail.
5	"The Pugilist Break"	John T. Kretchmer	Phil Klemmer	October 14, 2014	4X6003	4.81
Henry and Jo investigate a wealthy businessman's connection to the death of a former convict, who ran a recreation center for children in New York's inner city. Meanwhile, Abe begins suggesting Henry let go of his attachments to various artifacts in the antiques shop. Henry reflects how the same poverty and discrimination has lived on from the time he worked in the late 1890s. Flashbacks: Henry works as a doctor in the same area of the city in the 1890s, treating recent immigrants in crowded tenements. The rich owner of the tenements has Henry kicked out and beaten. Henry treats the son of a leatherworker and is given a leather doctor's bag as thanks, but is unable to save the boy.
6	"The Frustrating Thing About Psychopaths"	Zetna Fuentes	Sarah Nicole Jones	October 21, 2014	4X6006	4.95
When a human heart is delivered fresh out of a body to the homicide division, Henry and Jo end up in the middle of a Jack the Ripper copycat murder investigation. But it doesn't stop there. A second killing resembles another infamous, unsolved crime: the Black Dahlia murder. However, Henry's anonymous caller tips him to search beyond the clues of these classic killings and leads the police squad to profile a very different, yet disturbed suspect. Flashbacks: Henry is involved with the investigation of the original Jack the Ripper case. He encourages the lead detective to allow him to look for more forensic evidence.
7	"New York Kids"	Steve Shill	Zev Borow	October 28, 2014	4X6007	4.95
A young doctor is found murdered in his apartment the morning after receiving an award for the extraordinary good work he does. Henry and Jo discover a mysterious Roman Numeral tattoo on his chest and that he is from a wealthy background which he has distanced himself from for unknown reasons. Henry and Abe are reminded of secrets they themselves hold that they are not proud of, while Jo denies to her Lieutenant that she is affected by the earlier shooting, prompting the Lieutenant to share some of her own secrets. Flashbacks: In the 1950s, Henry comes to the aid of a man who was shot. When Henry himself is shot, he risks revealing his secret while trying to save the man, but eventually abandons the man and hides when other people arrive who would see him die and vanish if he stayed. This prompts Henry to abandon his career as a doctor as he feels he cannot trust himself as a physician if he can put himself above his patients.
8	"The Ecstasy of Agony"	Brad Anderson	Allen MacDonald	November 11, 2014	4X6009	4.23
Henry and Jo investigate the unusual death of a businessman. A dominatrix named Iona is an early suspect, and Henry feels a strong and mutual attraction with her. Abe is visited by his ex-wife with a tempting offer. Flashbacks: Henry remembers returning home and telling his wife, Nora, about his secret after he first became immortal. It results in Henry being taken to a mental institution.
9	"6 A.M."	Peter Lauer	Dean Carpentier & Matt Kester	November 18, 2014	4X6008	4.43
The murder of the son of jazz saxophonist Pepper Evans prompts a series of reflections on father-son relationships and an investigation into issues relating to the rights to famous jazz song "6 A.M." Flashbacks: As a boy, Abraham becomes interested in jazz music and is given lessons by a neighbor.
10	"The Man in the Killer Suit"	Jace Alexander	Cameron Litvack	December 2, 2014	4X6010	5.17
The apparent death of an English noble, engaged to a girl from a very wealthy New York family, reveals that the man was leading a double life. Abe and Henry attend the funeral of Abe's old friend Lyle, who he has not seen in over 60 years. Abe hopes to reconnect with Lyle's widow, Fawn. At the end, Henry hails a cab driven by Adam, who locks Henry in and pulls away in a cliffhanger ending. Flashbacks: Henry (in 1957) applies grey to his hair, in order to appear to age like his wife Abigail. She says she likes older men. Later, Henry is walking in the park and is accosted by an older man, who says he recognizes Henry as having been killed by an artillery shell on the beach at Normandy, when he was wounded in the leg by the same shell. Henry tells him he has the wrong man and leaves. Henry is sufficiently spooked that he and Abigail prepare to move in a hurry. His son Abe, about 12 years old, is having his friend Lyle over, and they talk about Abe's first kiss with Fawn Mahoney. Abe says he will marry her someday.
11	"Skinny Dipper"	Steve Boyum	Chris Fedak & Phil Klemmer	December 9, 2014	4X6011	5.20
A confrontation with his fellow immortal results in Henry being forced to face the possibility that he will have to reveal his immortality to his colleagues, however he manages to merely reveal he has a stalker. Henry is sent to Bellevue to see a therapist, triggering painful memories. At the end of the episode, Henry is forced to kill a murderer in self-defence after walking into a trap set by his stalker, whose true identity is revealed. Flashbacks: In 1815, Nora visits Henry at the Charing Cross Asylum after he is committed. Henry begs her to get him out, but she leaves saying they can help him there. Later, the doctor tells Henry he seems to be perfectly sane. Henry agrees and says he was not himself when he told his wife he was immortal, but has now recovered his senses. The doctor plays along but says this must not happen again, and prescribes a new scientific treatment he calls hydrotherapy. This turns out to be similar to modern water-boarding, and Henry is subjected to it while the doctors demand that he admit he still believes himself to be immortal. Henry manages to continue to deny this.
12	"The Wolves of Deep Brooklyn"	Rob Bailey	Zev Borow	January 6, 2015	4X6012	4.93
Returning to work after a break due to his recent ordeal, Henry investigates the murder of Jason Fox, a young investment banker. The discovery that the victim is the son of an old friend of Abe's, from his time in the army, prompts Abe and his friends to turn detective themselves. The investment firm where the victim worked is led by smug long-time trader Oliver Clausten (William Baldwin), who initially seems to cooperate with the investigation. However it is revealed that the firm's financial activities are actually a large Ponzi scheme, Fox found out, and Clausten subsequently killed him, involving two young employees from the firm in an attempt at cover-up. After wrapping up the case, Henry and Jo bond over their shared trauma of having killed someone in the line of duty. Flashbacks: In 1965, Henry recalls his reluctance to accept Abe's entry into the army during the Vietnam War.
13	"Diamonds Are Forever"	John T. Kretchmer	Janet Lin	January 13, 2015	4X6013	4.75
A young man is hit by a car, Jo is forced to deal with unhappy memories of her late husband, and Abe investigates a theft in his shop. Flashbacks: In 1816, Henry is transferred from Charing Cross Asylum to Southwark Prison where he meets his cellmate, a Catholic priest. After three months, Henry reveals his immortality to the priest, who assists Henry in committing suicide to allow him to escape.
14	"Hitler on the Half Shell"	David Warren	Sarah Nicole Jones	February 3, 2015	4X6014	4.39
Stolen art from Nazi Germany begins turning up, and the son of a Nazi turns out to have been quietly returning the pieces to their rightful owners. Abe deals with the lingering sadness of never knowing who his birth parents were. Abraham finally learns the names of his parents from an Auschwitz ledger given to him by Adam, who was tortured in Auschwitz by Nazi scientists researching immortality for Hitler. Flashbacks: Henry confronts his father when he learns he is involved with the slave trade (before the events that lead to Henry becoming immortal). Henry cuts all ties with his father, but reluctantly visits him on his deathbed. Henry receives his iconic watch, a family heirloom, which he can accept because it did not come from the profits of slavery.
15	"The King of Columbus Circle"	Matt Barber	Phil Klemmer	February 10, 2015	4X6015	4.62
Henry and Jo investigate the murder of an exiled king who was dying of cancer; Abe continues his research into his family tree and discovers something remarkable about his bloodline. Flashbacks: In 1955, Henry and Abigail have a delayed honeymoon aboard the Orient Express, during which they save the life of the young prince with an impromptu appendectomy.
16	"Memories of Murder"	Zetna Fuentes	Anderson Mackenzie	February 24, 2015	4X6016	4.66
A young NYU student is murdered, and it is revealed that she had been engaging in 1970s fantasy roleplay to help an older man relive memories of his late wife. The murderer turns out to be the girl's roommate, who had become obsessed with her. Iona, who has become a guest lecturer at the school, helps in the investigation and is attacked by the killer. She and Henry go out on a date, but he ultimately tells her that he cannot continue to date her because he is developing genuine feelings for her; they both acknowledge that he was badly hurt in a past relationship and is afraid to get that close to anyone again. Flashbacks: In 1982, Henry and Abigail celebrate their anniversary with a night out in New York. Abigail has aged and looks much older than Henry by this time, and she is upset that people thought he was her son or a hired escort. They dance alone together at home and remember their younger days.
17	"Social Engineering"	Antonio Negret	John Enbom	March 3, 2015	4X6017	4.40
A member of a secret "hacktivist" group called the Faceless is murdered, leading Henry and Jo into the world of cyber-terrorism; Abe remembers his days as an activist. Henry is then blackmailed by an innocent Faceless hacker, Liz, when she finds Henry's falsified records. She threatens to share these records with his co-workers unless he provides her with a fake death certificate so she can disappear; Henry tears up the certificate in front of her. While Liz is sending an email about Henry's records she is hit by a car. Later Irene, working for the cybercrime division of NYPD, sees video of Liz leaving Henry's home and investigates him, finding his false records. Henry then has to make a choice between saving Liz's life or letting her die so Irene will keep his secret. Flashbacks: Henry's first wife Nora had him committed to a mental institution in 1815 after he tried to convince her that he is immortal (reprising a scene from episode "The Ecstasy of Agony"). Many years later, in 1865, Henry is a hospital doctor and developing a relationship with a nurse, Anne. He is hailed as a hero in a newspaper for saving a young boy from a burning building. Nora, now quite old, recognizes Henry's picture in the paper, and visits him at the hospital, saying she now believes him and he must share his miracle with the world. Henry refuses to cooperate, and Nora produces a gun and attempts to shoot Henry to prove his immortality. Anne leaps in front of Henry and is killed instead. Nora is taken away.
18	"Dead Men Tell Long Tales"	Peter Lauer	Chris Fedak & Matt Kester	March 24, 2015	4X6018	4.42
Henry and Jo search for missing gold and a murderer when the owner of a treasure hunting salvage company is killed. Meanwhile, a wealthy entrepreneur pursues Jo, and Adam thinks he knows how to eliminate the curse. Henry learns the ship they are salvaging is the ship he was killed on, and finally learns that his attempt to free the slaves on board actually succeeded after he was killed. Flashbacks: In 1814 Henry is aboard his family's slave ship "Empress of Africa." He secretly meets with a slave who speaks English, and offers to bring him the key to his manacles and cage, so he can free himself and the other slaves and they can make their way to the armory. The slave says he understands. Later, Henry is about to hand the key to the slave when the captain enters the cells. The captains says a key is missing and is suspicious of Henry, telling him that he may be the owner's son, but the captain is judge and jury on the ship. Henry is called away to help a feverous slave. Later, Henry's first death is shown when the captain shoots Henry with his flintlock in the cell-block. As Henry is dragged away, the key drops from his hand where a slave can reach it.
19	"Punk is Dead"	John F. Showalter	Ildy Modrovich	March 31, 2015	4X6019	4.66
A woman's mummified body is discovered behind a wall in a famous punk club, where it has been since the 1980s. Meanwhile Jo begins to date the club's owner, though their budding relationship is complicated by the discovery of the body. Flashbacks: In the 1980s Henry's wife Abigail vanishes with little trace, leading Henry to begin an increasingly obsessive search for what happened to her. The search grows to the point where it threatens to take over his life, leading a worried Abe to get rid of his research material and tell Henry that after over a year, it is time to move on. He also suggests opening an antique store to sell some of the clutter that Henry has accumulated over his long life.
20	"Best Foot Forward"	John T. Kretchmer	Sarah Nicole Jones & Zev Borow	April 7, 2015	4X6020	4.06
A ballerina's foot is discovered, and they discover that this murder case is not actually a murder. Henry and Jo begin to become closer just as Abe discovers a lead on Abigail. Flashbacks: In 1929 in Paris, a sculptor friend of Henry's pushes her creative boundaries using heroin. In correlation to the present day, Henry questions how much people are willing to sacrifice to be remembered.
21	"The Night in Question"	Michael Fields	Phil Klemmer	April 21, 2015	4X6021	4.04
Henry tries to find out what really happened to Abigail after she left him, and the details of a horrifying secret are revealed. Flashbacks: In Brooklyn, 1946, Henry and Abigail enter their rented apartment after arriving from Europe after the war, with the infant Abe. Henry presents Abigail with an English rose, which he kept alive on the voyage from England on the Queen Mary. Later, Abigail reads to Henry from a book of Yeats poems, which makes an appearance in the present day.
22	"The Last Death of Henry Morgan"	Brad Anderson	Matt Miller & Chris Fedak	May 5, 2015	4X6022	4.13
A museum archivist rediscovers the dagger that first killed Adam, and is murdered. The dagger is taken in the aftermath. Working to obfuscate the existence of immortals, Henry determines that an antiquities specialist obtained the dagger to lure Adam, having learned of him from Mengele's journal. Jo and Lucas notice Henry's activities; both have heartfelt conversations with him. Adam shoots Henry with the gun that first killed him, intending for Jo to either discover Henry's corpse or witness his disappearance. Henry injects Adam with a hypodermic needle, then dies and disappears, resurrecting in the East River near Abe. Jo finds only Henry's pocket watch. Adam has escaped but is now suffering locked-in syndrome from the embolism Henry induced. Jo confronts Henry with an old photograph Adam took from Abigail's body, clearly showing Henry, Abigail, and a baby Abraham. She demands an explanation, and Abe — who had previously advised Henry that he would need a confidante after Abe's death — urges him to "tell her." Henry offers to tell Jo "a long story." Flashbacks: In London, 1945, before Henry has revealed his secret to Abigail, her abusive ex-lover fatally stabs him. Abigail is alone with him when his body vanishes. He returns home that night to say a quiet goodbye to baby Abraham, and when Abigail discovers Henry is alive she embraces him unquestioningly.

== Production ==
=== Origin ===
The concept for Forever came from a conversation between series creator Matthew Miller and his five-year-old son about death. After the conversation, Miller began to imagine what life would be like if a person was immortal but everyone else, including that person's own children, were mortals. He created a character who viewed immortality as a curse because of the pain of seeing family and friends die and who would attempt to find a way to end his immortality. That concept informed Miller's decision to make his character a doctor-turned-medical examiner who used his occupation for research into his immortality and Miller's decision to structure the series as a procedural. The details about the character's immortality and his ability and his desire to end it would serve as the series' main story arc.

Another series-long story arc explored how other people learn of Henry's immortality. The first storyline in the arc was the season's second story arc, Henry's determination to learn the identity of a second immortal who knows about it. The second immortal character's morals would contrast his protagonist's morals, serving as an antagonist for the main character. As for the family element, Miller created a family with a 35-year-old immortal having a mortal son in his 70s. Miller stated in an interview with BuddyTV writer Catherine Cabanela that he had never seen that type of family on television before, and he believed that it provide the show with an emotional element.

To demonstrate Henry's immortality, Miller decided that Henry would die and would feel the pain every time he died. Anything on Henry's body would disappear with his body during each death. Miller felt that Henry's naked rebirth in water would be an interesting way to keep the show's protagonist alive during the series by completing the death and rebirth process; the nakedness would create several comedic moments within the series. Miller intended to use Henry's death and rebirth process sporadically after the first two episodes so that the series would focus on Henry's long life.

=== Casting ===
The first person cast was Judd Hirsch as Abe. When Miller and casting director Barbara Fiorentino developed a list of actors for the role, they felt that Hirsch would be the best actor to portray Abe. Hirsch was the first person asked about the role. When they sent the script to him, Hirsch liked the series' premise, its historical aspect, its intelligence, and the idea that the audience would see life from Henry's perspective.

Two days after casting Hirsch, Ioan Gruffudd was cast as Dr. Henry Morgan. Miller wanted the actors to read the script so that he could see whether the audience would believe that the man had been alive for over 200 years. The search for an actor to portray Henry was more difficult than Miller expected. Miller and Fiorentino unsuccessfully auditioned actors from New York City, Los Angeles, Canada, London, Australia, and South Africa for the role, but the role was uncast. One day, Miller noticed Gruffudd in the carpool lane while they picked up their children from preschool. For Miller, Gruffudd's period work, such as in the series Horatio Hornblower, made him an obvious selection for the role. Gruffudd liked the script and felt that he could portray Henry. The story, the science fiction element, and the believability also attracted Gruffudd to the role.

Alana de la Garza was cast as NYPD Detective Jo Martinez. The show's procedural aspect, the series' serialized nature, and the believability of the world interested de la Garza. She also liked the idea that, in contrast to de la Garza's characters on other procedurals, Jo had flaws.

Joel David Moore, Donnie Keshawarz, and Barbara Eve Harris were the last three cast for the series. Harris was cast as NYPD Lieutenant Roark. Originally the role of Lieutenant Roark was written as a male character, but Fiorentino cast Harris in the role. Lorraine Toussaint replaced Harris after the pilot, and Toussaint's first appearance as Lieutenant Joanne Reece was in the episode "Look Before You Leap". To prepare for her role, Toussaint visited the morgue and viewed a few autopsies. The character of Lt. Reece was to play a larger role in the series, but her scenes were cut so that the episodes could fit time constraints. The DVDs include the deleted scenes.

Moore was cast as assistant medical examiner Lucas Wahl. Both Miller and Fiorentino knew Moore from his previous work with both of them. Moore and Miller met when Moore guest starred on Miller's previous series Chuck. Both Miller and Fiorentino, a personal friend of Moore's, discussed the pilot and the role with Moore. Moore liked the idea of Lucas providing comedic moments to the series. For Lucas' personality, Miller asked Moore to include several of his own personality traits when portraying Lucas.

Keshawarz as NYPD Detective Mike Hanson. The casting department initially did not feel that Keshawarz could portray a NYPD detective, but his work on Homeland convinced them otherwise. The Arkansas-raised Keshawarz imitated a New York accent for Forever. As for the character's name, the writers did not give Hanson a first name until the fifth episode "The Pugilist Break" when Jo addressed Hanson as "Mike" during a scene. Miller did not learn about the name until later when Keshawarz mentioned it to him in a conversation about the episode.

For the recurring character of Henry's stalker Adam, Miller and Fiorentino cast Burn Gorman. Gorman voiced the character during the pilot and the second episode. Adam made his first physical appearance in the episode "Skinny Dipper", which aired on December 9, 2014.

=== Writing ===
Beginning with the pilot, Miller structured each episode by telling two stories in the episode. The first was a traditional procedural plotline. The second story was a flashback from Henry's past. The flashback either related to the episode's main present-day storyline, such as Henry's involvement in investigating the Jack the Ripper case, or was a scene from Henry's backstory, such as his life in the Lower East Side's tenements in the 1890s. Both the father-son relationship between Henry and Abe and one of the two season-long story arcs, Henry's relationship with his wife Abigail, were told through flashbacks.

When planning an episode, the writers started with the idea for the episode and determined the main story arc. They discussed which plot element could be associated with a previous incident from Henry's life and how the flashbacks connected the two stories. From there, they determined Abe's viewpoint about the case or his connection to the case. Then, they planned the story on whiteboard.

One plot device used in the pilot, Henry's pocket watch, proved to be difficult to use in subsequent episodes. In the beginning, the writers would have Henry's pocket watch fall out of his pocket so that it would not disappear with the rest of his body. It became more difficult for writers to develop believable scenarios in which Henry would lose his watch, so they did not write it into the plot as frequently in later episodes.

=== Effects ===
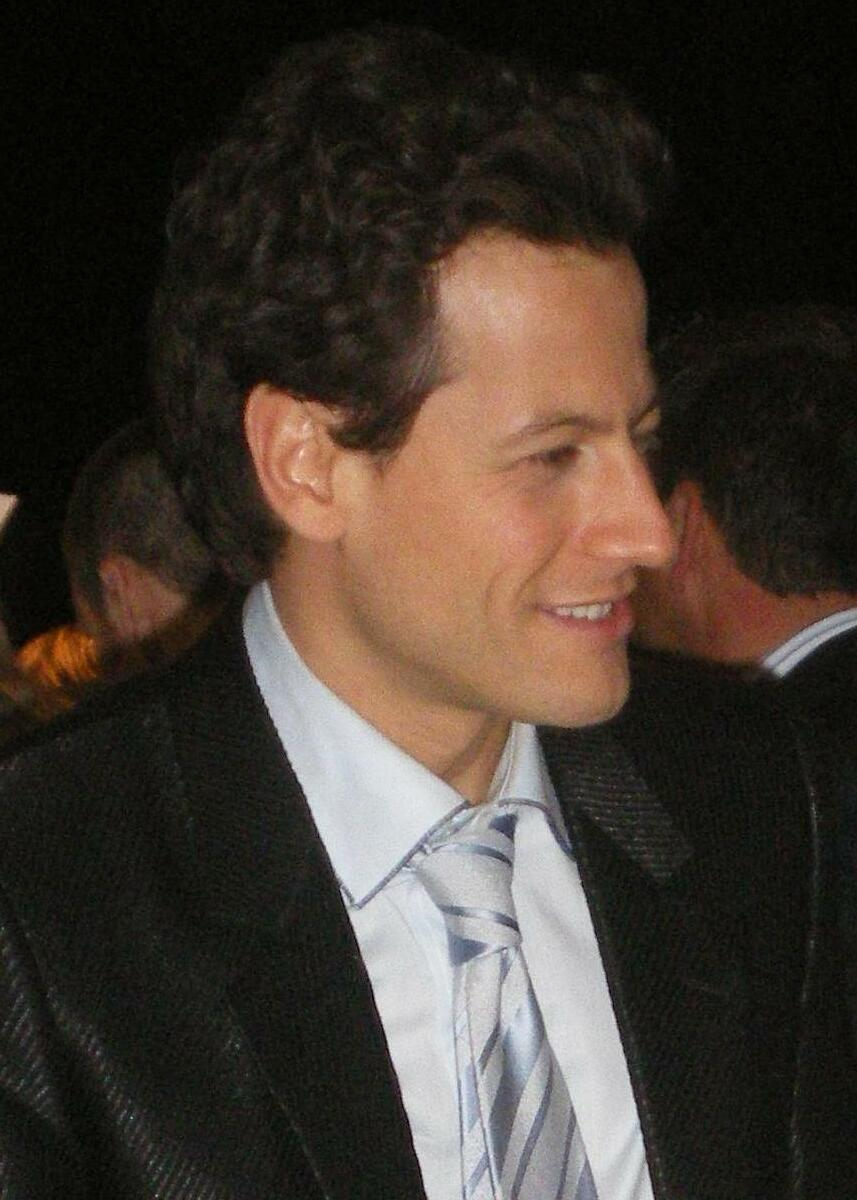
Ioan Gruffudd

Miller and the filming crew had planned to film the rebirth scenes in the pilot in several bodies of water, but they could film it in only one location. During the episode's production, Gruffudd and the crew filmed the rebirth scene against a green screen in a university swimming pool due to the strength of the East River's current. The crew later covered Gruffudd with water. To depict Henry's death in different years, the crew refilmed the scene with Gruffudd wearing various hair styles. The producers then edited the scene by superimposing the film of Gruffudd's swim in the pool with film of the East River to give the illusion that the scene occurred in the river.

=== Title dispute ===
Forever is also the title of a 2003 novel by writer Pete Hamill, with a similar premise: an Irishman is granted the gift of immortality by an African sangoma, yet must remain in Manhattan or the gift is renounced. On May 21, 2014, Warner Bros. Television received a letter from RadicalMedia requesting that the name of the series be changed. RadicalMedia stated in the letter that Miller's character, setting, and title were very similar to Hamill's. The letter also stated that Sundance Studios had begun to develop a television series based on the novel. According to Warner Bros. studio representatives, Miller never read the novel when developing Forever. Hamill did not proceed with a lawsuit and died in 2020.

== Reception ==
Forever received mixed reviews from critics in the beginning. Rotten Tomatoes gave the show a rating of 57%, based on 44 reviews, with an average rating of 5.8/10. The site's consensus stated, "Forever star Ioan Gruffudd is appealing, but his charm can't overcome the show's gimmicky, unrealized premise." Metacritic gave the show a score of 54 out of 100, based on reviews from 24 critics, indicating "mixed or average reviews". TV Guide's Matt Roush felt that the series could become a hit similar to Bones and Castle. Other critics felt that the series had issues. Zap2it.com's Sarah Huggins liked the concept for the series and Gruffudd's performance, but she felt that the first two episodes were inconsistent "in tone and story". Both Variety's Brian Lowery and Adweek's Sam Thielman believed that Forever could not last as it faced CBS' Person of Interest in the 10 p.m. timeslot and as Forever's lead-in, Marvel's Agents of S.H.I.E.L.D., had dropped in the ratings during its first season. Lowery also believed that the lack of answers about Henry's immortality could not sustain the series. The Hollywood Reporter's Tim Goodman concurred, feeling that the lack of answers about Henry's immortality could pose problems for viewers. Still others felt that the series was a derivative of other series. Brian Tallerico of RogerEbert.com felt that the series was a derivative of Sherlock Holmes. Although Hillary Busis of Entertainment Weekly felt that Forever was a derivative of other procedurals, she stated that the show was "breezy and entertaining and reasonably clever, at least when its Sherlock Scanning isn't out of control" due to the performances of Gruffudd, de la Garza, and Hirsch and due to Miller's conceptualization of the series.

When Miller pitched the show to the various networks, network executives compared the series to New Amsterdam. New Amsterdam, a short-lived drama which aired on Fox in 2008, featured a 400-year-old male NYPD detective and a female partner. Miller stated that he had not heard about the series until he read some comments on an industry website. Television critics also took notice of the similarities between New Amsterdam and Forever. USA Today's Robert Bianco thought that Forever took a "smarter, lighter approach to the subject" of immortality than New Amsterdam did. Lowery, Roush, and Busis all noted the similarities between the two series in their reviews of Forever.

In France, Forever became a hit. The premiere on April 28, 2015, attracted 7.08 million viewers. During the series' broadcast in France, Forever averaged an audience of about 5.7 million viewers, or 26.2% of the total French audience, making it France's most-watched series on Tuesday nights. After the broadcast of the final episode, French fans of Forever joined English-speaking fans in their social media campaign to save the series.

When Forever premiered on Spain's Antena 3 on July 15, 2015, it drew 2,316,000 viewers. Over the course of the series, Forever averaged over 1.679 million viewers, making it a successful series in Spain. The series' success in spite of its cancellation in the United States prompted Rebeca Cortes of El Norte de Castilla to call Forever "the summer surprise".

The German paid-television channel Sat.1 Emotions began airing the first twelve episodes of Forever on February 3, 2015, but the series did not begin airing on Sat.1 on July 20, 2015. The ratings fluctuated throughout the run from the 2.02 million viewers which watched the pilot, but ratings never dipped below 1.44 million viewers. During Forever's run in Germany, the series averaged 1.82 million viewers and a 6.3 percent audience share; the series' market share was lower than Sat.1's average. Among viewers between the ages of 14 and 49, however, the show averaged 0.96 million viewers and a 9.4 percent market share, which was near the network's average.

In 2016, TF1 began rebroadcasting Forever on July 23. Germany's kabel eins began its rebroadcast of Forever on September 23, 2016.

=== Awards and online polls ===
Forever has been nominated for three awards and has improved ranking in two online polls. Forever received a nomination for "Best Primetime Television Program - Drama" category for the 30th annual Imagen Awards, but lost to Law & Order: SVU. In TV Guide's Fall TV Popularity Contest, Forever placed second, receiving 76% of TVGuide.com readers' votes. It received a nomination in the "Favorite New TV Drama" category for the 2015 People's Choice Awards but lost to The Flash. About 70.4% of voters in the E! Online's "The Definitive Ranking of the Best and Worst New Shows—According to You" poll ranked the series the third best new show of the 2014–2015 television season. When the poll was first conducted in November 2014, E! Online users voted Forever as the 17th worst new show of the season; the series received 60% of votes stating that the voters loved the series.

== Broadcast history ==
On May 8, 2014, ABC announced that the network had picked up Forever for the 2014-2015 television season. On July 15, 2014, the network announced that the series would have a two-day premiere, with the pilot airing on September 22 and the second episode debuting in the series' regular timeslot at 10 p.m. the next night. Forever premiered in the United States on ABC on September 22, 2014. Over 8.6 million viewers watched the episode live, and among adults 18–49, it had a 1.7 rating and a 5 share. The episode also retained a larger percentage of total viewers and of adults 18–49 from its lead-in than Castle's premiere on March 9, 2009; Castle kept 47% of total viewers and 49% of adults 18–49 while Forever kept 67% of total viewers and 77% of adults 18–49. The second episode, airing the next night, was ABC's top-rated episode in that timeslot since September 21, 2010; it was viewed by 6.5 million people live and had a 1.7 rating and a 5 share. Forever's second episode tied CBS' Person of Interest in adults 18–49 and beat the series in adults 18–34 and in women viewers. The episode also kept all of its adults 18–49 audience from the pilot's debut the night before and increased the adults 18–34 audience by 8%.

After the first two episodes, however, the series' live ratings dropped significantly to about 5 million live viewers. The Live+7-Day ratings, however, increased the audience by 3 million viewers, bringing the total audience to 8 million viewers weekly. That, and Forever's performance in the 10 p.m. timeslot being better than ABC's performance in that timeslot during the 2013–2014 television season, convinced ABC to pick up additional episodes of the series. Forever received a full-season order on November 7, 2014.

Forever aired a day before the U.S. on CTV in Canada. In the United Kingdom and Ireland, the show was acquired by Sky1. It premiered on October 2, 2014. The series premiered on Nine Network in Australia on February 11, 2015. In New Zealand, TV One debuted Forever on February 16, 2015.

=== Video on demand ===
On July 1, 2016, The CW announced that Forever was available to stream on the free digital-only network CW Seed.

=== Series cancellation ===
Before the season finale aired, Miller and the writers proposed the storyline for season two to ABC and to Warner Bros. They pitched the idea of season two exploring the ramifications of Jo or another character, aside from Abe, learning about Henry's immortality, romance, and the pleasures associated with immortality. They also planned to introduce several new characters to the series. In an interview with Entertainment Weekly's Natalie Abrams, Miller stated that ABC appeared to like the direction of the show's second season. On May 7, however, ABC announced the series' cancellation. Gruffudd's wife Alice Evans told fans about the cancellation on Twitter; Gruffudd posted a letter on Instagram detailing his reaction to the series' cancellation and thanking the show's fans for their support a few hours later.

In the meantime, Warner Bros. and Miller began to shop the series to other networks. On July 7, Miller posted a letter to fans on Twitter stating that, as of that date, Warner Bros. had been unable to find another studio to produce the series and that the studio was still shopping it around to the networks. During a Twitter question-and-answer session on September 17, 2015, Miller revealed the characters that he wanted to introduce (biological children viewed in flashbacks), and that the character who would learn of Henry's immortality in season 2 was to be Lucas.

Officially, the network cited that Forever's live ratings was the main factor behind the series' cancellation. The pilot episode drew 8.26 million viewers live, but the finale drew 4.13 million live. On average, the series drew 4.93 million viewers live and a 1.12 adults 18–49 demographic weekly. In term of the Nielsen ratings' Live+7 Day ratings, Forever averaged 7.034 million viewers and drew a 1.7 adults 18–49 demographic. About 3.23 million people, or about 68% of Forever's audience, watched the series within seven days of the episodes original broadcast. Forever had the 19th-highest lift in total viewers for the 2014–2015 television season. In addition, Forever had the 7th-largest increase in adults 18–49 from DVR viewing during the season. It was among the top 20 programs that received the largest increase in adults 18–49 within the first three days of viewing, and it received the 14th-highest increase in adults 18–49 from Live+3-Day to Live+7-Day viewing.

Television critics believed that live ratings was not the only factor in ABC's cancellation of Forever. The Orange County Register's Michael Hewitt and Adweek's Jason Lynch noted that several of ABC's other low-rated shows, in particular ABC's limited series American Crime, received renewals in spite of ratings that were similar to Forever's. American Crime had an average audience of 4.98 million viewers live and a 1.16 adults 18–49 demographic weekly; its Live+7 Day audience, however, averaged 6.697 million viewers and a 1.7 adults 18–49 demographic. Verne Gay of Newsday, Nellie Andreeva of Deadline Hollywood, and Stephen Battaglio of the Los Angeles Times pointed out that ABC renewed series produced by ABC Studios as a part of the network's decision to increase ownership of their series to compete with Netflix and Hulu. Forever, produced by Warner Bros., was one of three cancellations for the network, the other two being Resurrection and Cristela. Kate Stanhope of The Hollywood Reporter and Matt Roush of TV Insider felt that Forever's time slot was a factor for the low ratings. Stanhope mentioned that Forever was airing opposite NBC's Chicago Fire and CBS' Person of Interest, both established series on their respective networks while Roush believed that Forever did not have a strong lead-in in. John Sica, a reporter for The Rockaway Times who had worked on the series, cited a lack of promotion and an inconsistent scheduling of episodes during Forever's run as factors that led to the series cancellation.

==== Fan reaction ====
Before the series' cancellation, Forever placed fourth in USA Today's 18th annual "Save Our Shows" poll. When ABC announced the cancellation of Forever, fans were outraged, and some left angry messages on ABC's Facebook page. Using the hashtag #SaveForever, others began a social media campaign on Facebook and Twitter to save the series. An online petition on Change.org generated over 6,500 signatures within two days of being created, and it generated over 12,600 signatures in three days. By May 27, it had generated nearly 27,000 signatures. Some have had requested that Netflix or another network take over the production of the series. By November 5, 2015, the petition generated 107,150 signatures.

The cancellation generated a discussion on social media. When TVLine posted a story about the cancellation, it generated 2,175 comments, making it the third most talked-about story in the site's five-year history. About 43.70% of Entertainment Weekly online readers voted it as the most-missed cancellation in Entertainment Weekly's online poll.

A fan-made, non-profit, unofficial graphic novel, titled "Forever & Ever!", debuted on Facebook on January 5, 2016. According to one of the comic series' co-creators, the novel expands the fictional universe created by Miller by introducing new material and new characters.

=== Ratings ===
In Australia, the first episode was watched by 619,000 viewers, making it the fourteenth most-watched broadcast that night. The second one was viewed by 522,000 viewers, making it the twentieth most-watched. In Canada, the first and second episodes received 2.32 and 1.57 million viewers, respectively. In the United Kingdom, the premiere garnered 847,000 viewers, making it the highest-rated broadcast on the network that week. In New Zealand, it was the third most-watched broadcast in prime time that night, with 243,650 viewers.

Viewership and ratings per episode of Forever
No.	Title	Air date	Rating/share (18–49)	Viewers (millions)	DVR (18–49)	DVR viewers (millions)	Total (18–49)	Total viewers (millions)
1	"Pilot"	September 22, 2014	1.5/4	8.26	0.9	3.58	2.4	11.84
2	"Look Before You Leap"	September 23, 2014	1.7/5	6.62	0.9	3.44	2.6	10.06
3	"Fountain of Youth"	September 30, 2014	1.4/5	5.69	1.0	3.58	2.4	9.24
4	"The Art of Murder"	October 7, 2014	1.2/4	5.17	0.7	2.93	1.9	8.10
5	"The Pugilist Break"	October 14, 2014	1.1/3	4.81	0.9	3.27	2.0	8.08
6	"The Frustrating Thing About Psychopaths"	October 21, 2014	1.2/4	4.95	0.9	3.42	2.1	8.37
7	"New York Kids"	October 28, 2014	1.1/3	4.95	0.9	3.14	2.0	8.09
8	"The Ecstasy of Agony"	November 11, 2014	1.0/3	4.23	1.0	3.52	2.0	7.75
9	"6 A.M."	November 18, 2014	1.0/3	4.43	1.0	3.25	2.0	7.68
10	"The Man in the Killer Suit"	December 2, 2014	1.2/4	5.17	1.1	3.50	2.3	8.67
11	"Skinny Dipper"	December 9, 2014	1.1/3	5.20	0.8	3.04	1.9	8.24
12	"The Wolves of Deep Brooklyn"	January 6, 2015	1.1/4	4.93	0.9	3.47	2.0	8.40
13	"Diamonds Are Forever"	January 13, 2015	1.0/3	4.75	1.0	3.48	2.0	8.22
14	"Hitler on the Half Shell"	February 3, 2015	0.9/3	4.39	0.8	3.08	1.7	7.47
15	"The King of Columbus Circle"	February 10, 2015	1.1/4	4.62	0.7	2.91	1.8	7.53
16	"Memories of Murder"	February 24, 2015	1.0/3	4.66	0.9	3.26	1.9	7.78
17	"Social Engineering"	March 3, 2015	1.0/3	4.40	0.7	2.98	1.7	7.38
18	"Dead Men Tell Long Tales"	March 24, 2015	0.9/3	4.42	1.0	3.44	1.9	7.86
19	"Punk is Dead"	March 31, 2015	1.1/3	4.66	0.7	3.10	1.8	7.76
20	"Best Foot Forward"	April 7, 2015	0.9/3	4.06	0.8	2.90	1.7	6.94
21	"The Night in Question"	April 21, 2015	1.0/3	4.04	0.7	2.93	1.7	6.97
22	"The Last Death of Henry Morgan"	May 5, 2015	1.1/4	4.13	0.6	2.87	1.7	7.00

== Home video releases ==
Miller revealed that Warner Bros. would release DVDs for the series during a Twitter question-and-answer session on September 17, 2015. On November 16, 2015, Warner Home Entertainment of Canada announced that DVDs for the series would be released on January 19, 2016. That day, Warner Bros. announced it would be made available in the United States through the company's Warner Archive Collection as a manufacture-on-demand title. The DVD contained all 22 episodes of the series on five discs, along with deleted scenes from many of the episodes. The Region 4 DVD was released on February 3, 2016. The entire series will be released on Blu-ray on October 13, 2026 (originally scheduled for August 25, 2026), through Warner Archive.

== Streaming ==
The series was available to stream on The CW's streaming service, The CW, and is currently available on Amazon Prime.

== See also ==
- New Amsterdam (2008 TV series)—a crime drama also set in New York City with a similar premise
- Harrow (2018) - another series starring Ioan Gruffudd as a pathologist.
