= Donnie Keshawarz =

Canadian actor (born 1969)

- Born: 30 July 1969 (age 57); Guelph, Ontario, Canada
- Education: Rutgers University (BA); University of Missouri–Kansas City (MA)
- Occupation: Actor
- Years active: 1987–present

Donnie Keshawarz (born July 30, 1969) is a Canadian-born American stage, film and television actor.

== Early life and education ==
Donnie Keshawarz was born on July 30, 1969, in Guelph, Ontario, Canada to Afghan parents. He grew up in Jonesboro, Arkansas and attended Jonesboro High School. He earned a bachelor's degree from Rutgers University and a master's degree from the University of Missouri–Kansas City. He also studied acting under Herbert Berghof.

== Career ==
Since 1987, Keshawarz has appeared in numerous television roles, most notably in a recurring role in 2003 as Yusuf Auda on the television series 24 as well as a recurring role in the HBO series The Sopranos. He has also made guest appearances on Law & Order, Lost, Sex and the City, Hack, Blue Bloods, and Homeland.

Keshawarz also starred in the ABC television series Forever and in 2013 he made a brief appearance in The Wolf of Wall Street.

He has also appeared in several films, including Loving Leah (2009), The Adjustment Bureau (2011), Experimenter (2015) and Ad Astra (2019).

== Filmography ==
=== Film ===
Year	Title	Role	Notes
2000	Growing Down in Brooklyn	John 'Pip' Pipitone	
2004	Tony & Tina's Wedding	Donnie Dulce	
2006	Drifting Elegant	Victor Saad	
2008	The Collective	Rost	
2011	The Adjustment Bureau	Donaldson	
2013	The Wolf of Wall Street	Stratton Broker #3	
2014	The Cobbler	Pinchas Simkin	
2015	Experimenter	Bruno	
2019	Ad Astra	Captain Lawrence Tanner	
2020	Tesla	J. P. Morgan	

=== Television ===
Year	Title	Role	Notes
1999	As the World Turns	Gary Rady	2 episodes
2000	Sex and the City	Greg Miller	Episode: "Politically Erect"
2002	Hack	Cop	Episode: "All Night Long"
2003	24	Yusuf Auda	6 episodes
2004, 2011	Law & Order: Special Victims Unit	Various roles	2 episodes
2003	Pure 24	Yusuf	Episode #1.18
2005	Lost	Essam Tasir	Episode: "The Greater Good"
2006	Love Monkey	Clete	2 episodes
2006–2007	The Sopranos	Muhammed	6 episodes
2007	Damages	Andrew Vida	9 episodes
2008	New Amsterdam	Nazir	Episode: "Reclassified"
2008	Fringe	Gerard	Episode: "The Ghost Network"
2009	Loving Leah	Raj	Television film
2009	Law & Order	Mr. Nozari	Episode: "Rapture"
2009	Ugly Betty	Detective	Episode: "The Born Identity"
2009	White Collar	Dmitri	Episode: "Threads"
2011	One Life to Live	Kahlid	3 episodes
2011	Blue Bloods	Johnny Vega	Episode: "Little Fish"
2012	Elementary	Earl Wheeler	Episode: "The Long Fuse"
2013	Person of Interest	Nick Breckenridge	Episode: "Mors Praematura"
2013	Homeland	Hafez 'A-Z' Azizi	2 episodes
2014–2015	Forever	Mike Hanson	22 episodes
2016	Shades of Blue	Nate	Episode: "What Devil Do"
2016	Beauty & the Beast	Agent Morgan	Episode: "Point of No Return"
2017	The Blacklist: Redemption	Agent Lamb	Episode: "Whitehall: Conclusion"
2017, 2021	Bull	Various roles	2 episodes
2018	The Good Fight	Republican Fixer	Episode: "Day 485"
2019	FBI	Yousef	Episode: "Undisclosed"
2020	Tommy	Simmons	2 episodes
2021	New Amsterdam	Dominic Mancini	Episode: "Death Is the Rule. Life Is the Exception"
2023	The Blacklist	Rod Thieman	Episode: "The Troll Farmer (No. 38): Pt. 2"
2024	True Detective	Adam Bryce	2 episodes
