= MacKenzie Mauzy =

American actress (born 1988)

- Born: MacKenzie Grace Mauzy; October 14, 1988 (age 37); Greensboro, North Carolina, U.S.
- Occupation: Actress
- Years active: 1998–present
- Spouses: John Arthur Greene (m. 2012; div. 2015); Scott Ratliff (m. 2022)

MacKenzie Grace Mauzy (born October 14, 1988) is an American actress. She played the role of Phoebe Forrester on CBS daytime soap opera The Bold and the Beautiful from 2006 to 2008, and recurred as Abigail on the 2014 ABC television drama series Forever.

== Personal life ==
Mauzy was born in Greensboro, North Carolina and raised in Lancaster, Pennsylvania.

On June 9, 2012, she married fellow stage actor, and former American Idol contestant, John Arthur Greene. They separated and, later, divorced in 2015.

Mauzy married PLL Lacrosse Player Scott Ratliff on October 1, 2022.

== Career ==
Before launching her acting career, Mauzy worked in New York City, Virginia, and North Carolina in stage productions of classic plays such as A Christmas Carol, Snow White and Macbeth. In 1998, Mauzy won the Anna Wentworth Award for "Best Child Actress" for her role as Annie Warbucks in the production of Annie at Showtimers Theatre in Roanoke, Virginia.

She also played Lizzie Spaulding on the CBS soap Guiding Light from October 2000 to August 2002. She has also guest starred on CBS's CSI: Crime Scene Investigation, CSI: NY and NBC's Law & Order: SVU. She played the role of the rich Phoebe Forrester on CBS soap opera The Bold and the Beautiful from July 2006 until December 2008, when her character Phoebe was killed off.

In July 2008, MacKenzie was cast as Ilse in the 1st National Tour of the hit Broadway musical Spring Awakening. MacKenzie turned it down in order to be in the Broadway musical, A Tale of Two Cities. Mauzy played The Seamstress in the musical, which was executive produced by Barbara Russell and Ron Sharpe. The play, which cost $16 million to produce, closed on November 16, 2009, after 33 previews and 68 regular performances.

Mauzy joined the Broadway cast of Next to Normal, temporarily standing by for Jennifer Damiano as Natalie Goodman. She then succeeded Meghann Fahy as the standby for Natalie, with Fahy replacing Jennifer Damiano as the full-time Natalie. Mauzy stayed with the Broadway production (going on at various times) until the Broadway production closed on Sunday, January 16, 2011, after 21 previews and 733 regular performances. She starred in the musical, White Noise, which is, in part, based on a real life white supremacist pop duo, Prussian Blue. White Noise played a limited run at the Royal George theater in Chicago, IL. The play, presented by Whoopi Goldberg, opened on April 9, 2011, and received mixed reviews and audience feedback. It closed ahead of schedule on May 15, 2011. Starting October 26, 2012, Mauzy had a featured role in Michael John LaChiusa's musical Giant at The Public Theater as Claire "Luz" Benedict.

In 2014, Mauzy landed a recurring role in the ABC television drama Forever, playing Abigail, the late wife of the character Henry Morgan (Ioan Gruffudd); Henry was a 200-year-old immortal and he married Abigail after they met during World War 2, with their relationship being portrayed through flashbacks. In that same year, she was featured in the film Into the Woods as Rapunzel. In 2016 Mauzy was cast as Linda Kasabian in the Lifetime television film, Manson's Lost Girls, alongside Jeff Ward, Eden Brolin and Greer Grammer.

== Filmography ==
Film roles
| Year | Title | Role | Notes |
|---|---|---|---|
| 2012 | Construction | Courtney Wolfson | |
| 2013 | Brother's Keeper | Maggie Malloye | |
| 2014 | Into the Woods | Rapunzel | |
| 2023 | Sun Moon | Kelsey | |

Television roles
| Year | Title | Role | Notes |
|---|---|---|---|
| 2000–2002 | Guiding Light | Lizzie Spaulding | Recurring role |
| 2006 | CSI: NY | Sara Butler | Episode: "Stealing Home" |
| 2006–2008 | The Bold and the Beautiful | Phoebe Forrester | Main role: 224 episodes |
| 2007 | Cold Case | Anna Gunden (2006) | Episode: "Running Around" |
| 2009 | Law & Order | Carly Di Gravia | Episode: "Crimebusters" |
| 2010 | CSI: Crime Scene Investigation | Emily Marsh | Episode: "Lost & Found" |
| 2010 | The Stay-At-Home Dad | N/A | Episode: "Game Over" |
| 2010 | Drop Dead Diva | Tina | Episode: "Begin Again" |
| 2012 | NCIS: Los Angeles | Erin | Episode: "Crimeleon" |
| 2012 | Bones | SueBob Mobley | Episode: "The Family in the Feud" |
| 2014–2015 | Forever | Abigail Morgan | Recurring role |
| 2016 | Manson's Lost Girls | Linda Kasabian | Television film |
| 2017 | Girls Night Out | McKenzie | Television film |
| 2017 | Gone | Sabrina | Episodes: "Crystal", "Family Photo" |
| 2019 | The Good Fight | Sabrina Wynne | Episode: "The One with Lucca Becoming a Meme" |
| 2020 | NCIS: New Orleans | Sarah Murphy | Episode: "A Changed Woman" |
