= Salem season 2 =

Salem
- Season 2
- Promotional poster
- Starring: Janet Montgomery; Shane West; Seth Gabel; Ashley Madekwe; Tamzin Merchant; Elise Eberle; Iddo Goldberg; Joe Doyle; Oliver Bell
- No. of episodes: 13

Release
- Original network: WGN America
- Original release: April 5 – June 28, 2015

Season chronology
- ← Previous; Season 1 Next → Season 3

The second season of Salem, an American horror-drama television series on WGN America, premiered on April 5, 2015, and concluded on June 28, 2015, consisting of thirteen episodes. Created for television by Adam Simon and Brannon Braga, who write or co-write episodes of the show, the series is based on the Salem Witch Trials. It was executive produced by Braga, Coby Greenberg and David Von Ancken, with Braga and Simon assuming the role of showrunner.

The second season was announced on May 15, 2014 after only four episodes of the first season had aired.

== Cast ==
=== Main cast ===
- Janet Montgomery as Mary Sibley, Salem's most powerful enchantress
- Shane West as Captain John Alden, Mary's love interest
- Seth Gabel as Cotton Mather, the local witch hunter
- Ashley Madekwe as Tituba, Mary's slave and fellow witch
- Tamzin Merchant as Anne Hale, the daughter of the Magistrate
- Elise Eberle as Mercy Lewis, a tortured victim from the witches
- Iddo Goldberg as Isaac Walton, branded the fornicator
- Joe Doyle as Baron Sebastian von Marburg, Countess von Marburg's son
- Oliver Bell as Little John, Mary and John Alden's son

=== Recurring cast ===
- Lucy Lawless as Countess Palatine Ingrid von Marburg, an original witch hoping to raise the devil
- Stuart Townsend as Dr. Samuel Wainwright, a new doctor hoping to cure Salem of the plague
- Jeremy Crutchley as Wendell Hathorne, the new elected Magistrate
- Sammi Hanratty as Dollie Trask, Mercy's best friend
- Cara Santana as Sooleawa, an Indian girl
- Michael Mulheren as George Sibley, the elected official of Salem

=== Guest cast ===
- Stephen Lang as Increase Mather, Cotton's father who takes over the witch hunt
- Christopher Berry as The Seer, a man who lives in the woods

== Production ==
=== Writing ===
The writing team for the show had a major overhaul after the first season. Among the first season staff, only Adam Simon, Brannon Braga and Joe Menosky remained on the show. In an interview with Gavin Hetherington of SpoilerTV, Simon said "there were some very talented writers that worked on season one but they also came from very different backgrounds. They had very strong opinions where they wanted things to go, which was great, except they were telling 13 different stories and I was trying to tell one story in 13 episodes." There were inconsistencies with the writing between episodes due to the sometimes clashing writing style, and Simon further commented that "sometimes it seemed to me that characters I created suddenly sounded very different [in the episodes Adam didn't write], they weren't even speaking quite the same language from episode to episode which was tough on the actors and on the audience."

As a result of this, Elizabeth Sarnoff, Tricia Small and Jon Harmon Feldman did not return for season two. A new writing staff were brought in, and the three remaining writers from season one were joined by Kelly Souders, Brian Peterson, Turi Meyer, Al Septien—who all had previously worked on Smallville together—and Donna Thorland.

== Episodes ==
No. overall	No. in season	Title	Directed by	Written by	Original release date	Prod. code	U.S. viewers (millions)
14	1	"Cry Havoc"	Nick Copus	Brannon Braga & Adam Simon	April 5, 2015	2WAT01	0.510
In the wake of the Grand Rite—merely the first phase of the Hive's dark undertaking—a horrendous plague sweeps through Salem. Tensions escalate between Tituba and Mary, who tries to enjoy what limited time she is allowed to spend with her young, recently returned son. Mary confronts Mercy Lewis in a bid to strike a bargain with the upstart Witch, but Mercy already has diabolical plans of trying to take Salem by force. As Anne Hale begins to comprehend the nature of her own true power, she is extended an offer by Mary that may provide her some clarity and relief. Meanwhile, as Mary attempts to exert her mortal influence over the citizenry of Salem, she makes the acquaintance of an intriguing true man of science, Dr. Samuel Wainwright, who may threaten her cause. Back in Boston, a haunted Cotton Mather must answer for his failure in Salem and the death of his father; and Mary learns John Alden's fate, or so she thinks.
15	2	"Blood Kiss"	Allan Arkush	Brannon Braga & Adam Simon	April 12, 2015	2WAT02	0.376
In the wake of Mercy's brutal act of violence in killing the Elders and claiming war against Mary, Mary works to rally the citizenry of Salem against her rebellious, wayward former protégé, and burned Mercy and her followers at the crags. Despite the unwanted distraction, Mary moves forward in her bid to complete her Hive's dark task with the promise that her eventual success will result in a permanent reunion with her son. As Dr. Wainwright looks for clues to cure the growing plague, his methods create concern for the Selectmen. While his only hope seems to be the discovery of the pox-ravaged Isaac, who, beyond all expectations, clings to life, the possibility of his success creates additional concern for Mary and Tituba. Meanwhile, John Alden prepares for an epic confrontation still to come, and has a telling encounter with Petrus but kills Petrus' after information has been traded; Mary's son begins to show another, unsettling side of his nature; and Anne Hale—ripe with her new and as-of-yet uncontrollable powers—travels via her dead father's mask, to Boston to where Cotton is. But discovers more than she bargained for.
16	3	"From Within"	Alex Zakrzewski	Kelly Souders & Brian Peterson	April 19, 2015	2WAT03	0.495
As the town of Salem continues to try to cope with the mounting plague, suspicions and fear grip the townspeople, and one of Mary's recent adversaries, Hathorne, takes steps to place himself in a position of power among the citizenry and above Mary, leading Mary to rally her allies and resort to promoting another witch to the higher position to maintain control of the town. Meanwhile, Anne and Cotton find they share some common ground, an earlier act of mercy may come back to haunt Mary, tensions of an intimate nature continue to smolder between Mary and Dr. Wainwright, John arrives back in Salem and makes his first move by killing his first witch, and Mary and Tituba discovers that someone strong wants Mary dead.
17	4	"Book of Shadows"	Allan Kroeker	Joe Menosky & Adam Simon	April 26, 2015	2WAT04	0.331
In the wake of the most recent attack against her, Mary seeks answers to who may be responsible. To that end—and despite Tituba's warnings—Mary begins to tutor Anne Hale in the ways of witchcraft, but her work may not culminate exactly as planned. Upon his return to Salem, Cotton meets Dr. Wainwright and despite their obvious initial differences of opinions, each discovers the other may have something to offer in their mutual task. John Alden continues to make his presence felt in Salem, and his actions have repercussions for him, and for others, in ways both political and physical. Mercy moves forward in her plans of revenge against Mary even when Dollie, her only follower, and her father refused to participate. Meanwhile, Mary and Wainwright continue to explore their mutual interests, and Mary and Tituba search for the witch hunter.
18	5	"The Wine Dark Sea"	Peter Weller	Turi Meyer & Al Septien	May 3, 2015	2WAT05	0.334
Following Mary's public chastening, the recently minted Magistrate Hathorne steps up his bid to wrest power over the citizenry of Salem from her, forcing Mary to once again compel her bewitched husband to take action. When Hathorne threatens against Anne Hale—giving her the choice of marriage to him or be accused of witchcraft—it prompts the young Witch to seek Mary's council. She receives sound advice to either marry Hathorne or Cotton. But it comes at a fearful and unappealing cost. Mercy Lewis' grisly preparations to enact her revenge reach new heights, drawing Dollie and her Reverend Lewis closer in the process, and forcing the hand of one of her increasingly tenuous allies. Meanwhile, as John Alden continues to pursue his righteous task, his search for answers yields valuable results, and Mary takes the fight directly to her newest foes, Countess Marburg and her son, Sebastian, with surprising results.
19	6	"Ill Met by Moonlight"	Nick Copus	Brian Peterson & Kelly Souders	May 10, 2015	2WAT06	0.245
The Countess Marburg arrives in Salem bearing gifts for the citizenry and advice for Mary. As she plans her next move, her son Sebastian remains preoccupied by less puritanical matters. While Anne Hale reflects both guiltily and gleefully on her recent activities in using witchcraft to sway Cotton's heart, Cotton Mather—fueled by magic, alcohol, or perhaps by true emotion—comes to blows with Hathorne in the way he spoke about Anne. The ensuing battle leads to an outcome that hindered Mary's plans. John Alden pursues his deadly mission and—finding himself seriously weakened by his recent and repeated uses of unfamiliar magic—seeks respite in a familiar place. Meanwhile, Cotton makes a measured confession, two of Salem's most damaged residents continue to find solace in each other, Mercy is visited by Countess Marburg who takes her in, and Mary seeks out help from an unexpected source: Increase Mather.
20	7	"The Beckoning Fair One"	Joe Dante	Donna Thorland & Adam Simon	May 17, 2015	2WAT07	0.321
Mary resorts to drastic measures, by temporarily bringing Increase's soul from Hell, in a bid to attain valuable information for use in combating the Countess, and she tries to shore up her political hold over Salem with a move that could either assure her success or seal her fate. As Anne Hale continues her Witch's tutorial through her father's Witch book, she learns that getting what she desires comes at a cost, and that in order to continue on her seemingly powerful path she must still remain supplicant to others. As the Countess and her son, Sebastian, continue to work their plan, they are presented with a rare glimpse into their enemy's stronghold where they are introduced to Little John unexpectedly, and their cause is made stronger by Mercy. Wainwright returns to Salem having gained some measure of information that shed light on the town's particular strain of plague to Mary but reveals that he is willing to join with Mary to know more about their powers. Meanwhile, Tituba makes plans for John Alden, whom she had caught while he was to kill Anne in her sleep, and Cotton gets a surprising visit from his father's ghost.
21	8	"Dead Birds"	Alex Kalymnios	Joe Menosky & Adam Simon	May 24, 2015	2WAT08	0.310
When Increase threatens to backfire on her, she strikes a deal in letting Increase see his own son. While she learns a bit of the history which surrounds Countess Marburg, the key to defeating the Countess still remains hidden. Both Anne and Cotton receive unexpected late-night visitors, with Anne being visited by the Devil and Cotton visited by his father. As Mary tries to bond with her son, she and Tituba discover that the seemingly scared and vulnerable little boy is harboring unsettling thoughts and predilections, and perhaps even darker secrets in that he is called "Prince" by Tituba. Meanwhile, with the help of her familiar, Anne Hale begins to discover some of her father's hidden—and unsettling—secrets; Tituba tries to strike a deal with the captured John Alden.
22	9	"Wages of Sin"	David Grossman	Al Septien & Turi Meyer	May 31, 2015	2WAT09	0.394
As the "Starry Messenger" comet approaches Earth, heralding the culmination of the Witches' dark plan, the Countess Marburg makes a long awaited acquaintance with one who plays a pivotal role in her and the others' cause. Mary and Wainwright grow closer, their mutual affection heightened by recently discovered revelations, but as the pair plans for the next steps along the journey she has in store for him, Sebastian takes matters into his own hands by killing Wainwright out of jealousy. Even as Mary prepares to strike against the Countess, she receives news that shakes her to the core. As Cotton tries to reason out information recently revealed to him, the betrayal of a recently made ally may spell his mortal doom. Meanwhile, Anne continues to glean knowledge from her dead father's writings, and a long-brewing feud reaches a tipping point, culminating in a surprising and potentially game-changing disclosure.
23	10	"Til Death Do Us Part"	Tim Andrew	Kelly Souders & Brian Peterson	June 7, 2015	2WAT10	0.284
As the Countess Marburg prepares for the imminent arrival of the "Starry Messenger" and her lover, the Dark Lord, Mary stages a last ditch effort to thwart the eternal Witch's plans, but her failure rest in the hands of John Alden and Cotton who each have something important at stake. After receiving devastating news, Anne Hale finds she is faced with making a time-sensitive decision, to either join Count Marburg or lose Cotton, and it takes knowing words from another interested party to strengthen her resolve. Even so, the young Witch finds herself at a crossroads but continues to give Little John up for Cotton's life. Meanwhile, Cotton Mather faces his imminent demise—the result of Magistrate Hawthorne's jealous treachery—until Alden intervenes. But his rescue could come at a price that he may be unwilling—or even unable—to pay.
24	11	"On Earth as in Hell"	Nick Copus	Joe Menosky & Adam Simon	June 14, 2015	2WAT11	0.314
As the Countess and her son move against John Alden's Indian friends, Mary suffers under the yoke of Puritan oppression stemming from an alliance between the Marburgs and another of Mary's powerful enemies in Salem. But even as she seems to be at her most hopeless, Mary tries to take advantage of a widening schism between mother and son. As John and Cotton proceed with their exorcism of Little John, each must process new information and gather strength to aid them in what lies ahead. Meanwhile, wracked with guilt and sorrow over Dollie's death, a mournful Isaac pays a surprise visit to an already somber town gathering, Anne Hale finds the fate of many may rest in her novice—but powerful—Witch's hands, and John and Cotton get the first glimpses of the enemy they are facing within Little John.
25	12	"Midnight Never Come"	Alex Zakrzewski	Donna Thorland & Adam Simon	June 21, 2015	2WAT12	0.318
With the Starry Messenger comet drawing ever closer, John Alden fights for his very life, while Anne Hale works to comfort and protect Little John whose death brings with it great consequences for Witch and mortal alike. She soon learns from Count Marburg that she is Marburg's daughter and Sebastian's sister, and is faced with a terrifying decision that could greatly impact the Countess's plans. Mary, palpably affected by recent events, finds herself in a wholly unfamiliar situation, leading her to try a risky gambit. Meanwhile, when John tells Cotton that Anna too is a witch, it leads the younger Mather to seek out answers on his own, but he is trapped and imprisoned; Mercy pursues Sebastian in her foolish and hopeless dreams of becoming a ruler and royalty, but finds Mary's advice to be fatefully and disappointingly accurate; and Isaac finds himself in a position among his fellow citizens of Salem.
26	13	"The Witching Hour"	Brannon Braga	Adam Simon	June 28, 2015	2WAT13	0.337
With her mission seemingly accomplished, the Countess Marburg revels in the apparent completion of her plans, but the Dark Lord she dedicated herself to has desires to be with Mary instead. Sebastian grows increasingly weary of the Countess's treatment, leading to an unexpected act of defiance. Emotionally drained by recent events, an all-but-defeated Mary stages a last-ditch effort against the Countess to make them both burn. Meanwhile, John is visited by the Indian chief and his daughter and they offer a place for him in the spiritual world; Mercy is shattered by unsaid promises that have been broken, leaving her to wander Salem alone as she continues her life of luring children for their blood; an unrepentant and increasingly powerful Anne faces the personal consequences of her actions in accepting she is Marburg's daughter, leading her down to a dark path; and when Cotton learns Anne will not risk him leaving her sights, his reaction is initially mixed, until a startling confession strengthens his resolve. But Anne intends to keep him against his will, with his fate like that of George Sibley.

== Reception ==
=== Critical response ===
Upon reviewing several episodes of the second season, Gavin Hetherington of SpoilerTV called Salem the "best goddamn show on TV right now."

=== Ratings ===
Viewership and ratings per episode of Salem season 2
No.	Title	Air date	Rating/share (18–49)	Viewers (millions)	DVR (18–49)	DVR viewers (millions)	Total (18–49)	Total viewers (millions)
1	"Cry Havoc"	April 5, 2015	0.2	0.51	0.5 (Note: Live + 3)	1.01	—N/a	—N/a
2	"Blood Kiss"	April 12, 2015	0.1	0.38	—N/a	—N/a	—N/a	—N/a
3	"From Within"	April 19, 2015	0.2	0.50	—N/a	—N/a	—N/a	—N/a
4	"Book of Shadows"	April 26, 2015	0.1	0.33	—N/a	—N/a	—N/a	—N/a
5	"The Wine Dark Sea"	May 3, 2015	0.1	0.33	—N/a	—N/a	—N/a	—N/a
6	"Ill Met by Moonlight"	May 10, 2015	0.1	0.25	—N/a	—N/a	—N/a	—N/a
7	"The Beckoning Fair One"	May 17, 2015	0.2	0.32	—N/a	—N/a	—N/a	—N/a
8	"Dead Birds"	May 24, 2015	0.1	0.31	—N/a	—N/a	—N/a	—N/a
9	"Wages of Sin"	May 31, 2015	0.1	0.39	0.4	—N/a	—N/a	—N/a
10	"Til Death Do Us Part"	June 7, 2015	0.1	0.28	0.3	—N/a	—N/a	—N/a
11	"On Earth as in Hell"	June 14, 2015	0.1	0.31	—N/a	—N/a	—N/a	—N/a
12	"Midnight Never Come"	June 21, 2015	0.1	0.32	0.2	—N/a	—N/a	—N/a
13	"The Witching Hour"	June 28, 2015	0.1	0.34	—N/a	—N/a	—N/a	—N/a
