= Salem season 3 =

Salem
- Season 3
- Promotional poster
- Starring: Janet Montgomery; Shane West; Seth Gabel; Ashley Madekwe; Tamzin Merchant; Elise Eberle; Iddo Goldberg; Joe Doyle; Oliver Bell
- No. of episodes: 10

Release
- Original network: WGN America
- Original release: November 2, 2016 – January 25, 2017

Season chronology
- ← Previous; Season 2

The third and final season of Salem, an American horror–drama television series on WGN America, premiered on November 2, 2016, and concluded on January 25, 2017, consisting of ten episodes. Created for television by Adam Simon and Brannon Braga, who write or co-write episodes of the show, the series is based on the Salem Witch Trials. It was executive produced by Braga, Coby Greenberg and David Von Ancken, with Braga and Simon assuming the role of showrunner.

On January 25, 2017, Salem was canceled after three seasons.

== Episodes ==
No. overall	No. in season	Title	Directed by	Written by	Original release date	Prod. code	U.S. viewers (millions)
27	1	"After the Fall"	Nick Copus	Brannon Braga & Adam Simon	November 2, 2016	3WAT01	0.272
28	2	"The Heart Is a Devil"	Tim Andrew	Adam Simon	November 9, 2016	3WAT02	0.212
29	3	"The Reckoning"	Wayne Yip	Kelly Souders & Brian Peterson	November 16, 2016	3WAT03	0.295
30	4	"Night's Black Agents"	Joe Dante	Joe Menosky & Donna Thorland	November 30, 2016	3WAT04	0.270
31	5	"The Witch Is Back"	Nick Copus	Adam Simon	December 7, 2016	3WAT05	0.257
32	6	"Wednesday's Child"	Peter Weller	Donna Thorland & Adam Simon	December 14, 2016	3WAT06	0.286
33	7	"The Man Who Was Thursday"	Jennifer Lynch	Brian Peterson & Kelly Souders	January 4, 2017	3WAT07	0.259
34	8	"Friday's Knights"	Nick Copus	Adam Simon & Donna Thorland	January 11, 2017	3WAT08	0.268
35	9	"Saturday Mourning"	Jennifer Lynch	Kelly Souders & Brian Peterson	January 18, 2017	3WAT09	0.236
36	10	"Black Sunday"	Brannon Braga	Adam Simon	January 25, 2017	3WAT10	0.233

== Cast ==
=== Main ===
- Janet Montgomery as Mary Sibley
- Shane West as John Alden
- Seth Gabel as Cotton Mather
- Ashley Madekwe as Tituba
- Oliver Bell as John Sibley/The Devil
- Joe Doyle as Sebastian Von Marburg
- Tamzin Merchant as Anne Hale
- Elise Eberle as Mercy Lewis
- Iddo Goldberg as Isaac Walton

=== Recurring ===
- Jonny Coyne as Treasurer Putnam
- Ashlyn Pearce as Alice Land
- Timothy Fall as French Commander
- Meagen Fay as Mrs Stoughton
- Clint James as Towering Bird Dick Man/Isaac's Man
- Shelby Lang as Lark
- Nadine Lewington as Rebecca Nurse
- Morgana Shaw as Essex Elder
- Emma Claire Wynn as Dorcas
- Robert Picardo as Mr Stoughton
- Azure Parsons as Gloriana Embry
- Owen Harn as Militia Leader
- Emily Skeggs as Billy

=== Guest ===
- Lucy Lawless as Countess Von Marburg
- Stephen Lang as Increase Mather
- Jeremy Crutchley as Wendell Hathorne
- Samuel Roukin as the Sentinel
- Marilyn Manson as Thomas Dinley

== Production ==
On July 11, 2015, WGN America renewed Salem for a 10-episode third season. On April 5, 2016, it was revealed the show would premiere the week of Halloween, rather than the usual April premiere slot. The series premiered on November 2, 2016.
