= Salem season 1 =

Salem
- Season 1
- Promotional poster
- Starring: Janet Montgomery; Shane West; Seth Gabel; Ashley Madekwe; Tamzin Merchant; Elise Eberle; Xander Berkeley; Iddo Goldberg
- No. of episodes: 13

Release
- Original network: WGN America
- Original release: April 20 – July 13, 2014

Season chronology
- Next → Season 2

The first season of Salem, an American horror–drama television series on WGN America, premiered on April 20, 2014, and concluded on July 13, 2014, consisting of thirteen episodes. Created for television by Adam Simon and Brannon Braga, who write or co-write episodes of the show, the series is based on the Salem Witch Trials. It was executive produced by Braga, Coby Greenberg and David Von Ancken, with Braga and Simon assuming the role of showrunner.

As the first original scripted show on WGN America, the pilot episode received 1.52 million viewers, and remained the network's highest-rated show throughout its first season run. The show was soon renewed for a second season. The season follows Mary Sibley, a witch conspiring with other witches to bring forth the Grand Rite, as she brings forth hysteria among the Puritans of Salem. Her former flame, John Alden, returns after years of absence, complicating her wicked plan.

== Cast ==
=== Main cast ===
- Janet Montgomery as Mary Walcott, Salem's most powerful enchantress
- Shane West as Captain John Alden, Mary's love interest
- Seth Gabel as Cotton Mather, the local witch hunter
- Ashley Madekwe as Tituba, Mary's friend and fellow witch
- Tamzin Merchant as Anne Hale, the daughter of the Magistrate
- Elise Eberle as Mercy Lewis, a tortured victim from the witches
- Xander Berkeley as Magistrate John Hale, the father of Anne
- Iddo Goldberg as Isaac Walton, branded the fornicator

=== Recurring cast ===
- Lara Grice as Mrs. Hale, the mother of Anne and wife of John Hale
- Michael Mulheren as George Sibley, the elected official of Salem
- Azure Parsons as Gloriana Embry, Cotton's love interest later banished by Increase
- Stephen Lang as Increase Mather, Cotton's father who takes over the witch hunt
- Morgana Shaw as Mab, the madam of the local brothel
- Mary Katherine O'Donnell as Emily Hopkins
- Sammi Hanratty as Dollie Trask, Mercy's best friend
- Christopher Berry as The Seer, a man who lives in the woods
- Lucy Faust as Elizabeth
- Diane Louise Salinger as Rose Browning, a fellow witch
- Thomas Francis Murphy as Reverend Lewis, the local priest

=== Guest cast ===
- Antonia Prebble as Bridget Bishop, a midwife accused of witchcraft
- Kevin Tighe as Giles Corey, has close ties to the Alden family

== Episodes ==
No. overall	No. in season	Title	Directed by	Written by	Original release date	Prod. code	U.S. viewers (millions)
1	1	"The Vow"	Richard Shepard	Brannon Braga & Adam Simon	April 20, 2014	1WAT01	1.521
Mary is a young, unwed girl pregnant with John Alden's baby in Salem, a Puritanical town. Believing her lover John was killed during King William's War, she is now faced with the Puritans' stocks and forehead branding, or giving her and John's child to the devil. Having chosen the latter, she marries the town's richest and most influential selectman George Sibley, claiming his wealth and power for herself by enslaving him. Reverend Cotton Mather is trying to stop witches from taking over America by killing them. John returns home to witness a witch-hunt, wherein Mary plans to use the trials to get Puritans to kill each other, allowing her to rule Salem.
2	2	"The Stone Child"	David Von Ancken	Brannon Braga & Adam Simon	April 27, 2014	1WAT02	0.774
Following the first death of the Grand Rite, Mary intends to sacrifice another innocent before the next full hunters moon in the form of a sign. Meanwhile, John works with Cotton Mather and Issac Walton in order to locate and stop the witches.
3	3	"In Vain"	Alex Zakrzewski	Elizabeth Sarnoff & Tricia Small	May 4, 2014	1WAT03	0.440
When Magistrate Hale discovers that it was Isaac who broke the witches circle, it's up to John to save him. A power struggle arises within the hive, forcing Mary to assert her authority with potentially deadly consequences.
4	4	"Survivors"	David Von Ancken	Jon Harmon Feldman	May 11, 2014	1WAT04	0.429
A face from John's past comes to Salem, and Mary's plans nearly come apart when she loses control of Mercy Lewis. Elsewhere, Mary's most trusted ally, Tituba, is forced to deceive John in order to eliminate a threat that endangers her mistress.
5	5	"Lies"	Sergio Mimica-Gezzan	Tricia Small & Elizabeth Sarnoff	May 18, 2014	1WAT05	0.500
Following the discovery of The Malum, John acquires the help of Cotton to find out more about the Grand Rite. Mary tries to regain control of Mercy, and Tituba is tasked by the hive to finally discover the secret of John Alden that he has killed to keep.
6	6	"The Red Rose and the Briar"	P. J. Pesce	Joe Menosky & Adam Simon	May 25, 2014	1WAT06	0.476
After successfully capturing Rose, John and Cotton plan to extract information on the Grand Rite from her during the planetary alignment with Saturn. Mary assists Mercy in becoming a witch, and initiates her into the hive.
7	7	"Our Own Private America"	David Von Ancken	Adam Simon & Brannon Braga	June 1, 2014	1WAT07	0.537
Mary rediscovers her passion for John, and her new apprentice Mercy could help accelerate the Grand Rite. Magistrate Hale tries to delay a possible threat to the hive. His daughter, Anne, becomes more suspicious of those around her.
8	8	"Departures"	Alex Zakrzewski	Jon Harmon Feldman	June 8, 2014	1WAT08	0.574
Upon his arrival, feared witch hunter Increase Mather wastes no time taking control of the witch hunt and Salem. Mary fears that Increase will discover her husband has been spelled, and enlists the help of Isaac to deter him from uncovering the truth.
9	9	"Children, Be Afraid"	David Grossman	Elizabeth Sarnoff & Tricia Small	June 15, 2014	1WAT09	0.490
Mary must act quickly in order to prevent Increase from undoing the spell placed on her husband. Mercy and her followers prove themselves useful to the greater cause, and Cotton mourns over the banishment of Gloriana.
10	10	"The House of Pain"	David Von Ancken	Adam Simon & Joe Menosky	June 22, 2014	1WAT10	0.465
While Mary deals with Mercy's betrayal, Tituba must endure the torture inflicted upon her by Increase in his newly founded "House of Pain". Meanwhile, Anne stumbles upon one of her fathers artifacts and suddenly finds herself far from home.
11	11	"Cat and Mouse"	Tricia Brock	Jon Harmon Feldman	June 29, 2014	1WAT11	0.591
With the help of Issac, Mary devises a plan that she hopes will rid her of both Mercy and Increase. John has been falsely accused of witchcraft and awaits trial, while Anne learns a dark truth about her heritage from her father.
12	12	"Ashes, Ashes"	Bill Johnson	Brannon Braga & Adam Simon	July 6, 2014	1WAT12	0.363
The trial of John Alden is held, with Increase as his prosecutor and Cotton as his defense. However, the ordeal brings a few unexpected secrets to light, and Mary is ultimately faced with a difficult decision.
13	13	"All Fall Down"	David Von Ancken	Brannon Braga & Adam Simon	July 13, 2014	1WAT13	0.432
Mary must choose between fleeing Salem with John or completing the Grand Rite, and Tituba reveals a long kept secret that could sway her decision. Meanwhile, Increase closes in on the witches, and the Hales prepare to go into hiding.

== Reception ==
=== Critical response ===
The first season of Salem received mixed reviews from critics, earning a 54% on Rotten Tomatoes based on 26 reviews, with the site's critical consensus reading: "While the horror scenes are well-executed, Salem lacks enough substance to sustain even a guilty-pleasure interest."

=== Ratings ===
The series premiere on April 20, 2014 garnered 1.5 million viewers and 647,000 Adults 18-49, which was a 635% increase over WGN America's season-to-date average in that timeslot. Including the other three airings that night, Salem had a cumulative 2.3 million viewers and 886,000 Adults 18-49. The premiere was also WGN America's highest rated telecast since 2007. In Live+3 DVR ratings, Salem rose to 3.1 million total viewers, and 1.3 million Adults 18-49, which was WGN America's best 18-49 performance since December 2003, and best performance in total viewers since December 2001.

The premiere averaged 3.4 million viewers and 1.5 million Adults 18-49 in Live+7 ratings, and the first two episodes averaged in 1.7 million viewers and 806,000 Adults 18-49 in the Live+7's. As a result, the show was renewed for a second season on May 5, 2014 after airing only 3 episodes. The season as a whole averaged a 0.22 18-49 rating and a 0.28 25-54 rating. It also averaged approximately 159,000 Females 18-49 and 126,000 Males 18-49 over the course of the season.

== Home media releases ==
The first season was released on DVD in the United States on October 28, 2014 by Fox Home Entertainment.
