= List of Salem episodes =

Salem is an American television series loosely based on the historic Salem Witch Trials created by Brannon Braga and Adam Simon. In the United States, it premiered on WGN America on April 20, 2014 as the network's first original scripted series. Salem follows the lives of a community in Salem, Massachusetts in the 17th century during the infamous Witch Trials, only this time it's the witches that are controlling them for their own wicked purposes. Mary Sibley (Janet Montgomery) leads a secret coven of witches, including Tituba (Ashley Madekwe) to turn the Puritans against one another to perform the Grand Rite, but things get complicated when Mary's lost love, John Alden (Shane West) returns to Salem, and Cotton Mather (Seth Gabel) closes in on the witches. On July 11, 2015, WGN America renewed Salem for a 10-episode third season which premiered on November 2, 2016. On December 13, 2016, it was announced that WGN had cancelled the show after three seasons. During the course of the series, 36 episodes of Salem aired over three seasons, concluding on January 25, 2017.

== Series overview ==
Season	Episodes	Originally released	
Season	Episodes	First released	Last released
1	13	April 20, 2014	July 13, 2014
2	13	April 5, 2015	June 28, 2015
3	10	November 2, 2016	January 25, 2017

== Episodes ==
=== Season 1 (2014) ===
No. overall	No. in season	Title	Directed by	Written by	Original release date	Prod. code	U.S. viewers (millions)
1	1	"The Vow"	Richard Shepard	Brannon Braga & Adam Simon	April 20, 2014	1WAT01	1.521
2	2	"The Stone Child"	David Von Ancken	Brannon Braga & Adam Simon	April 27, 2014	1WAT02	0.774
3	3	"In Vain"	Alex Zakrzewski	Elizabeth Sarnoff & Tricia Small	May 4, 2014	1WAT03	0.440
4	4	"Survivors"	David Von Ancken	Jon Harmon Feldman	May 11, 2014	1WAT04	0.429
5	5	"Lies"	Sergio Mimica-Gezzan	Tricia Small & Elizabeth Sarnoff	May 18, 2014	1WAT05	0.500
6	6	"The Red Rose and the Briar"	P. J. Pesce	Joe Menosky & Adam Simon	May 25, 2014	1WAT06	0.476
7	7	"Our Own Private America"	David Von Ancken	Adam Simon & Brannon Braga	June 1, 2014	1WAT07	0.537
8	8	"Departures"	Alex Zakrzewski	Jon Harmon Feldman	June 8, 2014	1WAT08	0.574
9	9	"Children, Be Afraid"	David Grossman	Elizabeth Sarnoff & Tricia Small	June 15, 2014	1WAT09	0.490
10	10	"The House of Pain"	David Von Ancken	Adam Simon & Joe Menosky	June 22, 2014	1WAT10	0.465
11	11	"Cat and Mouse"	Tricia Brock	Jon Harmon Feldman	June 29, 2014	1WAT11	0.591
12	12	"Ashes, Ashes"	Bill Johnson	Brannon Braga & Adam Simon	July 6, 2014	1WAT12	0.363
13	13	"All Fall Down"	David Von Ancken	Brannon Braga & Adam Simon	July 13, 2014	1WAT13	0.432

=== Season 2 (2015) ===
No. overall	No. in season	Title	Directed by	Written by	Original release date	Prod. code	U.S. viewers (millions)
14	1	"Cry Havoc"	Nick Copus	Brannon Braga & Adam Simon	April 5, 2015	2WAT01	0.510
15	2	"Blood Kiss"	Allan Arkush	Brannon Braga & Adam Simon	April 12, 2015	2WAT02	0.376
16	3	"From Within"	Alex Zakrzewski	Kelly Souders & Brian Peterson	April 19, 2015	2WAT03	0.495
17	4	"Book of Shadows"	Allan Kroeker	Joe Menosky & Adam Simon	April 26, 2015	2WAT04	0.331
18	5	"The Wine Dark Sea"	Peter Weller	Turi Meyer & Al Septien	May 3, 2015	2WAT05	0.334
19	6	"Ill Met by Moonlight"	Nick Copus	Brian Peterson & Kelly Souders	May 10, 2015	2WAT06	0.245
20	7	"The Beckoning Fair One"	Joe Dante	Donna Thorland & Adam Simon	May 17, 2015	2WAT07	0.321
21	8	"Dead Birds"	Alex Kalymnios	Joe Menosky & Adam Simon	May 24, 2015	2WAT08	0.310
22	9	"Wages of Sin"	David Grossman	Al Septien & Turi Meyer	May 31, 2015	2WAT09	0.394
23	10	"Til Death Do Us Part"	Tim Andrew	Kelly Souders & Brian Peterson	June 7, 2015	2WAT10	0.284
24	11	"On Earth as in Hell"	Nick Copus	Joe Menosky & Adam Simon	June 14, 2015	2WAT11	0.314
25	12	"Midnight Never Come"	Alex Zakrzewski	Donna Thorland & Adam Simon	June 21, 2015	2WAT12	0.318
26	13	"The Witching Hour"	Brannon Braga	Adam Simon	June 28, 2015	2WAT13	0.337

=== Season 3 (2016–17) ===
No. overall	No. in season	Title	Directed by	Written by	Original release date	Prod. code	U.S. viewers (millions)
27	1	"After the Fall"	Nick Copus	Brannon Braga & Adam Simon	November 2, 2016	3WAT01	0.272
28	2	"The Heart Is a Devil"	Tim Andrew	Adam Simon	November 9, 2016	3WAT02	0.212
29	3	"The Reckoning"	Wayne Yip	Kelly Souders & Brian Peterson	November 16, 2016	3WAT03	0.295
30	4	"Night's Black Agents"	Joe Dante	Joe Menosky & Donna Thorland	November 30, 2016	3WAT04	0.270
31	5	"The Witch Is Back"	Nick Copus	Adam Simon	December 7, 2016	3WAT05	0.257
32	6	"Wednesday's Child"	Peter Weller	Donna Thorland & Adam Simon	December 14, 2016	3WAT06	0.286
33	7	"The Man Who Was Thursday"	Jennifer Lynch	Brian Peterson & Kelly Souders	January 4, 2017	3WAT07	0.259
34	8	"Friday's Knights"	Nick Copus	Adam Simon & Donna Thorland	January 11, 2017	3WAT08	0.268
35	9	"Saturday Mourning"	Jennifer Lynch	Kelly Souders & Brian Peterson	January 18, 2017	3WAT09	0.236
36	10	"Black Sunday"	Brannon Braga	Adam Simon	January 25, 2017	3WAT10	0.233
