= Salem (TV series) =

2014 American historical fantasy drama television series

- Genre: Supernatural horror Drama; Thriller
- Created by: Brannon Braga; Adam Simon
- Starring: Janet Montgomery; Shane West; Seth Gabel; Tamzin Merchant; Ashley Madekwe; Elise Eberle; Iddo Goldberg; Xander Berkeley; Joe Doyle; Oliver Bell
- Theme music composer: Marilyn Manson; Tyler Bates
- Opening theme: "Cupid Carries a Gun"
- Composer: Tyler Bates
- Country of origin: United States
- Original language: English
- No. of seasons: 3
- No. of episodes: 36 (list of episodes)

Production
- Executive producers: Brannon Braga; David Von Ancken; Kelly Souders; Josh S. Barry; Jeff Kwatinetz; Joe Menosky; Elizabeth Sarnoff; Tricia Small; Adam Simon; Jon Harmon Feldman; Richard Shepard; Brian Wayne Peterson; Josh S. Barry
- Producers: Brannon Braga; Coby Greenberg; David Von Ancken; Danielle Weinstock
- Production location: Shreveport, Louisiana
- Cinematography: Mark Vargo; Michael Goi; Sarah Cawley
- Editors: Rick Tuber; Scott Boyd; Dan Liu; Carole Kravitz Aykanian; Monty DeGraff; John Duffy; Jo Francis; Nina Lucia; Misha Syeed
- Running time: 45–53 minutes
- Production companies: Beetlecod Productions; Prospect Park (2014–15); The Firm (2016–17); Fox 21 Television Studios (Note: Credited as Fox 21 for the first season)

Original release
- Network: WGN America
- Release: April 20, 2014 – January 25, 2017

Salem is an American supernatural horror television series created by Brannon Braga and Adam Simon for WGN America. Inspired by the Salem witch trials in the 17th century, the series stars Janet Montgomery as Mary Sibley, a witch whose control over the trials is threatened by the return of her former lover, John Alden, played by Shane West.

The series premiered on April 20, 2014, as WGN America's first original scripted drama. It was filmed in Shreveport, Louisiana, on sets built to represent 17th century Massachusetts. Salem ran for three seasons and 36 episodes, ending on January 25, 2017, after it was announced during the third season that the series would conclude. Critical response to the first season was mixed, with reviewers commenting on its Gothic style, historical liberties and supernatural treatment of the Salem witch trials.

== Premise ==
Set in 17th-century Salem, Massachusetts, Salem presents a fictionalized version of the Salem witch trials where witchcraft is real and the trials are manipulated by witches for their own purposes. The series centers on Mary Sibley, a powerful witch who has become one of the most influential figures in Salem society. Publicly, Mary is the wife of wealthy town leader George Sibley; secretly, she works to advance a plan that uses the fear and violence of the trials to summon the Devil.

Mary's plans are complicated by the return of John Alden, her former lover, who comes back to Salem after years away at war. His return forces Mary to confront her past while maintaining her control over the town. The series also follows Cotton Mather, a Puritan minister involved in the trials; Anne Hale, the daughter of a magistrate who discovers her own connection to witchcraft; Tituba, Mary's ally and servant; and Mercy Lewis, one of the afflicted girls whose accusations help fuel the hysteria.

The show combines supernatural horror, historical fantasy and Gothic romance, using people and events associated with the real Salem witch trials as the basis for a fictional story about power, religion, repression and revenge.

== Cast and characters ==
=== Main ===
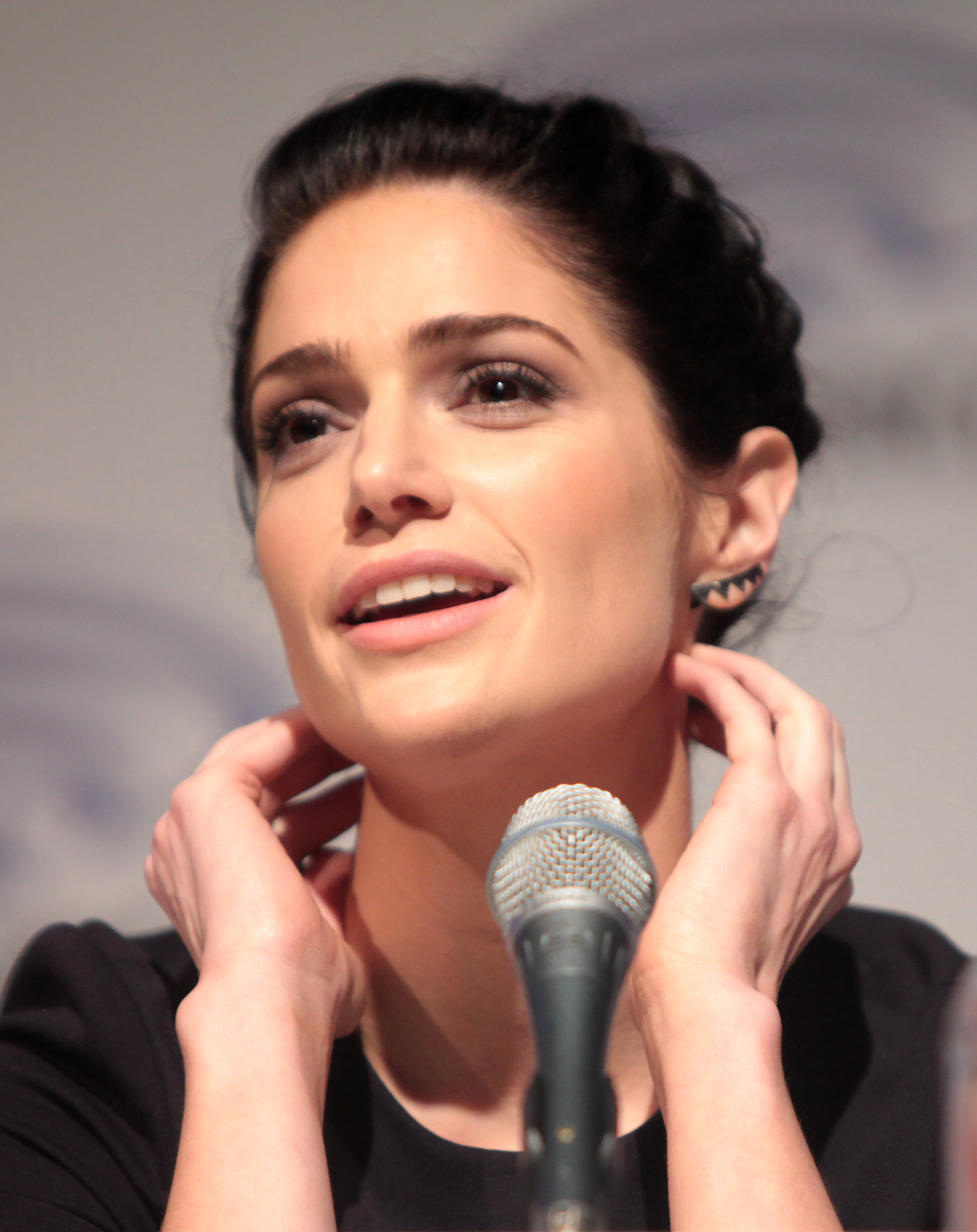
Janet Montgomery, who plays Mary Sibley

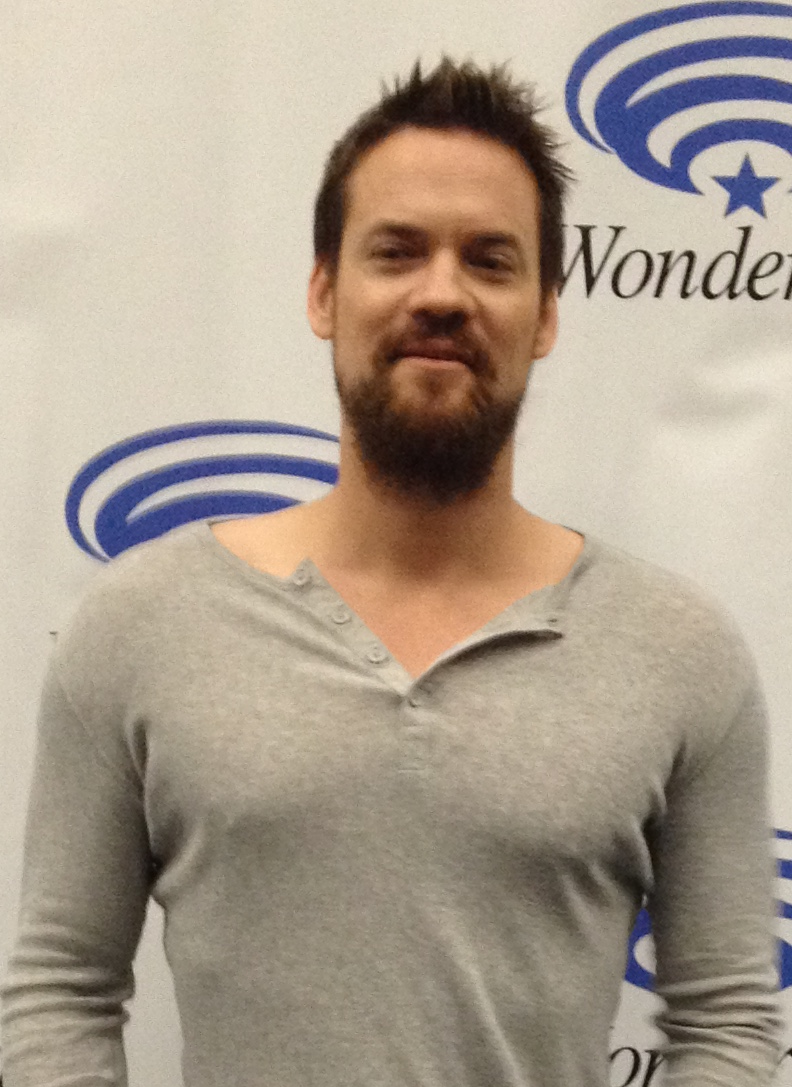
Shane West, who plays John Alden

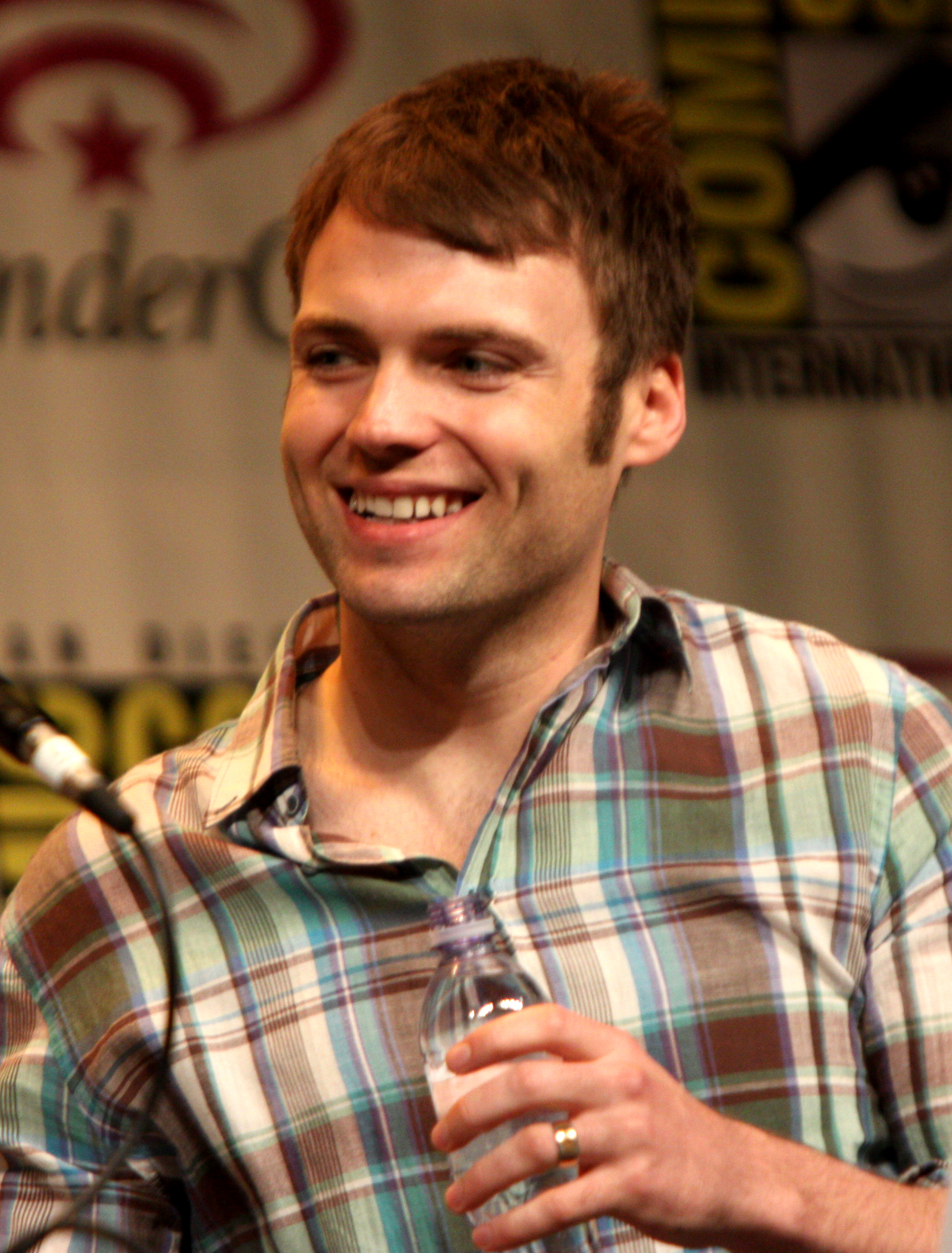
Seth Gabel, who plays Cotton Mather

- Janet Montgomery as Mary Walcott / Mary Sibley, a witch who uses her position in Salem to influence the trials
- Shane West as Captain John Alden, a war veteran and Mary's former lover who returns to Salem
- Seth Gabel as Cotton Mather, a Puritan minister involved in the witch trials
- Tamzin Merchant as Anne Hale, the daughter of Magistrate Hale
- Ashley Madekwe as Tituba, Mary's servant and ally
- Elise Eberle as Mercy Lewis, one of the afflicted girls in Salem
- Iddo Goldberg as Isaac Walton, a man in Salem who is branded as a fornicator
- Xander Berkeley as Magistrate Hale (season 1; guest season 2), a Salem magistrate and Anne's father
- Oliver Bell as John / the Devil / Samael (main seasons 2–3; guest season 1)
- Joe Doyle as Baron Sebastian von Marburg (seasons 2–3)

=== Recurring ===
- Michael Mulheren as George Sibley (seasons 1–2), Mary's husband
- Azure Parsons as Gloriana Embry (seasons 1 and 3)
- Sammi Hanratty as Dollie Trask (seasons 1–2)
- Stephen Lang as Increase Mather (season 1; guest seasons 2–3), Cotton Mather's father
- Lucy Lawless as Countess Palatine Ingrid Von Marburg (seasons 2–3), the head of the Marburg family
- Stuart Townsend as Dr. Samuel Wainwright (season 2)
- Samuel Roukin as the Sentinel / Beelzebub (season 3)
- Marilyn Manson as Thomas Dinley (season 3)

== Production ==
=== Development ===
The series first appeared as part of WGN America's development slate in July 2012, under the title Malice. On June 4, 2013, WGN America bypassed the pilot stage and placed a series order for 13 episodes, under the new title Salem. On November 8, 2013, filming of the series began in Shreveport, Louisiana, on an set built to resemble 17th-century Massachusetts. On May 5, 2014, WGN America renewed Salem for a 13-episode second season. On July 11, 2015, Salem was renewed for a 10-episode third season, with production beginning in Shreveport, Louisiana, in late 2015 with a 2016 debut. In December 2016, WGN America announced the series cancellation, with the third season concluding with the series finale on January 25, 2017.

=== Casting ===
Casting announcements began in October 2013, with Ashley Madekwe first cast in the role of Tituba. Seth Gabel was the next actor cast, in the regular role of Cotton Mather. Janet Montgomery and Xander Berkeley were cast in the lead role of Mary Sibley and the role of Magistrate Hale, respectively. Shane West signed onto the series in the regular role of John Alden, as did Tamzin Merchant as Anne Hale. Elise Eberle was later cast in the series regular role of Mercy Lewis. In the episode "Our Own Private America", which originally aired on June 1, 2014, Stephen Lang joined the cast in the recurring role of Increase Mather.

For the second season, Lucy Lawless and Stuart Townsend joined Salem in the recurring roles of Countess Marburg and Samuel Wainwright, respectively, while Joe Doyle and Oliver Bell joined the regular cast as Baron Sebastian Marburg and Mary's lost son, respectively. During the third season, singer Marilyn Manson joined the cast in a recurring role as barber and all-around problem solver Thomas Dinley.

=== Music ===
The majority of Salem's score was composed by Tyler Bates. Bates selected "Cupid Carries a Gun", a song he co-wrote with Marilyn Manson and recorded by the band for their album The Pale Emperor, as the show's title track.

== Episodes ==
Season	Episodes	Originally released	
Season	Episodes	First released	Last released
1	13	April 20, 2014	July 13, 2014
2	13	April 5, 2015	June 28, 2015
3	10	November 2, 2016	January 25, 2017

== Home media ==
The first season was released on DVD in the United States on October 28, 2014, by Fox Home Entertainment. The second season was released on DVD on April 5, 2016, and is manufactured by Amazon's CreateSpace MOD Program. As of November 2023, the third season has not been commercially released on DVD or Blu-ray in the United States. It was released on DVD in the United Kingdom and Australia, and the complete series was released in a boxed set in Australia.

== Reception ==
=== Critical reception ===
Salem scored 49 out of 100 based on 16 critic reviews on Metacritic, which the site characterizes as "mixed or average reviews". On Rotten Tomatoes, the first season scored 54% and an average rating of 5.5 out of 10 based on 26 critic reviews. The critical consensus reads: "While the horror scenes are well-executed, Salem lacks enough substance to sustain even a guilty-pleasure interest." Neil Genzlinger of The New York Times, upon reviewing the first season, said the show is "brash and well executed... perversely entertaining". He went on to say that "when Salem isn't being deliberately outrageous, it's cultivating a dynamic that could be fruitful as things move along. Here in the 21st century, science and reason rule, but in a world of sorcery, clinging to rationality just makes you stupid." Mark Dawidziak of The Plain Dealer gave the first few episodes a positive review, saying "Slowly drawing you into its heightened version of that Puritan community, Salem casts its spell with an opening episode that is a witch's brew of romance, fear, deceit, revenge, hysteria, evil and uncertainty." Zack Handlin of The A.V. Club called the series "a collection of shallow stock characters and ramshackle plotting" that attempts tacky exploitation of a tragedy. Brian Lowry wrote in Variety that although the series is not bad, it "plays like a rather flat supernatural soap".

=== Ratings ===
Season	Timeslot (ET)	Episodes	Premiered		Ended		Average viewers (in millions)
Season	Timeslot (ET)	Episodes	Date	Premiere viewers (in millions)	Date	Finale viewers (in millions)	Average viewers (in millions)
Season 1	Sundays 10/9c	13	April 20, 2014	1.52	July 13, 2014	0.43	1.7
Season 2	Sundays 10/9c	13	April 5, 2015	0.51	June 28, 2015	0.34	1.1
Season 3	Wednesdays 9/8c	10	November 2, 2016	0.27	January 18, 2017	0.23	TBA

The series premiere rose to 3.4 million viewers in Live+7 ratings, and had more than 1.5 million viewers in adults 18–49. The season two premiere rose 150% in adults 18–49 in Live+7 ratings, from 0.2 to 0.5, while it rose to 1.5 million viewers in Live+3. The second episode rose 300% from 0.1 to 0.4.

=== Awards and nominations ===
Year	Association	Category	Nominee(s)	Result
2015	Fangoria Chainsaw Awards	Favorite Actress on Television	Janet Montgomery	Nominated
2015	Saturn Awards	Best Syndicated/Cable Television Series	Salem	Nominated
2016	Fangoria Chainsaw Awards	Best TV Actress	Janet Montgomery	Nominated
2016	Fangoria Chainsaw Awards	Best TV Make-Up/Creature FX	Matthew Mungle, Clinton Wayne	Nominated
2016	Fangoria Chainsaw Awards	Best TV Series	Salem	Nominated
2016	Fangoria Chainsaw Awards	Best TV Supporting Actor	Seth Gabel	Nominated
2016	Fangoria Chainsaw Awards	Best TV Supporting Actress	Lucy Lawless	Nominated
2017	Fangoria Chainsaw Awards	Best TV SFX	Matthew Mungle, Clinton Wayne	Nominated
2017	Fangoria Chainsaw Awards	Best TV Supporting Actor	Seth Gabel	Nominated
2017	Fangoria Chainsaw Awards	Best TV Supporting Actress	Tamzin Merchant	Nominated
