= The American Nightmare (2000 film) =

- Directed by: Adam Simon
- Screenplay by: Adam Simon
- Produced by: Paula Jalfon; Colin McCabe; Jonathan Sehring
- Starring: George A. Romero; Wes Craven; Tom Savini; David Cronenberg; Tobe Hooper; John Carpenter
- Edited by: Paul Carlin
- Music by: Godspeed You Black Emperor!; Karlheinz Stockhausen
- Production company: Minerva Pictures
- Release date: September 2000 (Toronto International Film Festival)
- Running time: 75 minutes
- Country: United States

The American Nightmare is a 2000 documentary film directed and written by Adam Simon. The film documents the relationship between independent horror film directors such as George A. Romero, John Carpenter, Tobe Hooper and Wes Craven and their relationship between the political and social changes of the era and the horror films of that time. The film was shown at the 2000 Toronto International Film Festival and was shown later on the Independent Film Channel.

== Production ==
Writer Adam Simon stated he wrote the film for audiences who enjoyed The Blair Witch Project to put independent horror films of the 1960s and 1970s into context. Simon described the film as a "way to sneak a history lesson in to young people who love horror movies. In that sense, I hope it will inspire a younger generation to get busy again, both as filmmakers and as citizens. For me, in some ways, the most distressing part of the movie was being forced to recognize how much more radical the press was, the media was, and film was than it is now. That was kind of depressing." Legal rights problems prevented inclusion of some titles, including those in the “Friday the 13th” series.

== Release ==
The American Nightmare was shown at the Toronto International Film Festival in September 2000. The film was shown on the Independent Film Channel shortly after in October 2000. The film was released on DVD on March 20, 2004.

== Reception ==
"GM" of Time Out described the film as a "thorough, intelligent and stylish study of the superior brand of horror movies that emerged from America in the late '60s and '70s." and that the film was "Good solid stuff, though given some of the academic work done on how the films relate to concepts of family, ritual, sexual politics and so on, you sometimes feel the makers might have probed a little deeper." Brian J. Dillard of AllMovie compared the film to Terror in the Aisles noting that while that film "merely strung together the money shots from a wide variety of horror films" that American Nightmare "takes a specific subset of this enduring genre and convincingly argues a case about its historical context and sociological significance." The review concluded that the documentary "offers an appealing mixture of meticulous research, historical anecdote, and twisted humor."

Eddie Cockrell of Variety found that "Simon infuses pic with the same nervous enthusiasm displayed by the genre’s fans" as well as that "the sheer ambition of docu’s structure is also its downfall. Arbitrary and too-cute title cards (“Home Is Where the Hearts Are,” “Staying Alive”) butt up against inconsistent year markers, with pic losing much of its head after about an hour."
