= Brain Dead (1990 film) =

- Theatrical release poster
- Directed by: Adam Simon
- Written by: Charles Beaumont; Adam Simon
- Produced by: Julie Corman; Lynn Whitney
- Starring: Bill Pullman; Bill Paxton; Bud Cort; Patricia Charbonneau; Nicholas Pryor; George Kennedy
- Cinematography: Ronn Schmidt
- Edited by: Carol Oblath
- Music by: Peter Rotter
- Distributed by: Concorde Pictures
- Release date: January 19, 1990 (United States)
- Running time: 85 minutes
- Country: United States
- Language: English
- Box office: $1.6 million

Brain Dead is a 1989 psychological horror-thriller film directed by Adam Simon. It stars Bill Pullman, Bill Paxton, and George Kennedy.

== Plot ==
Dr. Rex Martin is a top neurosurgeon, who is active in studying brain malfunctions that cause mental illnesses. The film opens with him walking into his office, the 8 on his laboratory turned on its side in an infinity symbol. His assistant, Berkovitch, is playing games with a removed brain, connected to a separated face, using his tool to map out the facial muscles in the brain. After Rex takes over, Berkovitch accidentally knocks over Philip Montag's brain, a parietal paralysis patient. Rex jokes that the place won't be the same without him.

High school friend Jim Reston, a successful businessman at Eunice, shows up at Rex's office. He requires Martin's aid in reaching the mind of John Halsey, a former genius mathematician who once worked for the company and is now a paranoid psychotic at a nearby asylum. Halsey destroyed his results before losing his mind and is thought to be faking his disorder to keep it out of the hands of his employer. Dr. Martin meets with Halsey, who is convinced that a man named Conklin is spying on him and intends to kill him. Dr. Martin convinces Halsey to go through his tests and it is revealed that he is indeed paranoid.

Jim Reston attempts to convince Martin to operate on Halsey to no real avail, revealing that Martin's work is already being funded by Eunice in the first place, so he'll have more leeway to operate on Halsey. Dr. Martin's surgery is intended to successfully alter the patient's mental attitude, either unlocking the corporate secrets within Halsey's brain or else leaving Halsey unable to accidentally share them with anyone else. However, after leaving his meeting with Reston, Martin is carrying a jarred brain home from the office, when a homeless man attacks him, convinced he's carrying his brain. In the struggle, Martin loses his grip on the brain, causing it to fly through the air. At the same moment, he's run over by a car—revealed to be from the Conklin Mattress Company—and hits his head on the windshield, cracking it in the process.

Martin comes to in his hallway, once again spinning the infinity symbol back to an upright 8. He finds that he's lost his grant and is losing his lab. He kicks out the scientists, only for one to pull down all the jars on the wall. Martin wakes up, but his wife doesn't know about the car accident. Even Martin isn't sure if it was earlier in the day or when it happened. We learn that Halsey killed his wife, two kids, and three research assistants. Martin convinces Halsey to undergo the procedure, which is set up in a boardroom. During the surgery, we see through Halsey's eyes what each stimulation changes, altering not only the location, sounds, and people involved while still allowing him to communicate through the psychosis. The surgery seems to be a success, restoring Halsey's sanity and getting him to recognize that he is a mathematician.

After Martin finishes the surgical procedure, he starts to experience the same paranoid dreams as Halsey, seeing Conklin in the surgical room after the fact. These episodes grow in intensity until it becomes unclear whether Martin is a doctor imagining he's the patient, or a mental patient who succumbed to the delusion that he was a brain surgeon.

In the end, it is revealed that Martin died from the injuries sustained in the car wreck and is now a sentient brain in a jar.

== Cast ==
- Bill Pullman as Dr. Rex Martin
- Bill Paxton as Jim Reston
- Bud Cort as Jack Halsey
- Nicholas Pryor as Man In Bloody White Suit / Ramsen / Ed Conklin
- Patricia Charbonneau as Dana Martin
- George Kennedy as Vance
- Brian Brophy as Ellis
- David Sinaiko as Berkovitch
- Andy Wood as The Brain Surgeon
- Maud Winchester as Anna "Crazy Anna"
- Brent Hinkley as Dewey
- Lee Arenberg as Sacks
- Kyle Gass as Anaesthetist

== Production ==
In the late 1980s, Julie Corman got summer interns to go through several hundred old scripts. The best one they discovered was one written by Charles Beaumont for Roger Corman in the 1960s. Director Adam Simon liked it and updated it for modern times.

== Reception ==
As of October 2019, the film held an overall score of 17% on review aggregator website Rotten Tomatoes based on reviews by 6 critics.
