= Duke City Shootout =

American competitive film festival

The Duke City Shootout is a script-to-screen movie-making contest. The Shootout and the 48 Hour Film Project were cited in MovieMaker Magazine as "pioneers of the marathon movie-making competition." The competition was begun in 2000 in Albuquerque, New Mexico, under the name Flicks on 66, and briefly changed to DigiFest Southwest, before settling on the current name.

Each year, the Shootout conducts an international competition for short scripts, 12 minutes or shorter, and selects seven to produce during the competition, held annually in July. Selected competitors are brought to Albuquerque and have one week to shoot, edit and premiere their finished movie. The festival provides equipment, crews, cast, locations, editing facilities, mentors and everything necessary for the competitors to complete their movies. The movies are screened before a live audience on the final night of the event.

In 2009 the Shootout went on a brief hiatus before resuming the competition the following year.

The Shootout has also incorporated other movie-making contests since its inception. In 2006 and 2007, it partnered with the 48 Hour Film Project and hosted its own MiniCini to help aspiring filmmakers create nearly 50 additional shorts during the week.

== See also ==
- 48 Hour Film Project
- List of film festivals
- Shoot Out 24-Hour Filmmaking Festival, Newcastle, Australia (1999–2008)
