= Oliver Bell =

American actor (born 2004)

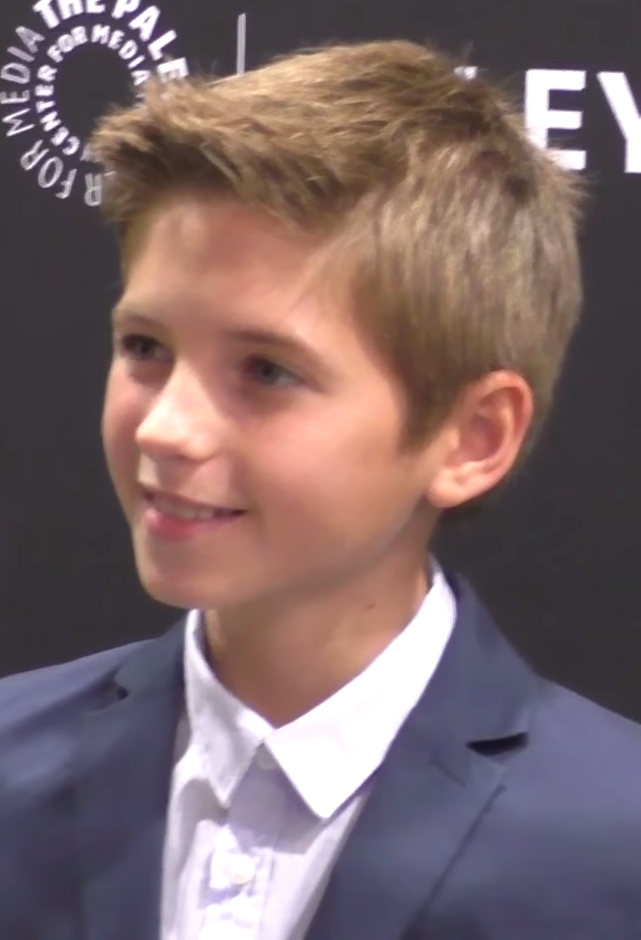
- Bell in 2016
- Born: May 13, 2004 (age 22); Florida, United States
- Occupation: Actor
- Years active: 2012–present

Oliver Bell (born May 13, 2004) is an American actor. He began his professional acting career at the age of eight. He is best known for his role as Little John/the Devil on the WGN America series Salem, and Little Boy in the HBO sci-fi series Westworld.

== Personal life ==
Bell was born in Florida, United States. He is of a Scottish/English descent.

Oliver is the son of champion British race car driver Justin Bell and the grandson of five time Le Mans winning sports car driver Derek Bell.

== Career ==
Bell played the role of 'Young Richard' in the movie Some Kind of Beautiful. He also appeared as a main role in the show Salem, playing the role of 'Little Jon'. In 2016 he played the role of 'Little Boy' in the HBO series Westworld.

== Filmography ==
=== Film ===
Title	Year	Role	Director	Notes	Ref(s)
Some Kind of Beautiful	2014	Young Richard	Tom Vaughan		

=== Television ===
Title	Year	Role	Network	Notes	Ref(s)
The Sidekick	2013	Bubble Gum Boy	ABS	Short	
The Neighbors	2013	Nicolas Kemper	ABC	1 episode	
Blessed, Our Father	2013	Sam		Short	
Salem	2014–2017	Little John/the Devil	WGN	Main role	
Once Upon a Time	2015	Young Killian Jones	ABC	1 episode	
The Magicians	2016	George	Syfy	1 episode	
Westworld	2016–2018	Young Robert Ford/Little Boy	HBO	5 episodes	
The Saint	2016	Young Simon Templar		TV movie	
Doc McStuffins	2017	Christopher Robin	Disney Junior	1 episode, voice role	
