= Elise Eberle =

American actress

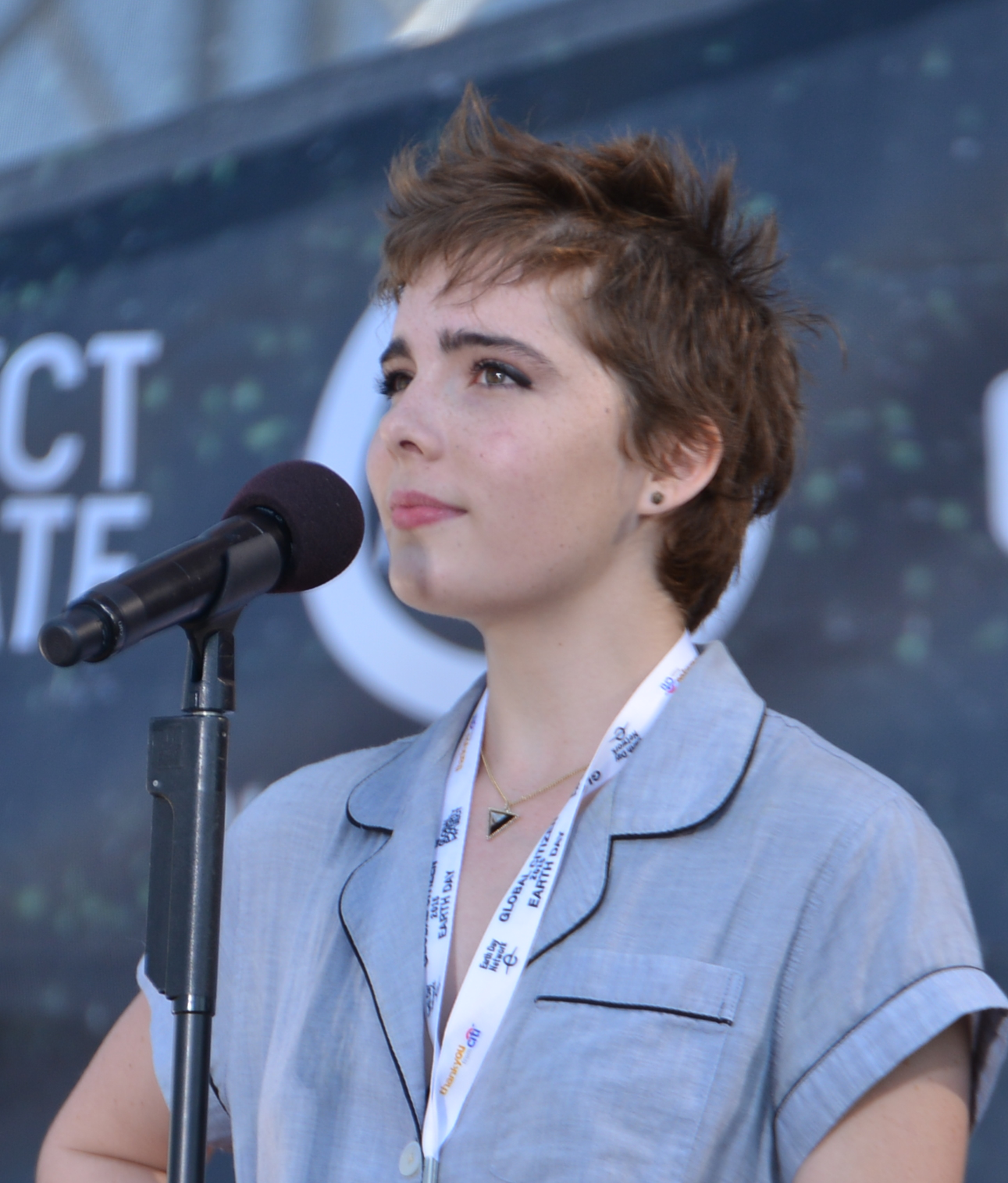
- Eberle in 2015
- Occupation: Actress
- Years active: 2005–present
- Notable work: Tiger Eyes
- Television: Salem; Shameless; The Last Tycoon
- Website: elisekeberle.com

Elise Eberle is an American actress known for her roles in television series such as Salem (2014–2017), Shameless (2011–2021), and The Last Tycoon (2016–2017). She gained prominence for portraying Mercy Lewis in the horror series Salem.

== Career ==
=== Early roles (2005–2013) ===
Eberle began her acting career in 2005 with a role in a short film directed by Angie Comer. She appeared in minor roles in films such as The Astronaut Farmer (2006) and Wild Hogs (2007). In 2007, she won the Best Actress award at New Mexico's 48 Hour Film Project for her performance in the short film Teardrop. Eberle also had a small role in the Disney Channel television film Lemonade Mouth (2011), directed by Patricia Riggen.

Her film debut came with a role in Drake Doremus' Breathe In, which premiered at the Sundance Film Festival in 2013. She also appeared in adaptations of Tiger Eyes and As Cool As I Am during this period.

=== Breakthrough and television (2014–present) ===
Eberle's breakthrough role was as Mercy Lewis in the WGN America series Salem (2014–2017). She described the character as complex, likening her to a "bipolar, almost schizophrenic girl" due to the range of emotions portrayed, and noted the extensive makeup preparation required for the role. Her performance earned her praise and increased her visibility, with recognition from outlets like Rolling Stone and The Wall Street Journal after her move to Los Angeles.

Following Salem, Eberle appeared in recurring roles in Shameless (2011–2021) and The Last Tycoon (2016–2017). She also featured in The Lumineers' music video for "Sleep on the Floor" and has pursued modeling and painting, showcasing her artwork through limited-edition prints on her personal website.

== Filmography ==
=== Film ===
Year	Title	Role	Notes	Ref.
2005	Confessions of a Reluctant Bra Buyer	Rose	Short	
2006	The Astronaut Farmer	Madison Roberts		
2007	Wild Hogs	Family Kid		
2007	Teardrop	Ester	Short	
2008	Girl Alone	Susan	Short	
2008	Breaking In	Addie Smith	Short	
2009	Love N' Dancing	Brianna		
2009	A Lucky Break	Valerie		
2009	After School	Del	Short	
2011	Lemonade Mouth	Nicol Garcia		
2012	Tiger Eyes	Jane Albertson		
2013	As Cool as I Am	Jaimie Tilton		
2014	Chasing the Devil	Hailey Tynan		
2019	A Call to Spy	Serena		
2021	Portal Runner	Mae		
2023	Bump	Lady	Short	
2024	Fowl Play		Short	

=== Television ===
Year	Title	Role	Notes	Ref.
2011	Shameless Hall of Shame	Sandy Milkovich	1;episode	
2014	Rizzoli & Isles	Natasha Osmanski	1;episode	
2014–17	Salem	Mercy Lewis	36;episode	
2017	The Last Tycoon	Kitty	3;episode	
2019–2021	Shameless	Sandy Milkovich		
2022	NCIS	Arlene Wilkes	1;episode	

Remember
†	Denotes works that have not yet been released

=== Music videos ===
Year	Title	Artist(s)	Ref.
2016	Sleep on the Floor	The Lumineers	
2013	Dots and Dashes (Enough Already)	Silversun Pickups	

== Awards and nominations ==
Year	Award	Category	Result	Ref.
2005	48 Hour Film Project	Best Actress	Won	
2005	Duke City Shootout	Best Actress	Won	
