= Iddo Goldberg =

Israeli actor (born 1975)

- עדו גולדברג
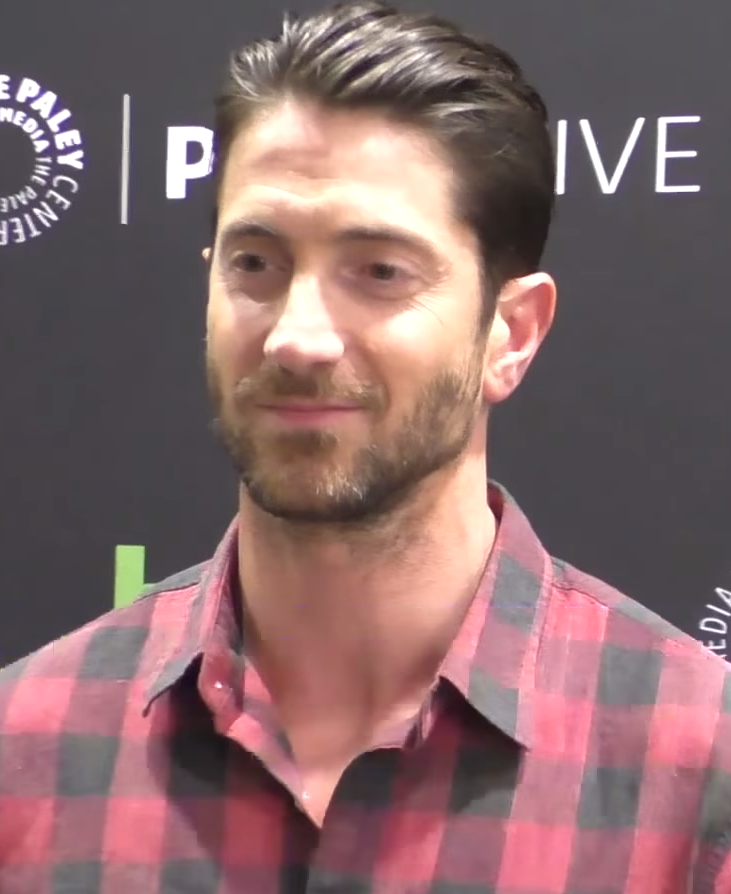
- Goldberg in 2016
- Born: 5 August 1975 (age 51); Haifa, Israel
- Occupation: Actor
- Years active: 1995–present
- Spouse: Ashley Madekwe (m. 2012)
- Children: 1

Iddo Goldberg (Hebrew: עדו גולדברג; born 5 August 1975) is an Israeli actor, known for his roles as Ben in Secret Diary of a Call Girl (2007–2011), Freddie Thorne in Peaky Blinders (2013), Isaac Walton in Salem (2014–2017), and Bennett Knox in Snowpiercer (2020–2024).

== Early life ==
Goldberg was born in Haifa, Israel, to Jewish parents; his mother's family hailed from Jerusalem and his father was born in Riga, Latvia. He moved to London with his family at the age of 10. During the 1930s, his father's family tried to move to South Africa, but South Africa's Jewish immigration quota was full, and their entry was denied. Instead, they emigrated to Northern Rhodesia (present-day Zambia); he later attended a British university and obtained a degree in architecture. His parents first met when his father arrived in Israel to visit his twin brother, who was residing there. He also has relatives in Haifa, Israel.

== Career ==
Goldberg has had several notable roles, including Brandon in the two series of Attachments and Ben on Secret Diary of a Call Girl; where his then girlfriend, and later wife, Ashley Madekwe also had a regular role. He appeared as semi-regular 15Peter20 in Chris Morris and Charlie Brooker's comedy Nathan Barley. He also appeared in the 2008 war film Defiance.

In 2013 Goldberg starred as Freddie Thorne in the first series of the BBC Two crime drama Peaky Blinders. He co-starred in the 2012 film And While We Were Here.

In addition to a Tumblr account that features his photographs, Goldberg makes short films that are posted there. He directed the short Supper (2012) with Joey Slotnick and Lauren Katz and music videos by James Rousseau, Anyone (Acoustic/Live) (2012) and Hair of the Dog (2012). Goldberg made a film, about his maternal grandmother, called Luba (2010).

In 2015 he appeared in the music video for the Disclosure song "Magnets" alongside Lorde.

Goldberg played villain T. O. Morrow and his android Red Tornado in the CBS series Supergirl in 2015. Between 2014 and 2017 he starred in Salem, alongside his wife, Ashley Madekwe.

== Personal life ==
He married English actress Ashley Madekwe in June 2012. They have worked together on Secret Diary of a Call Girl, and he also had a role alongside her on the TV series Salem. In April 2023, Madekwe announced that they were expecting their first child.

Goldberg stated his support for Israel following the October 7 attacks. He is one of the signatories of an open letter by the Creative Community For Peace criticising reports on Palestinian genocide as causing acts of antisemitism.

== Filmography ==
=== Film ===
Year	Title	Role	Notes
1998	Fast Food	Junkie	
2002	L'Auberge Espagnole	Alistair	
2004	Suzie Gold	Anthony Silver	
2004	The Defender	Scripts	
2005	A Little Trip to Heaven	Russle	
2005	Dead Fish	Thief	
2006	Bye Bye Harry!	Ian	
2006	Are You Ready for Love?	Benjamin	
2007	I Could Never Be Your Woman	Director	
2007	Run Fatboy Run	News reporter	
2008	Defiance	Yitzhak Shulman	
2009	Unmade Beds	Mike	
2009	The Tournament	Tech Rob	
2010	The Tourist	Jones' assistant Whitfield	
2012	And While We Were Here	Leonard	
2013	Last Passenger	Jan Klimowski	
2017	The Zookeeper's Wife	Maurycy Fraenkel	
2018	Driven	Roy	
2023	Fear	Michael	
2026	The Odyssey	Amphimedon	

=== Television ===
Year	Title	Role	Notes
1998	The Bill	Kevin Baxter	Episode: "Bad Chemistry"
1999	Jesus	Seth	Television film
2000	Holby City	Simon Martin	Episode: "Letting Go"
2000	The Bill	Wayne Stevens	Episode: "Beyond Conviction"
2000–2001	Attachments	Brandon	13 episodes
2001	Uprising	Zygmunt Frydrych	Television film
2004	Little Britain	Tennis partner	Episode: "#2.5"
2005	Nathan Barley	15Peter20	3 episodes
2005	Last Rights	Sol	3 episodes
2007	Skins	William	Episode: "Jal"
2007	The Relief of Belsen	Emmanuel Fisher	Television film
2007–2011	Secret Diary of a Call Girl	Ben	31 episodes
2009	The Courageous Heart of Irena Sendler	Jakub Rozenfeld	Television film
2011	Waking the Dead	Tom Harding	2 episodes
2011	Christopher and His Kind	Wilfred Landauer	Television film
2012	Jan	Hugh	Episode: "Wine Bar"
2012	The Mentalist	Tony Redgrave	Episode: "Red Is the New Black"
2013	NCIS	Yaniv Bodnar	Episode: "Berlin"
2013	Peaky Blinders	Freddie Thorne	6 episodes
2013	Mob City	Leslie Shermer	5 episodes
2014–2017	Salem	Isaac Walton	34 episodes
2015	Tut	Lagus	3 episodes
2015	Bar Rescue	Himself	Episode: "Brokedown Palace"
2015	Supergirl	T.O. Morrow / Red Tornado	Episode: "Red Faced"
2017	The Last Tycoon	Fritz Lang	5 episodes
2017–2018	Get Shorty	Max Kisbye	5 episodes
2018	Genius	Leo Stein	2 episodes
2020	Westworld	Sebastian	3 episodes
2020–2024	Snowpiercer	Bennett Knox	Main role
2023	Ghosts of Beirut	Teddy	2 episodes
TBA	The Siege †	TBA	Upcoming drama series

=== Web ===
Year	Title	Artist	Notes
2017	Freedom Fighters: The Ray	Earth-X Red Tornado	Recurring (voice role); 3 episodes

=== Music videos ===
Year	Title	Artist	Notes
1999	"Secretly"	Skunk Anansie	
2003	"Under the Thumb"	Amy Studt	
2015	"Magnets"	Disclosure feat. Lorde	
