= Brian Wayne Peterson =

American television producer and screenwriter

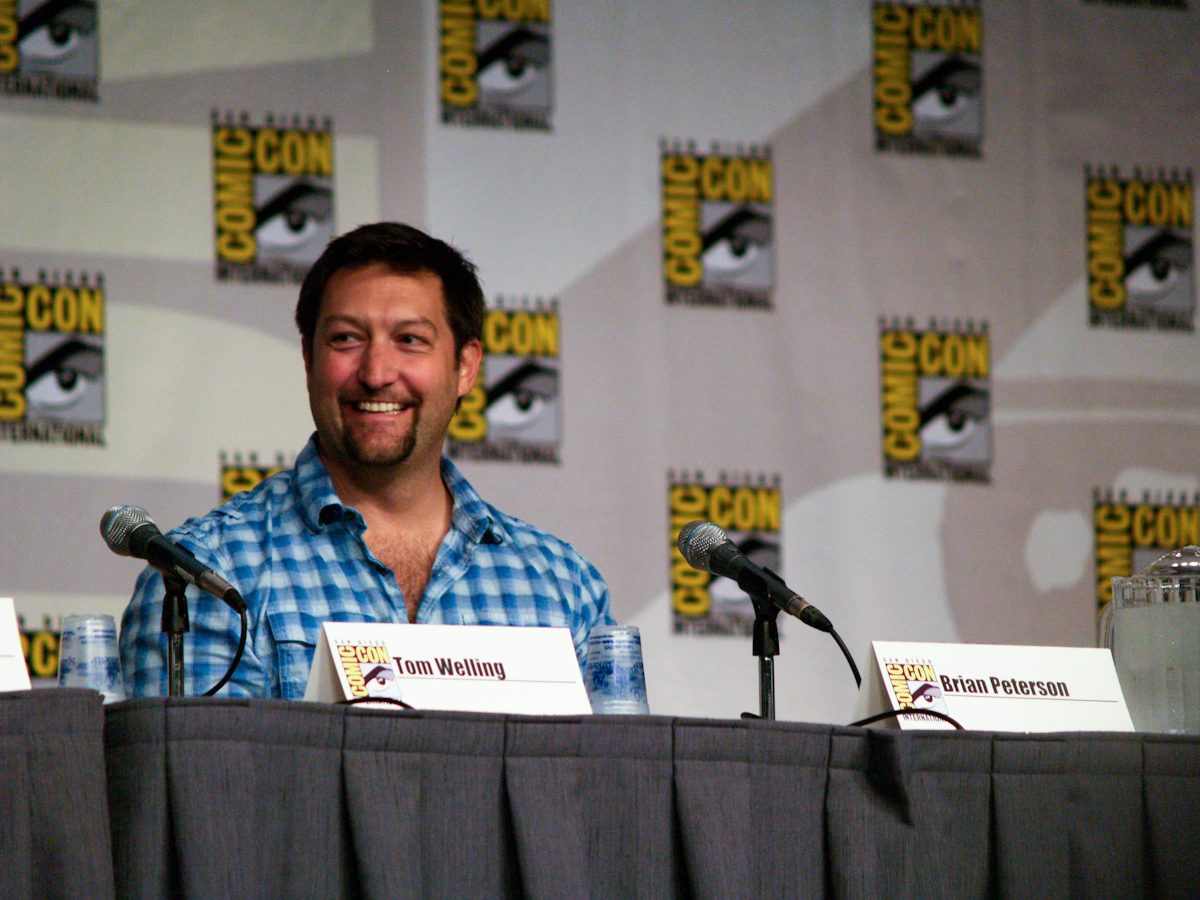
- Peterson at 2010 Smallville Comic-Con panel
- Born: 1971 or 1972 (age 53–54); United States
- Occupation(s): Screenwriter, television producer

Brian Wayne Peterson (born c. 1971/1972) is an American screenwriter, television producer, and showrunner. After finding success writing the script for 1999 film But I'm a Cheerleader, he and his writing partner Kelly Souders wrote and produced the television series Smallville, Beauty and the Beast, Salem, Genius, and The Hot Zone.

== Biography ==
Peterson received a Master of Fine Arts in writing for screen and television from the USC School of Cinematic Arts in 1997. It was here that he met Souders, where the two decided to form their writing partnership.

Shortly after his graduation, Jamie Babbit, the director for But I'm a Cheerleader, asked Peterson to write a script for her film after reading a story he had written about a gay cowboy. Peterson used his experience for the story, which is about a group of teenagers who attend conversion therapy camp. He is gay himself and had experience with conversion therapy while working at a prison clinic for sex offenders. In 1999, Variety named him one of 10 Screenwriters to Watch.

Peterson and Souders renewed their deal with Fox 21 Television Studios in August 2018. Their next project, The Hot Zone, tells the true story of the Reston virus in the US in 1989. It will be released on National Geographic on Memorial Day 2019. In 2012 Peterson and Souders were nominated for an Online Film and Television Association (OFTA) Television Award for Best Writing of a Motion Picture of Miniseries for Political Animals (2012).

== Filmography ==
=== Film ===
- But I'm a Cheerleader (1999)

=== Television ===
- Beauty and the Beast (2012–2013)
- Genius (2017–2018)
- The Hot Zone (2019)
- Political Animals (2012)
- Salem (2015–2017)
- Smallville (2002–2011)
- Under the Dome (2014)
