= Tamzin Merchant =

British actress

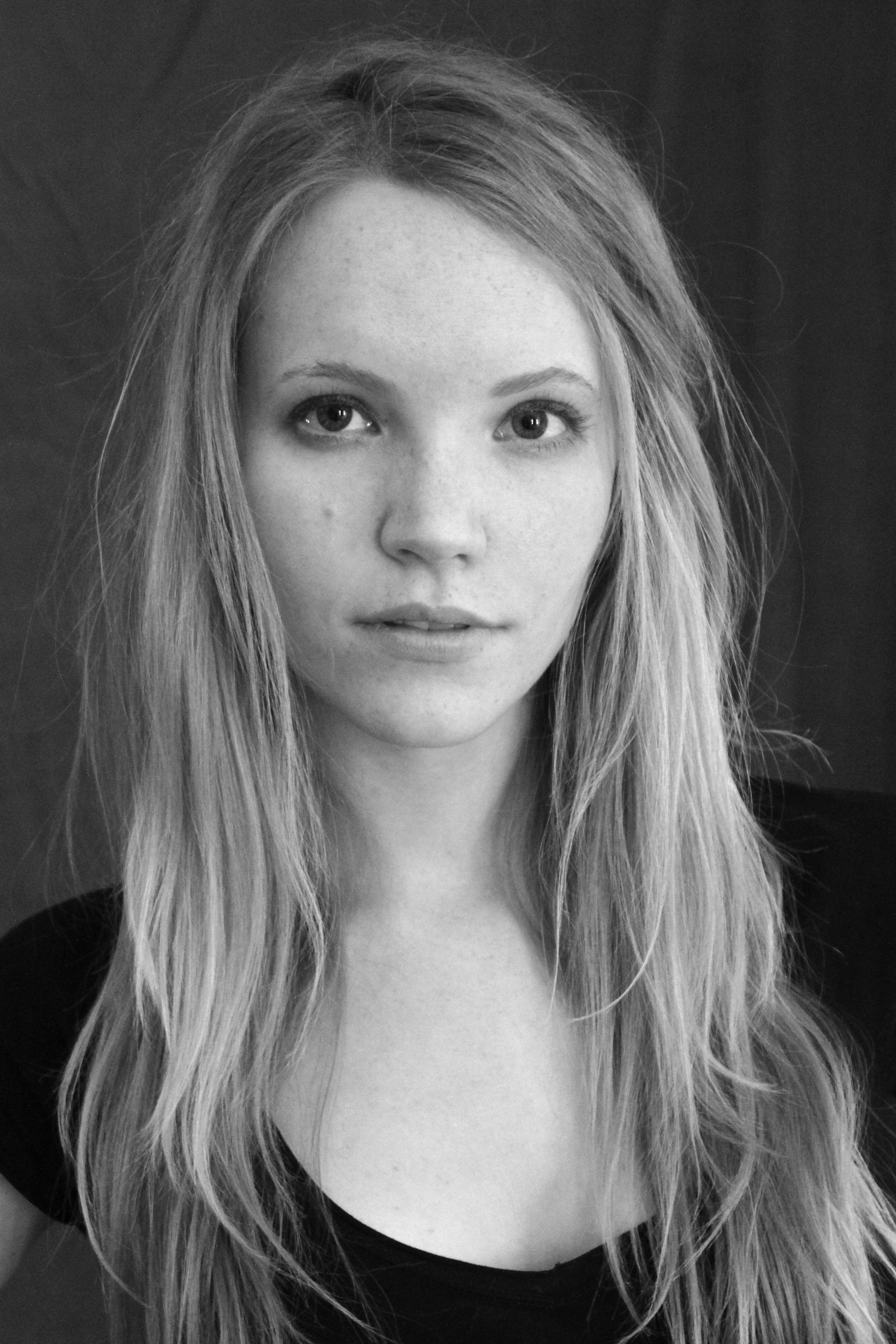
- Merchant in 2011
- Born: Tamzin Claire Merchant; 4 March 1987 (age 39); Haywards Heath, Sussex, England
- Education: Homerton College, Cambridge
- Occupations: Actress and author
- Years active: 2004–present

Tamzin Claire Merchant (born 4 March 1987) is an English actress and author. She is most notable for her roles as Georgiana Darcy in the film Pride & Prejudice (2005), as Catherine Howard in The Tudors (2009–2010) and as Anne Hale in Salem (2014–2017).

== Early life ==
Merchant was born 4 March 1987, in Haywards Heath, Sussex, England. She was educated at Windlesham House School and Brighton College, although she has also lived in Dubai, United Arab Emirates. After twice deferring university places to concentrate on her acting career, she eventually studied English and Drama with Education at Homerton College, Cambridge.

== Career ==
Merchant's early credits include Margo Durrell in the 2005 BBC television film My Family and Other Animals, and Georgiana Darcy in the 2005 film Pride and Prejudice. In 2006 she appeared in two more BBC dramas, as Sara Fox, the daughter of Alan Davies and Michelle Gomez, in the comedy The Good Housekeeping Guide, and as Probationer Eastwood in the historical drama Casualty 1900s.

In 2007, while studying at the University of Cambridge, she performed in an audio production of Lady Windermere's Fan as Lady Agatha, while in 2008 she appeared in the ensemble drama Radio Cape Cod in which she plays a summer theatre camper. She appears in the music video for Jamie T's "If You've Got The Money" and in Belle and Sebastian's "Nobody's Empire". In 2009, she played Alice Davies in Princess Kaiulani.

She was cast playing Catherine Howard, the fifth wife of Henry VIII, in the third-season and its finale and features heavily in several episodes of the fourth (and final) season of The Tudors (2009).

Merchant played Daenerys Targaryen in the unaired pilot of the HBO series Game of Thrones, based on George R. R. Martin's A Song of Ice and Fire series of fantasy novels. The pilot was poorly received, and as a result the first episode was completely remade. Merchant was replaced in her role as Daenerys by Emilia Clarke.

She played Miranda in the DCI Banks episodes "Playing with Fire - Part 1" and "Playing with Fire - Part 2". In early 2012, Merchant played the 17-year-old Rosa Bud in the BBC adaptation of Charles Dickens' The Mystery of Edwin Drood.

Merchant was a series regular for 3 seasons of Salem on WGN America from 2014 to 2017.

In 2019 Merchant was cast as a series regular on the Amazon Prime series Carnival Row. The series premiered on 30 August and was renewed for a second season.

In 2020, she starred as Lucy the lead role in the multi-award winning short film Gifts of the Heart, for which she won The Cutting Room International Short Film Festival Best Actress in a Short (CRISFF Award).

In 2025, she starred alongside John Malkovich, Sean Bean, Miranda Richardson, and Anton Lesser in the biographical drama film: The Yellow Tie.

== Other work ==
She wrote the children's book The Hatmakers (2021). Following this, she wrote and published three more books: The Mapmakers (2023), The Troublemakers (2024), The Mythmakers (2025).

== Filmography ==
=== Film ===
Year	Title	Role	Notes
2005	Pride & Prejudice	Georgiana Darcy	
2008	Radio Cape Cod	Anna	
2009	Princess Kaiulani	Alice Davies	
2011	Jane Eyre	Mary Rivers	
2011	Red Faction: Origins	Lyra Mason	
2012	Second Wind	Anna	
2014	Copenhagen	Sandra	
2015	Dragonheart 3: The Sorcerer's Curse	Rhonu	Direct-to-video film
2015	The Messenger	Sarah	
2016	The Dancer	Kate	
2017	Dragonheart: Battle for the Heartfire	Queen Rhonu	Direct-to-video film
2020	Running Naked	Sara	
2020	Gifts of the Heart	Lucy	Short film
2022	A Midsummer Night's Dream	Helena	
2022	James and Lucia	Helen Fleischmann-Joyce	
2025	The Yellow Tie	Ortancia	

=== Television ===
Year	Title	Role	Notes
2005	My Family and Other Animals	Margo Durrell	Television film
2006	The Good Housekeeping Guide	Sara Fox	Television film
2006	Casualty 1906	Probationer Eastwood	Television film
2008	Bonekickers	Helena	Episode: "Army of God"
2009–2010	The Tudors	Catherine Howard	Main role (seasons 3–4), 6 episodes
2009	Game of Thrones	Daenerys Targaryen	Unaired pilot
2011	Red_Faction: Origins	Lyra	Television film
2011	DCI Banks	Miranda Aspern	Episodes: "Playing with Fire - Part 1", "Playing with Fire - Part 2"
2012	The Mystery of Edwin Drood	Rosa Bud	Television film (2 parts)
2013	Murder on the Home Front	Molly Cooper	Television film
2014–2017	Salem	Anne Hale	Main role Nominated—Fangoria Chainsaw Award - Best TV Supporting Actress (2017)
2017	Supergirl	Lyra Strayd	Recurring role, 5 episodes
2019	Thanks for the Memories	Joyce Conway	2 episodes (the entire film)
2019–2023	Carnival Row	Imogen Spurnrose	Main role
2023	Tom Jones	Aunt Harriet	4 episodes

=== Music videos ===
Year	Title	Artist
2006	"If You Got the Money"	Jamie T
2007	"Song 4 Mutya (Out of Control)"	Groove Armada feat Mutya Buena
2014	"Nobody's Empire"	Belle and Sebastian

== Stage ==
Year	Title	Role	Notes
2008	Hay Fever	Jackie	Queens' College, Cambridge
2008	Dahling You Were Marvellous	Sister 3, Hanger-on	ADC Theatre
2009	Breakfast at Night	Chorus	ADC Theatre
2009	The 24hr Plays	Group 1 Producer	ADC Theatre
2010	Cigarettes and Chocolate	Gemma	ADC Theatre

== Awards and nominations ==
Year	Award	Category	Nominated work	Result	Ref.
2017	Fangoria Chainsaw Awards	Best TV Supporting Actress	Salem	Nominated	
2017	Oxford International Film Festival (OXIFF)	Best Screenplay	Juliet Remembered	Won	
2020	Global Independent Film Awards	Best Actress in a Lead Role (Bronze)	Gift of the Heart (short)	Nominated	
2020	The Cutting Room International Short Film Festival	Best Actress in a Short (CRISFF Award)	Gift of the Heart (short)	Won	
