= Mercy Lewis =

Accuser of the Salem witch trials

- Born: c. 1674 or 1675; Massachusetts Bay Colony
- Occupation: Maidservant
- Known for: Accuser in the Salem witch trials

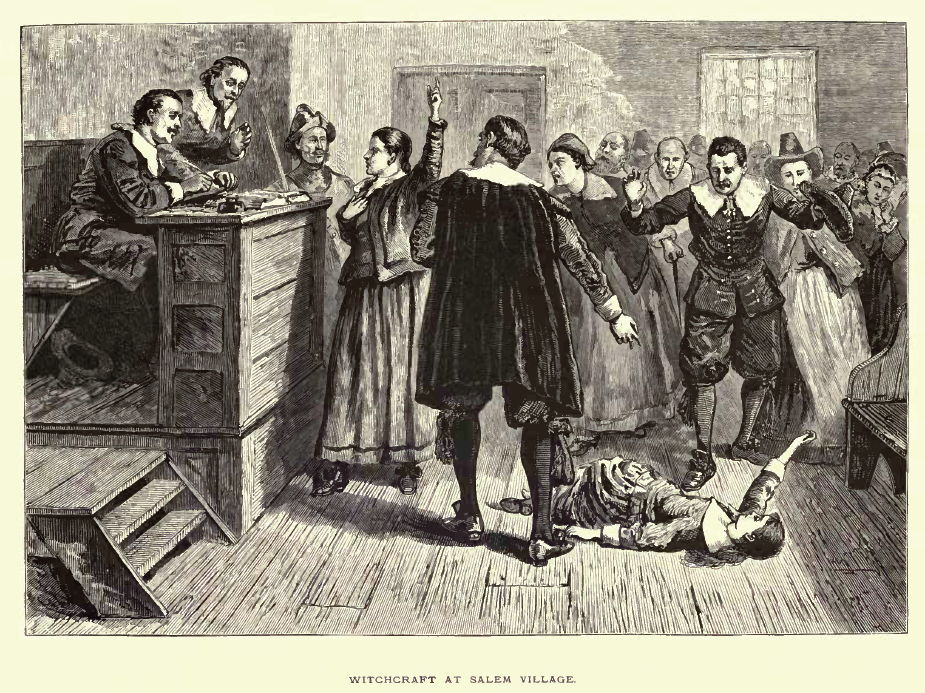
1876 illustration of the courtroom; the central figure is usually identified as Mary Walcott

Mercy Lewis (fl. 1692) was an accuser during the Salem Witch Trials. She was born in Falmouth, Maine. Mercy Lewis, formally known as Mercy Allen, was the child of Philip Lewis and Mary (Cass) Lewis.

== Early life ==
Lewis and her family were refugees seeking out protection after an attack on her village by Native Americans during King Philip's War. Her family first stayed in Casco Bay, an inlet of the Gulf of Maine, New England, with other refugees. Rev. George Burroughs, a Puritan minister who served in Salem, Massachusetts from 1680–83, was also one of the survivors of the attack by the Native Americans.

The Lewis family next settled in Salem. Mercy Lewis's uncle, Thomas Skilling, died from an injury brought on by the Native American attack. In 1683, the Lewis family traveled back to the island in Casco Bay. The second attack of the Native Americans in 1689 resulted in the death of Mercy's parents and made her an orphan.

On September 30, 1689, an attack by Native Americans killed her grandparents, aunts, uncles and most of her cousins. As a result, the 14-year-old Mercy was placed as a servant in the household of Rev. Burroughs. By 1691, she had moved back to Salem, where a married sister was living; she became a servant in Thomas Putnam's household.

== Salem Witch Trials ==
Lewis played a crucial role during the Salem witch trials in 1692, when 20 people were executed for witchcraft, including her former master, George Burroughs. Like the accusation placed on Elizabeth Proctor on March 26, 1692, Mercy was accountable for hindering Mary Eastey's release from prosecution and eventual execution after all other charges against Eastey had been dropped. Accusations were made against Elizabeth Proctor that she tormented both Abigail Williams and Mercy Lewis in their homes.

It is reported that Mercy Lewis was a victim of child abuse after statements were taken from witnesses such as Abigail Williams and Thomas Putnam.

As a member of the Putnam household, Lewis became friends with Ann Putnam, Jr. and her cousin Mary Walcott. Putnam and Walcott's accusations would help launch the witch hysteria. In early April 1692, Lewis claimed that Satan had appeared to her, offering her "gold and many fine things" if she would write in his book; shortly thereafter, Satan appeared to her in the form of Burroughs, who she reported "carried me up to an exceeding high mountain and showed me all the kingdoms of the earth, and told me that he would give them all to me if I would write in his book."

No information or medical history was recorded on the mental state of Mercy Lewis during the Salem witch trials. However, it was reported that Mercy suffered from episodes of seizures. One record stated that Lewis had a violent seizure on May 7, 1692, after experiencing torture and threats from Burroughs. This act was brought on by Lewis's refusal to print her name in a book Reverend Burroughs owned in order to clearly state her allegiance to him.

Lewis also accused Mary Esty, sister of Rebecca Nurse, who would be tried and hanged. Others accused by Lewis include Giles Corey, Bridget Bishop, Susannah Martin, John Willard, and Sarah Wildes. Lewis was the subject of accusations. Ann Putnam Jr. claimed she had seen Lewis' apparition, though she said it had not harmed her.

After the trials, Mercy moved to Boston to live with her aunt. There she bore an illegitimate son. By 1701, she had married a Mr. Allen in Boston.

== Fiction ==
Lewis is one of the featured characters in Arthur Miller's play (and later film) The Crucible. She is also a character in the 2014 TV series Salem, portrayed by Elise Eberle. Porpentina Goldstein used Mercy Lewis’ name as an expression of surprise and shock in the movie Fantastic Beasts and Where to Find Them. In the 2020 video game Death end re;Quest 2, there is a character named Mercy Lewis. Though she does not get accused of witchcraft in the game, her name could be a reference to the character in the play since the game has themes that are inspired by Christianity.

== Sources ==
- Boyer, Paul; Nissenbaum, Stephen (1974). Salem possessed the social origins of witchcraft (24 ed.). Cambridge, Massachusetts: Harvard University Press. ISBN 978-0674785267.
- Hale, John (2008). A modest enquiry into the nature of witchcraft [and how persons guilty of that crime may be convicted : and the means used for their discovery discussed, both negatively and affimatively, according to Scripture and experience]. Bedford, Mass.: Applewood Books. ISBN 978-1557091826.
- Karlsen, Carol F. (1998). The devil in the shape of a woman : witchcraft in colonial New England. New York, NY [u.a.]: Norton. ISBN 978-0393317596.
- Norton, Mary Beth (2002). In the devil's snare : the Salem witchcraft crisis of 1692 (1st ed.). New York: Alfred A. Knopf. ISBN 978-0965460972.
- Rosenthal, Bernard (1993). Salem story : reading the witch trials of 1692. Cambridge: Cambridge Univ. Press. ISBN 978-0521440615.
- Torrey, Clarence Almon (1985). New England marriages prior to 1700. Baltimore, Md.: Genealogical Pub. Co. ISBN 978-0806311029.
- Upham, Charles W. (1867).
- Salem Witchcraft at Project Gutenberg
