= Ashley Madekwe =

English actress (born 1983)

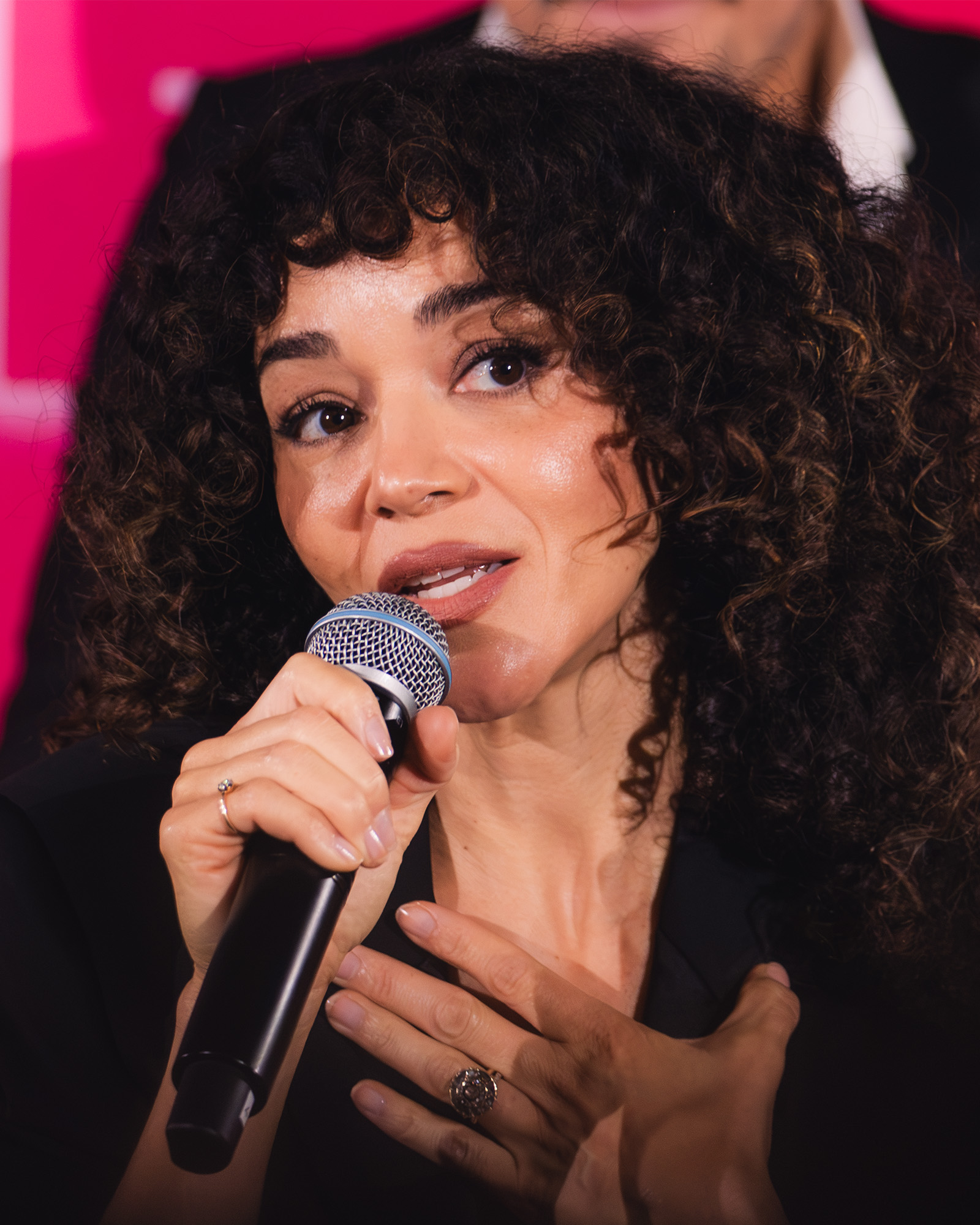
- Madekwe in 2026
- Born: 6 December 1983 (age 42); Mile End, London, England
- Education: RADA
- Occupation: Actress
- Years active: 1998–present
- Spouse: Iddo Goldberg (m. 2012)
- Children: 1
- Relatives: Archie Madekwe (cousin)

Ashley Madekwe (/məˈdɛkweɪ/; born 6 December 1983) is an English actress. On television, she is known for her roles the ITV2 series Secret Diary of a Call Girl (2008–2010), the ABC drama Revenge (2011–2013), and the WGN series Salem (2014–2017). For her performance in County Lines (2019), Madekwe was nominated for the BAFTA for Best Supporting Actress. Her other films include Victim (2011) and The Strays (2023).

== Early life ==
Madekwe was born at Mile End Hospital in East London to a Nigerian father and an English mother, and grew up on a South London council estate in West Norwood. When she was 14, her family moved to the Norbury suburbs, and Madekwe attended the BRIT School. She went on to train at the Royal Academy of Dramatic Art (RADA) in London.

Her cousin is fellow actor Archie Madekwe.

== Career ==
Madekwe started her acting career with a film titled Storm Damage. In 2005, shortly after graduating from Royal Academy of Dramatic Art she played 'Jade' in Shan Khan's Prayer Room at Birmingham Repertory Theatre. She subsequently made guest appearances in the Channel 4 series Teachers, the BBC One soap operas Doctors Casualty, and the BBC Three series Drop Dead Gorgeous. Madekwe made her feature film debut in the 2007 Woody Allen film Cassandra's Dream, opposite Colin Farrell and Ewan McGregor. Following that success, she played Elisha in the one-off BBC Three drama pilot West 10 LDN, and appeared in six episodes of Trexx and Flipside as Ollie. In 2008, she landed the role of Bambi on the ITV2 drama series Secret Diary of a Call Girl, appearing in series two and three. Madekwe starred in the 2008 comedy film How to Lose Friends & Alienate People. Her theatre credits include Little Sweet Thing by Roy Williams and Flight Path by David Watson.

Madekwe made her official US debut in the 2009 drama series The Beautiful Life, which only aired two episodes on The CW before being cancelled. In February 2011, she was cast as Ashley Davenport in the ABC drama series Revenge. After being a regular for the first two seasons, it was reported in late May 2013 that Madekwe would depart the series following a guest appearance in the first episode of the third season. She starred as Tituba in the television series Salem from 2014 to 2016.

In 2018 Madekwe starred in the British film, County Lines, and was subsequently nominated for a BAFTA in 2021 for the role of Toni.

== Personal life ==
In June 2012, Madekwe married her long-time boyfriend, Israeli actor Iddo Goldberg. They worked together on Secret Diary of a Call Girl and he also had a role alongside her on the TV series Salem. In late summer 2023, the couple welcomed their first child, a boy.

== Filmography ==
=== Film ===
Year	Title	Role	Notes
2006	Venus	Royal Court actress	
2007	Cassandra's Dream	Lucy	
2008	How to Lose Friends & Alienate People	Vicky	
2011	Victim	Tia	
2019	County Lines	Toni	Nominated—BAFTA Award for Best Actress in a Supporting Role; Nominated—British Independent Film Award for Best Supporting Actress
2023	The Strays	Neve / Cheryl Blake	Netflix film

=== Television ===
Year	Title	Role	Notes
1999	The Bill	Janie Newton	Episode: "Badlands"
2000	Hope and Glory	Dawn	Episode: "2.4"
2000	Down to Earth	Julie	Episode: "O Best Beloved"
2000	Storm Damage	Annalise	Television film
2001–2002	Teachers	Bev	9 episodes
2006	Vital Signs	Tart	Episode: "1.5"
2006	Doctors	Sophie Wells	Episode: "A Mother's Love"
2006	Casualty	Jade Clark	Episode: "Worlds Apart"
2006	Prime Suspect	Tanya	Episode: "The Final Act, Part 1"
2007	Drop Dead Gorgeous	Brogan Tully	3 episodes
2008	West 10 LDN	Elisha	Pilot
2008	Trial & Retribution	Maria	Episode: "Tracks: Part 1"
2008–2010	Secret Diary of a Call Girl	Bambi/Gloria White	13 episodes
2008	Trexx and Flipside	Ollie	8 episodes
2008	Wallander	Dolores Maria Santana	Episode: "Sidetracked"
2009	The Beautiful Life: TBL	Marissa Delfina	4 episodes
2009	Coming Up	Shanna	Episode: "Raising Baby Rio"
2010	Above Their Station	Kelly Eve	Pilot
2011	Bedlam	Molly Lucas	6 episodes
2011–2013	Revenge	Ashley Davenport	44 episodes
2014–2017	Salem	Tituba	34 episodes
2019	The Umbrella Academy	Detective Eudora Patch	3 episodes
2019	Four Weddings and a Funeral	Julia	4 episodes
2019–2020	Tell Me A Story	Simone Garland	10 episodes
2021	Tell Me Your Secrets	Lisa	5 episodes
2022	Made for Love	Zelda	6 episodes
2023	Dr. Death	Dr. Ana Lasbrey	Main role, season 2
