= Seth Gabel =

American actor (born 1981)

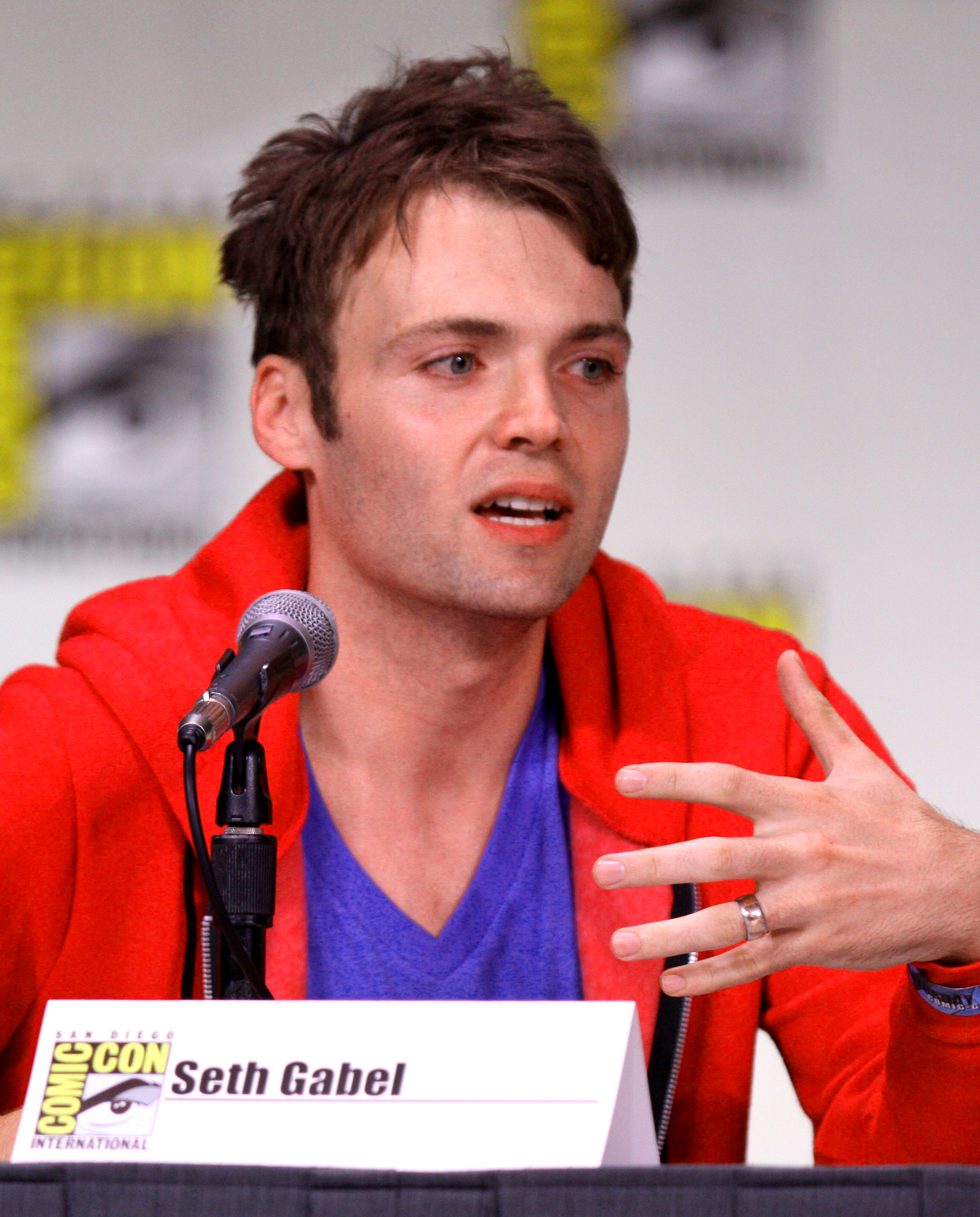
- Gabel in 2011
- Born: October 3, 1981 (age 45); Hollywood, Florida, U.S.
- Other name: Seth Cosentino
- Education: New York University (BFA)
- Occupation: Actor
- Years active: 1999–present
- Spouse: Bryce Dallas Howard (m. 2006)
- Children: 2
- Family: Ron Howard (father-in-law); Paige Howard (sister-in-law); Martin Gabel (great-uncle); Arlene Francis (great-aunt); Peter Gabel (first cousin once removed)

Seth Gabel (born October 3, 1981) is an American actor. He is known for his roles of Liam Glasser on The Rookie, agent Lincoln Lee on Fox's television series Fringe, Cotton Mather on WGN America's series Salem, and Adrian Moore on the FX series Nip/Tuck. He is a grand-nephew of actor Martin Gabel.

== Early life and education ==
Gabel was born to a Jewish family in Hollywood, Florida. He was raised under the surname of his stepfather, who adopted him, Cosentino. He finished his high school from University School of Nova Southeastern University in Davie, Florida, in 1999 and from New York University's Tisch School of the Arts. It was during his youth that he met his best friend Josh Gad.

== Career ==
Gabel starred in the Universal Pictures coming-of-age drama, Take Me Home Tonight and appeared in the 2006 film version of Dan Brown’s novel, The Da Vinci Code, directed by his father-in-law, Ron Howard. Television credits include recurring and guest starring roles on United States of Tara, The Closer, Law & Order: Special Victims Unit, CSI: Crime Scene Investigation, Sex and the City, and 100 Centre Street, directed by Sidney Lumet. He starred in Dirty Sexy Money as Jeremy Darling, the charming, rebellious, and exceedingly idiosyncratic son of the privileged and powerful Darling family, and the fraternal twin of socialite Juliet Darling, played by Samaire Armstrong.

Gabel won praise for his portrayal of Adrian Moore, the sexually confused adopted son of Ava Moore (portrayed by Famke Janssen) on the FX series Nip/Tuck. The story arc depicting their incestuous and emotionally abusive relationship garnered much attention.

Gabel first appeared on the FOX series Fringe during the 2010–11 TV season. He was promoted to the main cast for the fourth season. The character was written off at the end of that season before returning briefly for the series finale.

On January 30, 2013, Gabel was cast in the episode "Vertigo" of the series Arrow as a character based on Count Vertigo, known as the Count. He played Cotton Mather in Salem. In 2015, Gabel was cast as Jeffrey Dahmer in American Horror Story: Hotel. In 2019 he appeared in an episode of Showtime’s Billions opposite Damian Lewis.

== Personal life ==
Gabel met actress Bryce Dallas Howard at New York University, and they dated for five years before marrying on June 17, 2006, in Greenwich, Connecticut. They have two children, born in 2007 and 2012.

== Filmography ==
=== Film ===
Year	Title	Role	Notes
2001	A Beautiful Mind	Harvard student	Uncredited
2002	Tadpole	Mike	Uncredited
2006	The Da Vinci Code	Michael	
2008	Good Dick	Kissing Man	
2009	Jerry	Jerry's Friend #2	Short film
2010	Jonah Hex	Adviser	
2011	Take Me Home Tonight	Brent Tufford	
2012	Allegiance	Lt. Danny Sefton	
2015	Forever	Luke	

=== Television ===
Year	Title	Role	Notes
2002	100 Centre Street	James Bass	Episode: "It's About Love"
2002	Sex and the City	Sweet Young Sailor	Episode: "Anchors Away"
2003	The Lyon's Den	Beau Van Hessche	Episode: "Beach House"
2004	The Division	Mikhail Ominsky	Episode: "Acts of Desperation"
2004	Nip/Tuck	Adrian Moore	5 episodes
2004	CSI: Crime Scene Investigation	Gavin "Rex" Layne	Episode: "Formalities"
2005	Law & Order: Special Victims Unit	Garrett Perle	Episode: "Game"
2005	The Closer	Nikolai Koslov	Episode: "The Big Picture"
2006	Beyond	David Wuhlman	Television movie
2007–2009	Dirty Sexy Money	Jeremy Darling	23 episodes
2010	CSI: Crime Scene Investigation	Larry Colton	Episode: "Unshockable"
2010	United States of Tara	Zach	4 episodes
2010–2013	Fringe	Lincoln Lee	34 episodes
2013	Arrow	Count Vertigo	3 episodes
2013	Gothica	Roderick Usher	Unsold TV pilot
2014–2017	Salem	Cotton Mather	36 episodes
2015	Celebrity Name Game	Himself	3 episodes
2015–2016	American Horror Story: Hotel	Jeffrey Dahmer	2 episodes
2017	Genius: Einstein	Michele Besso	6 episodes
2018	Genius: Picasso	Guillaume Apollinaire	Episode: “Chapter 1”
2019	Billions	John Rice	Episode: "A Proper Sendoff"
2022–2023	American Horror Stories	Pastor Walter	Episode: "Milkmaids"
2022–2023	American Horror Stories	Guy Brubaker	Episode: "Bestie"
2022	The Watcher	Andrew Pierce	5 episodes
2022	Big Sky	Walter	12 episodes
2023	The Mandalorian	Bartender Droid (voice)	Episode: "Chapter 22: Gun for Hire"
2025–2026	The Rookie	Liam Glasser	6 episodes
2026	American Horror Story: 13	Jeffrey Dahmer	2 episodes

=== Video games ===
Year	Title	Voice role
2021	Maquette	Michael

== Awards and nominations ==
Year	Association	Category	Nominated work	Result
2011	Saturn Awards	Best Guest Starring Role on Television	Fringe	Nominated
2016	Fangoria Chainsaw Awards	Best Supporting Actor on Television	Salem	Nominated
2017	Fangoria Chainsaw Awards	Best Supporting Actor on Television	Salem	Nominated
