= Brannon Braga =

American television producer, director, and screenwriter

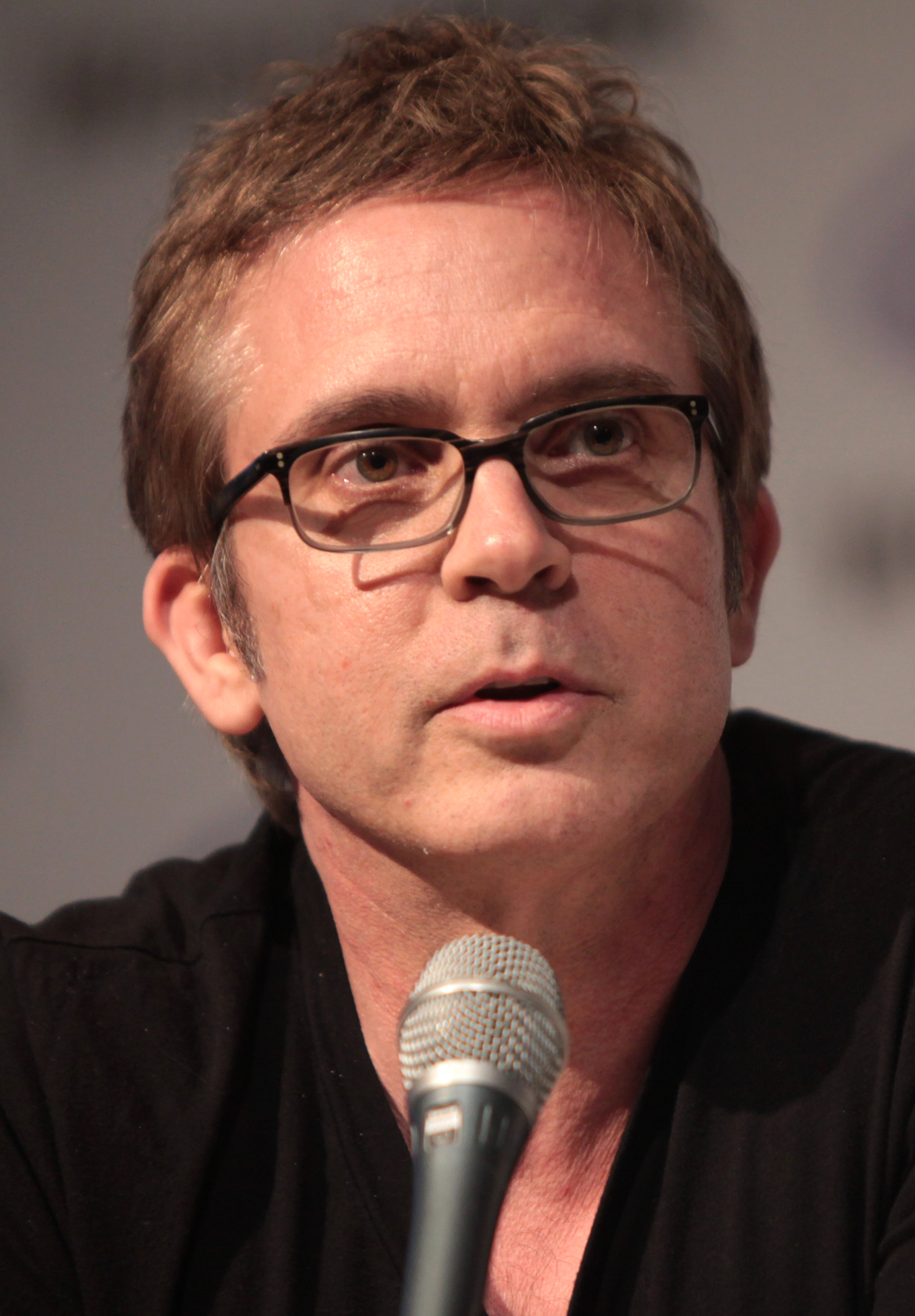
- Braga in 2015
- Born: August 14, 1965 (age 61); Bozeman, Montana, United States
- Occupations: Television producer, screenwriter

Brannon Braga (/ˈbrɑːɡə/; born August 14, 1965) is an American television producer, director and screenwriter. Best known for his work in the Star Trek franchise, Braga was a key creative force behind three of the franchise's live action television series, (Note: Star Trek: The Next Generation (1990–1994), Star Trek: Voyager (1995–2001), and Star Trek: Enterprise (2001–2005)) and is credited for writing on a total of 107 episodes—the most of any writer in Star Trek's history. He later became an executive producer and writer on several Fox shows including 24, Terra Nova, and The Orville. His film credits include Mission: Impossible 2, Star Trek Generations, Star Trek: First Contact, and Books of Blood.

He served as an executive producer on the Fox primetime series Cosmos: A Spacetime Odyssey, a re-launch of the 1980 miniseries hosted by Carl Sagan for which Braga won a Peabody Award, Critics Choice Award, and Producers Guild Award. In addition, Braga has been nominated for three Emmy Awards. Braga also served as writer, executive producer, and co-creator of the drama series Salem, WGN America's first original series.

== Career ==
Braga started out as an intern on Star Trek: The Next Generation in 1990 as part of the Television Academy Foundation's internship program, eventually becoming a co-producer for the series' final season. He was part of the creative team nominated for a Primetime Emmy Award in 1994 for Outstanding Drama Series, and won the Hugo Award for Best Dramatic Presentation in 1995 for his work on the series finale, "All Good Things..." along with longtime collaborator Ronald D. Moore. His credits on that series include a number of popular episodes including "Cause and Effect", "Frame of Mind" and "Parallels".

He then joined Star Trek: Voyager as a producer and was tapped to serve as executive producer the following year. He served as showrunner for Voyager until the end of the sixth season when he moved to Star Trek: Enterprise. He teamed up with Moore to write two Star Trek feature films – Star Trek Generations and Star Trek: First Contact. They would also later develop the Mission: Impossible 2 screenplay. He went on to co-create Star Trek: Enterprise and led that series as executive producer until its fourth and final season.

Before the cancellation of Star Trek: Enterprise, Braga co-created the CBS science fiction drama series Threshold, he was brought on as an executive producer and writer on the Fox series, 24, penning episodes in the seventh and eight seasons. He was also an executive producer and writer on the 2009 ABC science fiction series FlashForward.

While at the helm of Terra Nova, Braga was approached to co-write a four-part comic book series Star Trek: The Next Generation: Hive for IDW, which made its debut in 2012.

Braga was the producer and one of the directors of the 2014 science education series Cosmos: A Spacetime Odyssey, a sequel to the 1980 series Cosmos: A Personal Voyage that was hosted by Carl Sagan. The project saw Braga collaborating with the original series' writer and Sagan's widow, Ann Druyan, executive producer Seth MacFarlane and host Neil DeGrasse Tyson. The 13-episode series premiered March 9, 2014, and received mostly positive reaction from critics and viewers. Braga was nominated for an Emmy for his work on the show. The following month saw the premiere of the historical fantasy drama television series Salem, which Braga co-created with Adam Simon, and on which he serves as one of the executive producers. in 2014, he directed the Marilyn Manson music video "Cupid Carries a Gun" off The Pale Emperor album.

Braga is one of the producers of The Orville, a 2017 science fiction comedy drama inspired by Star Trek. He also directed several episodes of the series.

== Personal life ==
Braga is an atheist.

Braga attended Kent State University and the University of California, Santa Cruz, studying Theater Arts and Filmmaking.

During production of Star Trek: Voyager, Braga dated star Jeri Ryan for several years after she joined the cast in the fourth season. Between February and November 2000, they were stalked by Marlon Estacio Pagtakhan, who was convicted for harassment and threats in May 2001. Braga gave a speech at the International Atheist Conference in Reykjavík, Iceland in 2006, where he discussed mythologies, specifically the atheistic future for humanity that Gene Roddenberry imagined in Star Trek.

== Filmography ==
Film

Year	Title	Director	Writer	Executive producer
1994	Star Trek Generations	No	Yes	No
1996	Star Trek: First Contact	No	Yes	No
2000	Mission: Impossible 2	No	Story	No
2020	Books of Blood	Yes	Yes	Yes
2024	Bob Trevino Likes It	No	No	Yes

Television

Year	Title	Creator	Director	Producer	Writer	Executive producer	Notes
1990–94	Star Trek: The Next Generation	No	No	Co-	Yes (21)	No	Staff writer (season 5: 21 episodes); Story editor (season 6); Co-producer (season 7)
1995–2001	Star Trek: Voyager	No	No	Yes	Yes (49)	Yes	Producer season 1: 14 episodes, season 2: 4 episodes); Supervising producer season 2: 22 episodes, season 3); Co-executive producer (season 4); Executive producer (seasons 5–6, season 7: 1 episode Consulting producer (season 7: 25 episodes)
2001–05	Star Trek: Enterprise	Yes	No	No	Yes (38)	Yes	
2005–06	Threshold	No	No	No	Yes (1)	Yes	
2008	24: Redemption	No	No	No	No	No	Television film Co-executive producer
2009–10	24	No	No	No	Yes (16)	Yes	Co-executive producer (season 7); Executive producer (season 8)
2009–10	FlashForward	Yes	No	No	Yes (2)	Yes	
2011	Terra Nova	No	No	No	Yes (3)	Yes	
2014	Cosmos: A Spacetime Odyssey	No	Yes (8)	No	No	Yes	
2014–17	Salem	Yes	Yes (2)	Yes	Yes (8)	Yes	
2017–22	The Orville	No	Yes (4)	No	Yes (7)	Yes	
2020	Cosmos: Possible Worlds	No	Yes (7)	No	Yes (11)	Yes	
2022	The End Is Nye	No	Yes	No	Yes	Yes	
