= Adam Simon =

American film director

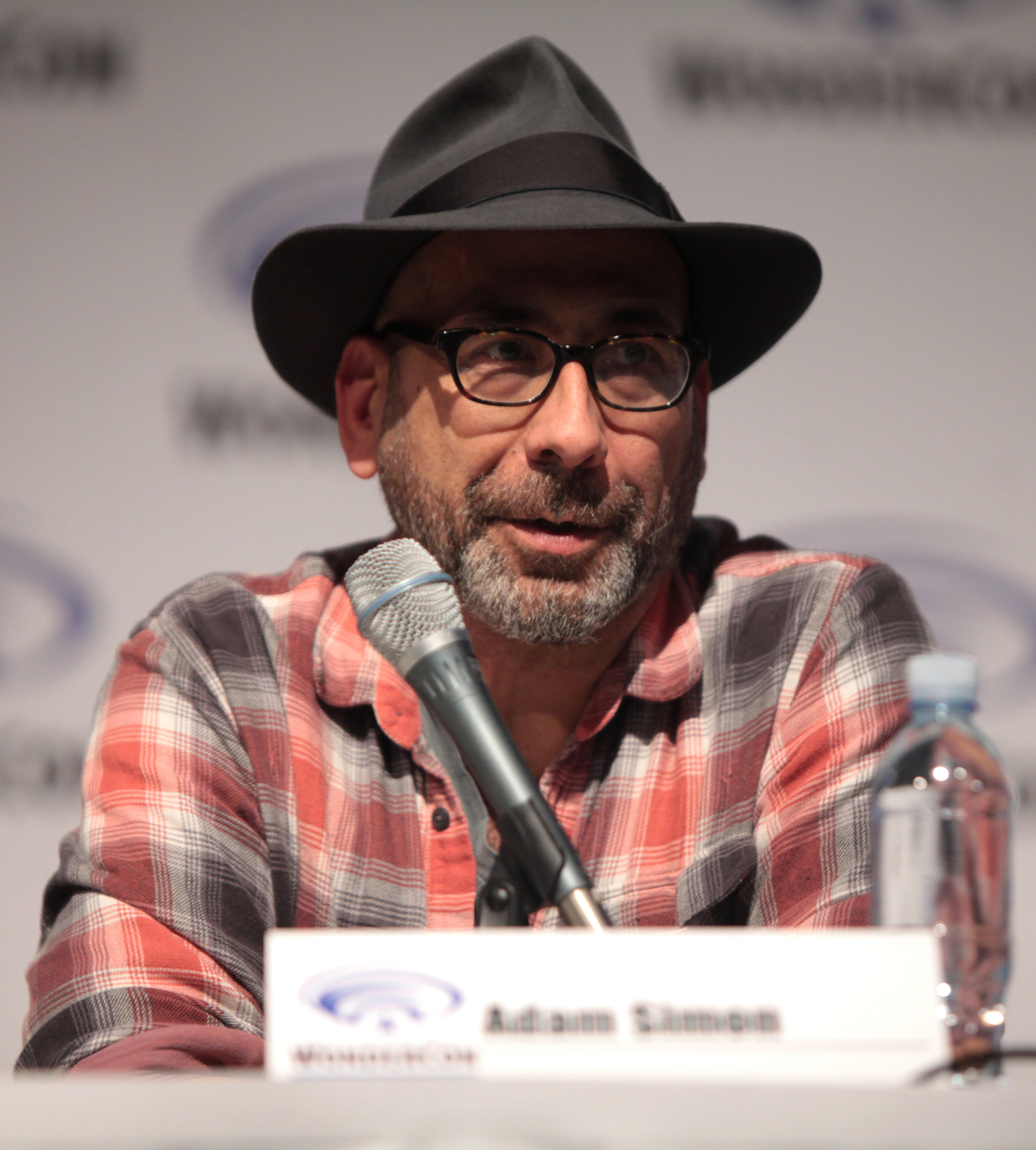
- Adam Simon at the 2015 WonderCon promoting Salem
- Born: February 6, 1962 (age 64); Chicago, Illinois, U.S.
- Occupation: Director • screenwriter • producer
- Years active: 1989–present

Adam Simon (born February 6, 1962) is an American director, producer, and screenwriter. His directing credits include Brain Dead (1990), Body Chemistry II: The Voice of a Stranger (1992), and Carnosaur (1993). Simon, along with producer Brannon Braga, co-created the television series Salem. As a screenwriter, Simon is known for Bones (2001), The Haunting in Connecticut (2009), and Books of Blood (2020).

== Career ==
Simon played a humorous version of himself, pitching a project and getting barred from the studio lot in the opening scene of Robert Altman's The Player (1992). He previously appeared, thinly veiled, as a fictional character in Christopher Guest's film The Big Picture (1989) and would reappear in Kim Newman's novel Johnny Alucard (2013), where he again pitches a project and becomes the only person in Hollywood standing up to a particularly sinister studio executive.

Kim Newman has noted that Adam Simon has "become one of the most oft-cited figures in contemporary Hollywood satire, and those in the know have begun to play the game of Simon-spotting. [...] Remarkable look- and act-alikes for Adam Simon have appeared in a couple of sinister Hollywood satires: Adam Rafkin (Jarrad Paul) on the cancelled-too-soon TV series Action, who ruins his emotional and physical health on successive drafts of Beverly Hills Gun Club for sleazy überproducer Peter Dragon (Jay Mohr); and Adam Kesher (Justin Theroux) in David Lynch's Mulholland Drive, who finds his entire life - and film project - jeopardised when he considers going against the wishes of backers who represent either organised crime or Hell."

== Filmography ==
=== Film ===
Title	Year	Credited as			Notes
Title	Year	Director	Producer	Writer	Notes
Lock Up	1989	No	Co-	No	
Brain Dead	1990	Yes	No	Yes	
Body Chemistry II: The Voice of a Stranger	1992	Yes	No	No	
Carnosaur	1993	Yes	No	Yes	
The Typewriter, the Rifle & the Movie Camera	1996	Yes	No	Yes	Documentary film
The American Nightmare	2000	Yes	No	Yes	Documentary film
John Landis on: An American Werewolf in London	2001	Yes	No	No	Featurette
Bones	2001	No	No	Yes	
The Spectre of Hope	2002	No	Yes	No	Documentary film
The Haunting in Connecticut	2009	No	No	Yes	
Captive State	2019	No	Executive	No	
Books of Blood	2020	No	Executive	Yes	

=== Television ===
Title	Year	Credited as				Notes
Title	Year	Creator	Director	Writer	Executive producer	Notes
Directors on Directors	1997	No	Yes (1)	No	No	Docuseries, Episode "Simon - Corman"
BlackBoxTV	2012	No	No	Yes (1)	No	Anthology series
Salem	2014–17	Yes	No	Yes (21)	Yes	
Next	2020	No	No	Yes (3)	Co-executive	Co-executive producer (9 episodes)

=== Actor ===
Title	Year	Role	Notes
The Unborn	1991	Priest	
Bob Roberts	1992	Cutting edge head writer	
The Player	1992	Adam Simon	
Directors on Directors	1997	Himself	Docuseries, Episode "Simon - Corman"
Digging Up Bones	2002	Himself	Featurette documentary
Urban Gothic: Bones and Its Influences	2002	Himself	Featurette documentary
The Brains Behind the Nightmare	2020	Himself	Featurette documentary
Tales from the Cranium	2020	Himself	Featurette documentary
