= Janet Montgomery =

British actress (born 1985)

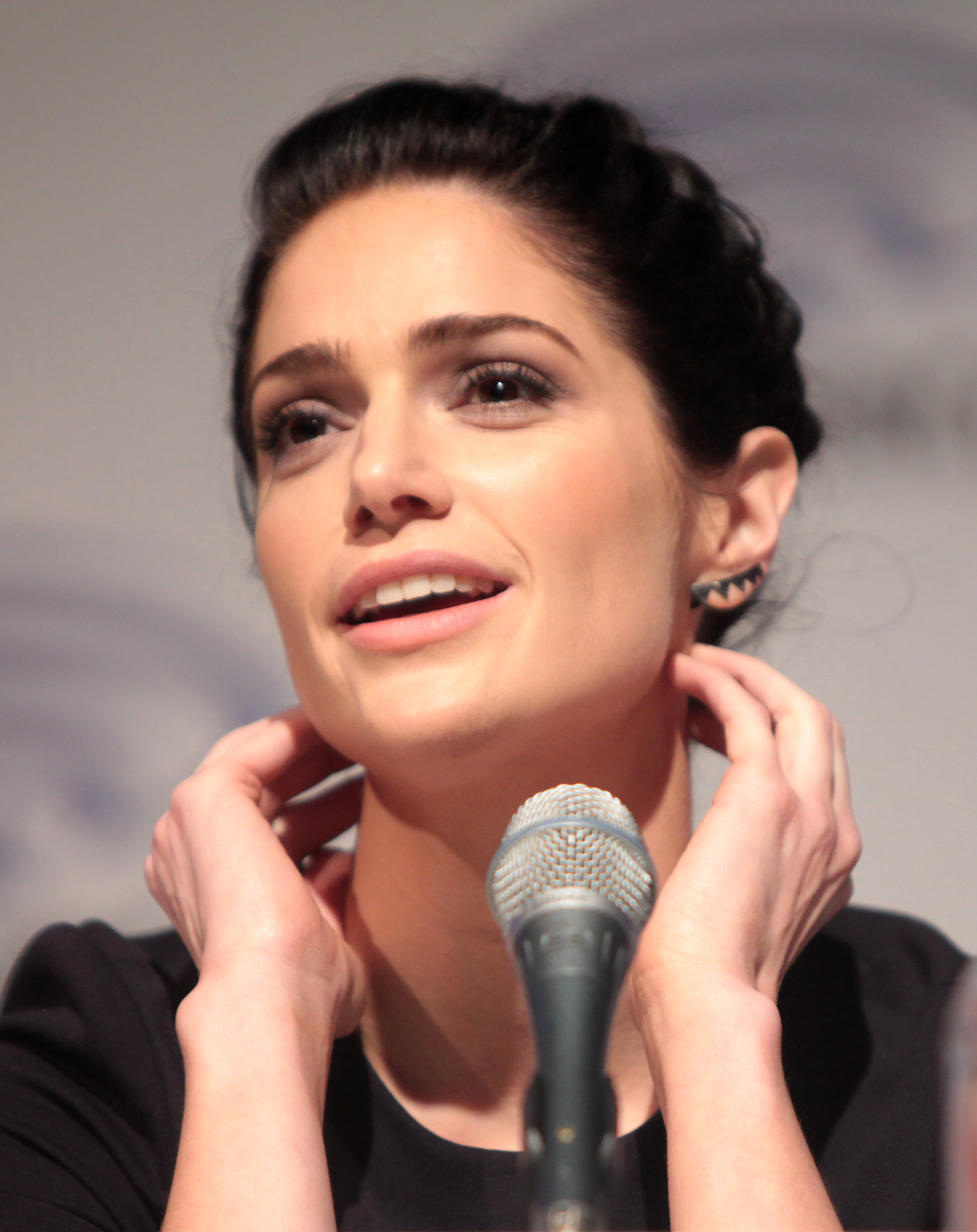
- Montgomery at the 2015 WonderCon
- Born: Janet Ruth Montgomery; October 29, 1985 (age 40); Bournemouth, Dorset, United Kingdom
- Occupation: Actress
- Years active: 2008–present
- Spouse: Joe Fox (m. 2019; sep. 2025)
- Children: 2

Janet Ruth Montgomery (born October 29, 1985) is an English film and TV actress. She first gained attention for her role as Ames in the second season of the television series Human Target (2010–11), and also for her appearance in the 2009 straight-to-DVD film The Hills Run Red. She played the lead character in the television drama Made in Jersey (2012), cancelled after two episodes aired. From 2014 to 2017, she starred as the lead character, Mary Sibley, in the series Salem. From 2018 to 2023, Montgomery played the role of Lauren Bloom on the medical drama television series New Amsterdam.

== Career ==
Although trained as a dancer at the Stella Mann College of Performing Arts, Bedford, Montgomery chose to pursue acting rather than dance professionally. Her lack of drama school training made it difficult for her to obtain acting representation initially. She achieved her breakthrough after producing a play with her friend Gethin Anthony.

In 2008, Montgomery was cast as the love interest of the character Tony Stonem in an episode of the teenage drama Skins. She also appeared in both the TV movie Dis/Connected and the short film Flushed.

The following year, Montgomery appeared in two straight-to-DVD horror-genre releases filmed in Sofia, Bulgaria – The Hills Run Red and the finale of the original Wrong Turn trilogy, Wrong Turn 3: Left for Dead and played the role of Fallyn Werner, a teenage killer in the Lifetime film Accused at 17.

In 2010, Montgomery appeared in her first theatrically released film, playing Giselle in the independent horror film Dead Cert and the supporting role of Madeline in the Academy Award-nominated psychological thriller Black Swan – playing a Little Swan to Natalie Portman's Oscar-winning portrayal of the Black Swan.

That same year Montgomery also signed on to play Paul Rudd's love interest in Our Idiot Brother. After seeing her audition tape in Los Angeles, producers worked around her schedule on Entourage and flew her to New York to begin shooting. While working on Entourage, Montgomery was invited to appear on The League, a critically acclaimed semi-improvised show about American football, and played Ambrosia the stripper in the first episode of the second season.

In December 2011, Montgomery starred as Princess Mithian, a love interest of King Arthur, in Series 4 Episode 11 of Merlin, later returning in Series 5 Episode 4 (alongside James Fox).

In 2012, Montgomery played the lead role in the CBS television series Made in Jersey. The series was cancelled after two episodes aired. Two additional episodes aired on 22 December 2012.

Montgomery attracted the attention of Stephen Poliakoff via an audition tape she sent to casting director Andy Pryor for the role of Sarah in Dancing on the Edge. The five-part miniseries aired 4 February 2013 on BBC Two.

She also played opposite David Tennant in BBC Four's Spies of Warsaw. She played Grace Van Helsing, "the prodigal daughter who returns to run the family newspaper (and presumably stake a few vampires)" in the unsold ABC pilot Gothica. Actor Chris Egan played her love interest, the character Dorian Gray.

From 2014 to 2017, Montgomery played the lead role of powerful witch Mary Sibley on the WGN America gothic horror series Salem. In October 2016, Montgomery started in a recurring role on the NBC drama This Is Us. Also in 2016, Montgomery was cast in the lead female role in the comedy film Amateur Night alongside Jason Biggs.

In February 2018, Montgomery was cast in a main role in the NBC medical drama New Amsterdam, as Lauren Bloom, the head ER physician. In October 2019, she played the role of Marguerite in the American drama thriller film Nighthawks.

== Personal life ==
Montgomery was born in Bournemouth, England. Her uncle was bass player Mike "Monty" Montgomery of Zoot Money's Big Roll Band. She has a younger brother, Jason, who is also an actor. In November 2018, Montgomery said that she was expecting her first child with boyfriend Joe Fox, a daughter, who was born in 2019. The couple married in Jamaica on 29 November 2019. In June 2025, Montgomery announced that she is pregnant with their second child. In December 2025, Montgomery confirmed that she and her husband welcomed their second child, a son. In June 2026, Montgomery confirmed in a post to Instagram that she became a single mother of two, 10 days after the birth of her son.

== Filmography ==
=== Film ===
Year	Title	Role	Notes
2008	Flushed	Queen Bitch	Short film
2009	The Hills Run Red	Serina	
2009	Wrong Turn 3: Left for Dead	Alexandra "Alex" Miles	
2010	Dead Cert	Giselle	
2010	Black Swan	Madeline	
2011	Our Idiot Brother	Lady Arabella	
2013	The Republic of Two	Caroline	
2014	10 Things I Hate About Life		Unfinished and unreleased
2016	Happily Ever After	Heather	
2016	Amateur Night	Nikki	
2017	The Space Between Us	Sarah Elliot	
2017	Romans	Emma	
2018	In a Relationship	Lindsay	
2019	Nighthawks	Marguerite	
2020	Think Like a Dog	Bridget	
TBA	Fate †	Young Tilly	Post-production

=== Television ===
Year	Title	Role	Notes
2008	Dis/Connected	Lucy	Television film
2008	Skins	Beth	Episode: "Tony"
2010	Accused at 17	Fallyn Werner	Television film
2010	The League	Ambrosia	Episode: "Vegas Draft"
2010–2011	Entourage	Jennie	Recurring role (seasons 7–8)
2010–2011	Human Target	Ames	Main role (season 2)
2011–2012	Merlin	Princess Mithian	2 episodes
2012	Made in Jersey	Martina Garretti	Main role
2013	Dancing on the Edge	Sarah	Recurring role
2013	Spies of Warsaw	Anna	Main role
2013	Gothica	Grace Van Helsing	Unsold television pilot
2013	Downton Abbey	Freda Dudley Ward	Episode: "The London Season"
2014	Black Mirror	Bethany Grey	Episode: "White Christmas"
2014–2017	Salem	Mary Sibley	Main role
2016–2017	This Is Us	Olivia Maine	Recurring role (season 1)
2018	The Romanoffs	Michelle Westbrooke	Episode: "The Royal We"
2018–2023	New Amsterdam	Dr. Lauren Bloom	Main role
2022	The Ex-Wife	Jen	Main role
2023	Quantum Leap	Rebecca Egan	Episode: "Ben & Teller"
2025	1923	Hillary	Recurring role (season 2)
2026	Scarpetta	Janet	Recurring role

== Awards and nominations ==
Year	Association	Category	Nominated work	Result
2015	Fangoria Chainsaw Awards	Favorite Actress on Television	Salem	Nominated
2016	Fangoria Chainsaw Awards	Favorite Actress on Television	Salem	Nominated
