= Chris Cramer =

British news journalist and executive (1948–2021)

- Born: Christopher Ranville Cramer; 3 January 1948; Portsmouth, England
- Died: 16 January 2021 (aged 73)
- Occupations: News journalist, executive
- Known for: Field journalist safety
- Spouse: Nina Cramer
- Children: 3

Christopher Ranville Cramer (3 January 1948 – 16 January 2021) was a British news journalist and executive. During his career, he was head of news gathering for the BBC, an executive at CNN International, and a consultant for The Wall Street Journal. Cramer was perhaps best known in his field for raising training standards for journalists who are given dangerous assignments, as well as suggesting safety equipment while away and necessary counselling upon their return. Such methods arose from his being taken hostage in the Iranian Embassy siege in London in 1980.

== Early years ==
Cramer was born and raised in Portsmouth, England. As a teenager he became a reporter for The Portsmouth Evening News. In 1970, he moved to BBC Radio Solent and then worked in BBC television news as an editor and field producer.

== Iranian Embassy siege ==
In 1980, as part of Cramer's BBC work, he went to the Iranian embassy in London to obtain a travel visa. He was trapped, along with 25 other hostages, when Iranian Arabs, campaigning for sovereignty of Khuzestan province, seized control of the building. He told his captors that he felt extremely unwell, and, according to Cramer, "they were convinced that I was having a heart attack or something worse than that". He was released and gave information on the situation to the Special Air Service team preparing to storm the embassy. Five terrorists and two hostages were killed over the six-day event; Cramer was released on the second day. He declined psychiatric counselling, but later believed he had suffered post-traumatic stress disorder (PTSD) and called it "the single most terrifying thing of [his] entire life".

Cramer was portrayed by Nicholas Boulton in the 2017 film about the siege, 6 Days.

== Later career ==
Cramer was responsible for giving future Middle East editor Jeremy Bowen his first job at the BBC in 1988. The major news stories Cramer was responsible for overseeing included Michael Buerk's reporting of the Ethiopian famine, Kate Adie's coverage of the Tiananmen Square massacre, and the Revolutions of 1989. Cramer became head of news gathering at the BBC in the mid-1990s and sat on the BBC's News and Current Affairs Management Board. With BBC safety managers, he introduced the first hostile environment training courses, risk assessments and equipment for those covering conflicts. He later introduced the first confidential counselling service for news teams, recognising PTSD, and helped found the International News Safety Institute (INSI), which spearheaded safety across the news industry. Cramer felt journalism had become increasingly dangerous. In an interview with NPR in 2009, he said "We're being targeted, we're being imprisoned, we're being harassed, we're being assaulted, and sometimes, and all too frequently, we're being murdered". He was honorary president of the INSI from 2003 until 2012.

In 1996, Cramer joined CNN, where he oversaw global news operations as head of CNN International for 11 years. His focus on journalist safety was widely adopted by other news organizations. He was responsible for establishing the position of Senior Editor of Middle East Affairs at CNN, after the September 11 attacks in 2001. After CNN, he took on senior roles at the Thomson Reuters news service and headed a video production team at The Wall Street Journal.

== Death ==
Cramer died of cancer on 16 January 2021 at age 73. He is survived by his wife, their two children, and a daughter from a previous marriage.

== See also ==
- List of kidnappings
- List of solved missing person cases (post-2000)
