= Badavi =

Badavi is both a given name and a surname. Notable people with the name include:

- Badavi Guseynov (born 1991), Azerbaijani footballer
- Ali Badavi (born 1982), Iranian footballer
- Fowzi Badavi Nejad, Iranian terrorist
- Abdullah Ahmad Badawi, Malaysian politician
- Abdel Hamid Badawi, Egyptian legislator
- Badavi Magomedov, Russian wrestler
