= Arnfield (surname) =

Arnfield is the English toponymic surname. Notable people with the surname include:

- Jack Arnfield, British boxer
- Er Arnfield, English football manager
- Marjorie Arnfield, English artist

== Other ==
- Arnfield Reservoir
