= Max Vernon (police officer) =

British constable (1936–2021)

- Born: Maxwell Stamp Vernon; 7 January 1936
- Died: 13 February 2021 (aged 85)
- Police career
- Department: Metropolitan Police (1956–1996)
- Rank: Chief Superintendent

Chief Superintendent Maxwell Stamp Vernon (7 January 1936 – 13 February 2021) was a British police officer and hostage negotiator. Vernon joined the Metropolitan Police after serving as a military policeman during his National Service. He was involved in the successful negotiations to end the 1975 Balcombe Street siege and afterwards served with the Metropolitan Police's fraud squad. In 1980, as a chief inspector, Vernon led the six-man negotiating team during the Iranian Embassy siege. He thought he was close to resolving the siege peacefully when a hostage, who Vernon thought was intentionally provoking his captors, was shot dead. This led to a Special Air Service (SAS) assault on the building which killed or captured the gunmen and freed all bar one of the hostages (who was shot and killed during the assault). Vernon continued to negotiate until the last moment as a distraction technique and was later commended for this by a member of the SAS team.

Vernon returned to his fraud squad role after the assault, but suffered from depression for many months, feeling that he had failed in his negotiations. He ran the Metropolitan Police's negotiation training course from 1983 to 1986 and incorporated lessons learnt during the siege into his teaching. Vernon later served as divisional commander at Woolwich and retired in the rank of chief superintendent. In 2017 he was portrayed by actor Mark Strong in 6 Days, a film dramatization of the siege. Vernon died of pneumonia in 2021 following a COVID-19 infection.

== Early life and career ==
Vernon was born on 7 January 1936, the eldest of five children of a junior school headmaster. He grew up in Westcliff-on-Sea, Essex. Vernon carried out his compulsory National Service as a military policeman at the Supreme Headquarters Allied Powers Europe, in Mons, Belgium. Upon leaving the military he joined the Metropolitan Police as a cadet. Vernon was married to Betty with whom he had three daughters. His wife died when the children were still young and Vernon afterwards remarried, to Lucy. In his spare time he was a clay pigeon shooter and model railway enthusiast. Vernon was also an amateur historian with a particular interest in the Battle of Waterloo.

In 1975 Vernon helped negotiate the end of the Balcombe Street siege in which four IRA gunmen held a couple hostage in a flat in Marylebone; the hostages were released and the IRA men arrested. Vernon was afterwards selected to receive hostage negotiation training, at a time when it was not a widely recognised skill.

== Iranian embassy siege ==
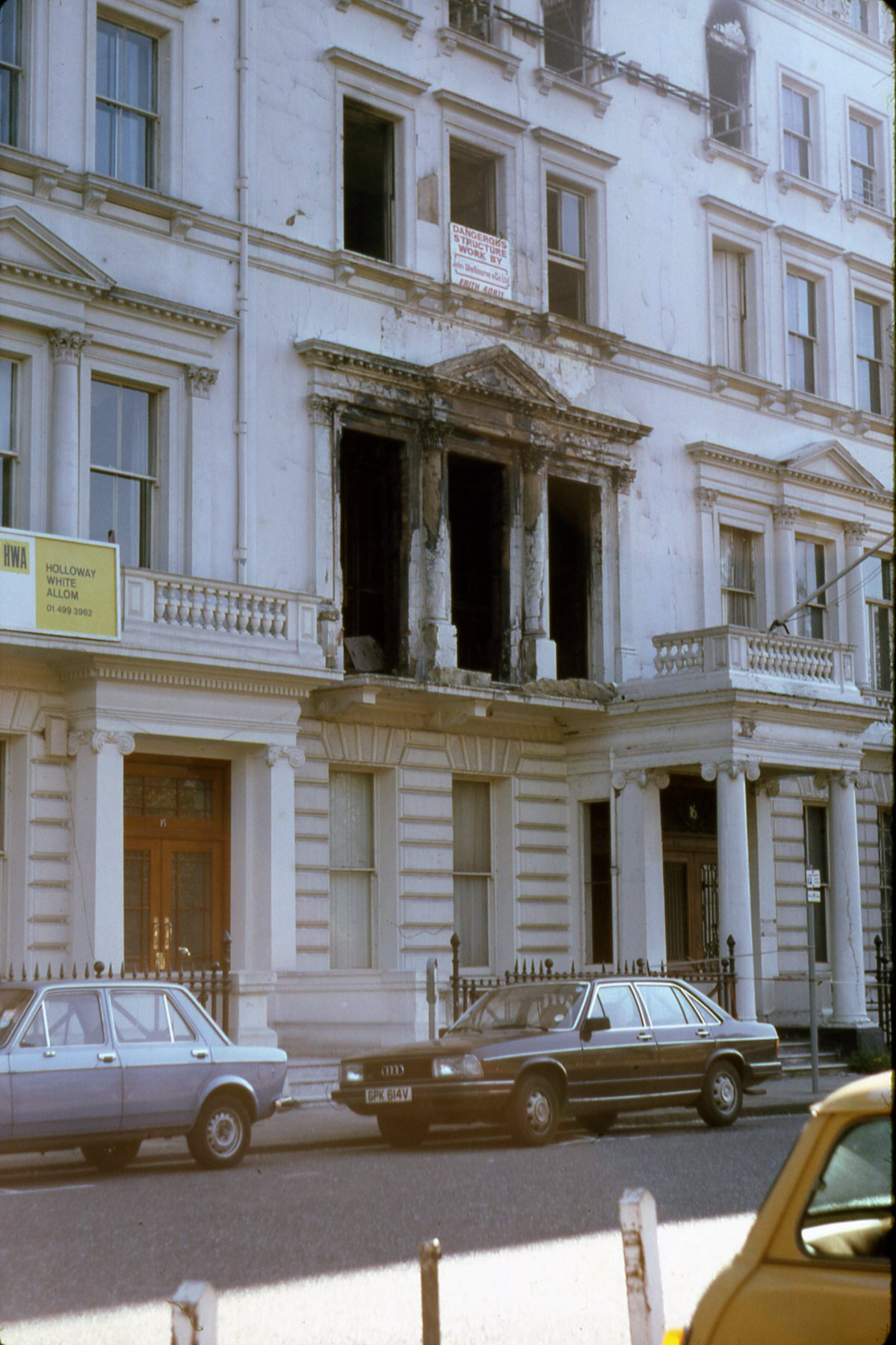
The Iranian embassy in the aftermath of the siege

By 1980 Vernon was a chief inspector with the Metropolitan Police fraud squad. Because he had attended the negotiation course, Vernon was summoned to the scene of the Iranian Embassy siege on its first day, 30 April. He was not aware of the nature of the incident until he arrived on the scene. Vernon led a team of six negotiators that worked around the clock from a room in a building near the embassy. After external communications were cut off the negotiators spoke with the hostage takers by means of a field telephone passed through a window of the embassy. The gunmen initially held 26 hostages.

Only one of the hostage takers, Oan Ali Mohammed (known as Salim), could speak English so most of the negotiations were carried out through him. Vernon described Salim as "educated and very polite". Vernon's principal objective was to secure a peaceful end to the siege and the release of the hostages, but a secondary aim was to prolong the siege to allow time for the British Army's Special Air Service (SAS) to prepare for an assault on the building, in case the situation turned violent. Vernon later recalled "our job was to get the gunmen to walk out without anyone dying or giving in to their demands. We had to buy time for both sides. It was rotten. We would be pushed by the gunmen to get them their demands and we were pushed by our bosses to talk them out without giving up anything".

One of Vernon's tactics was to agree to some of the hostage takers' minor demands, where doing so would not affect the police operation. Vernon agreed to Salim's demand that the police use an Iranian interpreter to allow them to talk to the other hostage takers. However the police discovered that the interpreter was mistranslating and adding phrases that the police had not spoken, including telling the hostage takers that they were all going to die. Within two days the interpreter was removed from the scene. Additionally, Vernon agreed to supply the hostage takers with cigarettes, delivering them in person despite knowing the risk that he could be seized or shot.

Vernon described the negotiations as a "psychological fencing match". He was described as being calm and authoritative despite the pressure of the situation. The gunmen sometimes made their hostages speak to the police over the telephone which Vernon found hindered his negotiations. He found he had to lie to the hostages about the situation and feared that the hostage takers would discover this, dashing his credibility. Vernon's tactic was to attempt to get the hostages off the line as soon as possible. After the siege Vernon stated "if it's going to save somebody I will lie; the trick is not to be caught". As the siege continued Vernon negotiated the release of a number of hostages.

Vernon later stated that he did not attempt to build any kind of rapport with the hostage takers, but merely aimed to keep the lines of communication open for as long as possible. He found that the longer the siege continued the more advantages he held, noting of the hostage takers that "they don't talk to anybody else, they become quite reliant on you". By the sixth day, 5 May, Vernon, who later stated "my biggest weapon has always been to be in a position where I can usually talk most people into something or most people out of something", felt he was close to persuading the gunmen to surrender. However that day one of the hostages, the embassy's chief press officer, Abbas Lavasani, was shot by the gunmen. Vernon thought that Lavasani was determined to become a martyr and had intentionally provoked the hostage takers by insulting them verbally and through writing on the embassy's walls. The killing set in motion the SAS assault on the embassy.

Vernon continued to talk to Salim in an attempt to distract the hostage takers from the preparations being made for the assault. Vernon noted that "I knew he was going to be killed even as I talked to him" but also "that [it] didn't bother me at all. It might sound cold, but they'd killed somebody and terrorised 26 people". Vernon's tactics changed, now promising that all of the gunmen's demands would be met including safe passage to an airport.

The assault started at 7.23 pm on 5 May. Vernon heard, over the telephone, the sound of a window being broken and someone saying "something's going on". He continued to distract Salim, asking him who he would like to drive their transport to the airport. Vernon heard the remainder of the 11-minute raid over the telephone. Five of the six gunmen were killed (one was arrested) and 19 of the 20 remaining hostages were rescued (one was killed in the cross fire).

Vernon said he felt no joy at the end of the siege and sat in the corner of his negotiation room and cried, afterwards stating "I had no idea why. I wasn't feeling sorry for anybody. I wasn't worried about the SAS. I just couldn't stop crying" and "I felt I had failed. People had died. We were meant to talk them out without any shooting. I was in abject misery". He later said of the crying episode that "I was very ashamed of it I tried to keep it quiet". Vernon received no formal post-event support or counselling. He drove home in his Citroen DS after the siege, but noted that he could recall none of the journey and that he thought he was in no fit state to drive a vehicle.

== Later life ==
Vernon returned to work at the fraud squad the day after the end of the siege. He suffered from depression for months afterwards, having felt that he had failed to end the siege peacefully. However, he later came to terms with the event and thought that he had helped reduce casualties in the assault by buying six days for the SAS to prepare. Rusty Firman, one of the SAS operatives in the raid, said: "he kept them talking and bought us time. He deserves more credit than he got. Without that extra time the outcome could have been very different"

Vernon ran the Metropolitan Police's negotiation course from 1983 to 1986. He used his experience of the siege in his teaching, noting that "there has been nothing like it before or since. We learned while we were working on it and people are still learning from what we did, right and wrong". Vernon rose to the rank of chief superintendent and retired from the police as divisional commander of Woolwich. He was portrayed by Mark Strong in 6 Days, the 2017 film based on the siege. During filming, Vernon met Strong and told him "you've been wrongly cast. You're two inches shorter than me and I have more hair". Vernon died of pneumonia on 13 February 2021, following a COVID-19 infection.
