= The Regiment (video game) =

2006 video game

- Official PC DVD game cover in Europe
- Developer: Kuju London
- Publishers: Konami (EU); Encore Inc (NA)
- Platform: Microsoft Windows
- Release: February 17, 2006
- Genre: First-person shooter

The Regiment (sometimes known as The Regiment: Close-Quarters Counter-Terrorism) is a computer game developed by Kuju London and released by Konami on February 17, 2006. It is based on the Special Air Service, and includes some real-life missions such as the Iranian Embassy siege.

It was released in North America in 2007 as Terror Strike: Close Quarters Combat by Encore Inc.

== Gameplay ==
The Regiment has two modes; consisting of Arcade and Simulation Mode. The difference is the former relies of crosshairs, ammo counters, a sprint meter with health for your AI teammates. Simulation Mode has a number of magazines the player has, health and a timer. It also forces the player to rely on the gun's sights to aim.

It uses a modified Unreal Tournament engine with Karma physics.

=== Single Player ===
For Single Player mode, players can either choose to do training missions to get familiar with the game or choose to play the campaign.

The AI used for the teammates can be ordered to either assault a place or wait until a flashbang is used.

=== Multiplayer ===
Multiplayer Mode consist of Co-op and Sabre Squad. Co-op allows up to four players for online multiplayer mode. They play through the levels from the campaign.

For Sabre Squad, players can choose to play either a SAS operator or a terrorist. Players need to earn Dagger points, but they're awarded to players who kill terrorists. After each round is done, any SAS operators killed will switch over to the terrorists and vice versa.

== Development ==
The Regiment was announced to be in development on August 20, 2004. The game was developed at the time with Unreal Technology.

Plans to release the game on the PlayStation 2 did not push through and was subsequently announced as cancelled. It would have also allowed players to interact online through headset.

Kuju collaborated with actual SAS veterans, including Rhett Butler and John McAleese, in creating the game. The latter acted as the technical advisor to ensure any portrayals of the SAS are done accurately and as the in-game person who briefs players prior to a mission.

== Reception ==
The Regiment received mixed reviews from critics upon release. GameSpot gave the game 5 out of 10, citing the difficulties and AI implemented to control your teammates. Eurogamer also gave it a 5 out of 10 and mentioned "AI issues, laggy multiplayer and frustrating mission design." GameZone gave the game a rating of 5.0 out of 10, criticizing it for having "tedious and boring gameplay."
