= Ariel Bruce =

British independent social worker

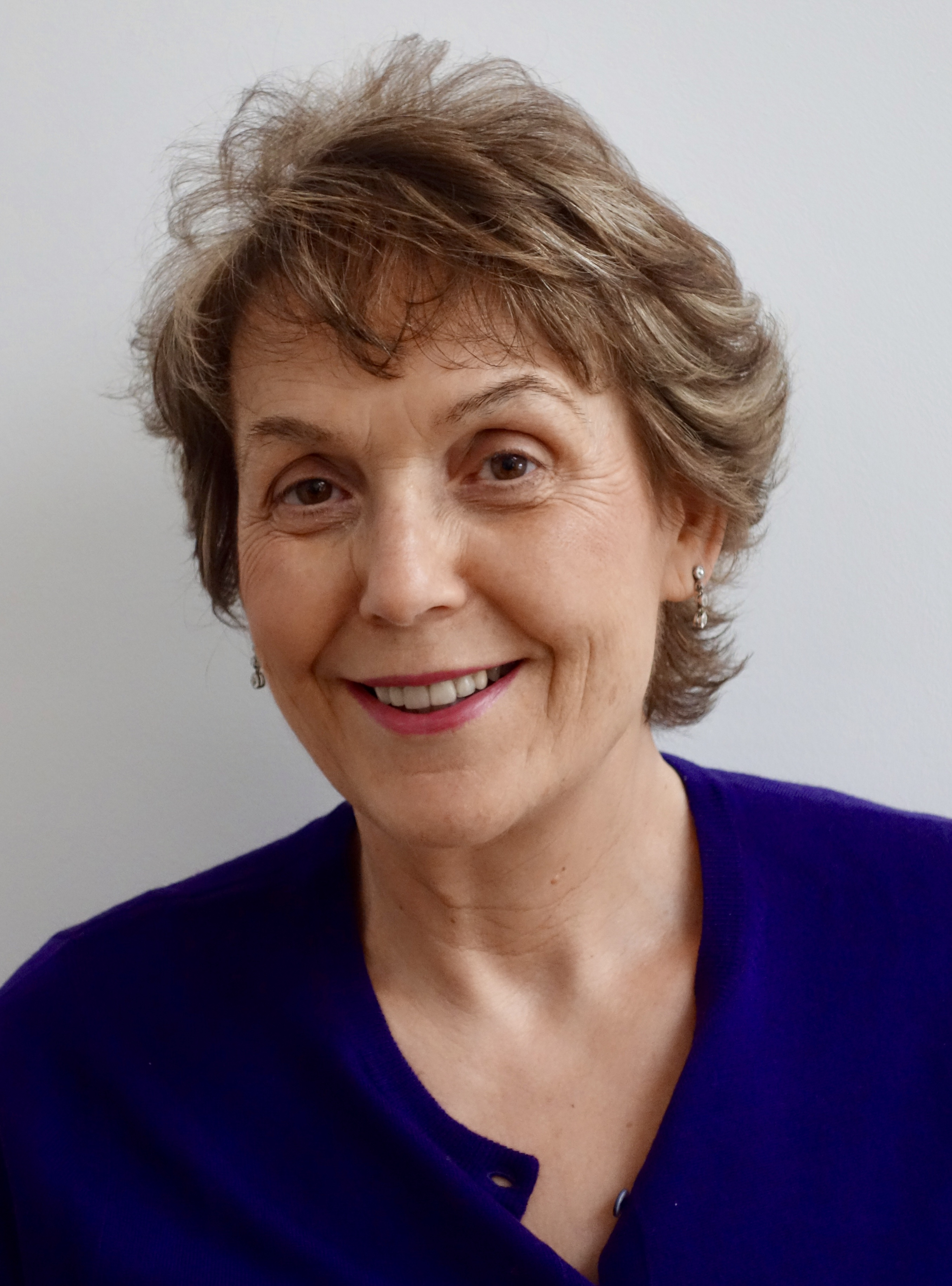
Ariel Bruce

Ariel Bruce is a British independent social worker who works as a specialist search consultant for film, TV and documentary makers. Born in Hampstead, London, she is the granddaughter of Marxist economist Fritz Sternberg.

== Long Lost Family ==
From 2011 until 2024 she worked as the lead search and social work consultant on the ITV documentary series, Long Lost Family. As the head consultant, Bruce undertook the research into tracing missing family members for the series. The Telegraph has described Bruce as "the Agatha Christie of the adoption world".

Long Lost Family: Born Without Trace is presented by Davina McCall and Nicky Campbell, and was announced as the winner of the Features category at the 2021 BAFTA awards (British Academy of Film and Television Arts) and the winner of the Best Factual Series category at the 2021 Rose d’Or awards.

Long Lost Family was recently announced as the winner of the 2021 TV Choice Award for Best Lifestyle category. The documentary series previously won the BAFTA (British Academy of Film and Television Arts) for Best Feature in 2014, as well as the prestigious Royal Television Society [RTS] Programme Awards for the Popular Factual and Features category in 2012.

Alongside Long Lost Family, Bruce has worked on a number of other British TV series, including Who Do You Think You Are and The Gift. In the early 1990s she worked on the Channel 4 TV series Cutting Edge, providing research for the episode entitled "Relative Strangers". In 2009 Bruce returned to Cutting Edge to work on an episode called "The Homecoming" which told the story of a former child care home residents attempts to trace their birth family.

From 2024 onwards Ariel will work as a Consultant to the Social Work team.

== Media work ==
Documentary film credits include 2014's A Tale Of Two Thieves, written by Erin Donovan about the Great Train Robbery's mysterious 'Ulsterman'. Bruce was employed by the film makers to trace Patrick Mckenna (The Ulsterman). Another credit includes Juvenile Liaison 2 by Nick Broomfield. She has also worked as a search consultant on Hanratty: The Mystery of Dead Man's Hill, produced by Bob Woffinden as part of the True Stories series.

Bruce acted as consultant social worker to Caradoc King of United Artists. Caradoc wrote his book, The Problem Child, about his life experiences. Katherine Norbury also instructed the services of Bruce when tracking down her birth parents. She wrote her book,The Fish Ladder, published in 2015 by Bloomsburyabout her experience. British Journalist Kate Adie CBE also instructed Bruce's help in tracing both her birth mother's and birth father's families. Bruce is acknowledged in Adie's books, Nobody’s Child and her memoir The Kindness of Strangers.

In 2018 Genevieve Fox's Memoir "Milkshakes and Morphine" credits Ariel Bruce as the 'super sleuth' who assisted her in a family search. Fox is a former features editor at The Daily Telegraph, The Independent and Daily Mail.

In 2021, Bruce appeared on the podcast Changes with Annie Mac for International Women's Day.

in 2023, Bruce was interviewed on Generation Shame, a personal and political podcast by Jon Holmes.

In 2025, Bruce was interviewed as part of Laura Ancell's prodcast, DNA Trail: The Promise; 'a gripping true-life story of a young woman’s deathbed promise to her father that takes her on a remarkable journey to solve a family mystery.'

== Social work ==
Alongside television work Bruce and her team, trained social workers specialising in post adoption services, carry out private searches for missing family members. One such private client was the British actress Stephanie Cole, whom Ariel helped to reunite with her half sister. Cole went on to name and thank Bruce in her autobiography and in interviews after the search.

== Charity work ==
Ariel Bruce is a trustee for the Overseas Plastic Surgery Appeal (OPSA). Bruce has visited Pakistan to assist the OPSA surgical team with social work care for the parents of children with often severe facial abnormalities.
