= Local Authority Investigation Officers Group =

British fraud prevention organisation

Local Authority Investigation Officers Group (LAIOG) was a British organisation involving Local Authority investigators. It ceased to operate on 1 December 2016.

LAIOG was recognised as a representative group in providing information and statistics to, for example, the UK parliament. The organisation was considered of sufficient importance to be mentioned by name in the fraud prevention policies of many Local Authorities and Department for Work and Pensions newsletters.

Although referred to under Fraud Squad in this encyclopaedia as an investigation unit, this was not strictly the case, although members did liaise during investigations.

== Composition ==
There were a number of regional groups within the national 'umbrella' organisation. The official regional groups, that is those represented on the executive committee were :

- Northern
- Midlands
- Wales (Welsh Benefits Investigation Group) WBIG
- Eastern
- LBFIG (London Boroughs' Fraud Investigators' Group)
- Southern
- South-Western

Other groups also met, such as Northern Home Counties.

== Membership ==
At its peak, around 400 Local Authorities across England, Scotland and Wales were members of LAIOG. Membership was for the authority, rather than individual members.

== Administration ==
The organisation was run by a committee of elected and representative members, made up of :

- Chair
- Vice Chair
- Secretary
- Treasurer
- 6 Executive Officers
- Website Officer
- Representatives from the following regions :
  - Eastern
  - LBFIG (London)
  - Midlands
  - Northern
  - South West
  - Southern
  - Wales

== Activities ==
LAIOG's main functions and activities were:

- provision of access to information relevant to the field of investigations;
- a communication network, via the website;
- dissemination of information to members;
- local and national representation on policy, training and various legislative issues; and
- a national conference, combined with an AGM.

LAIOG was also involved in setting up a number of qualifications for investigators, working with ITS Training (UK) Ltd. and Bond Solon.

The regional groups also held AGMs and some offered training days for members.

== Other Organisations ==
LAIOG became part of TEICCAF on 1 December 2016. TEICCAF has now ceased to operate and its website redirects to the IRRV Investigation Faculty.

The National Investigation Officers' Group (NIOG) was set up on 2019 and includes on its steering committee a number of people who were involved in LAIOG before it ceased to operate.
