= Overseas Plastic Surgery Appeal =

Charity in UK

- Founded: 1998
- Type: Non-governmental organization
- Purpose: Plastic Surgery
- Location: London, United Kingdom
- Region served: Pakistan
- Key people: Nick Hart, founder

The Overseas Plastic Surgery Appeal (abbreviated to OPSA) is a registered charity in the UK, that exists to provide free facial surgery for poor children and young adults in Pakistan. The OPSA team operate on facial abnormalities including cleft lip and palate.

== Foundation ==
OPSA was founded in 1998 by Nick Hart who, after travelling to Pakistan with a surgical team to carry out facial operations on young children, returned to Hull in Northern England to set up OPSA.

Starting out in a small local hospital in Gujrat, a purpose built hospital, called The Cleft Hospital, was soon built to meet the growing demand. OPSA have worked out of The Cleft Hospital ever since.

== Activities ==
The OPSA team travel from the UK, Ireland and Turkey twice a year to operate and teach at The Cleft hospital in Gujrat. The yearly trips to Pakistan were increased to twice annually in 2008.

Working with medical teams in Gujrat, including Dr Ijaz Bashir, OPSA teach and train local doctors to carry out some of the work year round. Patients travel from all over Pakistan in the hope of receiving advice and treatment from the specialist UK surgical team.

== Facts and figures ==
Cleft palate occurs in around 1 to 2 of every 1000 births around the world. In Pakistan, up to 10,000 babies are born each year with cleft conditions, with the majority not being able to afford to pay for operations.

As of the end of 2017, the OPSA team have operated on more than 3000 patients. Approximately 100 to 150 patients receive surgery at each OPSA camp, which last for 7 days.

== Medical team ==
Nick Hart is a British doctor and plastic surgeon and the founder of OPSA. Hart was the dedicated cleft lip and palate surgeon for the Hull & East Yorkshire region until 2000, when the service was moved to Leeds. Hart led all of the surgical teams to Pakistan for OPSA, but in 2015 retired from surgery, staying on as the charity's chairman.

Penelope McManus is a consultant oncoplastic breast surgeon based at the East Riding Hospital in East Yorkshire. McManus joined OPSA surgical team in 2013 to aid with the diagnosis and care of breast cancer patients. Pakistan has a high rate of breast cancer and few specialist services to care for patients. Bashir installed a mammography machine at The Cleft Hospital so that McManus can treat patients as well as train local doctors and nurses.

Annette Middleton is a Yorkshire-based theatre nurse who first travelled to Pakistan with OPSA in 1999. Middleton still annually attends the camps in Gujarat, Pakistan, to aid with teaching and operations.

Chris Hill is a consultant plastic and reconstructive surgeon based in Northern Ireland who has been volunteering for OPSA since early 2015. He is the only cleft lip and palate surgeon in Northern Ireland, and carries out 250 operations a year at the Royal Belfast Hospital for Sick Children. Like the rest of the OPSA team, Hill gives up his free time to travel to Pakistan to operate and teach.

Zahid Rafique is a consultant anaesthetist at Hull & East Yorkshire NHS Trusts. Rafique has been travelling to Pakistan with the OPSA team for 12 years and is in charge of procuring all medical supplies and equipment for the camps.

== Ambassadors ==
Ambassadors for the charity include England & Yorkshire cricketer Adil Rashid, BBC journalist Kate Adie CBE, actresses Stephanie Cole and Debra Stephenson. Trustees for the charity include Ariel Bruce.
