= 6 Days (2017 film) =

2017 film by Toa Fraser

- Theatrical release poster
- Directed by: Toa Fraser
- Screenplay by: Glenn Standring
- Produced by: Matthew Metcalfe
- Starring: Jamie Bell; Abbie Cornish; Mark Strong; Martin Shaw; Emun Elliott; Ben Turner; Aymen Hamdouchi; Tim Pigott-Smith; Robert Portal; Colin Garlick; Andrew Grainger; Martin Hancock
- Cinematography: Aaron Morton
- Edited by: John Gilbert; Dan Kircher
- Music by: Lachlan Anderson
- Production companies: New Zealand Film Commission; General Film Corporation; XYZ Films; Ingenious Media
- Distributed by: Icon Film Distribution (United Kingdom); Transmission Films (New Zealand)
- Release dates: 4 August 2017 (NZIFF); 3 November 2017 (United Kingdom)
- Running time: 94 minutes
- Countries: United Kingdom; New Zealand
- Language: English
- Box office: $316,946

6 Days is a 2017 action thriller film directed by Toa Fraser and written by Glenn Standring. A British-New Zealand production, it is based on the 1980 Iranian Embassy siege in London and stars Jamie Bell, Abbie Cornish, Mark Strong, and Martin Shaw.

The siege situation is presented from three perspectives: that of negotiator Max Vernon (Mark Strong), SAS leader Rusty Firmin (Jamie Bell) and BBC news reporter Kate Adie (Abbie Cornish). The film was released on 4 August 2017 to mixed reviews and was subsequently streamed by Netflix.

== Plot ==
On 30 April 1980, six Iranian Arabs storm the Iranian Embassy located at 16 Princes Gate, Kensington in London and hold at least 26 hostages including PC Trevor Lock. Notable persons have been summoned by the incident, including SAS members led by Lance Corporal Rusty Firmin, BBC reporter Kate Adie, and Chief Inspector Max Vernon of the Metropolitan Police. The authorities receive a call from the terrorists' leader, Salim, demanding the release of 91 Arab prisoners in Iran, or else they will kill a hostage at noon the following day.

On the second day, Max negotiates with Salim by phone, saying that Max will help him by any means to avoid violence. The SAS team prepares to storm the building just before noon, but Salim releases one hostage, due to illness. After Max brings food to the terrorists, Salim reluctantly agrees to extend the deadline by 48 hours, demanding safe passage to Heathrow Airport accompanied by ambassadors from the Arab League.

Over the next two days, Salim calls again, demanding to speak with the ambassadors. Salim's right-hand man, Faisal, takes one hostage to be killed. However, the Iranian authorities refuse to be part of the negotiation. Salim calls Max, demanding to speak to the BBC, and Max reluctantly agrees. Afterwards, Salim reluctantly releases another hostage while Trevor contemplates a takeover with a hidden revolver. Meanwhile, the SAS team prepare a plan for rescuing the hostages while they are aboard the bus en route to the airport, but this plan is vetoed by the Prime Minister, who is adamant that the government will not give in to any of the terrorists' demands, even cosmetically. Reluctantly, the SAS return to the original plan of storming the building.

On the fifth day, as per Salim's demand, the BBC World Service broadcasts the terrorists' statement, giving the reason for their actions as the oppression by the Iranian government in Arabistan. Hearing the news, Salim thanks Max and releases two hostages.

On the sixth day, Faisal kills a hostage after the demand of bringing the bus is not met. With that, Home Secretary Whitelaw authorises the SAS operation and Vernon is instructed to do anything to stall or distract the terrorists from the assault.

During the assault, led by Firmin, Salim and three of the other terrorists are killed, at the cost of one of the hostages and one of the SAS men being badly burned on his left leg. While the hostages are being led outside, Firmin recognises Faisal hiding among them and kills him before he can use a grenade. Outside the Embassy, the hostages are detained and searched, revealing the sixth and last terrorist trying to hide among them, and he is arrested. A shaken Vernon telephones his wife to reassure her that he is safe, and the SAS team rides back to Hereford, hearing the Prime Minister's effusive praise of them and the Metropolitan Police on the radio.

In the aftermath of the raid; 15 years later, Rusty retired from the SAS; Kate became the Chief News reporter of BBC; Max became Chief Superintendent of the Metropolitan Police and Lock was awarded the George Medal. The final terrorist was sentenced to 27 years in British prison, being paroled in 2008, while the terrorists killed in the attack were buried in unmarked graves.

== Cast ==
- Jamie Bell – Rusty Firmin
- Mark Strong – Chief Inspector Max Vernon
- Abbie Cornish – Kate Adie
- Martin Shaw – Deputy Assistant Commissioner John Dellow
- Ben Turner – Salim (known as Oan Ali Mohammed in real life)
- Emun Elliott – Roy
- Andrew Grainger – Ray
- Colin Garlick – John McAleese
- Ronan Vibert – MI6 Spokesman
- Tim Downie – Jimmy
- Matthew Sunderland – Tom Lovett
- Ryan O'Kane – Snapper
- Michael Denkha – Mustapha Karkouti
- Joel Beckett – Copper 3
- Martin Hancock – Bill
- John Henshaw – Police Spokesman
- Tim Pigott-Smith – William Whitelaw, 1st Viscount Whitelaw
- Robert Portal – Colonel Michael Rose, Commanding Officer of 22 Special Air Service Regiment (22 SAS)
- Colin Moy - Major Hector Gullan, B Squadron Commander
- John Ramm – Tony Crabb
- Jeff Szusterman – Male Translator
- Jared Turner – Tommy Palmer
- Fayssal Bazzi – Makki
- Toby Leach - PC Trevor Lock
- Sam Sneddon - Sim Harris

== Production ==
6 Days is an action thriller film directed by Toa Fraser and written by Glenn Standring. It is a UK-New Zealand production.

== Release ==
The film was released on 4 August 2017 and was subsequently streamed by Netflix.

The film was distributed by Icon Film Distribution in the UK and Transmission Films in New Zealand.

== Reception ==
On the review aggregator website Rotten Tomatoes, 63% of 32 critics' reviews are positive, with an average rating of 6.3/10. The website's consensus reads: "6 Days effectively unravels its fact-based tale in the form of a taut—albeit unambitious—thriller that captures its era with a minimum of flair." Metacritic, which uses a weighted average, assigned the film a score of 36 out of 100, based on 7 critics, indicating "generally unfavorable" reviews.

The Guardian described the film as "thoughtful, well-made, with a couple of excellent performances – and just a bit dull. ... The best scenes involve the SAS".

The Times gave it 4 stars and wrote the story "is given the action-movie treatment in this pleasing and unexpectedly thoughtful drama."

Radio Times gave it 4 stars and wrote it provided "us with a taut, detailed thriller that re-creates a significant chapter in the history of international terrorism."

Television journalist Kate Adie, who covered the siege for BBC TV, offered a positive comment about the accuracy of the presentation of her role as a journalist, which is not always presented so accurately in the popular media.

== See also ==
- List of New Zealand films
