= Iranian Embassy siege =

1980 hostage situation in London

- Part of Arab separatism in Khuzestan
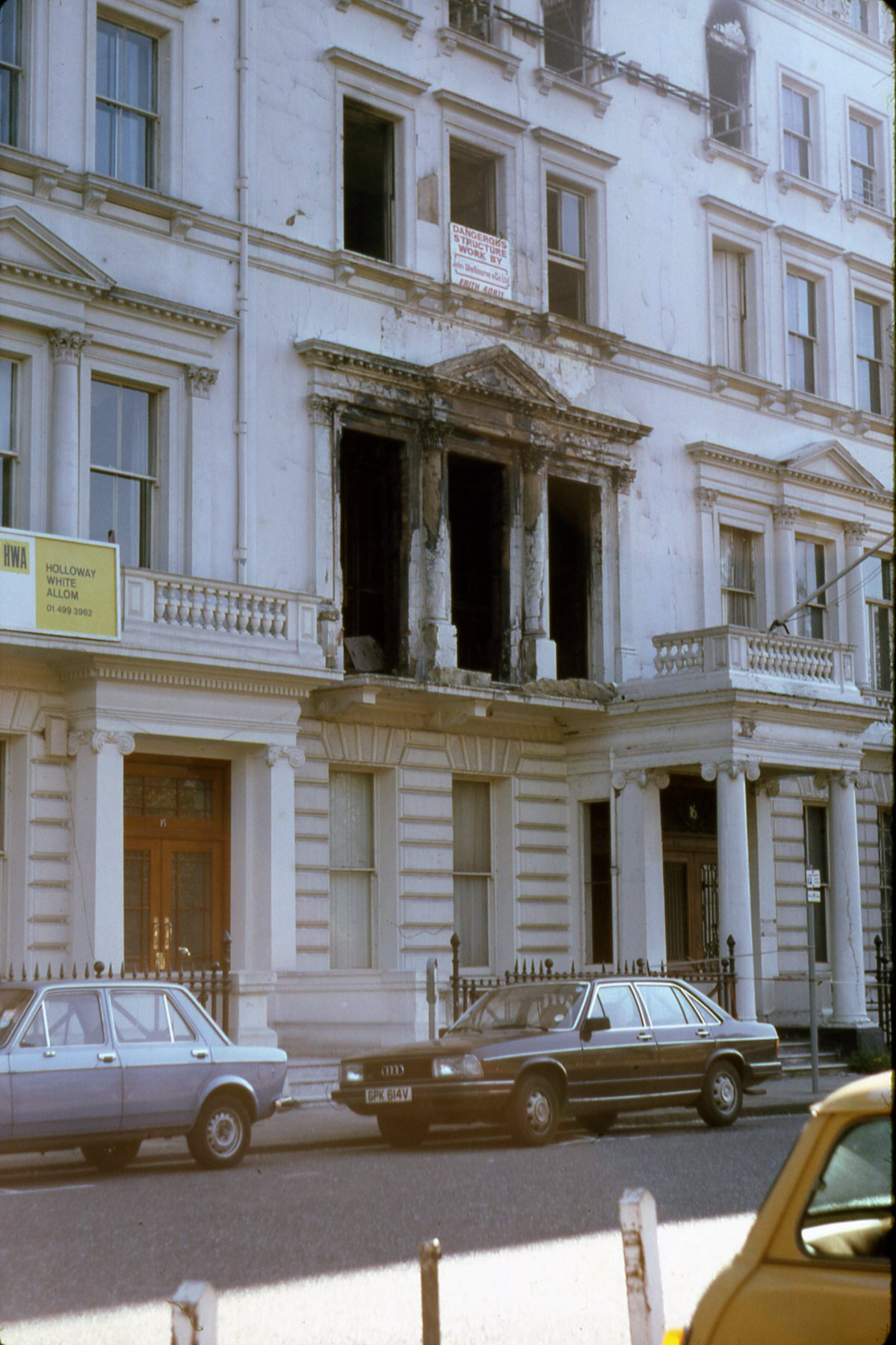
- The Iranian Embassy, severely damaged by fire following the end of the siege
Date	30 April – 5 May 1980
Location	16 Prince's Gate, South Kensington, London, England 51°30′5.5″N 0°10′20.5″W
Result	Embassy recaptured after six-day siege

Belligerents
United Kingdom	Democratic Revolutionary Front for the Liberation of Arabistan (DRFLA)

Commanders and leaders
Peter de la Billière; Michael Rose	Oan Ali Mohammed †

Strength
30–35 SAS soldiers, large numbers of Metropolitan Police officers	6 DRFLA members

Casualties and losses
Two hostages killed (one prior to assault, one during); two hostages wounded during the assault; one SAS soldier wounded	Five killed, one captured

The Iranian Embassy siege took place from 30 April to 5 May 1980, after a group of six armed men stormed the Iranian embassy on Prince's Gate in South Kensington, London.

The gunmen, Iranian Arabs campaigning for the sovereignty of the Khuzestan Province of Iran, took 26 people hostage, including embassy staff, several visitors, and a police officer who had been guarding the embassy. They demanded the release of prisoners in Khuzestan and their own safe passage out of the United Kingdom. The British government quickly decided that safe passage would not be granted and a siege ensued. Subsequently, police negotiators secured the release of five hostages in exchange for minor concessions, such as the broadcasting of the hostage-takers' demands on British television.

By the sixth day of the siege, the gunmen were increasingly frustrated at the lack of progress in meeting their demands. That evening, they killed a hostage and threw his body out of the embassy. The British Special Air Service (SAS) initiated "Operation Nimrod" to rescue the remaining hostages, abseiling from the roof and forcing entry through the windows. During the 17-minute raid, they rescued all but one of the remaining hostages and killed five of the six hostage-takers. The sole remaining gunman served 27 years in prison in Britain. The operation brought the SAS to the public eye for the first time and bolstered the reputation of Margaret Thatcher's government. The SAS was quickly overwhelmed by the number of applications it received from people inspired by the operation and experienced greater demand for its expertise from foreign governments. Damaged by a fire which started during the assault, the embassy building did not reopen until 1993.

The SAS raid, televised live on a bank holiday evening, became a defining moment in British history and proved a career boost for several journalists; it became the subject of multiple documentaries and works of fiction, including several films, television series and video games.

== History ==
The hostage-takers were members of the Democratic Revolutionary Front for the Liberation of Arabistan (DRFLA), Iranian Arabs calling for the establishment of an autonomous Arab state in the southern region of the Iranian province of Khuzestan which is home to an Arabic-speaking minority. The oil-rich area had become the source of much of Iran's wealth, having been developed by multi-national companies during the reign of the Pahlavi dynasty.

According to Oan Ali Mohammed, (Note: Also spelt "Awn", codenamed "Salim" by the police.) it was the suppression of the Arab sovereignty movement that led him to attack the Iranian Embassy in London. The plan was inspired by the Iran hostage crisis in which supporters of the revolution held the staff of the American Embassy in Tehran hostage.

=== Arrival in London ===
Using Iraqi passports, Oan and three other members of the DRFLA arrived in London on 31 March 1980 and rented a flat in Earl's Court, West London. They claimed they had met by chance on the flight. Over the following days, the group swelled, with up to a dozen men in the flat on one occasion.

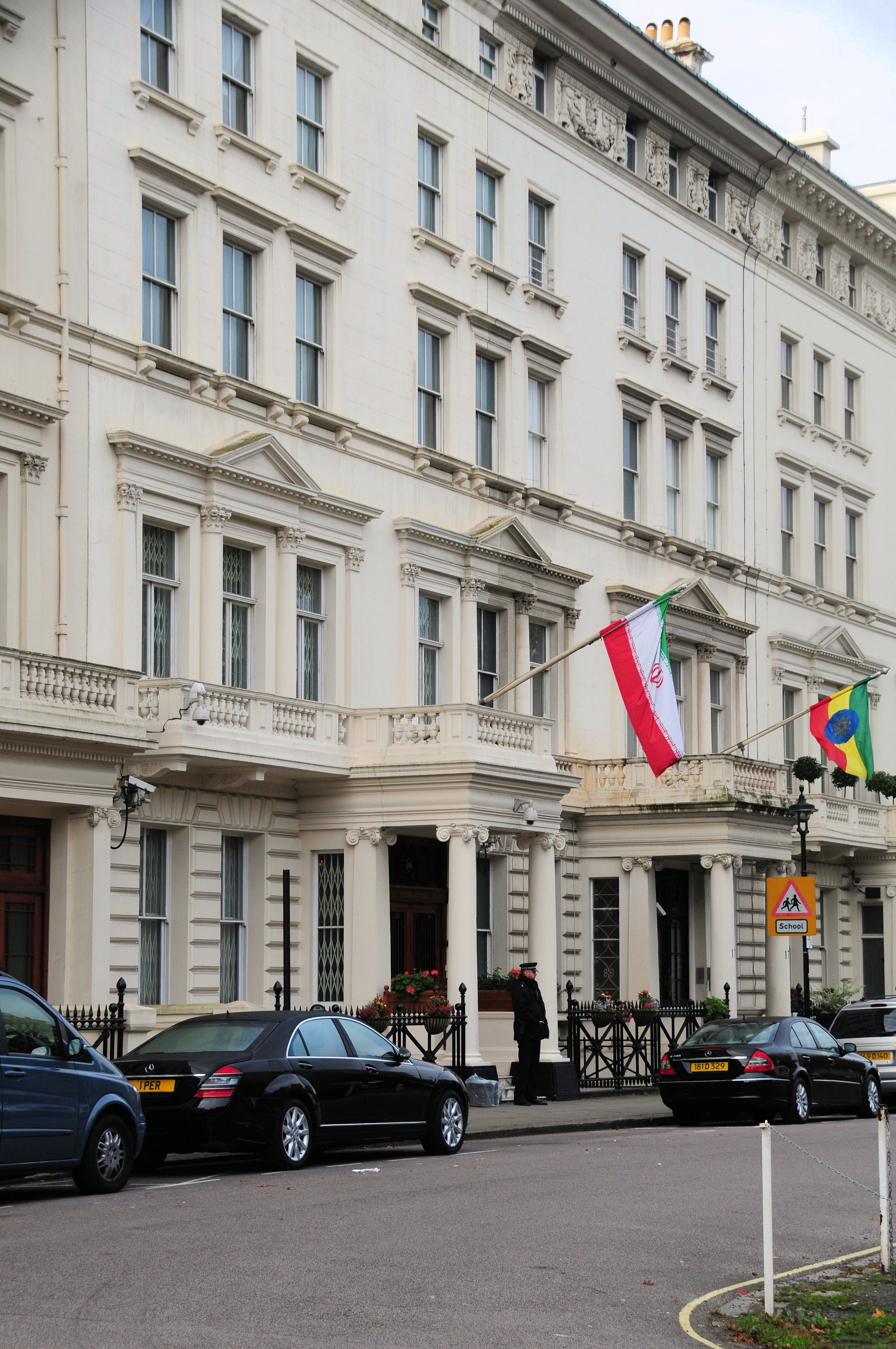
The front of the Iranian embassy in 2008

Oan was 27 and from Khūzestān; he had studied at the University of Tehran, where he became politically active. He had been imprisoned by SAVAK, the Shah's secret police, and bore scars which he said were from torture in SAVAK custody. The other members of his group were Shakir Abdullah Radhil, known as "Faisal", Oan's second-in-command who also claimed to have been tortured by SAVAK; Shakir Sultan Said, or "Hassan"; Themir Moammed Hussein, or Abbas; Fowzi Badavi Nejad, or "Ali"; and Makki Hanoun Ali, the youngest of the group, who went by the name of "Makki".

On 30 April the men informed their landlord that they were going to Bristol for a week and then returning to Iraq, stated that they would no longer require the flat, and arranged for their belongings to be sent to Iraq. They left the building at 09:30 (BST) on 30 April. Their initial destination is unknown, but en route to the Iranian Embassy they collected firearms (including pistols and submachine guns), ammunition and hand grenades. The weapons, predominantly Soviet-made, are believed to have been smuggled into the United Kingdom in a diplomatic bag belonging to Iraq. Shortly before 11:30, and almost two hours after vacating the nearby flat in Lexham Gardens in South Kensington, the six men arrived outside the embassy.

According to a 2014 academic study into the Iran–Iraq War (which broke out later in 1980), the attackers were "recruited and trained" by the Iraqi government as part of a campaign of subversion against Iran, which included sponsorship of several separatist movements.

=== Special Air Service ===
The Special Air Service (SAS) is a regiment of the British Army and part of the United Kingdom's special forces, originally formed in the Second World War to conduct irregular warfare. Western European governments were prompted to form specialist police and military counter-terrorist units following the Munich massacre at the 1972 Olympic Games, during which a police operation to end a hostage crisis ended in chaos. In the resulting firefight, a police officer, most of the hostage-takers, and all of the hostages were killed. In response, West Germany created GSG 9, widely regarded as the first modern dedicated tactical counter-terrorism and hostage-rescue unit, and was quickly followed by the French GIGN.

Following these examples, the British government, worried that the country was unprepared for a similar crisis in the United Kingdom, ordered the formation of the Counter Revolutionary Warfare (CRW) Wing of the SAS. This became the UK's primary anti-terrorist and anti-hijacking unit. The SAS had taken part in counter-insurgency operations abroad since 1945 and had provided training to the protective teams of foreign officials whose security was regarded as important for regional stability and British foreign policy. As a result, it was considered better prepared for the role than any unit in the UK police or elsewhere in the British armed forces. The CRW Wing's first overseas deployment came during the hijacking of Lufthansa Flight 181 in 1977, when two SAS members were sent by the British government as liaison officers in an advisory and support capacity to assist the German authorities, their primary task being to draw on regional knowledge of the Arabian Peninsula gained during their SAS service, liaise with local authorities in the region, and provide auxiliary tactical assistance as GSG 9 planned and carried out the rescue operation.

== Siege ==
=== Day one: 30 April ===
At approximately 11:30 on Wednesday 30 April the six heavily armed members of DRFLA stormed the Iranian Embassy building on Prince's Gate, South Kensington. The gunmen quickly overpowered PC Trevor Lock of the Metropolitan Police's Diplomatic Protection Group (DPG). Lock was carrying a concealed Smith & Wesson .38-calibre revolver, but was unable to draw it before he was overpowered, although he did manage to press the "panic button" on his radio. Lock was later frisked, but the gunman conducting the search did not find the constable's weapon. He remained in possession of the revolver, and to keep it concealed he refused to remove his coat, which he told the gunmen was to "preserve his image" as a police officer. The officer also refused offers of food throughout the siege for fear that the weapon would be seen if he had to use the toilet and a gunman decided to escort him.

Although the majority of the people in the embassy were captured, three managed to escape—two by climbing out of a ground-floor window and the third by climbing across a first-floor parapet to the Ethiopian Embassy next door. A fourth person, Gholam-Ali Afrouz, the chargé d'affaires and thus most senior Iranian official present, briefly escaped by jumping out of a first-floor window, but was injured in the process and quickly captured. Afrouz and the 25 other hostages were all taken to a room on the second floor. The majority of the hostages were embassy staff, predominantly Iranian nationals, but several British employees were also captured. The other hostages were all visitors, with the exception of Lock, the British police officer guarding the embassy. Afrouz had been appointed to the position less than a year before, his predecessor having been dismissed after the revolution. Abbas Fallahi, who had been a butler before the revolution, was appointed the doorman by Afrouz. One of the British members of staff was Ron Morris, from Battersea, who had worked for the embassy in various positions since 1947.

During the course of the siege, police and journalists established the identities of several other hostages. Mustapha Karkouti was a journalist covering the crisis at the US Embassy in Tehran and was at the embassy for an interview with Abdul Fazi Ezzati, the cultural attaché. Muhammad Hashir Faruqi was another journalist, at the embassy to interview Afrouz for an article on the Iranian Revolution. Simeon "Sim" Harris and Chris Cramer, both employees of the BBC, were at the embassy attempting to obtain visas to visit Iran, hoping to cover the aftermath of the 1979 revolution, after several unsuccessful attempts. They found themselves sitting next to Moutaba Mehrnavard, who was there to consult Ahmad Dadgar, the embassy's medical adviser, and Ali Asghar Tabatabai, who was collecting a map for use in a presentation he had been asked to give at the end of a course he had been attending.

Police arrived at the embassy almost immediately after the first reports of gunfire, and, within ten minutes, seven DPG officers were on the scene. The officers moved to surround the embassy, but retreated when a gunman appeared at a window and threatened to open fire. Deputy Assistant Commissioner John Dellow arrived nearly 30 minutes later and took command of the operation. Dellow established a temporary headquarters in his car before moving it to the Royal School of Needlework further down Prince's Gate and then to 24 Prince's Gate, a nursery school. From his various command posts, Dellow coordinated the police response, including the deployment of D11, the Metropolitan Police's marksmen, (Note: British police officers do not routinely carry firearms.) and officers with specialist surveillance equipment. Police negotiators, led by Max Vernon, made contact with Oan via a field telephone passed through one of the embassy windows, and were assisted by a negotiator and a psychiatrist. At 15:15 Oan issued the DRFLA's first demand, the release of 91 Arabs held in prisons in Khūzestān, and threatened to blow up the embassy and the hostages if this were not done by noon on 1 May.

Large numbers of journalists were on the scene quickly and were moved into a holding area to the west of the front of the embassy, while dozens of Iranian protesters also arrived near the embassy and remained there throughout the siege. A separate police command post was established to contain the protests, which descended into violent confrontations with the police on several occasions. Shortly after the beginning of the crisis, the British government's emergency committee COBR (Note: pronounced "cobra".) was assembled. COBR is made up of ministers, civil servants and expert advisers, including representatives from the police and the armed forces. The meeting was chaired by William Whitelaw, the Home Secretary, as Margaret Thatcher, the Prime Minister, was unavailable.

The Iranian government accused the British and American governments of sponsoring the attack as revenge for the ongoing siege of the US Embassy in Tehran. Given the lack of co-operation from Iran, Thatcher, kept apprised of the situation by Whitelaw, determined that British law would be applied to the embassy. At 16:30, the gunmen released their first hostage, Frieda Mozaffarian. She had been unwell since the siege began, and Oan had asked for a doctor to be sent into the embassy to treat her, but the police refused. The other hostages deceived Oan into believing that Mozaffarian was pregnant, and Oan eventually released Mozaffarian after her condition deteriorated.

=== Day two: 1 May ===
The COBR meetings continued through the night and into Thursday. Meanwhile, two teams were dispatched from the headquarters of the Special Air Service (SAS) near Hereford, and arrived at a holding area in Regent's Park Barracks. The teams, from B Squadron, complemented by specialists from other squadrons, were equipped with CS gas, stun grenades, and explosives and armed with Browning Hi-Power pistols and Heckler & Koch MP5 submachine guns. (Note: Most team members were issued with standard model MP5s, but there were not enough available at such short notice, so several members were issued with the shorter MP5K variant and two were armed with the MP5SD, with built-in suppressor.) Lieutenant-Colonel Michael Rose, commander of 22 SAS, had travelled ahead of the detachment and introduced himself to Dellow, the commander of the police operation. At approximately 03:30 on 1 May, one of the SAS teams moved into the building next door to the embassy, normally occupied by the Royal College of General Practitioners, where they were briefed on Rose's "immediate action" plan, to be implemented should the SAS be required to storm the building before a more sophisticated plan could be formed.

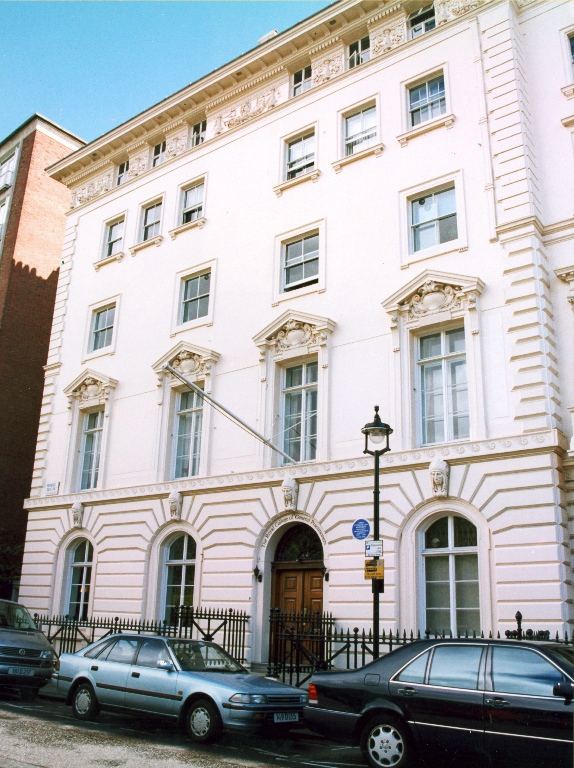
The front of 14 Prince's Gate, head office of the Royal College of General Practitioners, which was used as a base by the SAS during the siege.

Early in the morning of 1 May, the gunmen ordered one of the hostages to telephone the BBC's news desk. During the call, Oan took the receiver and spoke directly to the BBC journalist. He identified the group to which the gunmen belonged and stated that the non-Iranian hostages would not be harmed, but refused to allow the journalist to speak to any other hostages. At some point during the day, the police disabled the embassy's telephone lines, leaving the hostage-takers just the field telephone for outside communication. As the hostages woke up, Chris Cramer, a journalist producer for the BBC, appeared to become seriously ill. He and three other non-Arab hostages had decided one of them must get out, and to do this, he had convincingly exaggerated the symptoms of an existing illness. His colleague, Sim Harris, was taken to the field telephone to negotiate for a doctor. The police negotiator refused the request, instead telling Harris to persuade Oan to release Cramer. The ensuing negotiations between Harris, Oan, and the police took up most of the morning, and Cramer was eventually released at 11:15. He was rushed to hospital in an ambulance, accompanied by police officers sent to gather information from him.

As the deadline of noon approached, set the previous day for the release of the Arab prisoners, the police became convinced that the gunmen did not have the capability to carry out their threat of blowing up the embassy, and persuaded Oan to agree to a new deadline of 14:00. The police allowed the deadline to pass, to no immediate response from the gunmen. During the afternoon, Oan altered his demands, requesting that the British media broadcast a statement of the group's grievances and for ambassadors of three Arab countries to negotiate the group's safe passage out of the UK once the statement had been broadcast.

At approximately 20:00, Oan became agitated by noises coming from the Ethiopian Embassy next door. The noise came from technicians who were drilling holes in the wall to implant listening devices, but PC Trevor Lock, when asked to identify the sound, attributed it to mice. COBR decided to create ambient noise to cover the sound created by the technicians and instructed British Gas to commence drilling in an adjacent road, supposedly to repair a gas main. The drilling was aborted after it agitated the gunmen, and instead British Airports Authority, owner of London Heathrow Airport, was told to instruct approaching aircraft to fly over the embassy at low altitude.

=== Day three: 2 May ===
At 09:30 on 2 May, Oan appeared at the first-floor window of the embassy to demand access to the telex system, which the police had disabled along with the telephone lines, and threatened to kill Abdul Fazi Ezzati, the cultural attaché. The police refused and Oan pushed Ezzati, whom he had been holding at gunpoint at the window, across the room, before demanding to speak to somebody from the BBC who knew Sim Harris. The police, relieved to have a demand to which they could easily agree, produced Tony Crabb, managing director of BBC Television News and Harris's boss. Oan shouted his demands—for safe passage out of the UK, to be negotiated by three ambassadors from Arab countries—to Crabb from the first-floor window, and instructed that they should be broadcast along with a statement of the hostage-takers' aims by the BBC. The Foreign and Commonwealth Office informally approached the embassies of Algeria, Jordan, Kuwait, Lebanon, Syria and Qatar to ask if their ambassadors would be willing to talk to the hostage-takers. The Jordanian ambassador immediately refused and the other five said they would consult their governments. The BBC broadcast the statement that evening, but in a form unsatisfactory to Oan, who considered it to be truncated and incorrect.

Meanwhile, the police located the embassy caretaker and took him to their forward headquarters to brief the SAS and senior police officers. He informed them that the embassy's front door was reinforced by a steel security door, and that the windows on the ground floor and first floor were fitted with armoured glass, the result of recommendations made after the SAS had been asked to review security arrangements for the embassy several years earlier. Plans for entering the embassy by battering the front door and ground-floor windows were quickly scrapped and work began on other ideas.

=== Day four: 3 May ===
Oan, angered by the BBC's incorrect reporting of his demands the previous evening, contacted the police negotiators shortly after 06:00 and accused the authorities of deceiving him. He demanded to speak with an Arab ambassador, but the negotiator on duty claimed that talks were still being arranged by the Foreign Office. Recognising the delaying tactic, Oan told the negotiator that the British hostages would be the last to be released because of the British authorities' deceit. He added that a hostage would be killed unless Tony Crabb was brought back to the embassy. Crabb did not arrive at the embassy until 15:30, nearly ten hours after Oan demanded his presence, to the frustration of both Oan and Sim Harris. Oan then relayed another statement to Crabb via Mustapha Karkouti, a journalist also being held hostage in the embassy. The police guaranteed that the statement would be broadcast on the BBC's next news bulletin, in exchange for the release of two hostages. The hostages decided amongst themselves that the two to be released would be Hiyech Kanji and Ali-Guil Ghanzafar; the former as she was pregnant and the latter for no other reason than his loud snoring, which kept the other hostages awake at night and irritated the terrorists.

Later in the evening, at approximately 23:00, an SAS team reconnoitred the roof of the embassy. They discovered a skylight, and succeeded in unlocking it for potential use as an access point, should they later be required to storm the building. They also attached ropes to the chimneys to allow soldiers to abseil down the building and gain access through the windows if necessary.

=== Day five: 4 May ===
During the day, the Foreign Office held further talks with diplomats from Arabian countries in the hope of persuading them to go to the embassy and talk to the hostage-takers. The talks, hosted by Douglas Hurd, ended in stalemate. The diplomats insisted they must be able to offer safe passage out of the UK for the gunmen, believing this to be the only way to guarantee a peaceful outcome, but the British government was adamant that safe passage would not be considered under any circumstances. Karkouti, through whom Oan had issued his revised demands the previous day, became increasingly ill throughout the day and by the evening was feverish, which led to suggestions that the police had spiked the food that had been sent into the embassy. John Dellow, the commander of the police operation, had apparently considered the idea and even consulted a doctor about its viability, but eventually dismissed it as "impracticable".

The SAS officers involved in the operation, including Brigadier Peter de la Billière, Director SAS, Rose, and Major Hector Gullan spent the day refining their plans for an assault.

=== Day six: 5 May ===
Oan woke Lock at dawn, convinced that an intruder was in the embassy. Lock was sent to investigate, but no intruder was found. Later in the morning, Oan called Lock to examine a bulge in the wall separating the Iranian embassy from the Ethiopian embassy next door. The bulge had, in fact, been caused by the removal of bricks to allow an assault team to break through the wall and to implant listening devices, resulting in a weakening of the wall. Although Lock assured him that he did not believe the police were about to storm the building, Oan remained convinced that they were "up to something" and moved the male hostages from the room in which they had spent the last four days to another down the hall. Tensions rose throughout the morning and, at 13:00, Oan told the police that he would kill a hostage unless he was able to speak to an Arab ambassador within 45 minutes. At 13:40, Lock informed the negotiator that the gunmen had taken Abbas Lavasani, the embassy's chief press officer, downstairs and were preparing to execute him. According to Lock, Lavasani was "like an innocent lamb, offering himself up to the slaughter" and that "if they were going to kill a hostage, he wanted it to be him." At exactly 13:45, 45 minutes after Oan's demand to speak to an ambassador, three shots were heard from inside the embassy.

Whitelaw, who had been chairing the COBR crisis meeting during the siege, was rushed back to Whitehall from a function he had been attending in Slough, roughly 20 miles (30 km) away, arriving 19 minutes after the shots had been reported. He was briefed on the SAS plan by de la Billière, who told him to expect that up to 40 percent of the hostages would be killed in an assault. After deliberations, Whitelaw instructed the SAS to prepare to assault the building at short notice, an order that was received by Lieutenant-Colonel Rose at 15:50. By 17:00, the SAS were in a position to assault the embassy at ten minutes' notice. The police negotiators recruited the imam from Regent's Park Mosque at 18:20, fearing that a "crisis point" had been reached, and asked him to talk to the gunmen. Three further shots were fired during the course of the imam's conversation with Oan. Oan announced that a hostage had been killed, and the rest would die in 30 minutes unless his demands were met. A few minutes later, Lavasani's body was dumped out of the front door. Upon a preliminary examination, conducted at the scene, a forensic pathologist estimated that Lavasani had been dead for at least an hour, meaning he could not have been killed by the three most recent shots, and leading the police to believe that two hostages had been killed. In fact, only Lavasani had been shot.

After Lavasani's body had been recovered, Sir David McNee, Commissioner of the Metropolitan Police, contacted the Home Secretary to request approval to hand control of the operation over to the British Army, under the provisions of military aid to the civil authorities. Whitelaw relayed the request to Thatcher, and the prime minister agreed immediately. Thus John Dellow, the ranking police officer at the embassy, signed over control of the operation to Lieutenant-Colonel Rose at 19:07, authorising Rose to order an assault at his discretion. The signed note is now on display at New Scotland Yard's Crime Museum. Meanwhile, the police negotiators began stalling Oan. They offered concessions in order to distract him and prevent him killing further hostages, buying time for the SAS to make its final preparations for the now-inevitable assault.

== SAS assault ==
The two SAS teams on-scene, Red Team and Blue Team, were ordered to begin their simultaneous assaults, under the codename Operation Nimrod, at 19:23. One group of four men from Red Team abseiled from the roof down the rear of the building, while another four-man team lowered a stun grenade through the skylight. The detonation of the stun grenade was supposed to coincide with the abseiling teams' detonating explosives to gain entry to the building through the second-floor windows. During the descent, one of the abseilers became entangled in his rope. While trying to assist him, one of the other soldiers accidentally smashed a window with his foot. The noise of the breaking window alerted Oan, who was on the first floor communicating with the police negotiators, and he went to investigate. The soldiers were unable to use explosives in case they injured their stranded comrade, but managed to smash their way in using sledgehammers.

Sim Harris making his escape across the first-floor balcony, as ordered by the masked SAS trooper (John T. McAleese; far right)

After the first soldiers entered, a fire started and travelled up the curtains and out of the second-floor window, severely burning the stranded soldier. A second wave of abseilers cut him free, and he fell to the balcony below before entering the embassy. Slightly behind Red Team, Blue Team detonated explosives on a first-floor window, forcing Sim Harris—who had just run into the room—to take cover. Much of the operation at the front of the embassy took place in full view of the assembled journalists and was broadcast on live television, and Harris's escape across the parapet of a first-floor balcony was famously captured on video.

As the soldiers emerged onto the first-floor landing, Lock tackled Oan to prevent him attacking the SAS operatives. Oan, still armed, was subsequently shot dead by one of the soldiers. Meanwhile, further teams entered the embassy through the back door and cleared the ground floor and cellar. During the raid, the gunmen holding the male hostages opened fire on their captives, killing Ali Akbar Samadzadeh and wounding two others. The SAS began evacuating hostages, taking them down the stairs towards the back door of the embassy. Two of the terrorists were hiding amongst the hostages; one of them produced a hand grenade when he was identified. An SAS soldier, who was unable to shoot for concern of hitting a hostage or another soldier, pushed the grenade-wielding terrorist to the bottom of the stairs, where two other soldiers shot him dead.

The raid lasted seventeen minutes and involved 30 to 35 soldiers. The terrorists killed one hostage and seriously wounded two others during the raid while the SAS killed all but one of the terrorists. The rescued hostages and the remaining terrorist, who was still concealed amongst them, were taken into the embassy's back garden and restrained on the ground while they were identified. The last terrorist was identified by Sim Harris and led away by the SAS.

== Hostages ==
Hostage	Occupation	Fate
Gholam-Ali Afrouz	Embassy Chargé d'affaires	wounded during assault
Shirazeh Bouroumand	Embassy secretary	liberated
Chris Cramer	BBC sound organiser	released prior to assault
Ahmad Dadgar	Medical adviser	wounded during assault
Abdul Fazi Ezzati	Iranian cultural attaché	liberated
Abbas Fallahi	Embassy doorman	liberated
Muhammad Hashir Faruqi	British-Pakistani editor of Impact International	liberated
Ali Guil Ghanzafar	Pakistani tourist	released prior to assault
Sim Harris	BBC sound recordist	liberated
Nooshin Hashemenian	Embassy secretary	liberated
Roya Kaghachi	Secretary to Afrouz	liberated
Haydeh Sanei Kanji	Embassy secretary	released prior to assault
Mustapha Karkouti	Syrian journalist	released prior to assault
Vahid Khabaz	Iranian student	liberated
Abbas Lavasani	Chief Press Officer	killed prior to assault
PC Trevor Lock	Metropolitan Police Constable, Diplomatic Protection Group	liberated—Lock (14 April 1939 – 30 March 2025) was subsequently awarded the George Medal
Moutaba Mehrnavard	Carpet dealer	liberated
Aboutaleb Jishverdi-Moghaddam	Iranian attaché	liberated
Muhammad Moheb	Embassy accountant	liberated
Ronald Morris	Embassy manager and chauffeur	liberated
Frieda Mozafarian	Press officer	released prior to assault
Issa Naghizadeh	First Secretary	liberated
Ali Akbar Samadzadeh	Temporary employee at embassy	killed during assault by hostage taker
Ali Asghar Tabatabai	Banker	liberated
Kaujouri Muhammad Taghi	Accountant	liberated
Zahra Zomorrodian	Embassy clerk	liberated

== Perpetrators ==
Perpetrator	Role	Fate
"Salim" or "Oan"—Towfiq Ibrahim al-Rashidi	Leader	Killed by SAS
"Faisal"—Shakir Abdullah Radhil	2nd in command	Killed by SAS
"Makki"—Makki Hanoun	Gunman	Killed by SAS
"Abbas"—Themir Mohammed Husein	Gunman	Killed by SAS
"Hassan"—Shakir Sultan Said	Gunman	Killed by SAS
"Ali"—Fowzi Badavi Nejad	Gunman	Detained by SAS and sentenced to life imprisonment. Granted parole in 2008

== Aftermath ==
The ribbon of the George Medal, which was awarded to PC Trevor Lock

After the end of the siege, PC Trevor Lock was widely considered a hero. He was awarded the George Medal, the United Kingdom's second-highest civil honour, for his conduct during the siege and for tackling Oan during the SAS raid, the only time during the siege that he drew his concealed sidearm. In addition, he was honoured with the Freedom of the City of London and in a motion in the House of Commons. Police historian Michael J. Waldren, referring to the television series Dixon of Dock Green, suggested that Lock's restraint in the use of his revolver was "a defining example of the power of the Dixon image", and academic Maurice Punch noted the contrast between Lock's actions and the highly aggressive tactics of the SAS.

Another academic, Steven Moysey, commented on the difference in outcomes between the Iranian Embassy siege and the 1975 Balcombe Street siege, in which the police negotiated the surrender of four Provisional Irish Republican Army members without military involvement. Nonetheless, the siege led to calls for increasing the firepower of the police to enable them to prevent and deal with similar incidents in the future, and an official report recommended that specialist police firearms units, such as the Metropolitan Police's D11, be better resourced and equipped.

Warrant Officer Class 1 Tommy Goodyear was awarded the Queen's Gallantry Medal for his part in the assault, in which he shot dead a terrorist who was apparently about to throw a grenade amongst the hostages. After the operation concluded, the staff sergeant who was caught in his abseil rope was treated at St Stephen's Hospital in Fulham. He suffered serious burns to his legs, but made a full recovery.

The Iranian government welcomed the end of the siege, and declared that the two hostages killed were martyrs for the Iranian Revolution. They also thanked the British government for "the persevering action of your police force during the unjust hostage-taking event at the Embassy".

After the assault concluded, the police conducted an investigation into the siege and the deaths of the two hostages and five terrorists, including the actions of the SAS. The soldiers' weapons were taken away for examination and, the following day, the soldiers themselves were interviewed at length by the police at the regiment's base in Hereford. There was controversy over the deaths of two terrorists in the telex room, where the male hostages were held. Hostages later said in interviews that they had persuaded their captors to surrender and television footage appeared to show them throwing weapons out of the window and holding a white flag. The two SAS soldiers who killed the men both stated at the inquest into the terrorists' deaths that they believed the men had been reaching for weapons before they were shot. The inquest jury reached the verdict that the soldiers' actions were justifiable homicide (later known as "lawful killing").

Fowzi Nejad was the only gunman to survive the SAS assault. After being identified, he was dragged away by an SAS trooper, who allegedly intended to take him back into the building and shoot him. The soldier reportedly changed his mind when it was pointed out to him that the raid was being broadcast on live television. It later emerged that the footage from the back of the embassy was coming from a wireless camera placed in the window of a flat overlooking the embassy. The camera had been installed by ITN technicians, who had posed as guests of a local resident in order to get past the police cordon, which had been in place since the beginning of the siege. Nejad was arrested, and was eventually tried, convicted, and sentenced to life imprisonment for his role in the siege. He became eligible for parole in 2005.

As a foreign national, he would normally have been immediately deported to his home country but Article 3 of the European Convention on Human Rights, incorporated into British law by the Human Rights Act 1998, has been held by the European Court of Human Rights to prohibit deportation in cases where the person concerned would be likely to be tortured or executed in his home country. Nejad was eventually paroled in 2008 and granted leave to remain in the UK, but was not given political asylum. The Home Office released a statement, saying "We do not give refugee status to convicted terrorists. Our aim is to deport people as quickly as possible but the law requires us to first obtain assurances that the person being returned will not face certain death". After 27 years in prison, Nejad was deemed no longer to be a threat to society, but Trevor Lock wrote to the Home Office to oppose his release.

Because it is accepted by the British government that he would be executed or tortured, he cannot be deported to Iran; he now lives in south London, having assumed another identity.

== Long-term impact ==
Members of B Squadron S.A.S. pictured with Diana, Princess of Wales and Prince Charles during a training exercise in 1983

Prior to 1980, London had been the scene of several terrorist incidents related to Middle East politics, including the assassination of Abdullah al-Hagri, former prime minister of the Yemen Arab Republic, and an attack on a coach containing staff from the Israeli airline El Al. Although there were other isolated incidents relating to Middle Eastern and North African politics in the years following the embassy siege, most prominently the murder of Yvonne Fletcher from inside the Libyan embassy in 1984, historian Jerry White believed the resolution of the siege "effectively marked the end of London's three years as a world theatre for the resolution of Middle Eastern troubles".

The SAS raid, codenamed "Operation Nimrod", was broadcast live at peak time on a bank holiday Monday evening and was viewed by millions of people, mostly in the UK, making it a defining moment in British history. Both the BBC and ITV interrupted their scheduled programming, the BBC interrupting the broadcast of the World Snooker Championship final, to show the end of the siege, which proved to be a major career boost for several journalists. Kate Adie, the BBC's duty reporter at the embassy when the SAS assault began, went on to cover Nejad's trial and then to report from war zones across the world and eventually to become chief news correspondent for BBC News, while David Goldsmith and his team, responsible for the hidden camera at the back of the embassy, were awarded a BAFTA for their coverage. The success of the operation, combined with the high profile it was given by the media, invoked a sense of national pride compared to Victory in Europe Day, the end of the Second World War in Europe. The operation was declared "an almost unqualified success". Margaret Thatcher recalled that she was congratulated wherever she went over the following days, and received messages of support and congratulation from other world leaders. However, the incident strained already-tense relations between the UK and Iran following the Iranian Revolution. The Iranian government declared that the siege of the embassy was planned by the British and American governments, and that the hostages who had been killed were martyrs for the Revolution.

Operation Nimrod brought the SAS, a regiment that had fallen into obscurity after its fame during the Second World War (partly owing to the covert nature of its operations), back into the public eye. The regiment was not pleased with its new high profile. Nonetheless, the operation vindicated the SAS, which had been at risk of disbandment and whose use of resources had been considered wasteful. The regiment was quickly overwhelmed by new applicants. Membership of 22 SAS is open only to those currently serving in the Armed Forces (allowing applications from any individual in any service), but the unit also has two regiments from the volunteer Territorial Army (TA): 21 SAS and 23 SAS. Both the TA regiments received hundreds more applications than in previous years, prompting de la Billière to remark that the applicants seemed "convinced that a balaclava helmet and a sub-machine gun would be handed to them over the counter, so that they could go off and conduct embassy-style sieges of their own". Meanwhile, the SAS became a sought-after assignment for career army officers. All three units were forced to introduce additional fitness tests at the start of the application process. The SAS also experienced an increased demand for their expertise in training the forces of friendly countries and those whose collapse was considered not to be in Britain's interest. The government developed a protocol for lending the SAS to foreign governments to assist with hijackings or sieges, and it became fashionable for politicians to be seen associating with the regiment. Despite its new fame, the SAS did not have a high profile during the 1982 Falklands War, partly due to a lack of operations, and next came to the fore during the 1990–1991 Gulf War.

The British government's response to the crisis, and the successful use of force to end it, strengthened the Conservative government of the day and boosted Thatcher's personal credibility. McNee believed that the conclusion of the siege exemplified the British government's policy of refusing to give in to terrorist demands, "nowhere was the effectiveness of this response to terrorism more effectively demonstrated".

The embassy building was severely damaged by fire. It was more than a decade before the British and Iranian governments came to an agreement whereby the United Kingdom would repair the damage to the embassy in London and Iran would pay for repairs to the British embassy in Tehran, which had been damaged during the 1979 Iranian Revolution. Iranian diplomats began working from 16 Prince's Gate again in December 1993.

The DRFLA was undermined by its links with the Iraqi government after it emerged that Iraq had sponsored the training and equipping of the hostage-takers. The Iran–Iraq War started five months after the end of the siege and continued for eight years. The campaign for autonomy of Khūzestān was largely forgotten in the wake of the hostilities, as was the DRFLA.

== Cultural impact ==
As well as factual television documentaries, the dramatic conclusion of the siege inspired a wave of fictional works about the SAS in the form of novels, television programmes, and films. Among them were the 1982 film Who Dares Wins and the 2017 film 6 Days, which was released on Netflix. The siege features in the 2006 video game The Regiment, and Tom Clancy's Rainbow Six Siege—a 2015 tactical shooter video game focusing on counter-terrorism—uses the Iranian Embassy Siege as inspiration, with a playable character named Thatcher having canonically participated in the siege. The SAS also feature in the book Rainbow Six, upon which the game series was based. The embassy siege was referenced multiple times in the television drama Ultimate Force (2002–2008), which stars Ross Kemp as the leader of a fictional SAS unit. As well as fictional representations in media, the siege inspired a version of Palitoy's Action Man figure, clad in black and equipped with a gas mask, mimicking the soldiers who stormed the embassy.

== See also ==
- Attack on the Iranian Embassy in London (2018)
- History of the Special Air Service
- List of hostage crises
- List of terrorist incidents in London
