= Mustapha Karkouti =

Syrian journalist (1943–2020)

- Born: 3 October 1943; Latakia, Syria
- Died: 16 July 2020 (aged 76); London, United Kingdom
- Occupations: Journalist and media consultant
- Known for: Journalism

Mustapha Karkouti (3 October 1943 – 16 July 2020) was a Syrian freelance journalist and media consultant, residing in London since the early 1970s.

== Personal and career background ==
He was born in Latakia in northern Syria. He started as an agency journalist in the 1960s and went on to be a founding member of the Lebanese daily newspaper As-Safir. As its foreign correspondent he was sent to London in the early 1970s where he met his wife in 1977. They were married in 1978.

In 1993 he was elected President of the Foreign Press Association in London. Karkouti was a founding member of the Arab-US Forum, and an elected member of Chatham House Council. He was a frequent guest on TV and radio talk shows, such as BBC News's Dateline London.

== Iranian Embassy siege ==
Whilst arranging a trip to Tehran, he was taken hostage in the 1980 Iranian Embassy siege in London. The hostage-takers, who were primarily Arab, used him to communicate with the police and other hostages. He was released before the British Special Air Service (SAS) stormed the embassy.

Karkouti was portrayed by Michael Denkha in the 2017 film about the embassy siege, 6 Days.
