= Sunderland High School =

Coordinates: 54°53.85′N 1°22.8′W

- Sunderland, Tyne and Wear, SR2 8HY; England

Information
- Type: Private school
- Motto: Timor Domini Principium Sapientiae (Fear of the Lord is the beginning of Wisdom)
- Religious affiliation: Church of England
- Established: 1883
- Closed: 2016
- Department for Education URN: 108874 Tables
- Head: Angela Slater (Senior School); Clive Bulmer (Junior School)
- Gender: Mixed
- Age: 2 to 18
- Enrolment: 287
- Houses: Swift (Blue), Tiger (Red), Panther (Yellow), Drake (Green)
- Affiliation: United Church Schools Trust
- Website: http://www.sunderlandhigh.co.uk/

Sunderland High School was a mixed private day school located in Sunderland, Tyne and Wear, England. Founded in 1883 as the oldest girls' senior school in Sunderland, it merged with a local boys' school to become the current coeducational school. A junior school was later added and is located on a separate site nearby. It is owned by the United Church Schools Trust. The school closed at the end of the 2016 Summer term.

== History ==
The original Sunderland High School was founded in 1883 by the Rector of Bishopwearmouth, Robert Long. Prior to going coeducational, it was the oldest girls' school in the city. After gaining support from local townsfolk as well as the mayor, the school opened in April 1884 with just 16 full-time pupils at 10-11 Park Terrace, now Toward Road. After World War II, the school continued to grow and expand. In 1987, the school celebrated its 100-year heritage by opening the Centenary Building which housed the school's ICT suites.

The sixth form became coeducational and boys were first admitted into the school in 1988. In 1992, it merged with Tonstall School, a long-established boys' day school to become a fully coeducational independent day school. A major programme began at Hendon Hill to build Tonstall House in order to provide a new Junior School and sports hall for the whole school. It was officially opened by The Princess Royal.

The school was praised in the 2005 Independent Schools Inspectorate report, notably for its pastoral care and the quality of its extracurricular provision. The Senior School, Junior School and Nursery all gained national quality awards. In March 2006 it was - according to the national awarding body, BECTA - "one of the first schools in the country to achieve the BECTA ICT Mark". The Junior School was the first school in the country to be awarded the Investors in People Leadership and Management Award.

On 18 January 2016 it was announced that the whole school would be closing at the end of the current academic year due to dropping enrolment and six figure losses.

== Academics ==
In 2009 the school's A Level results were the best in the city with 63% of all entries at A or B grade.

== Buildings ==
The senior school comprised five main buildings including Main School (the original building), Centenary Building, Clifton Hall, Carlton House and Langham Tower. The purpose-built junior school was close by. Pupils from all parts of the school shared the sports facilities which included a sports hall and all-weather pitch.

- Main School - Purpose-built in 1886–1888, it had many of the original features of the time. It housed the large main assembly hall, form rooms, English, Art and the school's main library. The use of this building was transferred to the newer ones. This site also housed the History, Design Technology and Food and Nutrition departments, as well as a canteen.
- Carlton House - The oldest of all the buildings. Formerly Nicholson House, built in 1851 for William Nicholson, who ran a highly successful copper and ships’ metalware business. Main School and Langham Tower were both built in the grounds of this building. It housed the VI Form common room, VI Form ICT facilities and independent study rooms. It boasts a grand staircase.
- Centenary building - Built for the school's centenary (1984), it housed the science labs, well equipped and of suitable size. Also situated there was the Business Studies Department, main ICT facilities and the Geography Department. This building is unusual from the outside, shaped in a large arch, with a road leading to the car park.
- Clifton Hall - Originally two pairs of semi-detached villas, joined in a conversion to a training college in a design by the local authority's education architect Oliver Hall Mark in 1933. It had teaching facilities on the ground floor and residential accommodation above. When the school acquired this building in 2000, the First floor was totally redesigned. The Basement and Second floors are out of bounds and unused. The second floor, in fact was separated into dormitory rooms, some still complete with wardrobes, sinks and period carpets. Clifton Hall was a pastoral base for Year 7 and Year 8. It accommodated Year 7 and 8 form rooms, the Mathematics Department and music and drama facilities. This site also encompassed the nearby Bede gym, formally a university canteen, used for health related fitness. The design of the gym meant that major indoor sports took place in the school's large sports hall on the junior school site. Precisely when the original Clifton Villas went up is not known. However, according to research by planner John Tumman, the estate owner Anthony John Moore, solicitor, water company chairman and mayor, lived next door in Bede Tower from 1852, and is known to have had grandiose plans for villas there as part of the estate development which included grand terraces like Park Place, St Bede's Terrace, Douro Terrace, and Mowbray Villas and Carlton Villas. Clifton Villas were certainly in existence by 1880, when the tenant at No 1 was John Tillman, who with his brother Thomas, designed Sunderland Museum. Nearby Bede Tower, Moore's Italianate home, was formerly part of the University of Sunderland. It housed the school's examination hall. The school also used the large auditorium in this building for theatrical performances.
- Langham Tower - Most recently acquired by the school, Grade II listed and by far the most attractive of the school's buildings. It was opened by former pupil Kate Adie in 2007. Built in the grounds of Carlton House, it boasts a large and beautiful main staircase with large stained glass windows. It was designed by renowned architect William Milburn, built in 1889–1891, for William Adamson, trader in ships' provisions and oil, and son of the well-known shipbuilder who lived in Fawcett Street. Later Langham Tower was occupied by Major Cuthbert Vaux, of Vaux Breweries, and later by Robert Thompson (1850–1908), Shipbuilder. Later it housed Sunderland College of Education, a teacher training college. It housed the Modern Languages Department, Religious Studies, P.E. Theory, Media Studies and a Sixth Form Study, as well as a number of offices.
- Junior School - Built a little way from the main school site in 1994 next to the previous building with the same function. This large building housed the entire Junior school and all of their facilities, with a large assembly hall and a very large sports hall. The Second floor, originally unused, was refurbished and some classrooms were added. The sports hall, sports field and all-weather pitch was shared with the senior school for PE lessons. The sports hall was also used for the annual Speech Day.

== Notable former pupils ==
- Kate Adie - journalist and broadcaster
- Marjorie Arnfield - artist
- Jane Grigson - cookery writer
- Lucinda Lambton - writer, photographer, television presenter and producer
- Eileen O'Shaughnessy - poet, wife of writer George Orwell
- Denise Robertson - writer
- Rachel Howard - artist
