= Specialist investigation department =

The Specialist Investigation Department is a branch of the Criminal Investigation Department of a British police force (although many use different names) which investigates crimes such as murder and sexual offences supplying specially trained officers to monitor known ex-offenders who have a history of sex offences. This unit could be considered the same as Area Major Incident Pool of the Metropolitan Police Service. The Specialist Investigation Officers use the prefix "Detective" in front of their actual police rank. The team also responds to major investigations such as murder when divisional teams can not cope with the sheer amount of work.

== Branches ==
SID branches (Names differ slightly between forces but the objectives remain the same):

- Major Crime Team - Aid divisional CID in major cases such as murder.
- Fraud Squad - Investigates major fraud for example the City of London Police Fraud Squad who police London's financial district.
- Hi-Tech Crime Unit (HTCU) - Computer experts who monitor online sexual predators and assist the other teams in specialist computer monitoring.
- Public Protection Unit (PPU) - Specially trained detectives who monitor known ex-sexual offenders who have been released from prison.
- Organised Crime Unit - A team of officers who investigate organised crime such as bank robberies and crimes involving drugs, committed by career criminals, but not by petty thieves.
- Vulnerability Unit - Officers who provide aftercare of the public and investigation into major crimes against children and Domestic violence.
- Scientific Support Unit - Forensic scientists who support the force in gathering crime scene DNA linking the guilty with the crime and the place, which would often be crucial in court cases.
