= Marjorie Arnfield =

English artist (1930–2001)

Marjorie Helen Arnfield, MBE (25 November 1930 – 26 April 2001) was an English artist who specialised in both industrial and rural landscapes, painting in oil, acrylic and watercolour. Her landscapes, particularly her paintings of Provence and Spain, are characterised by vivid colours and an impressionistic style. In an interview in the magazine Artists & Illustrators in 1998, Arnfield described her palette of colours, which included ochres, burnt siennas, cadmium, viridian, reds and blues, as "colours that sing". Her other work included paintings of British coal mines and floral art. She was awarded an MBE in 2000 in the Millennium Honours List for services to British art.

Arnfield developed juvenile chronic arthritis at the age of four and suffered from this illness throughout her life. However, she didn't allow her disability to limit what she wanted to achieve either artistically or personally.

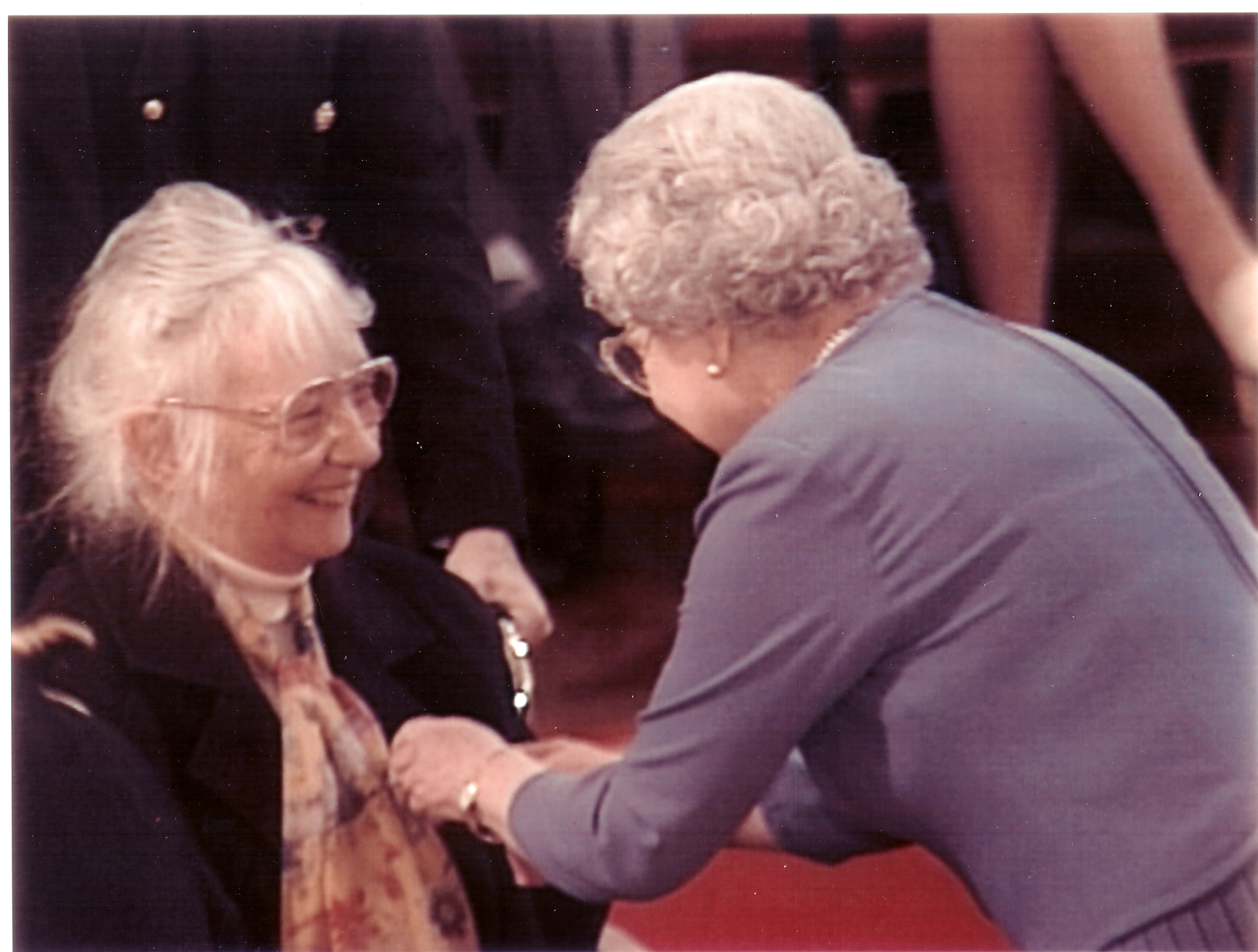
Marjorie Arnfield receiving an MBE from the Queen in 2000 for services to art.

== Biography ==
Marjorie Arnfield was born in Newcastle upon Tyne in 1930 and brought up in Sunderland, attending Sunderland Church High School. Her father was a doctor and her mother was a nurse.

Her paternal grandfather William Milburn, great-uncle Thomas Ridley Milburn, and two uncles were regional architects, responsible for many public buildings in the North East of England, including the Sunderland Empire Theatre. While attending Sunderland College of Art, and King Edward VII College of Art, University of Durham she was taught by distinguished British artists such as Lawrence Gowing and Victor Pasmore as well as by Quentin Bell.

She travelled extensively in the Mediterranean with her late husband, Ron Arnfield. In her paintings of scenes from the Greek islands, France and Spain, she sought to capture the vibrancy of the sun and the natural colours. She also used colour to depict emotion, for example in her mining paintings. Arnfield portrayed the energy and excitement of football when she was invited by Sunderland Football Club to watch one of their games in their new stadium, and then paint a picture of the match.

In a catalogue for an exhibition of Mediterranean Images at the Pierrepoint Gallery in Newark, Nottinghamshire, England in September 1996, Arnfield wrote of the visual inspiration of her passion for the Mediterranean: "Vines dotted in rows across spring landscapes; distant mountains; poppies, stark, clustered among ochre grasses; cypress trees forming punctuation marks; mediaeval villages, pantiled roofs; ultramarine skies....fishermen crouched mending nets; images seen and felt, evoking a spirit of place."

In the catalogue for an exhibition of her Mediterranean paintings titled "Sunshine in Winter" in Nottingham in January 1997, Arnfield wrote: "Vines doted in rows across spring landscapes; distant mountains, poppies, stark, clustered among ochre grasses; Cypress trees forming punctuation marks; medieval villages, pantiled roofs; ultramarine skies, dazzling light; harbours, fishing boats, indigo water, excitement, pavement cafes' boule players, fishermen crouched mending nets; images seen and felt, evoking a spirit of place.... all this provides me with the inspiration required to bring to a Nottingham Winter a real breath of sunshine and warmth."

Arnfield's "well-developed sense of place and sympathetic observation of people" were highlighted in the catalogue of an exhibition of her work, People and Places, at Kirkbride Gallery, Peebles, Scotland in September 1998. She spent many years teaching art to adults and schoolchildren in England and Scotland. She also took adults on painting holidays to France and the Greek islands. Because she was disabled due to rheumatoid arthritis, her husband Ron assisted her over the years with her exhibitions and teaching.

Sheila Smith, a British poet, included two poems she had written about Arnfield in "Woman Surprised by a Young Boy," a collection of poems by Smith which was published in July 2010 by Shoestring Press (http://www.shoestring-press.com/2010/06/woman-surprised-by-a-young-boy/). The first poem, "Silence is Very Loud", refers to a visit Smith made to Arnfield's new studio after Arnfield's death, and to her old studio. The second, "Death of a Painter, for Marjorie" talks about Arnfield's unique vision, her ability to see in a landscape something that no one else could see. The title of the collection, "Woman Surprised by a Young Boy," refers to a painting by the English artist Eileen Cooper.

== Awards ==
She was awarded the MBE in 2000, the year before her death, for her "services to art". In 2002–03, Ron Arnfield commissioned a professional photographer to scan much of her work, including her sketchbooks. A CD-ROM, Marjorie Arnfield, A Digital Library, was also produced.

== Death ==
She died on 26 April 2001 in Nottingham, aged 70. In keeping with her Christian faith, her funeral service took place at Southwell Minster, Nottinghamshire. She was survived by her son Robin and her husband, Ron (who died in 2006).

Her other son Nick Arnfield displayed distinct talent as an artist. Nick studied Architecture and Art History at King's College, Cambridge and then became an art teacher. While at Cambridge, Nick reorganised the King's College student art group and held weekly art classes at King's art room. He was also the King's student representative at Kettles Yard and exhibited his own work at King's. Tragically, Nick died in 1999, but had already created a body of work. A posthumous exhibition of Nick's work was held at the St Ives Tate Gallery and at King's College, Cambridge in 2000. Two examples of Nick's paintings can be seen on the Art UK website: https://artuk.org/discover/artists/arnfield-nick-19611999

== Assessment ==
Of her commemorative exhibition at the University of Nottingham in July 2001, a review in The Times by Amber Cowan said it was among the five best one-person art exhibitions in the UK that month: "As a student in Sunderland in the Fifties, Arnfield made a series of oil sketches of miners gathering sea coal along the beach and tending their allotments. 30 years later, her bleak, desolate paintings of Nottinghamshire's doomed coalfields garnered her a reputation as one of the area's finest and most politically aware figurative painters. This retrospective also includes peaceful harbour scenes and hot Provencal landscapes painted in her later years."

An article in the June 2001 issue of the Nottingham University Newsletter titled "A Colourful Life" said that Arnfield's "work proved particularly popular in the (English) East Midlands and the North of England. Her paintings of the demise of Nottinghamshire's coalfields in particular struck an emotional chord. Her fascination with the hard existence of mining communities stemmed from her days as a young art student in Sunderland when she made studies of miners gathering sea coal along the beach front and working on their allotments. In more recent years, she drew on archive photography as a source for paintings of working miners, as well as drawing on her own experience of the demolition of well-known local pit-heads and a trip down a Yorkshire pit shaft. Sympathetic yet unsentimental, her paintings and sketches became an important document of a way of life which has now virtually disappeared." The University of Nottingham Newsletter article also said that Arnfield's vibrant landscapes and harbour scenes painted in the South of France, Greece, and Spain drew their inspiration from artists such as Cézanne, van Gogh, Matisse, and Dufy. "Marjorie Arnfield described her palette in these paintings as being made up of 'colours that sing' and the vitality that was the hallmark of so much of her work is also apparent in a series of studies she did on the subject of football.....Her willingness to embrace such radically different subject matter says much about her open-mindedness as both artist and art teacher," the article said.

Of an exhibition by Arnfield at the Mowbray Gallery in Sunderland in October 1964, a review in The Guardian stated: "Apart from a series of broad, fell country watercolours held together by a lyrical and febrile line, Arnfield, with a brief, decorous and decorative look in gouache and oil at industry in Whitehaven and Tee-side, seems most readily at home when, in pen and wash, she follows in the tradition of Raoul Dufy and John Paddy Carstairs." The review also described Arnfield as a "realist painter with an obvious appeal."

Speaking of Arnfield's English Lake District painting Hodbarrow Iron Mines and Collapsed Seawall, Babette Decker wrote that the "... work of Marjorie Arnfield was one of the most exciting discoveries for my book – an artist who opened one's eyes to the beauty of subjects one might otherwise dismiss as ugly".

Marjorie Arnfield, A Celebration of her Life and Work, which was published by Nottingham University's Djanogly Art Gallery after her death in 2001, described her pictures as "embodying a spirit of vitality, optimism and sheer 'aliveness to it all'". She also left many sketchbooks and diaries which combined extensive comments on her travels with illustrations of what she saw. In December 2009, the Durham County Local History Society featured a life of Marjorie Arnfield in Volume 6 of the Society's Durham Biographies.

In October 1958, one of Arnfield's paintings, Landscape, County Durham, was selected for the Northern Young Artists exhibition that took place in October–November 1958 at the Graves Art Gallery, Sheffield. The Manchester artist L.S. Lowry was honorary president of the Northern Young Artists at that time, and was one of three people on the selection board that chose Arnfield's painting. In its catalogue for the 1965 summer exhibition of Arnfield's Lake District paintings, the Netherhall Centre in Maryport, Cumbria, spoke of Arnfield's "appreciation of Cumbria's beauty and her up-to-date impressions of the industrial and social scene," which included a painting of the atomic power station at Sellafield.

In the introduction to the catalogue for "Marjorie Arnfield at Sixty, Paintings 1945–90", an exhibition at the University of Nottingham Adult Education Centre in November 1990, Arnfield wrote:

"Though coming from a family of North Eastern architects, there was no particular encouragement for my painting at school until the age of 13 when I won the Art Prize. This proved a turning point in reinforcing my determination to go to Art School."

Arnfield explained that at Art School the students painted the immediate environment, the Industrial Landscape of the North. "A fascination with the dramatic quality of some of Man's creations – slag heaps, factories, etc. – evolved into an interest of the interaction of those with Nature in which the latter always seems to come off best."

This interest in industrial landscapes culminated in Arnfield's powerful coal mining paintings.

In his foreword to the catalogue for Arnfield's May–July 1998 exhibition at the National Coal Mining Museum for England, Nicholas Alfrey of Nottingham University's Department of Art History, wrote: "Marjorie Arnfield never blackens her (coal mining) pictures. She records the pride, resilience, and vitality of mining communities in forceful strokes and vivid colours...there is nothing dour nor defeatist about her art."

== Coal mining ==
In the early 1990s Arnfield was deeply affected by the demise of the British coal industry, following the government's decision to privatise British Coal, operator of the UK's coal mines. Having heard on the radio in the early 1990s that the then-British Coal was in the process of decommissioning coal mines prior to being shut down, she was shocked. She decided to capture through her art something of the power and history of the mining industry and workforce, which for many generations had been a major contributor to the British economy.

In Marjorie Arnfield: Artist's Statement, a document produced for an exhibition at Bishop Auckland Town Hall in 1999, Arnfield wrote that, prior to commencing her mining paintings, she turned to the writings of D. H. Lawrence, some of whose novels had been strongly influenced by the East Midlands coal mines. "The disappearance of the pits that Lawrence knew (following the demise of the British coal mining industry) led me to explore the use of archival photographs as a source material for my paintings of miners at work", Arnfield wrote.

In 1994, British Coal sponsored Arnfield's exhibition A Tribute to Coal Mining in Nottinghamshire at Nottingham University's Djanogly Art Gallery. She then held a further 20 exhibitions of her mining art under the title "Images of Coal" at museums and art galleries across the UK. In her mining paintings, Marjorie Arnfield focused on historical mining methods, social aspects of mining communities, and the demolition of the pits. Her mining paintings were purchased by private collections, museums and art galleries. Opening an exhibition of Arnfield's coal mining art at Woodhorn Colliery Museum, journalist Kate Adie said "It is only through Marjorie's images that young people of future generations will learn about this once-great industry [of coal-mining]." At an exhibition of her work in Sunderland in 1997, Arnfield commented, "Pitheads, coal-blackened miners returning home, men scavenging for sea coal on beaches remain as vivid memories from my childhood and art school days in the North-East."

In a 1996 pamphlet titled "Images of Coal", Arnfield wrote: "(These memories) were re-invoked on coming to live in Nottinghamshire in the 1970s, but the dramatic privatisation and pit closure programme added urgency to my work. In 1994, British Coal supported my wish to pay tribute to the men who had laboured dangerously for over a century and record for future generations some of the mines under threat of demolition."

According to The Artists of Northumbria, Arnfield was one of the few British women artists to show a particular interest in the theme of coal mining. Kate Adie wrote in "Images of Coal," "Pit scenes were not often a subject favoured by artists, but remembered, they come alive as a record of dark, once all-powerful work...I have only admiration for the way in which the coalfield is evoked and celebrated in Marjorie's work."

In Images of Coal, Neil Walker, Keeper of Art at Nottingham Castle Museum, was quoted as saying: "..the figurative works are perhaps some of the most spontaneous...with passages of dashing 'Piper-like' brushwork and dramatic flashes of stained glass colours illuminating inky blackness. The juxtaposition of these images of past toil with the contemporary landscapes, bereft of human acvivity, is a poignant one."

In July 2007, the Public Catalogue Foundation said it would include a photograph of Arnfield's Keep The Pits Open: Protest painting in its Oil Paintings in Public Ownership: West Yorkshire catalogue. The painting itself is held in the National Coal Mining Museum for England in Wakefield, West Yorkshire.

In September 2010, the Woodhorn Museum held a two-month exhibition of mining paintings titled Shafts of Light, which included "Marjorie Arnfield's powerful perspective on the Miner's Strike," a museum press release announced. The bulk of the artwork on show was part of the Gemini Collection owned and administered by Robert McManners and Gillian Wales. McManners and Wales are authors of "Shafts of Light," a book about mining artists which includes Arnfield.

As of September 2017, Woodhorn Museum holds two paintings by Arnfield: 'Woodhorn Colliery Museum, Ashington' (a view of the museum's historic buildings and pit wheels) and 'Walking the Dogs at Woodhorn Colliery Museum' (an unidentified man with three black dogs). Both paintings were displayed by the Museum as part of their Images of Coal exhibition in 1997.

Knowledge is Power, an exhibition about adult education at Nottingham University, included two colliery paintings by Arnfield, Coal Tub and Coal Stall, as well as a video about Arnfield's work teaching art to adults at the university and her mining paintings - scroll down to the films section). The exhibition ran from 27 October 2022 to 12 March 2023 at the Weston Gallery, Lakeside Arts at Nottingham University.

Coinciding with the 40th anniversary of the Miners’ Strike of 1984-85, an exhibition titled The Last Cage Down opened in Bishop Auckland on 3 May 2024 comprising works of art portraying the declining years of the coal mining industry. The exhibition includes two works by Arnfield, "Women Protesting" and "Coal Pickers, Strike 1912".

A review of the exhibition in The Guardian by Mark Brown described "Women Protesting" as "an explosively coloured protest painting by Marjorie Arnfield." A review in The Independent described the painting as "a vibrant painting of women protesting with placards against pit closures in the 1980s". The Financial Times reviewed the Last Cage Down and mentioned Arnfield's "Women Protesting" painting.

A work by Arnfield, Haig Pit, features in the news release for an art exhibition featuring powerful depictions of West Cumbria’s industrial heritage including coal mining at The Beacon Museum, Whitehaven, Cumbria. The exhibition runs from 18 January to 30 March 2025 in the museum’s Light and Dark Gallery.

== Paintings on display ==
Paintings by Arnfield held in public galleries, as given by Art UK (formerly the Public Catalogue Foundation), September 2010:

Title	Date	Collection	Catalogue
Water Gardens, Westhorpe, Southwell	2002	Southwell Town Council	Nottinghamshire
Street Market, Lascala		The University of Nottingham	Nottinghamshire
Bonnieux, Provence, France		Sherwood Forest Hospitals NHS Foundation Trust	Nottinghamshire
Blue Flax		Sherwood Forest Hospitals NHS Foundation Trust	Nottinghamshire
Miners and Dogs		Rotherham Museum & Art Gallery	South Yorkshire
Save Our Pits	c.1995	Rotherham Museum & Art Gallery	South Yorkshire
The last Shift		Nottinghamshire County Teaching Primary Care Trust	Nottinghamshire
Desolation, Pleaseley Colliery, Nottinghamshire		Nottinghamshire County Teaching Primary Care Trust	Nottinghamshire
Rufford Colliery Demolition	c.1993	Nottinghamshire County Teaching Primary Care Trust	Nottinghamshire
Breaking the Coal (c.1920)	c.1993	Nottinghamshire County Teaching Primary Care Trust	Nottinghamshire
Woodhorn Colliery Museum		Northumberland Collections Service	Northumberland, Tees Valley & Tyne and Wear
Keep the Pits Open, Protest		National Coal Mining Museum for England	West Yorkshire
Landscape, County Durham		Mima Middlesbrough Institute of Modern Art	Northumberland, Tees Valley & Tyne and Wear
Conservatory, Backhouse Park, Sunderland, Tyne and Wear	c.1950	Southwell Town Council	Nottinghamshire
Industrial Landscape, Whitehaven		Sunderland Museum and Winter Gardens	Tyne and Wear Museums
Cadaqués, Spain (1)	2000	University of Nottingham	Nottinghamshire
