= Fraud squad (United Kingdom) =

Police department which investigates fraud

A fraud squad is a police department which investigates fraud and other economic crimes, the largest of which in the United Kingdom is run by the City of London Police.

== City of London Police ==
This unit is responsible for policing London's and the UK's main financial hub, as part of the City of London Police Economic Crime Department (ECD) It investigates what could be described as traditional fraud offences such as banking frauds; insurance frauds; investment frauds; insider dealing frauds; advance fee frauds and Internet frauds, amongst others. Each team is headed by a Detective Inspector who take it in turn on a weekly basis to act as the "Duty Squad" and they form the immediate response to any calls received concerning new fraud cases.

The Fraud Squad is a specialist area, usually a part of the Specialist Investigation Department, where officers are normally transferred from general detective duties with the Criminal Investigations Department (CID). Some officers will be nominated to work on specific cases for the Serious Fraud Office (SFO), they will also provide assistance and advice on policing matters to the SFO and Financial Services Authority.

The City of London Police has recruited accountancy specialists directly into its Special Constabulary, and these officers primary duties are assisting in complex fraud investigations.

== Economic Crime Department (ECD) ==
The Fraud Squad is part of the City of London Police Economic Crime Department (ECD) which also consists of:

- Cheque and Credit Card Unit
- Money Laundering Investigation Unit
- Financial Investigation Unit
- Dedicated Cheque and Plastic Crime Unit
- Fraud Desk
- Financial Intelligence Development Team

== Ministry of Defence Police ==
The Ministry of Defence Police (MDP) also maintains a sizeable Fraud squad known as the Fraud Defence. This squad investigates serious fraud and corruption offences against the Ministry of Defence. Because of the scale of the MoD's annual budget, even a very small percentage lost to criminal activity has the potential to be a considerable sum. It also operates the 'Confidential Hotline', where fraud can be reported

The MDP's Fraud Squad works with procurement officers and the MoD Defence Fraud Analysis Unit (DFAU) in delivering fraud awareness and prevention advice across the MoD. The MDP Fraud Squad is one of only four in the UK accredited to deliver this nationally accredited fraud training for the MDP, Home Office Forces and Service Police.

== Isle of Man Financial Crime Unit ==
The Financial Crime Unit is a multi-agency unit, consisting of Police and Customs Officers, Police Support Staff and other Government Departments such as Internal Audit and HM Attorney General’s Chambers.

The FCU's remit covers:

- prevention of financial crime
- detection of financial crime
- investigation:
  - serious financial crime
  - money laundering
  - terrorism financing

The unit is made up of three teams:

- The Financial Intelligence Team which receives Suspicious Activity Reports which are submitted by the financial sector
- The Overseas Assistance Team which deals with all International Letters of Request or other assistance procedures provided for through Mutual Legal Assistance Treaties
- The Investigations Team which deals with all investigations

== Other fraud investigators ==
=== Department for Work and Pensions ===
In the year 2004-2005 benefit thieves stole around £900 million.

The DWP targets benefits fraud and benefit theft, which includes:

- non notification of that claimant is now living with a partner
- non notification of that claimant is receiving other benefits
- non notification by the claimant of savings or not declaring the right amount
- claiming for children who have left home
- non notification of that claimant has started work, or about any earnings
- non notification of that claimant has inherited money
- non notification of that claimant is going abroad, living abroad, or has changed address.

=== NHS Counter Fraud Authority (NHSCFA) ===
The National Health Service Counter Fraud Authority is a special health authority charged with identifying, investigating and preventing fraud and other economic crime within the NHS and the wider health group. https://cfa.nhs.uk/

Formed on 1 November 2017 under section 28 of the National Health Service Act 2006. It replaces its predecessor NHS Protect, which was part of the NHS Business Services Authority.

=== Other bodies ===
- Driver and Vehicle Licensing Agency (DVLA)
- Financial Services Authority (FSA)
- UK Visas and Immigration (Home Office)
- Her Majesty's Revenue and Customs (HMRC)
- Local Authority Investigation Officers Group (LAIOG)
- National Anti Fraud Network (NAFN)
- Royal Mail Security Service (Post Office Investigation Department - POID)
- Identity and Passport Service (IPS) UK Passport Authority
- Universities & Colleges Admission Service (UCAS)
- Serious Organised Crime Agency (SOCA)
- National Economic Crime Bureau (GNECB) – Republic of Ireland
