= Fowzi Badavi Nejad =

Iranian terrorist

Fowzi Badavi Nejad فوزي بدوي نجاد
- Born: Ahvaz, Iran
- Known for: Iranian embassy siege
- Status: Released on licence since 2008
- Criminal charge: Conspiracy to murder, false imprisonment and possessing firearms with intent
- Penalty: Life imprisonment with a 25-year minimum term
- Wanted by: Iran
- Wanted since: 1980

Fowzi Badavi Nejad (Arabic: فوزي بدوي نجاد; Persian: فوزی بداوی نژاد) is an Iranian terrorist who was the only survivor of a six-person group of the Democratic Revolutionary Front for the Liberation of Arabistan (DRFLA) that seized the Iranian Embassy for six days in London in 1980. Two hostages were shot dead by the group, and the siege was ended when the British Army's elite Special Air Service (SAS) killed the other terrorists. Nejad was sentenced to life imprisonment nine months later.

== Biography ==
He was born in the Iranian province of Khūzestān, home to most of Iran's Arab population which had suffered marginalisation and persecution under the regime of the Shah and subsequently that of the Islamic Republic of Iran. His father died when he was young. He became an Iranian Army soldier aged 18 for two years' national service before employment as a labourer in the city of Khorramshahr's docks. He witnessed the massacre of protesting Khūzestān Arabs on 30 May 1979 (known locally as "Black Wednesday") by the Iranian Revolutionary Guards. To avoid becoming part of the Arabs' round-up by the Revolutionary Guards, Nejad went to the Iraqi border and asked the police for asylum. As he was well-educated and bilingual in Arabic and Persian, he was taken to Basra, given a home and employed by Iraqi intelligence translating Iranian radio broadcasts. Said Hadi, Sheik of Shalamcheh introduced himself as the chief of the political movement of Ahwazi Arabs (the largest Arab community of Khūzestān). He told Nejad that he was now under a death-sentence in Iran and encouraged him to take part in an operation in London.

== Siege and preparations ==
Nejad agreed, the 22-year-old arriving in London at the beginning of 1980 on the pretext of requiring medical treatment. He and the five other members of the team were put up in a block of flats and given money to spend; the young Iraqi caretaker of the flats was told they were language students. After a few weeks, other residents complained about their raucous behaviour and they were asked to leave. They moved to another London flat in Lexham Gardens, South Kensington owned by a Jordanian. They toned down their behaviour and received visits from more-senior DRFLA members for training and support. During April, they reconnoitred the Iranian Embassy in pairs or threes. On 29 April, they received final instructions and distributed the weapons. Nejad, now using the alias "Ali", received a 9mm Browning pistol.

The group took control of the embassy on the morning of 30 April. During the takeover, Nejad was regarded by Metropolitan Police Diplomatic Protection Group Constable Trevor Lock (also a hostage) with particular negativity, saying he could not "connect with him," adding that Nejad had fired his pistol over the head of Gholam Ali Afrouz, the chargé d'affaires, to amuse himself. On 5 May at 13:45, Abbas Lavasani, the Embassy's chief press officer, was shot dead by the group's leader, Salim Towfigh (real name Oan Ali Mohammed), and his body was dumped outside. At 19:23, when the SAS stormed the Embassy, Ahmad Dadgar, the embassy's medical clerk, heard a shout to the other terrorists, "They attacked, go to the hostages room and kill everybody," and saw Nejad and two others enter but turned his back to the terrorists and did not know who then fired the bullets which critically injured him; the gunfire left PhD student Ali Samadzadeh dead, the second and final hostage to die before the SAS killed the five other terrorists.

Nejad hid amongst the hostages as they were led out by the SAS, but was immediately singled out as a terrorist by BBC sound-recordist Sim Harris. Robin Horsfall of the SAS separated him from the hostages. He was led away by another soldier, but Horsfall, aware of the change of situation, told his colleague to "put him down", i.e. to kill him. Later, it was reported that some hostages intervened to stop him from being killed; inside they had persuaded some other terrorists to drop their weapons and surrender before they were then pointed out by hostages and shot by the soldiers.

On 14 January 1981, Nejad appeared at the Old Bailey in London charged with murder, conspiracy to murder, false imprisonment and possessing firearms with intent. He pleaded not guilty to murder of the two hostages but admitted the other charges. Under interrogation prior to his court appearance, he said that the plan was hatched with the guidance of the Iraqi authorities and that he was told that British police did not carry weapons (PC Lock, who had been inadequately searched, was armed throughout the siege). It was alleged during the trial by the doorman, Abbas Fellahi, that Nejad had been one of four gunmen who panicked and opened fire on the hostages when the SAS arrived. Dadgar explained how he had tried in vain to shield his friend Samadzadeh from the hail of bullets. Nejad claimed in his testimony that the original plan was to begin shooting hostages if their demands were not met within a day; he said there had been a split amongst the gunmen after the leader, Towfigh, would not relate the conversation he had with the police outside. Nejad said that he'd refused to shoot a hostage when directed and was told by Towfigh that he would be shot as a result.

== Imprisonment and release ==
Nejad was convicted of conspiracy to murder, false imprisonment and possessing firearms with intent and sentenced to life imprisonment with a 25-year minimum term at HMP Wellingborough. In prison he was called "Fozzy" and was regarded as gentle and quiet. He wrote to some of his victims who spoke Arabic to apologise. As the years passed, the feelings of some of those involved in the siege about his incarceration changed or were made known. In 2000, his lawyers submitted new evidence: hostages interviewed for a documentary said he had prevented more deaths, and lawyers added that, having been duped by Iraqi intelligence and unaware of the true purpose and outcome of the siege, with a false promise that the Jordanian ambassador would get involved before any bloodshed, he went along with it for his and his family's safety after receiving threats. The Lord Chief Justice recommended to Home Secretary David Blunkett that the 25-year minimum term be reduced. Blunkett ignored the recommendation. The Court of Appeal criticised Blunkett and quashed his decision not to reduce the term. In 2005, the BBC's Harris said he thought he should be released and this view was supported by Horsfall, who said he had "done his time." Because of procedural problems, it was two years before Nejad was moved to an open prison and then, because of a security concern due to a large number of absconding prisoners, was returned to a closed prison to wait longer before release.

The UK Government stated that as Nejad is a foreign convicted terrorist he is unable to apply for asylum but could not be deported under human-rights law: the Iranian authorities continue to want to try Nejad separately for the murder of the two hostages but were unable to offer acceptable assurances to the British that he would not be tortured or executed upon repatriation; during his trial they had said he should receive "Islamic justice". Also, there is now a Shia-majority government in Iraq with closer relations with its Shia-cleric-led neighbour and no third country was willing to accept him.

He was freed from HM Prison Ford in October 2008 after 27 years in prison and allowed to remain in the UK. On 12 October, Iran's deputy foreign minister, Mehdi Safari, summoned the British ambassador, Geoffrey Adams, to protest against this "condemnable and indefensible" act. PC Lock wrote to the UK Government protesting his release. Despite suffering life-threatening injuries, medical clerk Dadgar said he had forgiven him and signed a release petition with other hostages, commenting, "He has been punished. Fair enough." He added that if returned to Iran they would "shoot him as soon as he got off the plane." Nejad lives in south London with a new identity.
