= John McAleese =

British SAS soldier (1949–2011)

- Born: 25 April 1949; Stirling, Scotland
- Died: 26 August 2011 (aged 62); Thessaloniki, Greece
- Military career
- Allegiance: United Kingdom
- Branch: British Army
- Service years: 1969–1992
- Rank: Staff Sergeant
- Nickname: Mac
- Units: Royal Engineers; 22 SAS
- Conflicts: Operation Nimrod; Falklands War; Operation Banner
- Awards: Military Medal

John Thomas "Mac" McAleese, MM (25 April 1949 – 26 August 2011) was a Scottish soldier who took part in several late 20th century conflicts with the British Army's Royal Engineers and the Special Air Service. During his time in the Special Air Service, he notably had a role in the storming of the Iranian Embassy in London during a hostage-taking siege in May 1980.

== Early life ==
McAleese was born in Stirling, Scotland, on 25 April 1949 and grew up in Laurieston, Falkirk.

== Military career ==
He joined the Royal Engineers in 1969, aged 20, and in 1973 passed the All Arms Commando Course (AACC), which earned him the green beret and a transfer to 59 Independent Commando, Royal Engineers.

In 1975 he transferred into the Special Air Service. He was a lance corporal in 1980, serving in Pagoda Troop, "B" Squadron, 22 SAS Regiment, when he led "Blue Team" in the storming of the Iranian Embassy in London during a hostage siege on 5 May 1980. McAleese fought in the Falklands War in 1982, and in The Troubles. He was awarded the Military Medal for gallantry in action at the Loughgall ambush in County Armagh on 8 May 1987, and was present at the Drumnakilly ambush in County Tyrone in August 1988. He also served as a bodyguard for three Prime Ministers of the United Kingdom. He was discharged from the British Army on 8 February 1992 with the rank of staff sergeant.

== Post-military life ==
After leaving the British Army, McAleese worked for a short while as the landlord of a Hereford public house, was employed as a security contractor in conflicts in Iraq and Afghanistan, and became an adviser and interviewee on several British television programmes examining the working practices of British Special Forces soldiering. He sold his British Army service medals for an undisclosed sum to the Lord Ashcroft Collection. He appeared in the BBC-produced television documentary series SAS Survival Secrets (2003), detailing the organizational structure of the Special Air Service Regiment and the nature of the military and security roles in which it is used. He also found employment in the corporate sphere of airsoft gaming, and as a spokesman for the corporate development of the martial art "Goshinkwai". He was the co-founder and first director for training and operations of private security company NNK Special Services Group (NNK Group) until his death.

== Personal life ==
McAleese married twice. On 20 August 2009, his elder son, Serjeant Paul McAleese of 2nd Battalion The Rifles, was killed on active service in Afghanistan by a roadside bomb during a foot patrol in Helmand Province.

Four days after his son's funeral, John McAleese was arrested by officers from West Mercia Police over an allegation of accessing child pornography on the internet via his home computer. He had first been contacted by the British police in relation to the matter in 2007 while at his home in Greece, and had told them he would attend a British police station to assist with their enquiries when he was next back in the United Kingdom. After his son's funeral, he had voluntarily attended a police interview, during which he had been cautioned, placed under arrest and bailed pending further enquiries, after which he returned to his residence in Greece. On a failure to attend the next bail appointment in the UK, McAleese was contacted by West Mercia Police at his home in Greece, whereupon he refused to return to England to attend the bail hearing. In March 2010, West Mercia Police applied for a European Arrest Warrant for McAleese at Hereford Magistrates' Court, which was granted, and in November 2010 the British Government formally requested McAleese's arrest by the Greek Government and extradition from its territory back to the United Kingdom. The matter was still legally ongoing at the time of McAleese's death.

== Death ==
McAleese died on 26 August 2011 of a heart attack in his sleep at the age of 62 in Thessaloniki, Greece, where he was living. His funeral was held at Hereford Cathedral. He was survived by his second wife, a daughter by his first marriage, and step-child and son by his second marriage. His second wife died by suicide in November 2018.
