= Kate Adie =

British journalist (born 1945)

Kate Adie CBE DL
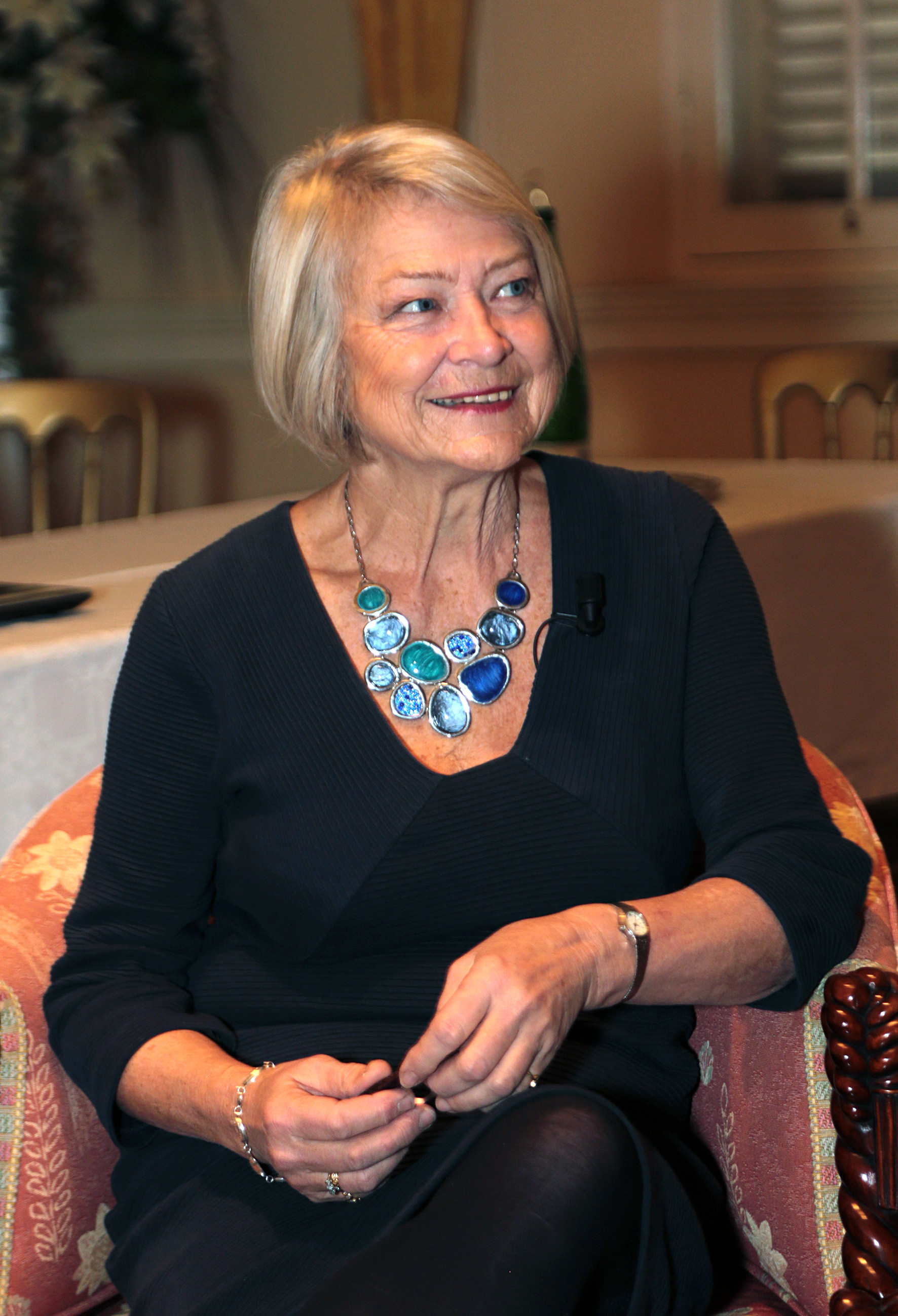
- Adie at the Gibraltar International Literary Festival in 2017
- Born: Kathryn Adie; 19 September 1945 (age 80); Whitley Bay, Northumberland, England
- Education: Sunderland Church High School; University of Newcastle upon Tyne (BA)
- Occupation: Journalist
- Notable credit: Chief News Correspondent for BBC News
- Awards: Richard Dimbleby Award (1990); Fellowship Award (2018)
- Kate Adie's voice from the BBC programme From Our Own Correspondent, 29 August 2009.

Kathryn Adie CBE DL (born 19 September 1945) is an English journalist. She was Chief News Correspondent for BBC News between 1989 and 2003, during which time she reported from war zones around the world.

She retired from the BBC in early 2003 and works as a freelance presenter with From Our Own Correspondent on BBC Radio 4.

== Early life ==
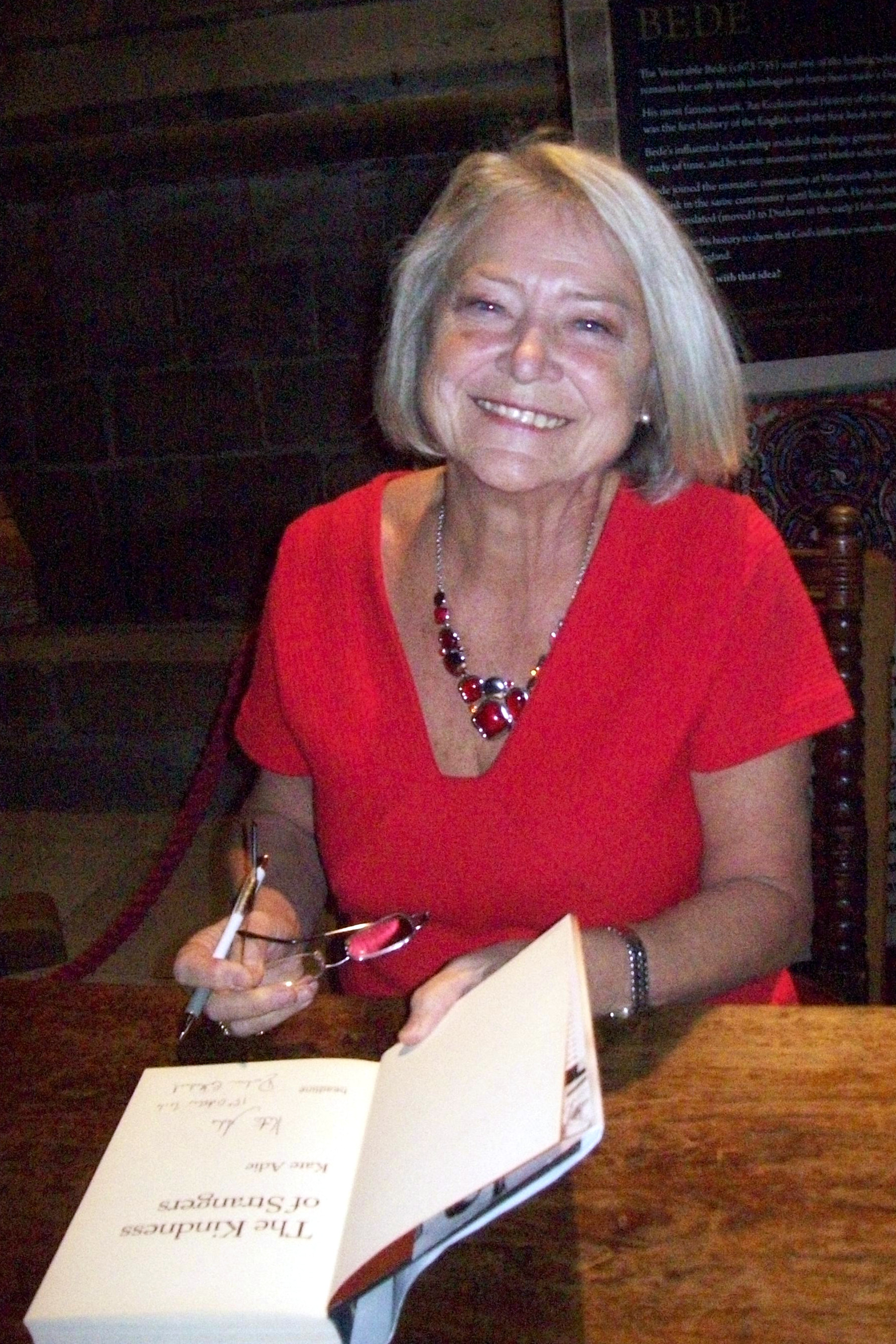
Adie in 2014

Adie was born in Whitley Bay, Northumberland. She was adopted as a baby by a Sunderland pharmacist and his wife, John and Maud Adie, and grew up there. Her birth parents were Irish Catholics and she made contact with her birth family in 1993, establishing a loving relationship lasting more than 20 years with her birth mother "Babe" Dunnet. Adie failed to trace her birth father John Kelly, or his family from Waterford, despite public appeals, and she knows only that he had a brother (her blood uncle) Michael.

She had an independent school education at Sunderland Church High School, and in 1963–1964 travelled to Berlin, including the Soviet Sector of East Berlin, to complete a German-language course. She obtained her degree at the University of Newcastle upon Tyne, in Swedish and Icelandic studies. At university, she got to know the BBC presenter Marian Foster, who was president of the Gilbert and Sullivan society, in which Adie performed several times.

During her third year at Newcastle, she also taught English in sub-arctic northern Sweden.

== Career ==
=== Radio ===
Adie's career with the BBC began, after graduation, as a station assistant at BBC Radio Durham. From 1971 to 1975, she was at Radio Bristol, where she presented Womanwise on Fridays at 11am.

=== Television ===
By 1977, she was a BBC South news reporter based in Plymouth and Southampton, before her move to BBC national television news in 1979. She was the duty reporter one evening in May 1980 and first on the scene when the Special Air Service (SAS) went in to break up the Iranian Embassy siege. As smoke bombs exploded in the background and SAS soldiers abseiled in to rescue the hostages, Adie reported live and unscripted to one of the largest news audiences ever, while crouched behind a car door. This proved to be her big break. Adie reported extensively for BBC News, including from the north London crime scenes of serial killer Dennis Nilsen, in 1983.

Adie was thereafter regularly dispatched to report on disasters and conflicts throughout the 1980s, including The Troubles in Northern Ireland, the American bombing of Tripoli in 1986 (her reporting of which was criticised by the Conservative Party Chairman Norman Tebbit), and the Lockerbie bombing of 1988. She was promoted to Chief News Correspondent in 1989 and held the role for fourteen years.

One of Adie's most significant assignments was to report the Tiananmen Square protests of 1989. She was reportedly injured after being grazed by a bullet that had "shaved the skin off her arm", as she ran through Tiananmen Square at the height of the protests. Nearly thirty years later, she said that she and her team were the only crew out in the square, and so were able to witness "the massacre by the Chinese army of its own citizens in Beijing in 1989", which had never been acknowledged by the government nor reported in China. She said, "... at least we were there and we have the evidence of what they did. They would love to erase it from history". Adie famously had a public disagreement with fellow British journalist John Simpson, who reportedly had accused her of falsifying her reports on Tiananmen Square.

Major assignments followed in the Gulf War, the war in the former Socialist Federal Republic of Yugoslavia, the 1994 Rwandan genocide and the war in Sierra Leone in 2000. Her trademark assignment look became flak jacket and pearl earrings.

In Libya, she met leader Colonel Muammar Gaddafi. She was also shot by a drunk and irate Libyan army commander after refusing, as a journalist, to act as an intermediary between the British and Libyan governments; the bullet, fired at point-blank range, nicked her collar bone but she did not suffer permanent harm.

While she was in Yugoslavia, her leg was injured in Bosnia and she met Bosnian Serb leader Radovan Karadžić.

A newspaper cartoon features two soldiers, one with a tattered flag "To Iraq" on the barrel of his machine gun, and the caption: "We can't start yet... Kate Adie isn't here." Her insistence upon being on the spot elicited the wry adage that "a good decision is getting on a plane at an airport where Kate Adie is getting off".

In 2003, Adie retired from the BBC, where she had been Chief News Correspondent. She subsequently worked as a freelance journalist, where among other work she gives regular reports on Radio New Zealand, as a public speaker, as well as participating in many of the 500 iPlayer episodes of From Our Own Correspondent on BBC Radio 4. She hosted two five-part series of Found, a Leopard Films production for BBC One, in 2005 and 2006. The series considered the life experiences of adults affected by adoption and what it must be like to start one's life as a foundling.

In 2017, she was one of the speakers at the Gibraltar International Literary Festival.

After being appointed a Commander of the Order of the British Empire (CBE) in the 2018 Birthday Honours, Adie warned the public that journalism was under attack:

We seem to be living through a time where [sic] there are threats to journalists everywhere, whether it's repression or censorship, and it's hugely important to recognise that the intention of journalism is to tell it as it is and we need to do that more than ever now.

Adie was appointed Chancellor of Bournemouth University on 7 January 2019, succeeding Baron Phillips of Worth Matravers. In her address, she warned postgraduate journalism students that confirming information and verifying news sources was critical in the current climate of fake news. She stressed the importance of personally verifying news sources. "Getting your person there is an absolutely standard lesson... news is not news without verification. ...If you only have the station cat to send, send them!".

== Awards and honours ==
- BAFTA Richard Dimbleby Award (1990)
- OBE (1993 New Year Honours)
- Deputy Lieutenant of Dorset (2013)
- BAFTA Fellowship (2018)
- CBE (2018 Birthday Honours)
- Honorary degrees:
  - York St John University
  - Nottingham Trent University
  - University of Bath (MA,1987)
  - Loughborough University (1991)
  - Honorary Professor of Journalism at the University of Sunderland
  - three Honorary Fellowships including one awarded by Royal Holloway, University of London (1996)
  - Honorary Doctorate of Letters from Plymouth University (2013)

== Legacy ==
In 2005, Adie donated her professional papers, notebooks and artefacts to the University of Sunderland Special Collections. The collection also includes analogue and digital recordings and was fully catalogued in 2025.

== Personal life ==
Adie lives in Cerne Abbas, Dorset.

== Charitable associations ==
In 2017 Adie was appointed as ambassador for SSAFA, the UK’s oldest military charity. Adie is currently also an ambassador for SkillForce and the non-governmental organisation Farm Africa. In July 2018 Adie became an Ambassador for the medical charity Overseas Plastic Surgery Appeal.

Adie is a fan of Sunderland A.F.C. In 2011, she took part in the Sunderland A.F.C. charity Foundation of Light event.

== Works ==
- The Kindness of Strangers. Headline. 2002. ISBN 0-7553-1073-X. - autobiography
- Corsets to Camouflage: Women and War. Coronet. 2003. ISBN 0-340-82060-8.
- Nobody's Child. Hodder & Stoughton. 2005. ISBN 0-340-83800-0.
- Into Danger: People Who Risk Their Lives for Work. Hodder & Stoughton. September 2008. ISBN 978-0-340-93321-3.
- Fighting on the Home Front: The Legacy of Women in World War One. Hodder & Stoughton. September 2013. ISBN 978-1-4447-5967-9.

== In popular culture ==
Adie's role as a BBC television journalist covering the 1980 Iranian Embassy siege in Princes Gate, central London, is included in 6 Days. The role was played by actress Abbie Cornish.

The satirical British puppet TV show Spitting Image depicted Adie as a thrill seeker, giving her the title "BBC Head of Bravery" and featuring her puppet in dangerous situations.

Adie is mentioned in the TV series Gavin & Stacey having a confrontation with Stacey's best friend Nessa. She is also mentioned on the episode 1 of Gimme Gimme Gimme.
