= Matthew Metcalfe =

New Zealand film and documentary producer

Matthew Metcalfe ONZM FRHistS FRGS FRAI
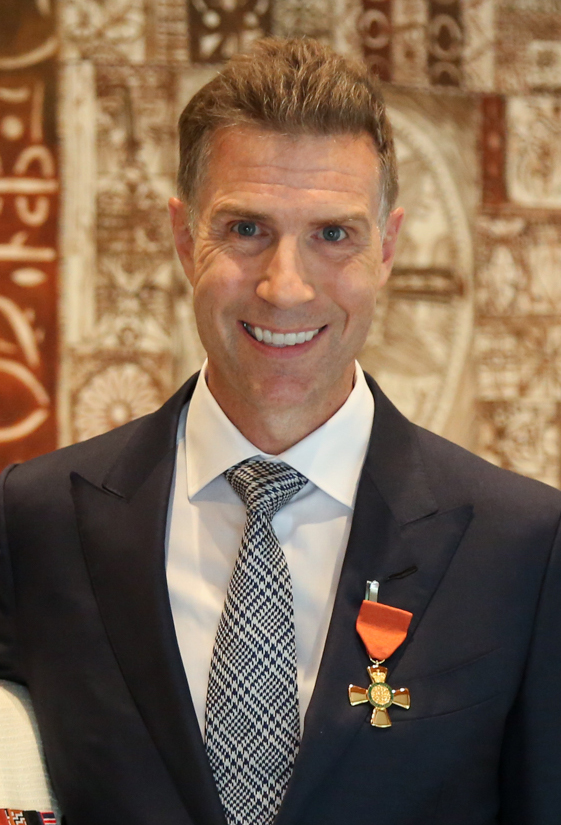
- Metcalfe in 2025
- Born: Matthew Christian Metcalfe; Christchurch, New Zealand
- Education: University of Auckland; University of Oxford
- Occupations: Film producer and writer
- Years active: 1998–present
- Notable work: The Dead Lands; Dean Spanley; Whina
- Spouse: Elizabeth Metcalfe
- Relatives: Di McCarthy (stepmother)

Matthew Christian Metcalfe ONZM is a New Zealand film producer and screenwriter known for his biographical and documentary films. He has also produced comedies and drama films, as well as being involved in several television series. In December 2024, Metcalfe was appointed an Officer of the New Zealand Order of Merit for services to the film industry.

In the early 2000s, Metcalfe worked as a music producer before moving into film and television. He produced several short films, before producing feature films and television series. Notable films he has produced include Dean Spanley (2008), The Dead Lands (2014), Beyond The Edge (2013), Whina (2022), McLaren (2017), Mothers of the Revolution (2021) The Subtle Art of Not Giving a F*ck (2023) and The Lie (2024).

== Early life and education ==
Metcalfe was born in Christchurch, New Zealand. His family moved to Papua New Guinea to then Canberra, Australia, when Metcalfe was a child.

He did military service in Australia and New Zealand. He completed a Bachelor of Commerce Degree at Auckland University, and later the University of Oxford, England, where he received an Advanced Diploma in English History. He was interested in film during his student days.

== Career ==
=== 1998–2003: music videos and short films ===
Metcalfe worked as a music video producer in the early 2000s, with Shihad, Hayley Westenra and Che Fu. Metcalfe's first credit as a producer was for the 1999 short film, 9 Across. He was involved with the script writer, Jesse Warn who was promised to getting 9 Across on-screen. 9 Across won the script writer an award for Best Contribution to a Short at the 1999 NZ Film and TV Awards.

During the early 2000s Metcalfe started working on more short films and music videos. Working in between jobs as a waiter, shelf stacker and cinema usher. At one point he went into the New Zealand Radio station, bFM and offered to make a music video for any band with a budget of $1,000. He then went on to produce music videos for Shihad and Hayley Westenra. In 2001 he produced the Tui-Award-winning music video for Che Fu's Fade Away.

=== 2003–2007: early films ===
Metcalfe teamed up again with film writer Jesse Warn to work on more projects. They worked further on with a TV series about the New Zealand band, Steriogram. He teamed up with Warn again to produce the 2003 film Nemesis Game. In 2005 he produced the TV series, Air Force which was about the Royal New Zealand Air Force. He then went to focus on a more personal documentary about his own father, Frank, in Vietnam - My Father's War which was released in 2006.

Around this time Metcalfe started to direct documentaries including the 2007 documentary, Soldiers of Fortune. He was also involved in the development of the 2008 feature-length documentary, Relocated Mountains which follows a Kurdish refugee's trip from New Zealand back to Iraq. For both of these films, Metcalfe spent time in Baghdad, Iraq. Metcalfe has noted that during the filming, him and the film crew were being secretly filmed by a kidnap squad.

=== 2007–2013: documentary film breakthrough ===
In 2007, a film that Metcalfe produced, The Ferryman was released. At this point he began working with producer Alan Harris with Dean Spanley which was released in 2008.

Metcalfe went on to produce a further four features with Toa Fraser, including, Giselle, The Dead Lands and the films, 6 Days and The Free Man. He also produced the romantic comedy, Love Birds that was released in 2011. In 2013 he produced the documentary, Beyond The Edge. Metcalfe also portrayed the English mountaineer and author Wilfrid Noyce in the film.

=== 2013–2020: further feature films ===
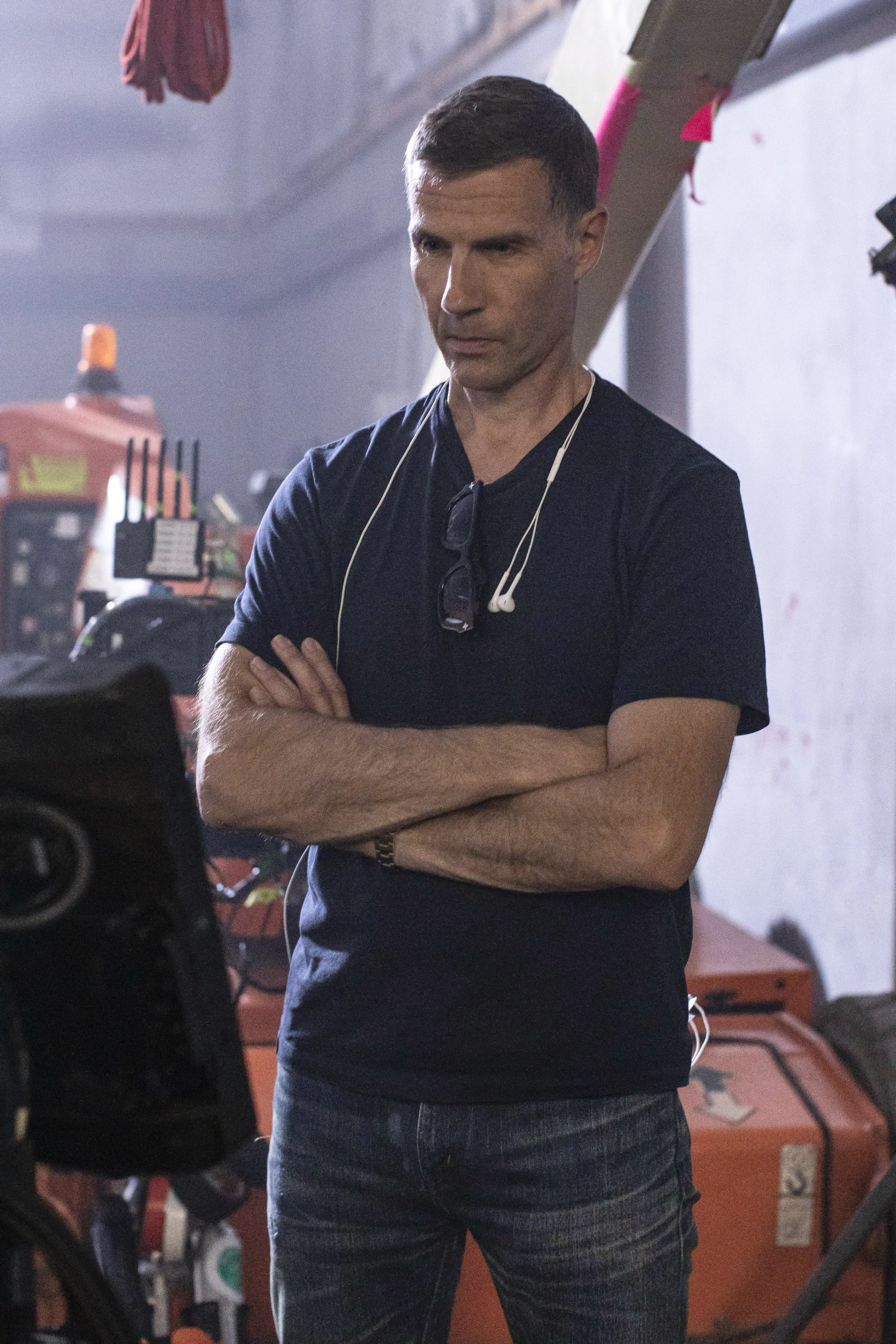
Metcalfe in 2021

Metcalfe then worked with New Zealand producer Fraser Brown to work on more documentaries such as, McLaren, Born Racer - The Scott Dixon Story and Wayne. In 2020 Metcalfe produced the documentary, Dawn Raid. In 2021, Metcalfe produced Mothers of the Revolution which follows the story of the Greenham Common Women's Peace Camp protests. In 2022 the film was nominated for the Envy Best Single Documentary award at The Grierson Trust. Dawn Raid was also nominated in 2022 by The Grierson Trust for the Sky Documentaries Best Music Documentary award.

=== 2020–2024: Whina, The Subtle Art of Not Giving a F*ck and Billion Dollar Heist ===
In 2022 Metcalfe was one of the producers for the biographical film about the life of Dame Whina Cooper, Whina.

In 2023 a documentary film based on the book by Mark Manson, The Subtle Art of Not Giving a F*ck was released. Metcalfe served as one of the writers and producers. Metcalfe served as one of the producers for the horror mystery film The Tank, which was released late April 2023. In July 2023 Billion Dollar Heist held its first public screening as part of the 2023 New Zealand International Film Festival.

=== 2024-present: Never Look Away, The Lie, A Mistake ===
For the 2024 Sundance Film Festival, the film Never Look Away was premiered. Metcalfe was a co-writer, with director Lucy Lawless, for the film, as well as a producer. The film is a feature-length documentary of New Zealand-born CNN photojournalist Margaret Moth. The film was directed by Lucy Lawless.

In 2024, The Lie was released, which follows the story of Grace Millane, a British tourist who went missing and was later found dead in 2018. A Mistake was released in June 2024 which was produced by Metcalfe, a medical-drama film which was directed by Christine Jeffs and based on the novel of the same name by Carl Shuker. The film had its world premiere at Tribeca Festival on 7 June 2024. Ash, which was released by Metcalfe was released in March 2025.

=== 2026-present: Moss & Freud and upcoming films ===
Moss & Freud premiered at the BFI London Film Festival on 10 October 2025. It was later released in cinemas in the United Kingdom on 29 May 2026.

== Recognition and awards ==
Metcalfe is a Fellow of the Royal Historical Society and the Royal Geographical Society

In 2002, Metcalfe won a Tui Award for best music video. This was for Che Fu's, Fade Away video that was released the same year.

In his film career, Metcalfe has received several accolades. His film Nemesis Game (2003) was nominated for an award at the Qantas Film and Television Awards.

In 2009, Dean Spanley won the award for Best Feature at the 2009 Qantas Film and Television Awards. This award was shared with co-producer Alan Harris.

In 2013, Metcalfe was awarded Independent Producer of the Year at the SPADA Screen Industry Awards.

Also in 2013, Metcalfe was included in the nomination for Beyond the Edge for Best Documentary at the 2013 Rialto Channel New Zealand Film Awards.

In the 2025 New Year Honours, Metcalfe was appointed an Officer of the New Zealand Order of Merit for services to the film industry.

== Filmography ==
=== Feature films ===
Year	Title	Writer	Producer	Notes
2003	Nemesis Game	No	Yes	
2007	The Ferryman	Yes	Yes	
2008	Dean Spanley	No	Yes	
2011	Love Birds	No	Yes	Also acted in the film as the Waiter
2013	Giselle	No	Yes	
2013	Beyond the Edge	Yes	Yes	Also portrayed the role as Wilfrid Noyce in the film
2014	The Dead Lands	No	Yes	
2015	Atomic Falafel	No	Yes	
2015	25 April	Yes	Yes	
2016	The Free Man	Yes	Yes	
2017	McLaren	Yes	Yes	
2017	6 Days	No	Yes	
2018	Wayne	Yes	Yes	
2018	Born Racer	Yes	Yes	
2019	Capital in the 21st Century	Yes	Yes	
2020	We Need to Talk About A.I	No	Yes	
2021	Dawn Raid	Yes	Yes	
	Mothers of the Revolution	Yes	Yes	
2022	Whina	No	Yes	
2023	The Subtle Art of Not Giving a #@%!	Yes	Yes	
	The Tank	No	Yes	
	Billion Dollar Heist	Yes	Yes	
2024	Never Look Away	Yes	Yes	
2024	A Mistake	No	Yes	
2024	The Lie	Yes	Yes	Deals with the Murder of Grace Millane
2025	Ash	No	Yes	
2026	Moss & Freud	No	Yes	

=== Short films ===
Year	Title	Producer
1998	9 Across	Yes
2000	Little Samurai	Yes
2000	Her Iliad	Yes
2004	Picnic Stops	Yes
2005	Auld Lang Syne	Yes
2005	Nothing Special	Yes
2005	Rest Stop	Yes

=== Television ===
Year	Title	Producer	Notes
2004	Steriogram - White Trash to Rock Gods	Yes	
2005	Air Force	Yes	
2006	Vietnam - My Father's War	Yes	Also presenter
2007	Soldiers of Fortune	Yes	Also director
2008	Relocated Mountains	Yes	Also writer
2009	Emilie Richards - Das Paradies am Ende der Welt	Yes	
2012	Emilie Richards - Spuren der Vergangenheit	Yes	
2019	The Dead Lands	No	Executive producer
2022	Reunited	No	Executive producer and writer
