= Beyond the Edge =

Beyond the Edge may refer to:

- Beyond the Edge (2013 film), a 2013 New Zealand docudrama
- Beyond the Edge (2016 film), a 2016 American science-fiction film
- Beyond the Edge (2018 film), a 2018 Russian fantasy film
- Beyond the Edge (TV series), a CBS television series
