= The Lie (2024 film) =

The Lie: The Murder of Grace Millane
- Directed by: Helena Coan
- Written by: Tom Blackwell; Helena Coan; Matthew Metcalfe
- Produced by: Matthew Metcalfe; Tom Blackwell; Norman Merry
- Cinematography: Jake Bryant
- Edited by: Chiara Armentano; Andrew Hulme
- Music by: Lauren King
- Production company: GFC Films
- Release date: 25 April 2024
- Running time: 104 minutes
- Country: New Zealand
- Language: English

The Lie: The Murder of Grace Millane is a 92-minute documentary film by British film maker Helena Coan exploring the murder of British tourist Grace Millane in Auckland, New Zealand, in 2018. It called consensual rough-sex defence to be banned, hence the title. The film was released in New Zealand cinemas on 25 April 2024.

== Synopsis ==
The Lie uses social media videos, interviews, CCTV footage, police interview tapes and newsreels to recreate a chronology of the events leading to Grace Millane's murder in Auckland, the police investigation and interrogation of Jesse Kempson and the subsequent murder trial. The film begins with social media posts and footage of Millane's overseas travels in South America and New Zealand. The film uses CCTV footage to reconstruct Millane's Tinder date with Kempson and their movements on the night of her murder on 1 December 2018.

The documentary than shifts to police interview tapes of Kempson's interrogation by a male detective as well as local media coverage of Millane's disappearance. During interrogation, Kempson confirms dating Millane but claims that they parted at a crossing near Sky City. He also claims that he slept till 10 am on 2 December 2018. When confronted with photographic evidence of him wheeling a suitcase into his building around 8 am, Kempson later revises his story to claim that Millane died accidentally after the two had "rough sex." Kempson claims he panicked and buried her body in the Waitākere Ranges.

The Lie then moves to Millane's 2019 murder trial where Kempson's defence lawyers use a "rough sex murder defence" strategy, claiming that Millane initiated the sexual intercourse. The documentary also covers evidence that surfaced the trial including Kempson browsing Internet pornography websites following Millane's death, photographing her corpse and going for another Tinder date the day after her death. During the trial, the court also hears testimony from a former girlfriend of Kempson about his violent nature and appetite for rough sex. Kempson is convicted of Millane's murder in December 2019 and sentence to a life sentence with a minimum non-parole period of 17 years.

The documentary also discusses the rough sex defence against the phenomenon of sexual violence against women. A blurb states that Kempson was convicted of eight further charges against a former partner including unlawful sexual connection, threatening to kill, and assault with a weapon in October 2020. Kempson is subsequently convicted of raping another British tourist in November 2020. The film blurb ends with statistics about the use of the rough sex defence in domestic violence and murder cases in the United Kingdom.

== Production ==
=== Conception and development ===
The Lie was directed by Helena Coan, and produced by Matthew Metcalfe and Tom Blackwell of GFC Films. Coan said that she was motivated to produce the documentary by Grace Millane's murderer Jesse Kempson's rough sex murder defence, which she said blamed the victim. Coan took a victim-centric approach to the case, with the documentary focusing on the themes and issues of gender violence, social attitudes, abusive behaviour and Kempson's rough sex defence.

The producers Blackwell and Meltcafe said that the film sought to tackle the issue of "male entitlement", with Blackwell stating that the production team wanted to make "every male in the audience to be uncomfortable at times" with the goals of starting hard conversations around male misbehaviour. Similarly, Meltcafe described male entitlement as a "dysfunction" in society that men needed to address. Coan also sought the blessing of Millane's family to produce the film including her mother Gillian, who approved of the project.

=== Editing and filming ===
The documentary consisted of a selection of interviews, CCTV footage, police interview tapes and newsreels to create a timeline of Grace Millane's murder and the subsequent arrest and trial of her murderer Jesse Kempson. The film featured CCTV footage of Millane's Tinder date with Kempson and interviews with Detective Inspector Scott Beard, who served as the lead investigator on the Millane murder case. In addition, Coan researched Millane's Instagram and Twitter posts to assist with the production.

Coan took a "step-by-step" approach to Millane's murder case, stating "It was all about making it immersive and uncomfortable and unflinching. I wanted to make a film that stays with the viewer long after they've watched it." During the editing process, Coan removed shots that she felt focused too long on Kempson's face or kept him in frame for an unnecessary length of time to avoid the "true crime" approach used in many crime documentaries.

== Release ==
On 17 January 2024, The Hollywood Reporter reported that Brainstorm Media had acquired the North American distribution rights to The Lie with plans to release the film in Spring 2024. The distribution deal was negotiated between Pip Ngo of XYZ Films and Alex Peters of Brainstorm Media.

The Lie was released in New Zealand cinemas on 25 April 2024. It received an M (Mature) rating from the Classification Office due to its references to sexual and domestic violence.

The film was also released on New Zealand streaming service Neon on 29 May 2024. It was also released on several other streaming platforms including Netflix, Apple TV, Google TV, YouTube and AroVision. The film became Netflix's "number one" film in New Zealand and Australia following its release in early September 2024.

== Reception ==
The review aggregator website Rotten Tomatoes reported an approval rating of 71%, based on seven reviews.

Karl Puschmann of The New Zealand Herald gave a positive review, describing the film as "compelling but harrowing." He wrote: "With its extensive use of CCTV footage, The Lie meticulously and thoroughly presents its terrible truth."

Jessica Weale of Good Magazine praised The Lie for challenging the "rough sex" defence use in cases of violence against women. Weale wrote: "By challenging this narrative and advocating for its ban, the documentary confronts society with the uncomfortable truth behind such claims and their detrimental impact on justice and accountability. "
