= A Mistake (film) =

2024 film by Christine Jeffs

- Release poster
- Directed by: Christine Jeffs
- Screenplay by: Christine Jeffs
- Based on: A Mistake by Carl Shuker
- Produced by: Christine Jeffs; Matthew Metcalfe
- Starring: Elizabeth Banks; Simon McBurney; Mickey Sumner; Rena Owen; Richard Crouchley; Matthew Sunderland
- Cinematography: John Toon
- Edited by: Paul Maxwell
- Music by: Frank Ilfman
- Production companies: Ingenious Media; New Zealand Film Commission; GFC Films
- Distributed by: Roadshow Entertainment
- Release date: 7 June 2024 (Tribeca)
- Running time: 101 minutes
- Country: New Zealand
- Language: English
- Box office: $32,811

A Mistake is a 2024 New Zealand medical-drama film, written, directed, and produced by Christine Jeffs, based upon the novel of the same name by Carl Shuker. It stars Elizabeth Banks, Simon McBurney, Mickey Sumner, Rena Owen, Richard Crouchley, and Matthew Sunderland.

It had its world premiere at Tribeca Festival on 7 June 2024.

== Premise ==
A veteran surgeon makes a fateful decision during a surgery by allowing an inexperienced colleague to take her place. When a fatal mistake occurs, the surgeon finds herself in a difficult situation.

== Cast ==
- Elizabeth Banks as Elizabeth Taylor
- Simon McBurney as Andrew McGrath
- Mickey Sumner as Robin
- Rena Owen as Tessa
- Fern Sutherland as Jessica
- Joel Tobeck as Alistair
- Emmett Skilton as Alexander Colton
- Matthew Sunderland as Owen
- Richard Crouchley as Richard
- Sarah Peirse as Mary, Head of Surgery

== Production ==
In May 2022, it was announced Elizabeth Banks had joined the cast with Christine Jeffs set to direct from a screenplay she wrote based upon the novel of the same name by Carl Shuker. In November 2022, Mickey Sumner joined the cast.

== Release ==
It had its world premiere at Tribeca Festival on 7 June 2024. In August 2024, Quiver Distribution acquired North America distribution rights to the film.

== Reception ==
On the review aggregator website Rotten Tomatoes, 72% of 18 critics' reviews are positive, with an average rating of 6.6/10.
