= Never Look Away (2024 film) =

2024 New Zealand documentary film

- Film poster
- Directed by: Lucy Lawless
- Written by: Whetham Allpress; Tom Blackwell; Lucy Lawless; Matthew Metcalfe
- Produced by: Tom Blackwell; Lucy Lawless; Matthew Metcalfe
- Starring: Margaret Moth
- Cinematography: Jenna Boss; Darryl Ward
- Edited by: Whetham Allpress
- Music by: Jason Smith; Karl Sölve Steven
- Production companies: General Film Corporation; Ingenious Media
- Distributed by: Greenwich Entertainment; Kaleidoscope Films
- Release date: 30 September 2024 (Sundance)
- Running time: 85 minutes
- Country: New Zealand
- Language: English

Never Look Away is a 2024 New Zealand documentary film, directed by Lucy Lawless. The film is a portrait of Margaret Moth, a New Zealand photojournalist who was a longtime war reporter for CNN.

The film premiered at the 2024 Sundance Film Festival. It was subsequently screened at an extensive variety of international documentary and general interest film festivals, winning awards including the Jury Award at the Calgary Underground Film Festival, and runner-up for the Audience Choice award for documentaries at the 2024 Cinéfest Sudbury International Film Festival.

The documentary won the Clio Visualizing History Award at the 2024 Middlebury New Filmmakers Festival.

== Reception ==
On the review aggregator website Rotten Tomatoes, 93% of 42 critics' reviews are positive, with an average rating of 7.4/10. The website's consensus reads: "Director Lucy Lawless acquits herself terrifically as a documentarian with this impressive first feature, helped along by an indomitable subject who proves impossible to look away from."

Joe Leydon of Variety wrote, "The thin line between cheating death and chasing it appears to have been smudged, repeatedly, by maverick video journalist Margaret Moth, the subject of first-time filmmaker Lucy Lawless' fascinating documentary Never Look Away. At least, that's the impression we're left with at the end of this compact yet complex portrait of a singularly and aggressively unconventional war correspondent who inspired equal measures of admiration and anxiety among her friends, colleagues and lovers throughout her 20 years of assignments in the world's trouble spots — Baghdad, Sarajevo, Afghanistan, Lebanon, Zaire, you name it, she was there — for CNN."
