= Giselle (film) =

2013 film

- Directed by: Toa Fraser
- Written by: Toa Fraser
- Produced by: Matthew Metcalfe
- Starring: Gillian Murphy
- Cinematography: Leon Narbey
- Release date: July 2013 (New Zealand)
- Running time: 104 minutes
- Country: New Zealand
- Language: English

Giselle is a 2013 New Zealand drama film written and directed by Toa Fraser. It was screened in the Contemporary World Cinema section at the 2013 Toronto International Film Festival. The film is based on the 2012 production Giselle, performed by The Royal New Zealand Ballet which many of the cast members are part of.

== Cast ==
- Gillian Murphy as Giselle
- Abigail Boyle as Myrtha
- Jacob Chown as Hilarion
- Maclean Hopper as Wilfrid
- Qi Huan as Albrecht
