= Dean Spanley =

2008 British film by Toa Fraser

- UK quad format cinema poster
- Directed by: Toa Fraser
- Screenplay by: Alan Sharp
- Based on: My Talks with Dean Spanley by Lord Dunsany
- Produced by: Matthew Metcalfe; Alan Harris
- Starring: Jeremy Northam; Peter O'Toole; Sam Neill; Bryan Brown; Judy Parfitt; Dudley Sutton
- Cinematography: Leon Narbey
- Edited by: Chris Plummer
- Music by: Don McGlashan
- Production companies: NZ Film Commission; Atlantic Film Group; General Film Corporation; Lipsync Productions
- Distributed by: Icon Entertainment International
- Release dates: 6 September 2008 (Toronto); 12 December 2008 (UK); 26 February 2009 (NZ)
- Running time: 100 minutes
- Countries: United Kingdom; New Zealand
- Language: English
- Budget: $15 million
- Box office: $1.4 million

Dean Spanley is a 2008 New Zealand/British comedy drama film, with fantastic elements, directed by Fijian New Zealander Toa Fraser. Set in Edwardian England, the film is based on an Alan Sharp adaptation of Irish author Lord Dunsany's 1936 novella My Talks with Dean Spanley. It stars Sam Neill as the Dean, Jeremy Northam and Peter O'Toole as Fisk Junior and Fisk Senior respectively and Bryan Brown as Wrather.

== Plot ==
The narrative is called "a surreal period comedic tale of canine reincarnation exploring the relationships between father and son and master and dog". Peter O'Toole said that the film's use of comedy to explore the relationship between a father and son was part of the attraction for him: "All of us have had these difficult familial relationships and I think it's a film for all of us who understand the relationship between a father and son. It's been interesting watching how various members of the crew have been looking at the monitors during scenes, because they come up to me and say, 'I had the same thing with my father.'"

=== Storyline ===
In the very early 1900s, Henslowe Fisk lives beholden to his father, the difficult Horatio Fisk. The Fisk family has suffered first the loss of its younger son, Harrington Fisk (Xavier Horan), killed in the Second Anglo-Boer War, shortly followed by the death of Horatio's wife. Fisk Senior is looked after by his housekeeper Mrs Brimley (Judy Parfitt) who has lost her husband. Fisk Junior reluctantly visits his father every Thursday.

One day, trying to entertain his father, Fisk Junior takes him to a lecture by a visiting swami (Art Malik) about the transmigration of souls. The lecture is also attended by the new local clergyman, Dean Spanley (Sam Neill).

Later the same day Fisk Junior encounters the Dean at his father's club. A chance third meeting leads to an introduction. Fisk Junior, initially intrigued by the Dean's oddly open-minded views on reincarnation, is prompted to look beyond the Dean's appearance (that of an affable, rather bland clergyman) by his weakness for certain peculiar sensations produced by Hungarian Imperial Tokay wine, which leads him into a dreamlike state. Working with his clever friend Wrather (Bryan Brown), an Australian "conveyancer", Fisk secures a batch of Tokay and the two entertain the Dean, who acts ever more strangely, starting to reveal memories of his previous life – as a Welsh Spaniel. These memories are acute and convincing, including rich feelings around food and communication with other canines, a deep distaste for cats and pigs, and the joy of serving his master.

As the story unfolds, Fisk Junior comes to understand his father's background better and the two draw closer. Fisk Senior recalls the beloved spaniel he owned as a child, who ran away one day and was never found. Fisk Junior believes that the Dean is the reincarnation of his father's dog. Attending a dinner with Wrather and the two Fisks, the Dean reminisces about the day he ran away from home with a friendly stray dog. The two dogs spent a perfect day together; chasing a neighbouring farmer's sheep, hunting a rabbit, and barking at the moon. The Dean recalls heading home across the farmer's field, only to be shot by the farmer. He tells Fisk Senior that it was sudden and he felt no pain; reassurance that helps Fisk Senior finally accept the death of his son Harrington.

As the Dean and Wrather leave the dinner party, it's implied that Wrather was the friendly stray dog in a past life. Mrs Brimley recounts the evening's events to her husband's empty chair. Fisk Junior begins to visit his father more regularly. Fisk Senior adopts a new dog and spends time in his wife's garden.

== Cast ==
- Jeremy Northam as Fisk Junior (Henslowe)
- Sam Neill as Dean Spanley
- Bryan Brown as J. J. Wrather
- Peter O'Toole as Fisk Senior (Horatio)
- Judy Parfitt as Mrs Brimley
- Art Malik as Swami Nala Prash
- Ramon Tikaram as the Nawab of Ranjiput
- Xavier Horan as Harrington Fisk
- Barbara Wilshere as first lady
- Angela Clerkin as second lady
- Dudley Sutton as Marriott
- Shaughan Seymour as wine shop proprietor
- Charlotte Graham as woman in cloisters
- Hayden Downing as boy in cloisters
- Miriama McDowell as foxy lady
- Bruce Hopkins as shepherd
- Elizabeth Goram-Smith as a young lady of stature (uncredited)
- Nick Shaw as Man of stature (uncredited)

== Production ==
=== Optioning ===
The novella was optioned from the Dunsany Will Trust through Curtis Brown of London by Alan Sharp. Support for the production came from both English (Screen East) and New Zealand (NZ Film Commission) government agencies, with financing completed by Aramid Entertainment, General Film Corporation and Lipsync Productions. Both producers, the director, some of the lead cast (Neill was born in Northern Ireland but grew up in New Zealand, where he resided at his death), the cinematographer, the editor, the composer and a number of other members of the production crew and cast are from New Zealand.

=== Writing ===
The adapted screenplay was written by Alan Sharp, with clearance from the Dunsany Literary Estate. Trevor Johnston has written, "If you read the original story before seeing the film ..., then see the film, what’s striking is that Sharp has not so much effected an adaptation as a reinvention."

=== Locations ===
Principal filming began at Wisbech in Cambridgeshire (including Wisbech Castle and Peckover House) on 10 November 2007, continuing for some weeks and taking in the heritage area of the Crescent, the Castle and the museum. It continued at Holkham Hall in Norfolk and Elveden Hall in Suffolk, once home to and remodelled for the last Maharajah of Punjab in the years just before the film's setting. Elm Hill in Norwich and the cloisters at Norwich Cathedral were also used. Further filming took place in New Zealand.

=== Technology ===
The movie was shot on 16 mm film and digitally, in 1:1.85 ratio, using Arri 416 and D-20 cameras, with digital intermediate post-production by Lipsync Productions.

=== Music ===
An original soundtrack was composed by New Zealand composer Don McGlashan. A soundtrack CD was released in New Zealand on Warner Music (NZ) 5186531802 consisting of 14 tracks and a running time of 41:05. Background choir music was provided by the 30-voice New Zealand choir Musica Sacra.

== Release and reception ==
Ahead of general release, Dean Spanley was shown twice at the 2008 Toronto International Film Festival, where it received a red-carpet gala premiere, the first New Zealand production ever to do so. It also had two showings at the London Film Festival, and was also shown at the largest film festival in Asia, the Pusan International.

The United Kingdom general release was announced by Icon Distribution for 12 December, and a "U" classification issued by the British Board of Film Classification. In Ireland it was certified "G" and was released on the same date. The film was certified in Australia as "G" also, and was released 5 March 2009, and in New Zealand 26 February 2009; distribution in both Australia and New Zealand was by Paramount.

In early November, the film was offered to United States distributors at the annual American Film Market (5–12 November), with two showings announced, and in early February 2009, Miramax bought the United States rights. However, rather than opening in theatres in the U.S., it went straight to cable.

A region-2 DVD was released in 2009. A region-1 DVD was released in 2010.

The novella, out of print for some years, was re-issued from HarperCollins in 2008. It included the film screenplay, set photos, publicity stills and interviews and comments from the cast, director, producers and crew members.

=== Critical response ===
Receiving a standing ovation at the gala premiere, initial commentary was positive, with particular praise for O'Toole's performance and the final "act".

Reviews were generally positive, Rotten Tomatoes website gives the film a rating of 88% based on 32 reviews. The critical consensus describes the film as "Offbeat, whimsical, period-set shaggy dog story with daffy performances from Sam Neill and Peter O’Toole."

Dean Spanley was longlisted for the 2009 British Academy of Film and Television Arts awards for Adapted Screenplay (Alan Sharp) and Supporting Actor (Peter O'Toole).
