= Murder of Amber-Rose Rush =

2018 crime in Dunedin, New Zealand

- Location: Dunedin, New Zealand
- Date: 3 February 2018
- Attack type: Murder by stabbing
- Perpetrator: Venod Skantha
- Verdict: Guilty
- Sentence: Life imprisonment

Amber-Rose Rush was a 16-year-old New Zealander whose death in Dunedin in February 2018 drew extensive national media coverage. Venod Skantha, a 30-year-old Dunedin doctor, was subsequently charged with her murder. The trial of Skantha commenced on 4 November 2019 at the Dunedin High Court on a charge of murder and four counts of threatening to kill. On 26 November 2019, Skantha was found guilty of all charges. In 2020 he was sentenced to life imprisonment, with a minimum non-parole term of 19 years. On 14 April 2021, the New Zealand Court of Appeal dismissed Skantha's appeal and affirmed his conviction. The following day, Skantha was reported to have died in custody.

== Background ==
Amber-Rose Rush was a 16-year-old from the Dunedin suburb of Corstorphine. Her family described her as a talented artist. She had ambitions of becoming a police officer. According to a media report, she had recently left school to start work in a shop.

On 3 February 2018, Amber-Rose Rush's mother Lisa Ann Rush, her partner Brendon MacNee, and older brother Jayden Rush had found the Dunedin teenager dead in her own bedroom. In court, Jayden recalled that he had knocked on her door after midnight but did not get a response from her and assumed she was asleep. The family subsequently contacted the police.

== Investigation ==
The Police cordoned off the property and carried out a forensic scene examination over the weekend. Emergency services also searched a nearby Dunedin quarry as part of the investigation into her death. Police officers also searched a nearby pond at Blackhead Quarry. They also sought to speak to anyone who have visited the quarry or beach area between 11.30pm on February 2 and 12.30am on February 3. Police also took an interest in the a dark-coloured vehicle believed to be a Toyota Camry, which was parked in the car park at Blackhead Quarry.

As part of their investigation, the Police drained a swamp at Blackhead Quarry, from which they recovered Amber-Rose's Huawei cellphone. The phone was replicated and its contents were later used as evidence by the Crown.

=== Suspect ===
The sole suspect was Venod Skantha, who at the time of Amber-Rose Rush's death had worked as a house officer at the Dunedin Public Hospital, which was then managed by the Southern District Health Board. According to media reports, the Malaysian–born Skantha had previously lived in Auckland's North Shore suburb with his parents. He studied medicine at the University of Auckland. In mid-2016, Skantha started his medical career at Southland Hospital in Invercargill before transferring to the Dunedin Public Hospital the following year. According to media reports, Skantha and Amber-Rose knew each other.

While living in Dunedin, Skantha had socialized with young people including teenagers, to whom he supplied drugs and alcohol. He also gained a reputation for alcoholism and erratic attention-seeking behaviour. Skantha sought relationships with several women and girls, reportedly fondling them and offering money for sex. Prior to Amber-Rose's death, Skantha had reportedly faced dismissal from the Dunedin Public Hospital for being drunk while performing a procedure and negligent behaviour. However, he had escaped dismissal by claiming that his mother had died, which turned out to be untrue.

Amber-Rose was part of Skantha's Dunedin social circle but relations between the two had deteriorated by early February 2018. According to the Crown, during a heated exchange on February 2, 2018, the victim had threatened to report Skantha to his employers and the authorities for molesting teenagers, offering them money for sex, and supplying them with alcohol during a heated Instagram exchange. The Crown argued that the defendant had hired a teenage friend to drive him to Amber-Rose's house where he murdered her in order to prevent her from reporting him to the authorities. The witness had later cleaned Skantha's silver BMW and shoes but afterwards reported him to the police.

== Legal proceedings ==
=== Arraignment and pre-trial proceedings ===
On 5 February 2018, Venod Skantha appeared in the Dunedin District Court and was charged with the murder of Amber-Rose. The accused was given interim name suppression but was identified as a registered junior doctor who was popular with teenagers. On 21 May, Skantha was identified as the suspect after the Court of Appeal declined his application for name suppression. In addition, the defendant was also charged with four counts of threatening to kill. On 23 May, Skantha was also charged with indecent sexual assault.

In August 2018, Skantha dismissed his Auckland-based defence lawyer Mark Ryan in favour of the Christchurch-based Jonathan Eaton. That same month, Skantha's application for electronically monitored bail was denied by the Dunedin High Court. In September 2018, that decision was upheld by the Court of Appeal. On 15 August, Skantha appealed to the Court of Appeal for bail. The defendant had been remanded into custody at the Otago Corrections Facility in Milton in the Otago Region. In early September 2018, the Court of Appeal dismissed Skantha's appeal against the refusal of bail.

On 22 November 2018, Skantha appeared via video link in the Dunedin High Court to discuss pre-trial issues. On 17 January 2019, the Dunedin High Court dismissed Skantha's bid to have his trial moved out of Dunedin. Following a hearing held in March 2019, Skantha was denied bail a fourth time on 2 April 2019. Skantha's application for bail had been denied by the Dunedin High Court and the Court of Appeal three times.

=== Opening arguments ===
The trial of Venod Skantha commenced on 4 November 2019 before Justice Gerald Nation and a jury of ten men and two women. The Crown prosecutor Richard Smith said that Amber-Rose Rush was part of a group of teenagers that Skantha had befriended and supplied alcohol and drugs. The Crown argued that Skantha had allegedly indecently assaulted Amber-Rose in early 2018 and claimed that he had murdered her in order to prevent her from informing the authorities, which would have ended his medical career. The Crown also said that Skantha had gotten a 16-year-old friend (who has name suppression) to drive him to Amber-Rose's house so that he could murder her. The Crown said that blood likely to belong to Amber-Rose had been found in the defendant's silver BMW, a plastic bag containing the defendant's clothes, and a pair of shoes found at the defendant's girlfriend's house in Balclutha. Skantha's defence lawyer Jonathan Eaton QC disputed the Crown's evidence, claiming that his client did not know the layout of the Rush home.

=== Trial evidence ===
The Crown utilised forensic evidence from Rush's body and Skantha's shoes and car, testimony from Amber-Rose's family and friends, Skantha's former girlfriend Brigid Clinton, Detective Constable Amy Stewart, and Southern District Health Board chief medical officer Dr Nigel Millar.

The Crown's star witness was the teenager who had accompanied Skantha during the time of the alleged murder. He testified that Skantha's clothes were bloodstained, that the defendant had admitted killing Amber-Rose, and had also taken her cellphone and driver's license. He told the court that the pair had driven to Blackhead Quarry to dispose of Amber-Rose's phone before heading to Skantha's Fairfield home where the alleged clean-up began. The teenager claimed that he had deliberately done a sloppy cleaning job in order to leave a trail of evidence for the police, including a blood stain on Skantha's grey suede shoes. The witness also testified that they had then driven to Clinton's house in Balclutha where Skantha allegedly burned his bloodstained clothes. The witness admitted being a "compulsive liar" but maintained that his account of the events were true. During cross-examination, defence lawyer Eaton QC accused the teenage witness of killing Amber-Rose, citing his estranged relationship with the victim and his knowledge of her house layout.

=== Closing arguments ===
On 26 November, the Crown and defence delivered their closing arguments to the court. Crown prosecutor Bates argued that Skantha had murdered the defendant to prevent Amber-Rose from exposing his indiscretions to the authorities, which would have caused him to lose his career and lifestyle. Defence lawyer Eaton QC disputed the Crown's case, claiming that the Crown's teenage star witness was unreliable due to his habit of lying and that the Crown had failed to investigate whether the witness had murdered the defendant. During the trial, the defence did not produce any witnesses.

=== Verdict ===
On 26 November, Skantha was unanimously found guilty by the jury of murder and four counts of threatening to kill the Crown's witness and their family. The trial lasted three and a half weeks with the Crown calling 69 witnesses and presenting more than 1,000 pages of evidence. The verdict was welcomed by Amber-Rose's family including her father Shane Rush. The defendant was remanded into custody until 6 March 2020 for sentencing.

=== Sentencing ===
On 6 March 2020, Skantha was sentenced to a life sentence with a non-parole term of 19 years in the Dunedin High Court. The sentence was welcomed by Rush's family including her father. Skantha has maintained his innocence and his lawyer Eaton announced that he would be appealing the verdict on the basis of a miscarriage of justice. Rush's family were upset that Skantha wore earplugs during the victim impact statement by her deceased mother and subsequent sentencing. He was not convicted of indecent assault.

== Skantha's appeal and death ==
In mid-November 2020, Skantha's lawyer Jonathan Eaton, QC appealed the verdict at the New Zealand Court of Appeal, claiming that the trial judge Justice Gerald Nation lacked "essential balance" and sided with the prosecution. The Crown defended the Judge, arguing that he balanced his comments in considerable overall detail.

On 14 April 2021, the Court of Appeal dismissed Skantha's appeal against his conviction, ruling that they were satisfied that the evidence proved that the man killed Rush and also threatened to kill four people in order to silence a witness. Rush's father Shane welcomed the Court of Appeal's ruling, stating that the trial and appeal process had cost the family significant stress.

The following day, it was reported that Skantha had died in custody at the Otago Corrections Facility the previous day. His death was not treated as suspicious and has been referred to the Coroner. Corrections officials acknowledged that they were unaware of the dismissal of Skantha's appeal but confirmed that Skantha had received communication about the Court of Appeal's dismissal in a phone call from a representative of his legal counsel. In addition, Corrections confirmed that they had attempted to save Skantha's life. Shane Rush expressed relief that the family would no longer need to concern themselves with appeals or parole hearings following Skantha's death, while conveying his condolences to Skantha's family.

== Reactions ==
Amber-Rose Rush's family and friends held a funeral at Hope and Sons Chapel in South Dunedin. Several family members also got tattoos based on Amber's bird and flower design as a tribute to the late teenager. A "Givealittle" fundraiser page was also set up, which had raised NZ$8,445 by 14 February 2018.

On 14 June 2018, a fake Instagram account of Amber-Rose was taken down after complaints from her family. That same month, it was reported that Amber-Rose's mother Lisa-Ann had died in an alleged suicide.

On 10 November 2019, Radio New Zealand broadcaster Colin Peacock compared the media coverage of the Amber-Rose Rush murder trial to the Grace Millane murder trial, arguing that foreign media outlets' breaches of New Zealand name suppression orders in both cases threatened the fair trial rights for defendants. Similarly, an Otago Daily Times editorial published on 23 November argued that the Rush and Millane murder cases highlighted that women were statistically more likely to be victims of violent crimes than men.
