= Countess Palatine Ingrid von Marburg =

Fictional character on the American TV series Salem

- Salem character
- Lucy Lawless as Countess Palatine Ingrid von Marburg
- First appearance: "Cry Havoc" (2.01)
- Last appearance: "Black Sunday" (3.10)
- Created by: Brannon Braga; Adam Simon
- Portrayed by: Lucy Lawless; Janet Montgomery

In-universe information
- Aliases: Swallower of Souls; Hecate; Medea; Elizabeth Báthory; Last of the True Witches; Water Witch; Queen of Queens
- Species: Witch
- Gender: Female
- Occupation: Countess; Palatine
- Children: Sebastian Von Marburg; Anne Hale
- Notable powers: Telepathy; Resurrection; Water manipulation; Spirit possession; Astral projection

Countess Palatine Ingrid von Marburg is a fictional character on the American supernatural horror television series Salem, which aired on WGN America from 2014 to 2017. Created by the show's producers Brannon Braga and Adam Simon, Ingrid was played by Lucy Lawless in a recurring role during the second season and third season. The last and oldest of a line of Germanic witches, Ingrid is portrayed as a rival and foil to the witch Mary Sibley (Janet Montgomery). Her plans to resurrect the Devil and have sex with his human host to become his queen were stopped by her daughter Anne Hale (Tamzin Merchant).

Lawless was attracted to the show due to its writing and the description of her role. She was prominently featured in promotional materials for Salem's second season. Lawless based her performance on historical accounts of witches and her childhood love of the horror genre. She avoided portraying Ingrid as a villain to focus on making her a more complex character.

Critical response to Countess Palatine Ingrid von Marburg was largely positive, with the character's story arc with Mary and Lawless' performance praised as highlights. Following the character's apparent death in the season two finale, fans requested for Lawless to return for future episodes. Lawless was nominated for the Fangoria Chainsaw Award for Best TV Supporting Actress, losing to Gillian Anderson for her performance in the television series Hannibal (2013-2015).

== Arc ==
The last and oldest in a line of Germanic witches, Countess Palatine Ingrid von Marburg is first shown looking for the identities of those behind the Grand Rite, a ritual involving the use of mass murder to elicit the rise of the Devil to Earth. Ingrid had attempted to complete the Grand Rite previously, but was thwarted by the witch hunter Increase Mather. While visiting Increase's son Cotton, she meets fellow witch Anne Hale and enters her soul through a kiss. During the exchange, she discovers that the witch Mary Sibley had instigated the ritual and exacerbated hysteria among the Puritans as part of the Salem witch trials. Ingrid also reveals that she lived for several centuries under various aliases, including Hecate, Medea, and Elizabeth Báthory. She is shown retaining her youthful appearance by bathing in the blood of virgins.

While working with her son and lover Baron Sebastian von Marburg, she begins to plan a way to infiltrate Salem, Massachusetts and learn more about its local witch coven (known as the Essex Hive). By bewitching Mary's bathwater, Ingrid dispatches a specter to drown her. Even though the attempt is unsuccessful, Ingrid kisses Mary to steal information from her unconscious mind. Upon arriving at Salem by boat, Ingrid and Mary meet for the first time and threaten one another. To destabilize Mary's control of the town, Ingrid murders her husband George Sibley by transferring water inside his body and drowning him from the inside.

Ingrid's arrival at Salem is received positively by the townspeople, as she delivers aid to those affected by a plague started by the completion of the Grand Rite. During her time in the city, she begins to act as a fairy godmother to the witch Mercy Lewis by teaching her magic and how to cleanse her body by bathing in the blood of virgins. She also convinces Anne to steal magistrate John Hale's Book of Shadows, telepathically telling the young witch that she plans to sacrifice the entire town to resurrect the Devil. Ingrid senses the truth behind Mary's son John Sibley, who was born to serve as the vessel for the Devil, and schemes to gain control over him. She orders Mercy to kidnap John, but Mary stops these plans temporarily by threatening to destroy the source of Ingrid's power. Mary hides her son's location to shield him from Ingrid's influence.

Ingrid uses her connections with magistrate Wendell Hathorne and seduces Mary's love John Alden, leading him into an alternate dimension to uncover John Sibley's hiding place. To convince Anne to kidnap John Sibley, Ingrid reveals to the young witch that she is her real mother, and will pass down all of her powers following her death. Even though the witches of the Essex Hive resist Ingrid's plans, she destroys John Sibley's body and soul by drowning him in a magical, tar-like substance known as "hell blood". Following the Devil's resurrection, Ingrid shuns Mercy and reverses all of the magic done to enhance her appearance, which leaves her heavily scarred with burns. Despite her schemes, Ingrid is upset to learn that the Devil plans to make Mary his queen instead of her. Ingrid and Mary fight in the Salem Church, with Mary sacrificing herself to protect John Alden. Angry at Mary's death, the Devil kills Ingrid by stabbing her repeatedly.

After Ingrid's apparent death, her soul transfers back to her original body (a mummified corpse) that is protected in a magical sarcophagus hidden in an alternate dimension. It is revealed that Ingrid possesses a form of immortality; she can return her soul to her original body and recover her strength. While locked in her decaying body, she instructs Sebastian to feed her regularly with blood stolen from Mary as a form of nourishment. When Sebastian seeks advice from Ingrid on how to form a romantic relationship with the newly resurrected Mary, she tells him to use witchcraft; Sebastian refuses to use magic to force Mary to love him. By drinking Mary's blood, Ingrid gains enough power to possess Mary temporarily and starts to have sex with the Devil. However, she is interrupted by Anne, who kills the Devil's human host and sends him back to hell. Anne announces that she plans to carry the Devil's child and serve as his queen instead of Ingrid. Despite her attempts to reconnect with her daughter, Ingrid is killed by Anne. Restoring Mary's soul back to her body, Anne destroys Ingrid's body and spirit permanently.

== Development ==
=== Casting and promotion ===
Countess Palatine Ingrid von Marburg is portrayed by New Zealand actress Lucy Lawless. On being asked to join Salem, and hearing the description of her role, Lawless said that connected it to her childhood listening to horror stories and watching horror films. She felt that Ingrid embodied the horror genre, and had more complex character interactions than her previous performances. She agreed to be in the series in part because of her appreciation of its writing. On January 14, 2015, WGN America announced that Lawless would appear in the second season in recurring capacity. The character was prominently featured in a preview video of the series premiere, and the trailer for Salem's second season. The New York Times' Neil Genzlinger felt that the decision to hire Lawless was based on her status as "one of television’s most cult-inspiring actresses" and the plan to expand on the series' over-the-top horror elements. Lawless does not make a physical appearance during the third season, only providing voice-overs for the character. Janet Montgomery, who plays Mary Sibley, fills in for the role after Ingrid possesses the character's body.

=== Characterization and morality ===
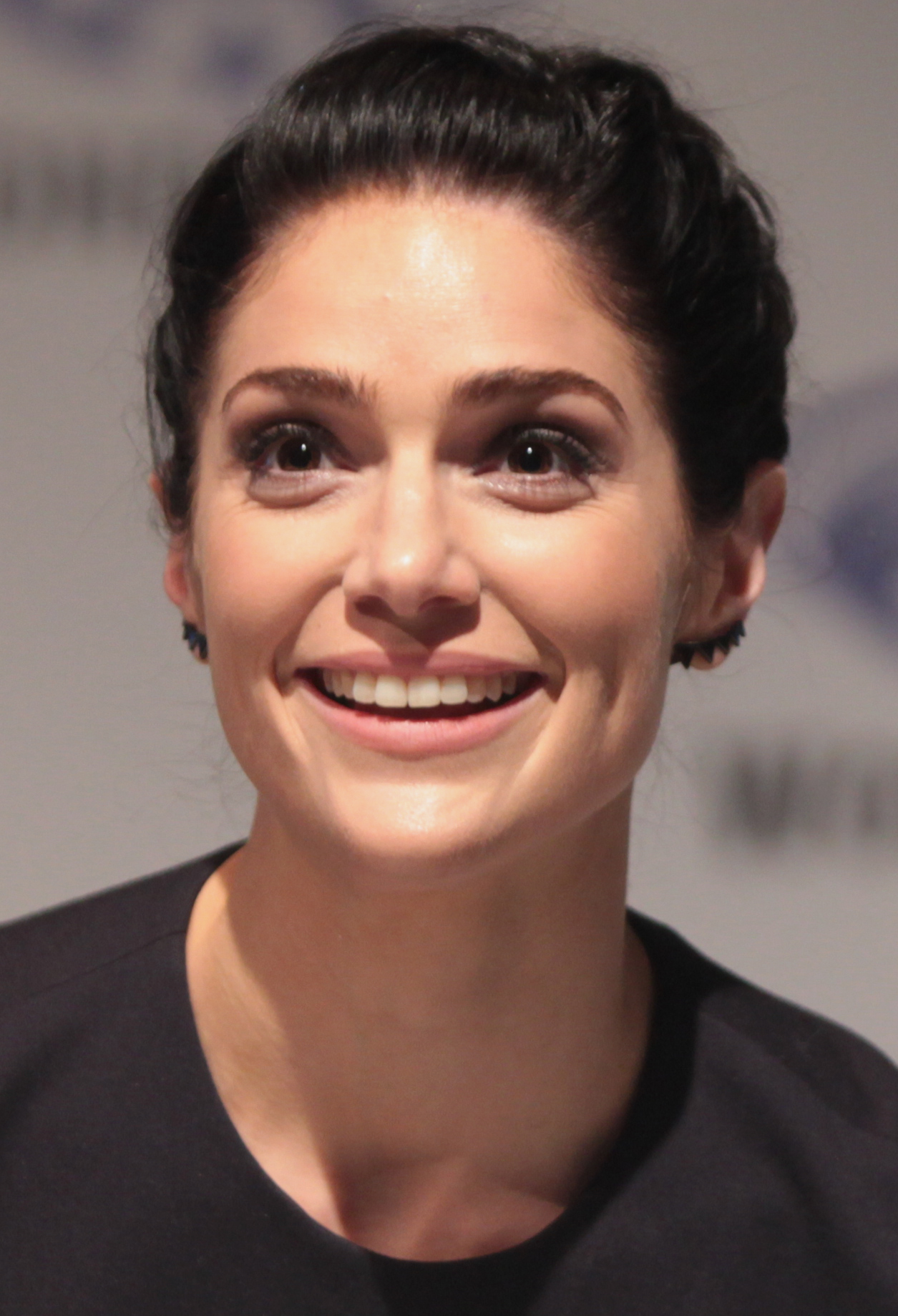
Countess Palatine Ingrid von Marburg was written as a rival and foil to fellow witch Mary Sibley, who was portrayed by Janet Montgomery (pictured).

While discussing her approach to Ingrid, Lawless said that she was inspired by stories of witches throughout history, and explained: "[w]hether they were rumor or not, we've got lots of great information about how they've lived and what made them so terrifying". Surprised by the amount of history incorporated into Salem, she commented that show creators Adam Simon and Brannon Braga relied on "anecdotal evidence of people at the time" when writing storylines for her character and the rest of the cast. Lawless characterized Ingrid as a "serious piece of work" and the "soul of violence" while also possessing "her charms and her wits and her elegance and her generosity".

When asked about the magical aspects of Salem, she said that the series was based on "all natural magic", and identified her character as a "psychological murderer as well as a practical murderer". Defining the show as using "murder in the parlor" and "women fighting to the death in a very elevated way," Lawless emphasized that it treated magic differently than the Harry Potter franchise, commenting that there is "nothing cute going on". She said that Ingrid's story arc was partially based on the character's obsession and rivalry with Mary and the inevitable vendetta to destroy her. Bustle's Kelsea Stahler identified Ingrid as Mary's foil, emphasizing the ability of Lawless' character to charm and appeal to the city of Salem and its inhabitants.

When asked if she viewed Ingrid as evil, Lawless said that she did not play the character as a villain, and instead interpreted her as a "someone who must get what she wants" even if it meant harming others. While the character was developed as "the biggest, baddest bitch in the world", Lawless requested that Ingrid would also be represented as a "very constructive force" with a "great goodness" and a "great weakness" for evil. While Lawless felt that her character was incapable of love, she believed that Ingrid feels emotional conflict while performing evil deeds, and played her decisions as appealing to a greater good. Despite this separation, she did acknowledge that Ingrid is one of the series' antagonists. She referenced Ingrid as a "female Dracula", and Simon said that the character was similar to a "dark goddess figure". Lawless clarified that the character was immoral and unethical by both contemporary standards and those of the eighteenth century. She commented that she felt uncomfortable shooting scenes in which Ingrid commits acts of violence against women and children. She explained that she had to disconnect from her personal opinions to make "a new high-end horror".

Lawless that Ingrid's costumes allowed her to get into character, saying that she feels "like she consumes me". Forty-seven years old at the time of the second season's filming, she said that she was surprised at the glamorous aspects of her wardrobe given her age. While discussing her age, she joked that she was initially uncomfortably when shooting the character's first appearance in which she is shown nude in a bath; Lawless said that she had a body double for the scene.

== Critical reception ==
Television critics have included Countess Palatine Ingrid von Marburg in their favorite moments from Salem. Bustle's Nick Romano listed Lawless' appearance as one of the seven reasons from the season two trailer to get "so amped" about the upcoming episodes. The Hollywood Reporter's Marisa Roffman commended the battle between Ingrid and Mary as "one of the most impressive sequences of the [season two] finale". While reviewing the series finale, Screener's Aaron Pruner wrote that Ingrid's scheme to take control of Mary's body to have sex with an adult version of Mary's son while he is possessed by the Devil and steal his magic to take over the world as one of the biggest WTF moments.

Lawless' performance has been widely praised by critics. Blastr's Nathalie Caron wrote that the actress had a "glorious guest-starring role as the deliciously evil Countess Marburg". Fangoria's Ken W. Hanley called Lawless "frightfully fiendish", praising her for bringing more "gravitas" to the show since she was "unafraid to get bloody or sadistic". Echoing Hanley's statement, D.C. Fenoff of Moviepilot felt that her inclusion gave the series more "energy and conflict". Following her introduction to Salem, Kerry Harvey of Stuff.co.nz commended Lawless as "a scene-stealer", and felt it supported her reputation as "a fearless performer who is not afraid to tackle strong – and sometimes flawed – female roles". In 2016, Lawless was nominated for the Fangoria Chainsaw Award for Best TV Supporting Actress, but lost to Gillian Anderson for her performance in the television series Hannibal (2013-2015).

Following Ingrid's apparent death in the season two finale, Nemisha Sharma of the International Business Times wrote that the she wanted to see the character return to the third season. Sharma described Ingrid as a "fan-favorite character", noting how fans had commented on the show's official Facebook page asking for Lawless to return for future episodes.
