= McLaren (film) =

2017 New Zealand documentary film by Roger Donaldson

- Theatrical release poster
- Directed by: Roger Donaldson
- Written by: James Brown; Matthew Metcalfe; Tim Woodhouse
- Story by: Matthew Metcalfe; Glenn Standring
- Produced by: Fraser Brown; Matthew Metcalfe
- Starring: Dwayne Cameron
- Cinematography: David Paul
- Edited by: Tim Woodhouse
- Music by: J. Peter Robinson
- Production companies: Universal Pictures; FB Pictures; General Film Corporation
- Distributed by: Transmission Films
- Release dates: 25 May 2017 (United Kingdom); 1 June 2017 (New Zealand)
- Running time: 92 minutes
- Country: New Zealand
- Language: English

McLaren is a 2017 New Zealand sports documentary film based on the life of Bruce McLaren, founder of the Bruce McLaren Motor Racing team. The film stars Dwayne Cameron as Bruce McLaren and was directed by Roger Donaldson.

== Synopsis ==
The film recounts the life of New Zealand motor car racer Bruce McLaren through interviews, archival footage, and recreations.

== Cast ==
- Dwayne Cameron as Bruce McLaren
- Matt Coldrick as English Doctor
- Mario Andretti as himself
- Alastair Caldwell as himself
- Emerson Fittipaldi as himself

== Production ==
Scenes were shot at 590 Remuera Rd, Remuera, Auckland 1050, New Zealand, where Bruce McLaren grew up.

== Release ==
The film premiered in the UK on 25 May 2017, followed by its release in New Zealand on 1 June 2017. The film screened at the 2017 Sydney Film Festival before being released in Australia on 21 June 2017.

== Reception ==
Ellie Walker-Arnott of Time Out gave it 4 out of 5 stars, writing, "A handful of dramatisations – intended to flesh out gaps in the narrative – jar while at times the film digs deep into detail in a way that threatens to alienate all but the most dedicated racing fans. But ultimately the human story of this scrappy and magnetic man keeps the doc on track." Zara Horn gave it 5 stars for telling the story of a motorsports legend who overcame his childhood physical challenges to pursue his passion and establish an enduring legacy.

Steve Newall of the New Zealand Herald gave it 3 out of 5 stars, writing that the film "should hold differing types of appeal to various generations. For older viewers it'll be the retelling of a familiar story of one of their fallen heroes, whereas others may gravitate to the mid-20th-century motorsport environment".

Peter Bradshaw of The Guardian gave it 2 out of 5 stars, calling it a "motor-racing film only for petrolheads" that "does not tell us why we should be interested in its subject" because it "makes no serious attempt at reaching out beyond its fanbase, connecting with non-petrolheads, or gaining any perspective on the sometimes scary and dysfunctional world of motor racing". John Nugent of Empire gave it 2 stars, writing that the film is "assembled in such a way that can only appeal to the target Top Gear demographic. Non-petrolheads need not apply."
