= Love Birds (2011 film) =

- Theatrical release poster
- Directed by: Paul Murphy
- Written by: Nick Ward
- Produced by: Alan Harris; Matthew Metcalfe
- Starring: Rhys Darby; Sally Hawkins; Bryan Brown
- Cinematography: Alun Bollinger
- Edited by: Chris Plummer
- Music by: Tim Prebble
- Production company: NZ Film Commission
- Distributed by: Hoyts Distribution
- Release date: 24 February 2011
- Running time: 103 minutes
- Country: New Zealand
- Language: English

Love Birds is a 2011 New Zealand romantic comedy film starring the New Zealand stand-up comedian Rhys Darby and the Golden Globe winner Sally Hawkins. It was directed by Paul Murphy and written by Nick Ward. It was released on 24 February 2011.

== Plot ==
Doug (Rhys Darby) lives in the perfect no worry world but his life shatters when long-term girlfriend Susan (Faye Smythe) dumps him. Doug discovers an injured paradise shelduck and starts to nurse it back to health. This new found motivation propels him into a new journey in his life which causes him to fall in love with veterinarian Holly (Sally Hawkins). The path to love is never easy and just when you think you have a handle on it, it takes flight. Susan comes back into Doug's life, and he must learn a valuable lesson: lean on his friends and follow his heart.

== Cast ==
- Rhys Darby as Doug
- Sally Hawkins as Holly
- Emily Barclay as Brenda
- Craig Hall as Craig Watson
- Bryan Brown as Dr Buster
- Dave Fane as Kanga
- Faye Smythe as Susan
- Wesley Dowdell as Brett
- Alvin Maharaj as Gurneesh
- John Callen as Professor Craddock
- John Leigh as Quizmaster
- Allan Border and Ian Smith: Cricket Commentators

== Critical reception ==
Love Birds received mixed reviews on release with Kate Rodger of TV3 saying the story "feels a little laboured, as does the humour" and giving it 2½ stars out of five. However, Russell Baillie of the New Zealand Herald praised the film, giving it 4 out of 5, and calling it an "endearingly funny, if sugar-coated local romantic comedy". Graeme Tuckett of The Dominion Post also gave the film 4 out of 5 writing, "Love Birds does what it does just fine. There is Queen on the soundtrack, love in the air, and quite probably a smile on your face as the credits roll."

Despite the film's overall mixed reviews, Darby received an overwhelmingly positive reception with reviewers quoted as saying, "Rhys Darby steals the show again, but in a very different role to what we are used to seeing him play. He plays the relatively straight role of a typical Kiwi bloke, but there is no hiding the charm and likeability he brings to the big screen." and "He's an affable, believable and extremely convincing lead - and based on this alone, he's destined for even greater things."

== Notes ==
The film is accompanied by the music of the rock band Queen (including "Somebody to love", "Who Wants to Live Forever", "Bicycle Race" and "Flash"). In the credits, all of the actors from the film dance, sing and play music to the playback of the Queen song "Princes of the Universe", title song for the film Highlander and the television series of the same name.
