= Toa Fraser =

New Zealand Fijian film director and playwright

Toa Fraser (born 1975) is a New Zealand born playwright and film director. His first feature film, No. 2, starring Ruby Dee won the Audience Award (World Dramatic) at the 2006 Sundance Film Festival. His second, Dean Spanley, starring Sam Neill, Jeremy Northam and Peter O'Toole, premiered in September 2008. His third film Giselle was selected to be screened in the Contemporary World Cinema section at the 2013 Toronto International Film Festival. His fourth, The Dead Lands, a Maori action-adventure film, was released in 2014.

== Life ==
Fraser's parents were English and Fijian. He moved to Auckland in 1989. He attended Sacred Heart College, Auckland and is a graduate of the University of Auckland. His father is Eugene Fraser who has worked for both the BBC and many other radio and TV stations across the world as a radio continuity presenter. In April 2021, Fraser announced via Twitter that he had been diagnosed with Young Onset Parkinson's disease in 2016.

== Career ==
His career proved a stellar one from early on. In 1998 he picked up awards for Best New Play (Bare) and Best New Playwright at the Chapman Tripp theatre awards. Toa received invaluable assistance from Michael Robinson who workshopped the play through many drafts before directing it at The Silo theatre in Auckland. The two-hander saw Ian Hughes and Madeleine Sami playing an array of 15 characters. Metro magazine called it "an instant classic". In 1999 he won the Sunday Star Times Bruce Mason Playwriting Award. The play toured internationally and enjoyed a sell out season at the Sydney Opera House.

It was his second play, No. 2 (1999) that catapulted him (and Sami) to fame, winning the Festival First Award at the 2000 Edinburgh Fringe Festival, alongside performances in Europe, Canada, Jamaica and Fiji. Set over the course of one day, as an elderly Fijian matriarch demands a family feast so she can choose her successor, the play saw Sami playing every role.

In 2000, Fraser worked for a year with director Vincent Ward on the screenplay for Ward's film River Queen. In the same period, he co-wrote a one-hour TV drama Staunch, with director Keith Hunter. It's the story of a young Maori woman (Once Were Warriors ' Mamaengaroa Kerr-Bell) defending herself against an unfair police prosecution, with the help of a social worker.

In 2001, Fraser was awarded the University of South Pacific's Writer in Residence Fellowship. There in Fiji, he began work on the film adaptation of No. 2, a process that would take four years and an estimated 20 drafts.

He had never directed a play or film before, but was determined to direct No. 2 – partly "out of a sense of responsibility to the Pacific community" – particularly the working class suburb of Mount Roskill, where most of the film was shot. He also directed the video for the film's hit song "Bathe In the River" sung by Hollie Smith at the Mount Roskill house of relatives.

When No. 2 debuted at the Sundance Film Festival in 2006, it won the Audience Award (World Cinema Dramatic). Re-titled Naming Number Two in some territories, the film won selection in the Panorama section of the Berlin Film Festival and won the Audience award at the Brisbane International Film Festival. The late Ruby Dee, who played family matriarch Nanna Maria, was awarded Best Actress at the 2006 Atlanta Film Festival. In the same year at the New Zealand Screen Awards No. 2 was nominated in 12 categories, including best film and best director, and won four awards, three of them for performance, including Best Actress for Ruby Dee.

In 2008, Fraser directed his multi award-winning second feature, Dean Spanley, produced by Matthew Metcalfe and starring Sam Neill, Jeremy Northam and Peter O'Toole. A whimsical tale of fathers, sons, dogs, and other lives set in Edwardian England, it received critical acclaim and premiered at a Gala Screening at the 2008 Toronto International Film Festival.

Dean Spanley was nominated for 12 awards at the 2009 Qantas Film and Television Awards. It went on to win seven, including best director, best film costing more than $1 million, best screenplay, and best supporting actor (Peter O'Toole).

Next, Fraser wrote and directed Giselle, also produced by Matthew Metcalfe, an acclaimed filmed ballet starring world-renowned dancers Gillian Murphy and Qi Huan. Fraser's interpretation of the Royal New Zealand Ballet's production of Giselle, featuring a score performed by the Auckland Philharmonia Orchestra, Giselle premiered at the 2013 New Zealand International Film Festival, followed by an international premiere at the Toronto Film Festival.

His fourth film, The Dead Lands, was released in 2014. Starring James Rolleston, Lawrence Makoare and Te Kohe Tuhaka, it is the story of a young boy who seeks revenge for the slaughter of his family. Entirely in the Maori language, the film is produced again by Matthew Metcalfe and marks Fraser's fourth collaboration with cinematographer Leon Narbey.

== Filmography ==
Year	Title	Director	Writer
2005	River Queen	No	Yes
2006	No. 2	Yes	Yes
2008	Dean Spanley	Yes	No
2013	Giselle	Yes	No
2014	The Dead Lands	Yes	No
2014	The Chancellor Manuscript	Yes	No
2017	6 Days	Yes	No

TV series

Year	Title	Director	Co-Executive Producer
2016	Penny Dreadful	Yes	No
2017	The Shannara Chronicles	Yes	No
2017-2018	Into the Badlands	Yes	No
2018	Marvel's Iron Fist	Yes	No
2018	Marvel's Daredevil	Yes	No
2018-2019	The Rookie	Yes	No
2018	Tidelands	Yes	No
2019	Swamp Thing	Yes	No
2019	Wu Assassins	Yes	No
2019	The Terror	Yes	No
2019	The Affair	Yes	No
2019	Titans	Yes	No
2020	Deputy	Yes	No
2020	Stargirl	Yes	No
2021-2024	Sweet Tooth	Yes	Yes
2025	Rescue: HI-Surf	Yes	No
2025	Murderbot	Yes	Yes
2026	Memory of a Killer	Yes	No

== Other venues ==
Stage play

- BARE (1998)
- No. 2 (1999)
- Paradise (2001)

Video clip

- "Bathe In the River"

Musical

- Feedback (2002) (with Tim Finn)

== Awards ==
- Best New Play and Best New Playwright, New Zealand Chapman Tripp Awards, 1998
- Sunday Star Times Bruce Mason Award, 1999
- Fringe First Award, Edinburgh Festival Fringe, 2000: for the play version of No. 2
- University of South Pacific's Writer in Residence Fellowship, 2001
- The World Cinema Audience Award: Dramatic, Sundance Film Festival, January 2006
- Inducted to Arts Honours Board, Sacred Heart College, Auckland, September 2006 (along with, amongst others, Tim Finn and Dave Dobbyn)
- Best Director, Feature Film, Qantas Film and Television Awards 2009 (Dean Spanley)
- Best Film, Qantas Film and Television Awards 2009 (Dean Spanley)
- Fulbright-Creative New Zealand Pacific Writer's Residency, Hawai'i 2009
- Young Alumnus of the Year, The University of Auckland 2009
- Buddle Findlay Sargeson Fellowship 2003
- TV Guide New Zealand Television Awards, Best Script, Drama 2002 (Staunch)
- Chapman Tripp Theatre Award – Outstanding New Zealand Play 2000 (No. 2)
