= Murder of Grace Millane =

2018 killing of a British tourist in New Zealand

- Millane at her university graduation
- Location: Auckland, New Zealand
- Date: 2 December 2018
- Attack type: Murder by strangulation
- Deaths: 1
- Victim: Grace Millane
- Perpetrator: Jesse Shane Kempson
- Verdict: Guilty
- Convictions: Murder
- Sentence: Life imprisonment, with a minimum non-parole period of 17 years

Grace Emmie Rose Millane (2 December 1996 – 2 December 2018) was a British tourist who was murdered in Auckland, New Zealand, on 2 December 2018. Millane's body was found in the Waitākere Ranges west of Auckland on 9 December 2018 after a 26-year-old man, Jesse Shane Kempson, was charged on 8 December 2018 with her murder. Kempson's name could not be published in New Zealand until late 2020 due to a New Zealand court order. Despite this, some international media outlets chose to publish his name.

Kempson was tried at the Auckland High Court in November 2019 where he claimed that Millane had died during consensual sex. After a three-week trial, he was convicted by a unanimous guilty verdict and later sentenced to life imprisonment, with a minimum non-parole period of 17 years. Kempson filed an appeal against his conviction, which was dismissed by New Zealand's Court of Appeal on 18 December 2020. The suppression order was lifted by the New Zealand Supreme Court on 22 December 2020. It was then also revealed that he had been convicted of rape and sexual abuse charges relating to two other women in October and November 2020.

== Background and disappearance ==
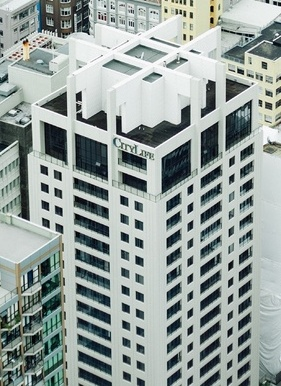
Millane was last seen at the CityLife Hotel on Queen Street.

Grace Millane was from Wickford, Essex. She had recently graduated from the University of Lincoln with a bachelor's degree in advertising and marketing, and was on a backpacking tour during her gap year.

Millane was on a two-week stay in New Zealand after spending six weeks in South America. She entered New Zealand on 20 November 2018 and travelled around the upper North Island. She arrived in Auckland on 30 November. At 9:00 pm on 1 December, she was seen on Victoria Street in Auckland's central business district, and 15 minutes later she was seen via CCTV at SkyCity. She was last seen at 9:41 pm at the CityLife Hotel on Queen Street with Jesse Kempson.

== Investigation ==
Millane's parents became concerned after she did not reply to birthday wishes they sent her on 2 December 2018. Police started investigating after she was reported missing by her parents three days later. The hostel she was staying at reported that she did not return to her room on the night of her disappearance. Police scanned Grace's social media profiles, and reached out to a recent commenter on her Facebook page, which was Jesse Kempson. Kempson was interviewed by Detective Sergeant Ewen Settle, as to his whereabouts on the Sunday after Grace's murder. His timelines were muddled, as he stated he wasn't awake until after 10:00, but CCTV footage from the hotel showed him up and walking about at 08:14 with a suitcase.

Police announced on 8 December that they were treating the case as a homicide investigation, and Kempson was subsequently charged with her murder.

Millane's body was found on 9 December at around 4 pm, off Scenic Drive in the Waitākere Ranges around 19 km (12 mi) west of central Auckland. A post-mortem examination was done on 10 December. Further investigations of the area where Millane was found were carried out on 11 December. Police asked for the public's help in finding a shovel they believed was related to the inquiry. A shovel fitting the police description was found on 13 December. Police also requested public help tracing the movements of a rental car Kempson leased between 2 and 3 December. The car had subsequently been re-leased and was located on 8 December in Taupō, 275 km (171 mi) south of Auckland.

=== Arrest ===
Kempson, 26 years old, was taken into custody on 8 December at 3 pm. He had been staying at the CityLife Hotel in central Auckland. Kempson appeared in the Auckland District Court on 10 December 2018, charged with murdering Millane.

Kempson was born and grew up in the Wellington Region. After his parents separated when he was nine, he was raised by his father and grandfather. His mother moved overseas while his father remarried and had a step family. At Aotea College, Kempson played softball at a regional representative level for multiple teams. He worked as a bartender and builder/labourer and also lived in Sydney, Australia between 2013 and 2016. Kempson was estranged from his family. Kempson's paternal grandfather alleged that he had fathered a child while living in Sydney but this is disputed by other relatives. His previous offending was limited to a conviction for drunk driving and a few arrests for alcohol-related disorderly behaviour.

==== Name suppression ====
During the initial appearance, Kempson was denied name suppression, but this was appealed by the defence, automatically triggering interim name suppression for a period of 20 working days. (Note: For court purposes, non-working days are Saturdays, Sundays, national public holidays (but not regional anniversary days), and all days between 25 December and 15 January.^{:5}) The suppression order could not be enforced against media outlets outside New Zealand, and several outlets, particularly in the United Kingdom, chose to publish Kempson's name. Google included Kempson's name in an email it sent to subscribers of its newsletter on trending topics in New Zealand, which claimed that 100,000 searches had been done of the name within the country. Justice Minister Andrew Little and the New Zealand Bar Association criticised the foreign media, saying the publication of Kempson's name endangered his right to a fair trial.

Kempson was remanded in custody and appeared in the Auckland High Court on 16 January 2019 where he pleaded not guilty. His identity remained suppressed pending an appeal. The appeal was heard at the High Court on 7 February; the judge reserved his decision, meaning the order remained in force until the decision was released. New Zealand police investigated a number of alleged breaches of the name-suppression order. In February 2020 an Auckland businessman, Leo Molloy, was prosecuted for such a breach. After initially entering a plea of not guilty, Molloy changed his plea to guilty in June 2020. In April 2021, he was sentenced to 350 hours of community service and a NZ$15,000 fine. In August 2021 Molloy unsuccessfully appealed his conviction and sentence.

Kempson was formally identified on 22 December 2020, after the Supreme Court of New Zealand rejected his appeal for continued name suppression. It was also disclosed that Kempson had been convicted of nine total charges of rape, sexual violation, threatening to kill, and assault in two sexual violence trials before a judge in October and November 2020 that were independent of the Millane case.

== Reactions ==
Millane's death generated an unprecedented reaction from the New Zealand public. Prime Minister Jacinda Ardern made a public apology to Millane's family on 10 December, saying "on behalf of New Zealand, I want to apologise. Your daughter should have been safe here, and she wasn't". During the press conference, she appeared to be close to tears. The University of Lincoln, where Millane studied, said that its community was "deeply saddened" by her death. Auckland's Sky Tower and Harbour Bridge were lit up in a white ribbon shape from 10 to 13 December to mark her death. Candlelight vigils were held on 11–12 December at several locations around New Zealand.

Journalists Alison Mau and Paul Little criticised the media coverage as an example of missing white woman syndrome, where significantly more media attention is given to "typically white, conventionally attractive" females from middle-class backgrounds who are depicted as "innocent" and "angelic". On 10 January 2019, hundreds turned out for Millane's funeral at Brentwood Cathedral in Essex.

In November 2019, Radio New Zealand broadcaster Colin Peacock criticised the conduct of some foreign media in both the Grace Millane and the concurrent Amber-Rose Rush murder trials, arguing that their breaches of New Zealand name suppression orders threatened the fair trial rights for defendants. Meanwhile, the Otago Daily Times editorialised that the Millane murder case highlighted that in New Zealand, women were statistically more likely to be victims of violent crimes than men. In late February 2020, The Guardian's Sian Norris described using "rough sex" as a murder defence as "grotesque victim blaming."

=== Love Grace charity ===
In the aftermath of Millane's death, her mother, Gillian Millane, and cousin, Hannah O'Callaghan, founded the charity Love Grace to help women affected by domestic violence. The charity collects handbags and fills them with toiletries for victims of abuse. As of December 2023, they had donated 15,600 handbags in the United Kingdom and internationally. The charity also raises money for the White Ribbon Campaign. In the British 2024 New Year Honours, both Gillian Millane and Hannah O'Callaghan were appointed Officers of the Order of the British Empire, for services to charitable fundraising and tackling violence against women.

== Trial and appeals ==
The trial began on 4 November 2019 with the selection of the jury. Kempson reaffirmed his earlier not guilty plea, with proceedings expected to last five weeks. The prosecution led by Crown solicitor Brian Dickey argued that Kempson had strangled Millane to death following a Tinder date. The Crown also testified that, after killing her, Kempson conducted several Internet searches on how to dispose of bodies as well as viewing pornography. Dickey also said Kempson calmly and callously disposed of Millane's body and other evidence, and then created a "labyrinth of storytelling and lies" to cover his tracks.

Three female witnesses, whom Kempson had also met through Tinder, testified that he liked masochistic and bondage sex including choking. The Crown also presented security camera footage of Kempson and Millane, including his renting a carpet cleaning machine at the Countdown supermarket in Quay Street. A Crown expert witness, pathologist Simon Stables, testified that a postmortem examination of Millane's body had found bruising consistent with someone who had been restrained and asphyxiated. Millane's post-mortem blood alcohol concentration was measured at 106 milligrams of alcohol per 100 millilitres of blood, over the legal driving limit of 50 mg per 100 mL.

The defence team led by Ian Brookie argued that Millane's death was the result of a consensual sexual "misadventure" between Kempson and Millane. They alleged that Millane had an interest in bondage and sado-masochism and had asked Kempson to choke her during a consensual sex game which went wrong. While acknowledging that Kempson had tried to hide and bury the victim's body, they contended that he had panicked. The defence's expert witness, pathologist Fintan Garavan, contested the Crown's autopsy evidence, claiming that her injuries were consistent with a consensual sex act due to the lack of defensive wounds on Millane's body. Garavan also alleged that the victim's alcohol consumption could have contributed to her death. Defence lawyer Ron Mansfield also argued that Kempson's claiming to be wealthy and successful stemmed from his personal insecurity.

The trial lasted three weeks. The jury, which consisted of seven women and five men, returned a guilty verdict on 22 November 2019 after deliberating for five hours. The verdict was welcomed by Millane's parents, David (who subsequently died of cancer in November 2020) and Gillian. Several members of the jury reportedly wept following the verdict. In New Zealand, murder carries a mandatory sentence of life imprisonment with a minimum non-parole period of 10 years except when such a sentence would be manifestly unjust (e.g. mercy killings). Judges have discretion to order a longer non-parole period.

On 21 February 2020, Kempson was sentenced to life in prison with a minimum non-parole period of 17 years. On 18 March, it was reported that Kempson would appeal his conviction and sentence at the Court of Appeal. The appeal hearing began in Auckland on 6 August.

On 18 December 2020, the Court of Appeal dismissed the appeal, although the Supreme Court ordered that name suppression should remain in place until a further court order. That same day, it was reported that taxpayers had paid more than NZ$400,000 in Kempson's legal aid.

On 29 June 2021, the Supreme Court dismissed Kempson's application for leave to appeal the verdict, thereby exhausting his legal avenues to overturn his conviction.

== In popular culture ==
The Grace Millane case was the subject of New Zealand journalist Steve Braunias' award-winning 2021 book Missing Persons. In December 2022, TVNZ released a two-part documentary series on the murder case called Swipe, Match, Murder: The Disappearance of Grace Millane.

On 25 April 2024, a 92-minute documentary on the murder case called The Lie was released in New Zealand cinemas. It was directed by British film-maker Helena Coan and called for consensual rough-sex defence to be banned, hence the title. The film was released on Netflix in September 2024, becoming the stream service's "number one" film in New Zealand.

== See also ==
- List of solved missing person cases (post-2000)
- Rough sex murder defense
