= Lucy Lawless =

New Zealand actress (born 1968)

Lucy Lawless MNZM
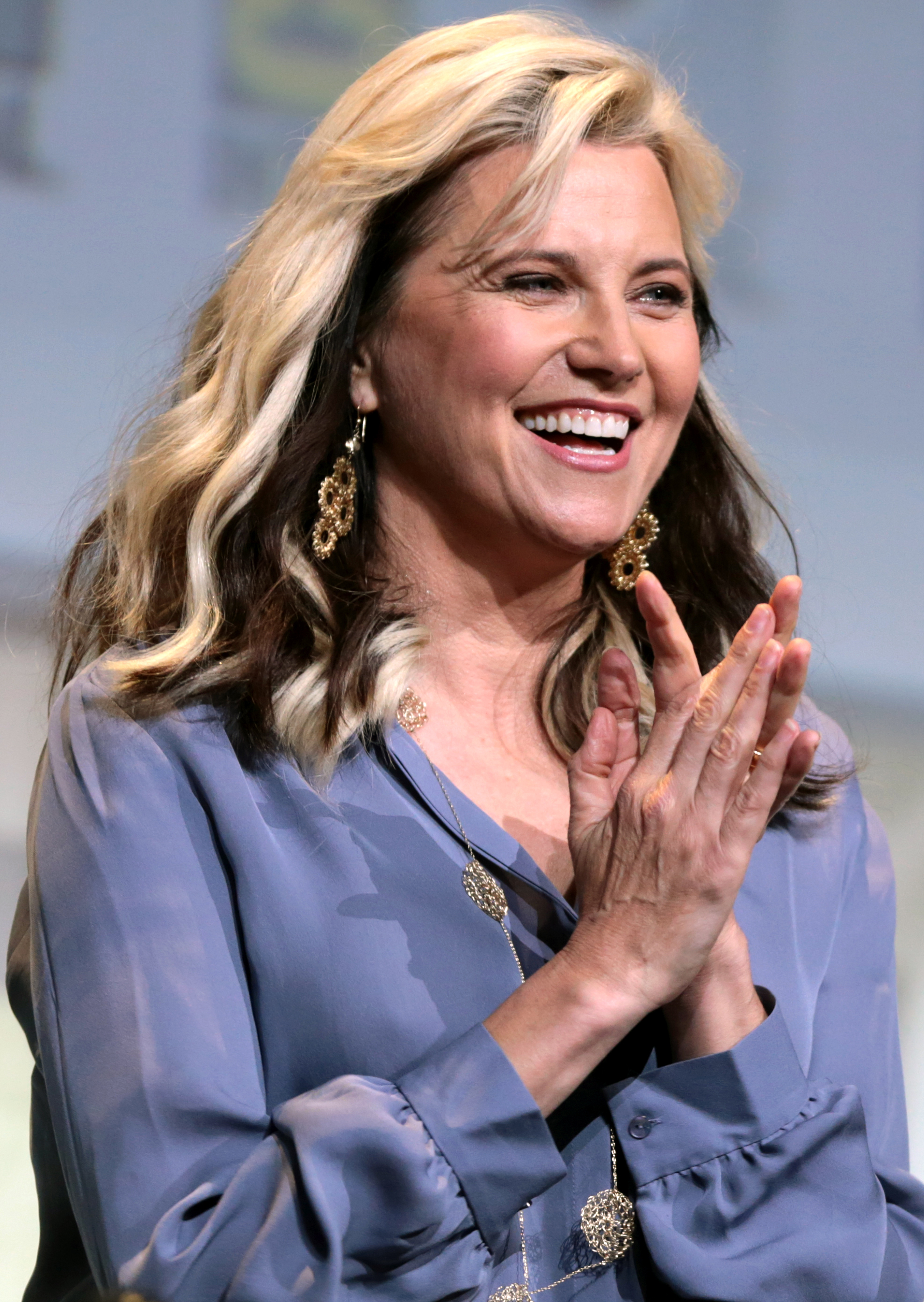
- Lawless at the 2016 San Diego Comic-Con
- Born: Lucille Frances Ryan; 29 March 1968 (age 58); Auckland, New Zealand
- Occupations: Actress; singer; director
- Years active: 1989–present
- Spouse(s): Garth Lawless (m. 1988; div. 1995) Rob Tapert (m. 1998)
- Children: 3

Lucille Frances Lawless MNZM (née Ryan; born 29 March 1968) is a New Zealand actress, singer, and director. She is best known for her roles as Xena in the television series Xena: Warrior Princess, as D'Anna Biers on the reimagined Battlestar Galactica series, and Lucretia in the television series Spartacus: Blood and Sand and associated series. Since 2019, she has starred as Alexa in the television series My Life Is Murder.

Lawless had recurring roles as Diane Lewis-Swanson on the NBC sitcom Parks and Recreation (2012–2014), and as Countess Palatine Ingrid von Marburg on the WGN America supernatural series Salem (2015). She also starred as Ruby on the Starz horror-comedy series Ash vs Evil Dead (2015–2018).

== Early life and education ==
Lawless was born in the Auckland suburb of Mount Albert to teacher Julie Ryan (née Haynes) and Mount Albert's mayor, banker Frank Ryan. She is the fifth of six siblings (four brothers and one sister). She has described her family as "this big, sprawling Irish Catholic family", and while filming in Ireland for the Discovery Channel in 2004, told Ireland on Sunday that her father's family originated in Quilty, County Clare, Ireland.

Her first musical was at age 10 and she began acting in secondary school. She attended Marist College, Auckland, and began studies at Auckland University in languages. At 18, she went on her "overseas experience", travelling through Europe and Australia with her future husband, Garth Lawless. At 21, she won the 1989 Mrs New Zealand competition.

Lawless has said she suffered from bulimia as a child, but was able to overcome the illness.

== Acting career ==
Lawless's television debut was in the New Zealand sketch-comedy series, Funny Business. Then she studied drama at the William Davis Centre for Actors Study in Vancouver, Canada.

In 1994, Lawless appeared in Hercules and the Amazon Women, that became the television pilot for Hercules: The Legendary Journeys. In that episode, she played a man-hating Amazon named Lysia. She went on to play another character, Lyla, in the first-season episode "As Darkness Falls".

=== Xena: Warrior Princess ===
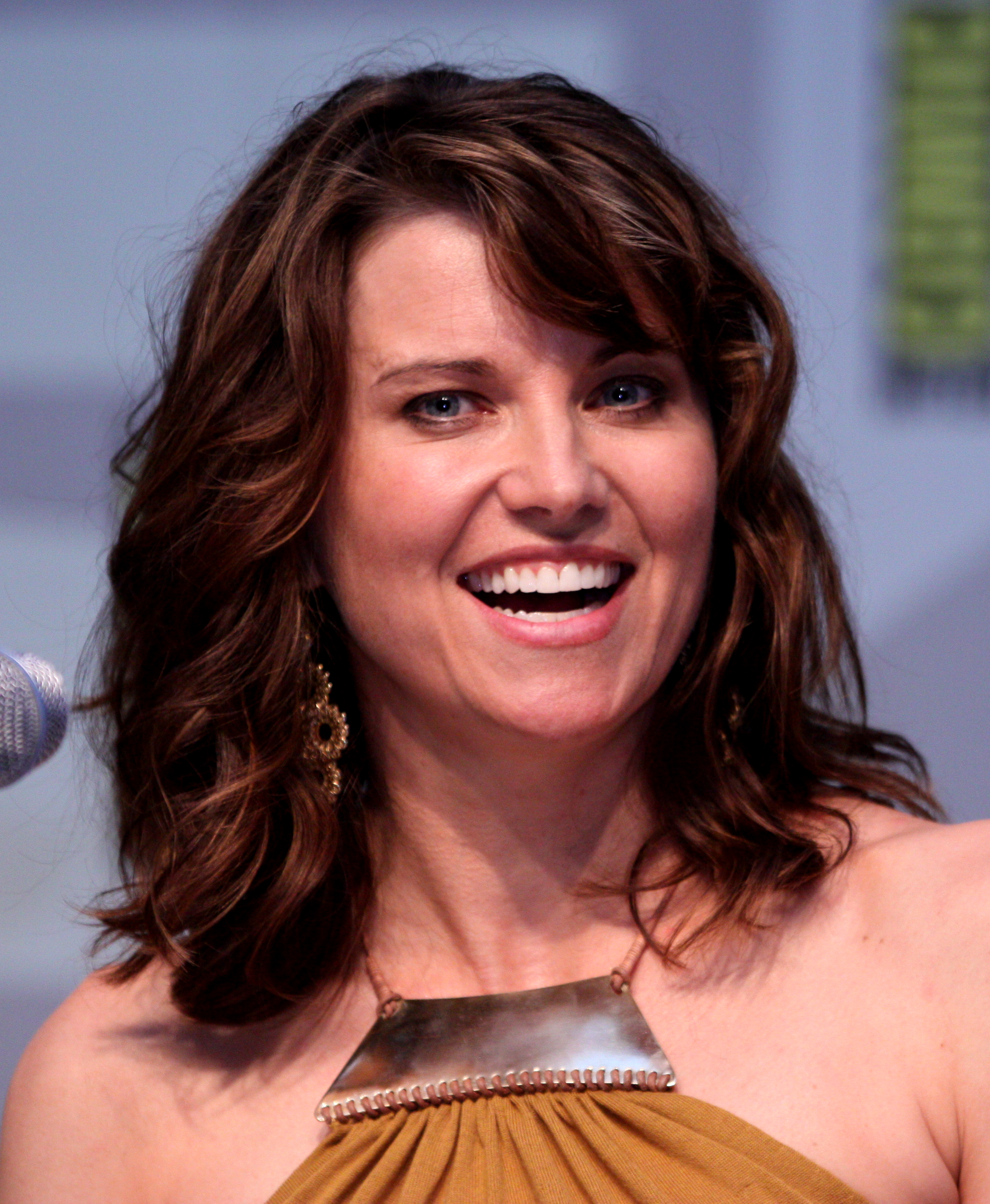
Lawless at San Diego Comic-Con in July 2010

Lawless received her best-known role as a heroic warrior woman named Xena in the first season of Hercules. She first appeared in the episode "The Warrior Princess" which aired in March 1995. R. J. Stewart dramatised the teleplay from a story that Robert G. "Rob" Tapert commissioned John Schulian to write. The character became a fan favourite. Vanessa Angel was originally cast in the role, but she fell ill and was unable to travel to New Zealand for shooting. To differentiate between Xena and the similar Lysia, Lawless's hair, previously an ash blonde, was dyed black. She also wore a much darker costume. Lawless returned as Xena in two more episodes of the first season of Hercules, which portrayed her turn from villainess to a good, heroic character.

The character was popular enough that a spin-off series was created: Xena: Warrior Princess debuted on 4 September 1995. Xena: Warrior Princess, like its parent programme, was a huge hit and achieved high ratings and cultural significance, lasting six seasons. The series brought Lawless an immense amount of attention and she became an international celebrity.

While taping an appearance on The Tonight Show with Jay Leno in October 1996, Lawless suffered a fractured pelvis when the horse she was riding lost its footing in the studio car park. She made a complete recovery, but several episodes of the second season of Xena were rewritten with body swaps to focus on background characters to minimise the time Lawless was needed on set. According to Lawless, the media attention about the accident increased viewership of the show.

=== Other acting work ===
Lawless first appeared on Broadway in September 1997 in the Grease revival, as the "bad girl" character Betty Rizzo. She wanted to play the lead role of Sandy and later stated her belief that the producers typecast her to play "bad girls" following her success as Xena. She said the Sandy character was very similar to her sheltered childhood, growing up in New Zealand with many protective older brothers.

From 2005 to 2009, she had a recurring role in the television series Battlestar Galactica. Lawless appeared as D'Anna Biers, a reporter with the Fleet News Service who worked on a critical documentary about the crew of the Galactica and was later revealed to be Humanoid Cylon model Number Three.

Lawless has also performed as a voice actor in several animated features: In 2008, Lawless voiced the animated character of Diana Prince/Wonder Woman in the direct-to-video superhero animated film Justice League: The New Frontier, adapted from the DC Comics limited series. In 2014, Lawless voiced the militaristic "Queen of the Ants" in the American animated television series Adventure Time on the Cartoon Network.

In 2007, Lawless was to appear as one of the leads in the ensemble cast of the ABC television series, Football Wives, based on the popular British series Footballers' Wives. The series did not continue past the pilot episode, but the network extended the options on its contracts with Lawless and the other actors slated to star in the series, including Gabrielle Union, Kiele Sanchez, Ving Rhames, and James Van Der Beek.

Lawless returned to television on 10 November 2008 in a guest-starring role on the CBS television series CSI: Miami, in a Season 7 episode, "Cheating Death", playing a madam with connections to a murder and helping Horatio "H" Caine with his inquiries.

In 2009, Lawless appeared in two episodes of the final season of The L Word as Sergeant Marybeth Duffy. She played a role in the Adam Sandler film Bedtime Stories released December 2008. Also in 2008, Lawless appeared with her former Xena stuntwoman Zoë Bell in Sony (Crackle)'s new web series Angel of Death, written by Ed Brubaker, which debuted online in early 2009. In 2009, Lawless guest-starred in the HBO series Flight of the Conchords as Paula, assistant to the Prime Minister of New Zealand.

Lawless co-starred in the Starz original series Spartacus: Blood and Sand. The show was based on the life of Spartacus, the famous gladiator, and the slave revolt he led, and was produced by long-time Xena producers Sam Raimi and "Rob" Tapert, her own husband. Lawless played the role of Lucretia, the wife of Lentulus Batiatus, who were both the owners of a gladiator ludus, which also saw Lawless doing nude scenes for the first time. Lawless won the 2011 Saturn Award as Best Supporting Actress for her role as Lucretia in Spartacus: Blood and Sand. Lawless reprised her role as Lucretia in Spartacus: Gods of the Arena, which chronicled life in the Ludus before Spartacus's arrival, and she also returned for the sequel Spartacus: Vengeance.

Lawless provided the voice of Goldmoon for Dragonlance: Dragons of Autumn Twilight, a direct-to-DVD animated film based on the novel of the same name. From 2012 to 2014, she had a recurring role on the NBC series Parks and Recreation as Diane, the love interest and eventual wife of Ron Swanson.

In 2014, Lawless guest-starred in Agents of S.H.I.E.L.D. as Isabelle Hartley in the season two premiere, and reprised the role later in episode 15 of season two, "One Door Closes". In 2015, Lawless landed the recurring guest role of Countess Palatine Ingrid Von Marburg in WGN America's Salem. Countess Marburg is presented as one of the last remaining survivors of the legendary line of ancient German witches. The series ended in 2017. In March 2015, it was announced that she would be portraying the role of Ruby in Starz horror-comedy series Ash vs Evil Dead. The series ended in 2018.

In 2019, Lawless began playing Alexa Crowe, a retired police officer turned police consultant investigator in My Life Is Murder.

== Filmmaking ==
In 2023, Lawless co-wrote and directed Never Look Away, a film based on the life of New Zealand-born CNN photojournalist and camerawoman Margaret Moth. The film had its world premiere in the World Cinema Documentary Competition section of the 40th Sundance Film Festival in Park City and Salt Lake City, Utah, in January 2024, and has gone on to feature at several other film festivals in 2024.

== Music ==
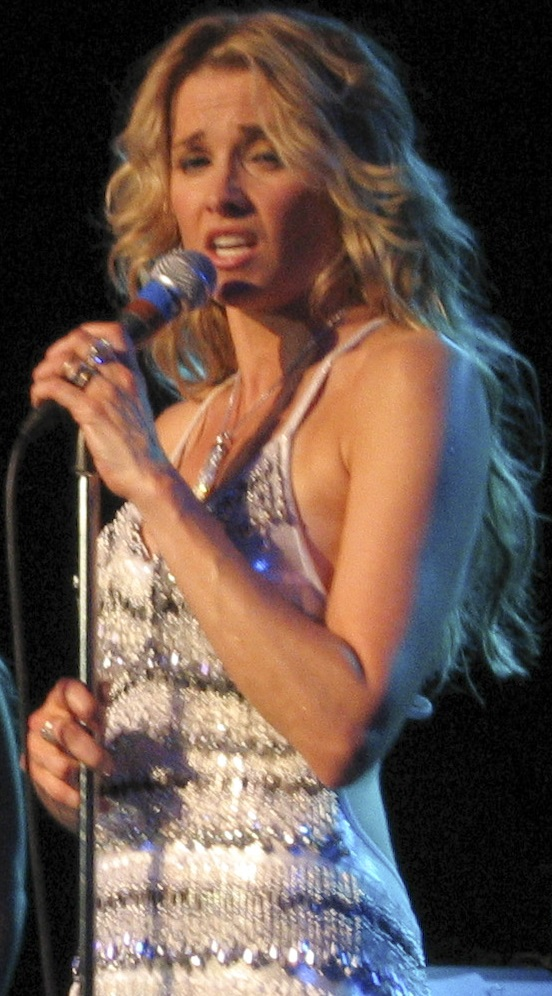
Lawless performing at the Roxy, 2007

Lawless, who has a background in musical theatre, played Betty Rizzo on Broadway in a production of Grease in 1997. She continued to sing during the run of Xena, even contributing dirge music of her own composition; this made it into the episode "The Path Not Taken" as the dirge "Burial", which she sang for the first time in the episode. Two musically-oriented episodes, "The Bitter Suite" and "Lyre, Lyre, Heart's on Fire", also showcased not only her singing but also that of some of her castmates. (See also List of Xena: Warrior Princess episodes for details.)

Lawless was encouraged to resume her singing career after being a contestant on Celebrity Duets, which she finished as runner-up to Alfonso Ribeiro. She made her solo debut at the Roxy in Hollywood, a venue of 500 seats, on 13 January 2007, with a sold-out crowd for consecutive concerts.

== LGBT rights icon ==
Xena's ambiguous romantic relationship with travelling companion Gabrielle (Renee O'Connor) led to Lawless becoming a lesbian icon, a role of which she has said she is proud. She has said that during the years she was playing the role, she had been undecided on the nature of the relationship, but in a 2003 interview with Lesbian News magazine, she said that after viewing the series finale, she had come to see Xena and Gabrielle's relationship as definitely gay, adding "they're married, man". She has appeared at gay pride events such as the Sydney Gay and Lesbian Mardi Gras.

For her support of LGBT rights, including her public support for same-sex marriage, Lawless was given the Star 100–Ally of the Year award at the Australian LGBTI Awards ceremony in 2017.

== Other activities ==
Lawless is a member of the board of trustees of the StarShip Foundation, the charity arm of the Starship Children's Health which is part of the Auckland District Health Board. It is set up to provide additional equipment, support and help to staff, patients and families. She helps fundraising for the organisation. In 2008, she sat for the New Zealand television series The Sitting, an arts series where celebrity portraits are produced during an interview session, with the portraits later auctioned for charity.

Since 2006, 21 September marks "Lucy Lawless Feel the Love Day/Week". The day, organised by the Official Lucy Lawless Fan Club, begins a week of charitable acts and donations by fans in honour and support of Lawless.

In May 2009 Lawless became a "climate ambassador" for the Greenpeace "Sign On" campaign.

In February 2012, she and six other Greenpeace activists boarded an oil drilling ship at Port Taranaki, and remained on it for 77 hours to stop it leaving for the Arctic where it was going to take part in oil exploration. She was subsequently arrested and charged with burglary, which carried an imprisonment term of up to 10 years if convicted. She pleaded guilty on 14 June 2012 to trespass charges regarding the February incident. Lawless said she intended for now to remain involved with Greenpeace. In February 2013, Lawless and the other six activists were each sentenced to pay a fine of NZ$651 and undertake 120 hours of community service. The judge denied the NZ$545,000 in reparations that Shell Todd Oil Services had sought from the activists. Following the sentencing, Lawless said: "I consider it a great victory that the court has struck down the reparation demand from Shell, which I think was absolutely ludicrous."

== Personal life ==
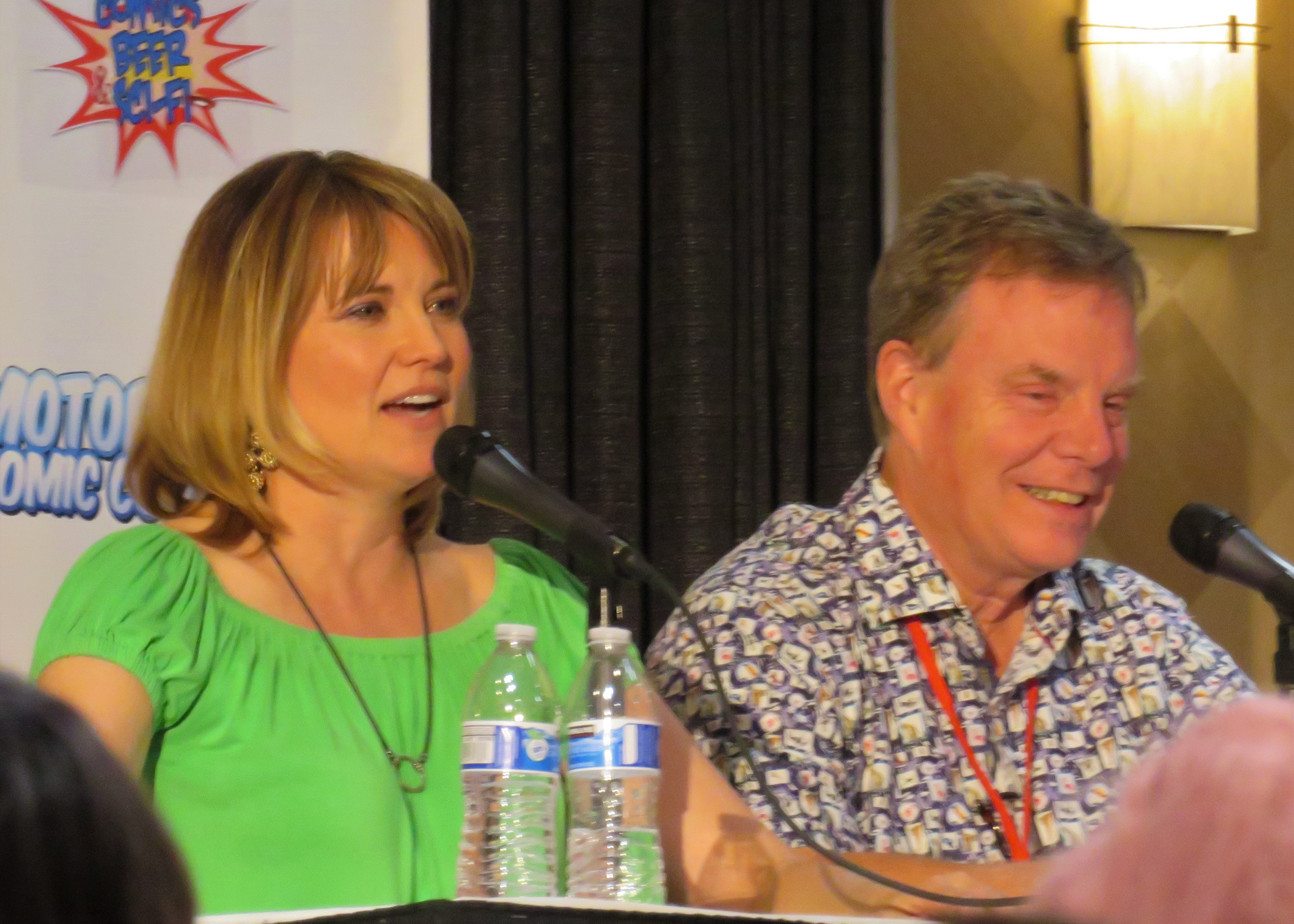
Lawless with her husband Rob Tapert in 2018

In 1988, she became pregnant by her boyfriend Garth Lawless while working with him in the Australian outback. They married in Kalgoorlie, Western Australia, that year, then returned to New Zealand where their daughter was born. They divorced in 1995.

On 28 March 1998, Lawless married Xena's executive producer, Pacific Renaissance Pictures CEO Rob Tapert, at St. Monica Catholic Church in Santa Monica, California. They have two sons.

== Recognition and awards ==
In the 2004 Queen's Birthday Honours, Lawless was appointed a Member of the New Zealand Order of Merit, for services to entertainment and the community.

Astronomer Michael E. Brown nicknamed his newly discovered dwarf planet "Xena" in 2003, its then-provisional designation being 2003 UB_{313}. When this object was initially determined to be larger than Pluto, it gained international attention and forced a year-long debate among astronomers as to the definition of a planet. Observations made by New Horizons subsequently found Pluto to be marginally larger than the object, which was ultimately named Eris. The object's nickname "Xena" was used in the press. New Scientist magazine polled the public on their preferred final name for the so-called tenth planet; "Xena" ranked number 4. Lawless called Brown in December 2005 to thank him for his "senseless act of beauty", and claimed that she "never dared hope [the name] would stick". Eventually, Xena and Pluto were deemed not to be true planets, and were instead classified as dwarf planets. In 2006, the dwarf planet nicknamed Xena was officially named Eris. However, Brown made an indirect tribute to Lawless by naming Eris's moon Dysnomia after the Greek goddess of lawlessness.

=== Awards and nominations ===
Year	Award	Category	Production	Result
1997	Saturn Award	Best Genre TV Actress	Xena: Warrior Princess	Nominated
2010	Golden Nymph	Outstanding Actress – Drama Series	Spartacus: Blood and Sand	Nominated
2010	Saturn Award	Best Supporting Actress on Television	Spartacus: Blood and Sand	Won
2016	Fangoria Chainsaw Awards	Best Supporting Actress on Television	Salem	Nominated

== Filmography ==
=== Film ===
Year	Title	Role	Notes
1990	Within the Law	Verity	
1990	A Bitter Song	Nurse 1	Short film
1991	The End of the Golden Weather	Joe's Girl	
1996	Peach	Peach	Short film
1997	Hercules & Xena: Wizards of the Screen	Xena	Short film
1998	Hercules and Xena – The Animated Movie: The Battle for Mount Olympus	Xena (voice)	
1999	I'll Make You Happy	Lucy Lawless	Cameo
2000	Ginger Snaps	Announcer on School's PA System	Uncredited
2002	Spider-Man	Punk Rock Girl	Cameo
2004	EuroTrip	Madame Vandersexxx	
2005	Boogeyman	Mary Jensen	
2006	The Darkroom	Cheryl	
2008	Dragonlance: Dragons of Autumn Twilight	Goldmoon (voice)	
2008	Justice League: The New Frontier	Wonder Woman (voice)	Direct-to-video
2008	Bedtime Stories	Aspen	
2009	Bitch Slap	Mother Superior	
2010	Lez Chat	Construction Worker	Short film
2017	The Changeover	Miryam Carlisle	
2018	The Breaker Upperers	Client	
2019	Mosley	Bera (voice)	
2021	The Spine of Night	Tzod (voice)	
2022	Minions: The Rise of Gru	Nun-chuck (voice)	
2024	Never Look Away	Director	Documentary
2025	Pike River	Helen Kelly	

Key
†	Denotes films that have not yet been released

=== Television ===
Year	Title	Role	Notes
1989	Funny Business	Various	Unknown episodes
1990	Shark in the Park	Kim Hughes	Episode: "Double or Quits"
1991	For the Love of Mike	Helen	Episode: "1.6"
1992	The Ray Bradbury Theater	Liddy Barton	Episode: "Fee Fie Foe Fum"
1992-1994	Marlin Bay		TV series
1993	The New Adventures of the Black Stallion	Sarah McFee	Episode: "Riding the Volcano"
1993	The Rainbow Warrior	Jane Redmond	Television film
1993	Typhon's People	Mink Tertius	Television film
1994	High Tide	Undercover policewoman	Episode: "Shanghied"
1994	Hercules and the Amazon Women	Lysia	Television film
1995	High Tide	Sharon List	Episode: "Dead in the Water"
1995	Hercules: The Legendary Journeys	Lyla	2 episodes
1995–1998	Hercules: The Legendary Journeys	Xena	Recurring role, 6 series, 134 episodes
1995–2001	Xena: Warrior Princess	Xena	Lead role
1997	Something So Right	Herself	Cameo, Season 1 EP 23
1998	Saturday Night Live	Herself/host/Various	Episode: "Lucy Lawless/Elliott Smith"
1999	The Simpsons	Xena (voice)	Episode: "Treehouse of Horror X"
2000	Celebrity Deathmatch	Xena (voice)	Episode: "The Return of Lucy Lawless"
2001	Just Shoot Me!	Stacy	Episode: "The Auction"
2001	The X-Files	Shannon McMahon	2 episodes
2003	Tarzan	Kathleen Clayton	Recurring role, 7 episodes
2003	Warrior Women with Lucy Lawless	Herself	5 episodes
2004–2009	bro'Town	Herself	3 episodes
2004	Less than Perfect	Tracy Fletcher	Episode: "Ignoring Lydia"
2005	Two and a Half Men	Pamela	Episode: "It Was 'Mame', Mom"
2005	Locusts	Maddy Rierdon	Television film
2005	Vampire Bats	Maddy Rierdon	Television film
2005–2009	Battlestar Galactica	D'Anna Biers	Recurring role, 16 episodes
2006	Veronica Mars	Agent Morris	Episode: "Donut Run"
2006	Celebrity Duets	Herself	Contestant, Runner-Up
2007	Burn Notice	Evelyn	Episode: "False Flag"
2007	Curb Your Enthusiasm	Herself	Episode: "The TiVo Guy"
2007	Football Wives	Tanya Austin	Unsold TV pilot
2008	CSI: Miami	Audrey Yates	Episode: "Cheating Death"
2009	The L Word	Sgt. Marybeth Duffy	2 episodes
2009	Flight of the Conchords	Paula	Episode: "New Zealand Town"
2009	Angel of Death	Vera	Episode: "Help"
2009; 2022	RuPaul's Drag Race	Herself	Guest Judge
2009; 2022	RuPaul's Drag Race Down Under	Herself	Guest Judge
2010	Spartacus: Blood and Sand	Lucretia	Main role, 13 episodes
2011	Spartacus: Gods of the Arena	Lucretia	Main role, 6 episodes
2011	American Dad!	Stacy (voice)	Episode: "A Piñata Named Desire"
2011	No Ordinary Family	Helen Burton	4 episodes
2012	Spartacus: Vengeance	Lucretia	Main role, 10 episodes
2012–2014	Parks and Recreation	Diane Lewis	Recurring role, 10 episodes
2013	Top of the Lake	Caroline Platt	2 episodes
2014–2015	Agents of S.H.I.E.L.D.	Isabelle Hartley	2 episodes
2014	The Code	Alex Wisham	Recurring role (season 1), 6 episodes
2014	Adventure Time	General Tarsal (voice)	Episode: "Dentist"
2015–2017	Salem	Countess Marburg	Recurring role, 15 episodes
2015–2018	Ash vs. Evil Dead	Ruby Knowby	Main role, 27 episodes
2016	Teenage Mutant Ninja Turtles	Hiidrala (voice)	Episode: "The Cosmic Ocean"
2017	The Changeover	Miryam Carlisle	Television film (Sci Fi New Zealand)
2019–present	My Life Is Murder	Alexa Crowe	Main role
2020	Star Wars Resistance	Aeosian Queen (voice)	2 episodes
2020	Big City Greens	Mimi O'Malley (voice)	Episode: "Cricket's Tickets"
2021	Mr. Corman	Cheryl	Episode: "Funeral"
2025	Spartacus: House of Ashur	Lucretia	Episode: "Dominus"
2026	Blue Murder Motel	Director	Two episodes

=== Video games ===
- Hunted: The Demon's Forge (2011), as Seraphine
- Evil Dead: The Game (2023), as Ruby Knowby

== Stage ==
- 1997: Grease! – On Broadway, NY USA
- 2002: The Vagina Monologues – Auckland, NZ
- 2005: Gentlemen Prefer Blondes – Seattle, USA
- 2011: BARE For Christchurch – Auckland, NZ
- 2013: Chicago The Musical – Hollywood Bowl, LA, USA
- 2013: Chicago The Musical – Auckland, NZ
- 2014–2015: Sleeping Beauty and Her Winter Knight – Pasadena, CA, USA
- 2017: Pleasuredome The Musical – Auckland, NZ

== Discography ==
Albums

- Come 2 Me
- Come to Mama: Lucy Lawless in Concert: The Roxy Theater in Hollywood

Concert DVDs

- Come to Mama: Lucy Lawless in Concert: The Roxy Theater in Hollywood
- Gimme Some, Sugar: Lawless, NYC
- Lucy Lawless Live in Chicago: Still Got The Blues
- Lucy Lawless Live at The Roxy Theater: Ho Down
- Lucy Lawless Live in Concert: Welcome to the Pleasuredome

Other songs

- "Little Child" on Unexpected Dreams – Songs From the Stars
- "4 All of Us" with Pauly Fuemana (OMC)
- "Little Child" on The Starship Christmas Album 2012 – Starship Foundation

Preceded by Susan Eisenberg (2001–2006)	Voice of Wonder Woman; 2008	Succeeded by Keri Russell (2009)
