= Beyond the Edge (2013 film) =

- Theatrical release poster
- Directed by: Leanne Pooley
- Written by: Leanne Pooley
- Produced by: Matthew Metcalfe
- Starring: Chad Moffitt; Sonam Sherpa; John Wraight; Joshua Rutter; Dan Musgrove
- Edited by: Tim Woodhouse
- Music by: David Long
- Production company: General Film Corporation
- Distributed by: Rialto Distribution (New Zealand)
- Release dates: 6 September 2013 (Toronto International Film Festival); 22 October 2013 (New Zealand)
- Running time: 93 minutes
- Country: New Zealand
- Language: English

Beyond the Edge is a 2013 New Zealand 3D docudrama about Tenzing Norgay and Sir Edmund Hillary's 1953 historical ascent of Mount Everest. It features dramatised recreations shot on Everest and in New Zealand, along with original footage and photographs from what was then the ninth British expedition to the mountain. It also includes audio from interviews with Hillary and recorded narration by expedition leader John Hunt.

The film premiered at the 2013 Toronto International Film Festival on 6 September, winning positive reviews from fans and film critics. The Toronto Star gave it 3.5 out of 4 stars. It was second runner-up for the People's Choice Award. It premiered in New Zealand on 22 October 2013.

== Cast ==
- Chad Moffitt: Sir Edmund Hillary
- Sonam Sherpa: Tenzing Norgay
- John Wraight: John Hunt, Baron Hunt
- Joshua Rutter: George Lowe
- Dan Musgrove: Tom Bourdillon
