= Margaret Moth =

New Zealand photojournalist (1951–2010)

Margaret Gipsy Moth
- Born: August 21, 1951; Gisborne, New Zealand
- Died: March 21, 2010 (aged 58); Rochester, Minnesota, U.S.
- Occupation: Photojournalist

Margaret Gipsy Moth (August 21, 1951– March 21, 2010) was a New Zealand-born photojournalist who worked for CNN in the US.

== Early life ==
Margaret Wilson was born on August 21, 1951 in Gisborne, New Zealand.

She studied at the University of Canterbury in Christchurch, majoring in photography and film.

== Career ==
Wilson was the first news camerawoman in New Zealand or Australia. In the 1970s, she worked for the local DNTV2 station in Dunedin, during which time she discovered a passion for skydiving. She then began working for the national TVNZ channel. In 1976, she was hired by TV One as camerawoman on a major documentary series about issues facing New Zealand women, called Women. It was made with an all-female crew, and produced by Deidre McCartin.

She changed her name "because there were too many Margarets and too many Wilsons", and wanted to be Margaret Tiger Moth, as her first parachute jump had been from a Tiger Moth aircraft, but officials refused permission, so she changed it to Margaret Gipsy Moth instead.

In 1980, Moth moved to the United States and worked for KHOU in Houston, Texas, for about seven years before moving to CNN in 1990.

Moth covered the 1990 Persian Gulf War, the rioting that followed Indira Gandhi's assassination, the civil war in Tbilisi, Georgia, the Bosnian War, and other conflict zones including Lebanon, Zaire, Somalia, and Chechnya.

On 23 July 1992, Moth was shot and severely wounded while filming in Sniper Alley in Sarajevo. Her jaw was shattered, considerable damage was done to her body, and her speech became slurred. Despite her injuries, she returned to work in Sarajevo in 1994, having accepted that working in a warzone brings risks. In 2002, working with CNN presenter Stefan Kotsonis, she covered a large Israeli raid on the West Bank. When IDF troops completely surrounded Yasser Arafat's compound, Moth filmed a group of doctors protesting a curfew who walked towards the soldiers.

== Recognition and awards ==
In 1992, Moth won a Courage in Journalism Award from the International Women's Media Foundation.

She was described by colleagues as quirky, tough, fearless, and funny.

== In film ==
Moth was the subject of the CNN short documentary Fearless: The Margaret Moth Story, which aired in October 2009. It covered many of her dangerous missions, including her shooting in Sarajevo in 1992.

Moth is the subject of a documentary feature-length film co-written and directed by New Zealand actress Lucy Lawless, titled Never Look Away, which had its world premiere in the World Cinema Documentary Competition section of the 40th Sundance Film Festival in Park City and Salt Lake City, Utah, in January 2024. The documentary won the Clio Visualizing History Prize at the 2024 Middlebury New Filmmakers Festival. The film was reviewed by The Guardian in November 2024.

== Personal life ==
Moth never married and did not have children.

She loved animals, and refused to do any filming that might harm one. At the time of her death, she had been looking after 25 stray cats in Istanbul.

== Later life and death ==
In 2007, Moth was diagnosed with colon cancer. Two years later, she told a CNN documentary crew, "I would have liked to think I'd have gone out with a bit more flair... the important thing is to know that you've lived your life to the fullest... You could be a billionaire, and you couldn't pay to do the things we've done."

After her diagnosis she moved back to the US from Istanbul. She entered a hospice in Rochester, Minnesota, where she died on March 21, 2010, at the age of 58.

A belated obituary appeared in The New York Times on April 11, 2026, as part of Overlooked, a series of obituaries about remarkable people whose deaths had gone unreported in the newspaper.
